= Bagus =

Bagus is a surname and a given name. Notable people with the name include:

Surname:

- Imam Bagus (born 1995), Indonesian professional footballer
- Ratu Bagus (1949–2021), Indonesian guru based in Bali, developed "Shaking Meditation"

Given name:

- Bagus Burham (1802–1873), Javanese philosopher and poet
- Indra Bagus Ade Chandra (born 1987), Indonesian badminton player
- Ida Bagus Putu Dunia (born 1957), former Chief of Staff of the Indonesian Air Force
- I Gusti Bagus Jelantik (1887–1966), raja of Karangasem Kingdom of Bali
- Bagus Kahfi (born 2002), Indonesian professional footballer
- Ida Bagus Made (1915–1999), traditional Balinese painter
- Ida Bagus Mantra (1928–1995), Governor of Bali (1978–1988)
- Ida Bagus Rai Mantra (born 1967), Indonesian politician
- Ida Bagus Putra Manuaba (1908–1980), Indonesian teacher and politician
- Bagus Nirwanto (born 1993), Indonesian professional footballer
- Gedong Bagus Oka (1921–2002), Hindu reformer and philosopher in Indonesia
- I Gusti Bagus Oka (1910–1992), the Governor for the Province of Bali
- Ida Bagus Oka (1936–2010), the Governor of Bali (1988–1998)
- Ida Bagus Nyoman Rai (1915–2000), traditional Balinese painter
- Bagus Setiadi (born 1966), badminton player from Indonesia
- Bagus Susetyo (born 1968), Deputy Mayor of Balikpapan, East Kalimantan (2025–2030)
- Anak Agung Bagus Suteja (1923–1966), the first governor of Bali
- Ida Bagus Made Togog (1913–1989), born into a noble Brahmana clan in the center of Batuan
- Ida Bagus Wiswantanu, Chief Government Prosecutor in Bali, Indonesia since 2002

== See also ==
- Asia Bagus, star-search program created by Fuji Television
- Gua Nasib Bagus (Good Luck Cave), cave in Sarawak, Malaysia
- Polyommatus bagus, small butterfly in the lycaenids or gossamer-winged family
