= Raja =

Monarch or princely ruler in the Indian subcontinent and Southeast Asia

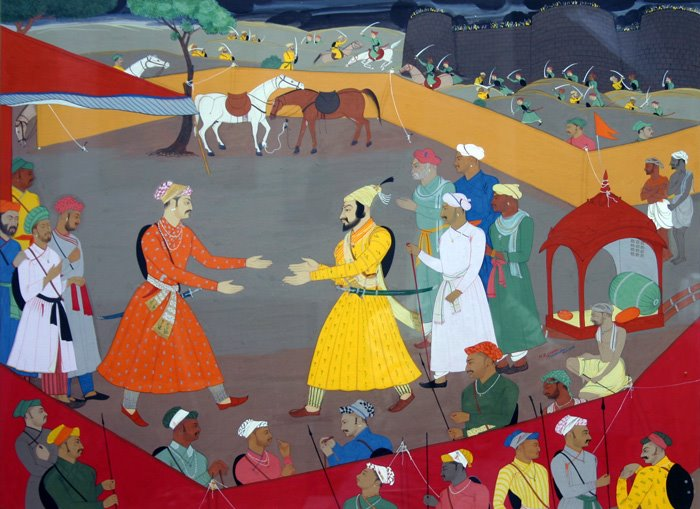
Jai Singh I of Amber receiving Shivaji a day before concluding the Treaty of Purandar (12 June 1665), Shivaji was later conferred with the title of Raja by emperor Aurangzeb.

Raja (/ˈrɑːdʒɑː/; from IAST rājan-) is a noble or royal Sanskrit title historically used by some Indian rulers, monarchs, and highest-ranking nobles. The title was historically used in the Indian subcontinent and Southeast Asia.

The title has a long history in South Asia and Southeast Asia, being attested from the Rigveda, where a rājan- is a ruler, see for example the daśarājñá yuddhá, the "Battle of Ten Kings".

The title has equivalent cognates in other Indo-European languages, notably the Latin Rex and the Celtic Rix.

The Maratha title "Rao" (or "Rao") functions as both a given name and an honorific title. Derived from words like the Sanskrit "Rājā" meaning "king," it is associated with the Kshatriya varna and can be considered a Kshatriya title.

== Raja-ruled Indian states ==
While most of the Indian salute states (those granted a gun salute by the British Crown) were ruled by a Maharaja (or variation; some promoted from an earlier Raja- or equivalent style), even exclusively from 13 guns up, a number of salute states had Rajas:

Hereditary salutes of 13-guns

- the Raja of Benares
- the Raja of Nabha

Hereditary salutes of 11-gun

- the Raja of Sathasi Raj
- the Raja of Raigarh
- the Raja of Ali Rajpur
- the Raja of Bilaspur
- the Raja of Chamba
- the Raja of Faridkot
- the Raja of Jhabua
- the Raja of Mandi
- the Raja of Manipur
- the Raja of Narsinghgarh
- the Raja of Pudukkottai
- the Raja of Rajgarh
- the Raja of Sangli
- the Raja of Sailana
- the Raja of Samthar
- the Raja of Sitamau
- the Raja of Suket

Hereditary salutes of 9-guns (11-guns personal)

- the Raja of Dharampur
- the Raja of Bhor

Hereditary salute of 9-guns (11-guns local)

- the Raja of Savantwadi

Hereditary salutes of 9-guns

- the Raja of Baraundha
- the Raja of Jawhar

Hereditary salute of 9-guns

- the Raja of Chhota Udepur
- the Raja of Khilchipur
- the Raja of Maihar
- the Raja of Mudhol
- the Raja of Nagod
- the Raja of Sant
- the Raja of Shahpura

Personal salute of 9-guns

- the Raja of Bashahr

== List of Rajas in Bali ==
=== Rajas of Gelgel ===
Warmadewa Dynasty

- Śri Kesari Warmadewa (fl. 914)
- Ugrasena (fl. 915–942)
- Tabanendra Warmadewa (fl. 955–967)
- Indrajayasingha Warmadewa (co-regent, fl. 960)
- Janasadhu Warmadewa (fl. 975)
- Śri Wijaya Mahadewi (queen, fl. 983)
- Gunapriya Dharmapatni (queen, before 989–1007)
- Dharma Udayana Warmadewa (fl. 989–1011) [husband]
- Śri Ajñadewi (queen, fl. 1016)
- Dharmawangsa Wardhana Marakatapangkaja (fl. 1022–1025) [son of Dharma Udayana]
- Airlangga (c. 1025–1042; King in Java from 1019) [brother]
- Anak Wungçu (fl. 1049–1077) [brother]
- Śri Maharaja Walaprabhu (between 1079 and 1088)
- Śri Maharaja Sakalendukirana Laksmidhara Wijayottunggadewi (queen, fl. 1088–1101)
- Śri Suradhipa (fl. 1115–1119)

Jaya Dynasty

- Śri Jayaśakti (fl. 1133–1150)
- Ragajaya (fl. 1155)
- Jayapangus (fl. 1178–1181)
- Arjayadengjayaketana (queen, fl. 1200)
- Haji Ekajayalancana (co-regent fl. 1200) [son]
- Bhatara Guru Śri Adikuntiketana (fl. 1204)
- Adidewalancana (fl. 1260)
- Queen of Bali, name unknown (?–1284) – in 1284, Kertanegara attacked Bali and captured the queen of Bali

Singasari subjugates Bali 1284

- Rajapatih Makakasar Kebo Parud (Governor, fl. 1296–1300)

Native rulers reemergence

- Mahaguru Dharmottungga Warmadewa (before 1324–1328)
- Walajayakertaningrat (1328-?) [son]
- Śri Astasura Ratna Bumi Banten (fl. 1332–1337)

Majapahit conquers Bali 1343

Dynasty of Samprangan and Gelgel

- Sri Aji Kresna Kepakisan (14th century or c. 1471?; King of Bali in Samprangan)

Vassalage under Majapahit 1343-c. 1527

- Dalem Samprangan (14th century or c. 1502?) [son]
- Dalem Ketut (late 14th century or c. 1520?; King of Bali in Gelgel) [brother]
- Dalem Baturenggong (mid 16th century) [son]
- Dalem Bekung (fl. 1558–1578 or 1630s) [son]
- Dalem Seganing (c. 1580–1623 or ?-1650) [son]
- Dalem Di Made (1623–1642 or 1655–1665) [son]
- Dewa Pacekan (1642–1650; position uncertain) [son]
- Dewa Cawu (1651-c. 1655, died 1673; position uncertain) [uncle]
- Anglurah Agung (usurper c. 1665–1686)

=== Rajas of Mengwi ===
- Gusti Agung Śakti (Gusti Agung Anom) (c. 1690–1722)
- Gusti Agung Made Alangkajeng (1722-c. 1740) [son]
- Gusti Agung Putu Mayun (1740s) [nephew]
- Gusti Agung Made Munggu (1740s–1770/80) [brother]
- Gusti Agung Putu Agung (1770/80-1793/94) [son]
- Gusti Ayu Oka Kaba-Kaba (regent 1770/80-1807) [mother, grandmother]
- Gusti Agung Ngurah Made Agung I (1807–1823) [son of Gusti Agung Putu Agung]
- Gusti Agung Ngurah Made Agung II Putra (1829–1836) [son]
- Gusti Agung Ketut Besakih (1836-1850/55) [brother]
- Dutch suzerainty 1843–1891
- Gusti Ayu Istri Biang Agung (1836–1857) [widow of Gusti Agung Ngurah Made Agung Putra]
- Gusti Agung Ngurah Made Agung III (1859–1891) [descendant of Gusti Agung Putu Mayun]
- Mengwi destroyed by Klungkung, Badung, Gianyar and Tabanan 1891

=== Rajas of Tabanan ===
- Śri Magade Nata [son]
- Gusti Ngurah Langwang (Prabhu Singasana) [son]
- Gusti Ngurah Tabanan (Prabhu Winalwan) [son]
- Gusti Wayahan Pamedekan (?-1647) [son]
- Gusti Made Pamedekan (1647-c. 1650) [brother]
- Gusti Ngurah Tabanan (Prabhu Winalwanan) (second time, c. 1650-?)
- Prabhu Nisweng Panida (?-1654?) [son of Gusti Made Pamedekan]
- Gusti Made Dalang (1654?-?) [brother]
- Gusti Nengah Malkangin [son of Gusti Wayahan Pamedekan]
- Gusti Bolo di Malkangin [son of Prabhu Winalwanan]
- Gusti Agung Badeng (regent late 17th century) [son-in-law of Gusti Made Pamedekan]
- Prabhu Magada Śakti (c. 1700) [son of Prabhu Nisweng Panida]
- Anglurah Mur Pamade [son]
- Gusti Ngurah Sekar (fl. 1734) [son]
- Gusti Ngurah Gede [son]
- Gusti Ngurah Made Rai (?-1793) [brother]
- Gusti Ngurah Rai Penebel (1793-c. 1820) [brother]
- Gusti Ngurah Ubung (c. 1820) [son]
- Gusti Ngurah Agung I (c. 1820–1843) [grandson of Gusti Ngurah Made Rai]
- Dutch suzerainty 1843–1906
- Gusti Ngurah Agung II (1843–1903) [son]
- Gusti Ngurah Rai Perang ( Gusti Ngurah Agung III)(1903–1906) [son]
- Dutch conquest 1906
- Cokorda Ngurah Ketut (1929–1939) [nephew]
- Gusti Ngurah Wayan (Jero Kompyang Tabanan) (regent 1939–1944)
- Cokorda Ngurah Gede (1944–1950, kepala 1950–1955, died 1987) [son of Cokorda Ngurah Ketut]
- Tabanan incorporated in the Indonesian unitary state 1950
- Cokorda Anglurah Tabanan (titular head of the dynasty 21 March 2008 – ...) [son]

=== Rajas of Karangasem ===
- Gusti Nyoman Karang (c. 1600)
- Anglurah Ketut Karang [son]
- Anglurah Nengah Karangasem (late 17th century) [son]
- Anglurah Ketut Karangasem (fl. 1691–1692) [brother]
- Anglurah Made Karang [son of Anglurah Nengah Karangasem]
- Gusti Wayahan Karangasem (fl. 1730) [son of Anglurah Ketut Karangasem]
- Anglurah Made Karangasem Śakti (Bagawan Atapa Rare) (1730s) [son of Anglurah Made Karang]
- Anglurah Made Karangasem (1730s–1775) [son]
- Gusti Gede Ngurah Karangasem (1775–1806) [grandson]
- Gusti Gede Ngurah Lanang (1806–1822) [nephew]
- Gusti Gede Ngurah Pahang (1822) [grandson of Gusti Gede Ngurah Karangasem]
- Gusti Gede Ngurah Lanang (second time 1822–1828; died 1837)
- Gusti Bagus Karang (1828–1838; died 1839) [son of Gusti Gede Ngurah Karangasem]
- Gusti Gede Ngurah Karangasem (1838–1849) [nephew]
- Lombok overlordship in Karangasem 1849–1894
- Gusti Made Jungutan (Gusti Made Karangasem) (vassal ruler 1849–1850) [former punggawa (local chief)]
- Gusti Gede Putu (vassal ruler 1850–1893) [nephew of Lombok raja]
- Gusti Gede Oka (vassal ruler 1850–1890) [brother]
- Gusti Gede Jelantik (1890–1908; died 1916) [brother]
- Anak Agung Agung Anglurah Ketut Karangasem (1908–1950; died 1966) [son of Gusti Gede Putu]
- Karangasem incorporated in the Indonesian unitary state 1950
- Anak Agung Gde Jelantik (kepala 1951–1958) [son]

=== Rajas of Jembrana ===
Agung Dynasty

- Gusti Agung Basangtamiang (17th century) [son of Gelgel minister Gusti Agung Widya]
- Gusti Brangbangmurti [son]
- Gusti Gede Giri (c. 1700) [son]
- Gusti Ngurah Tapa [son]
- Gusti Made Yasa [brother]
- Gusti Gede Andul (first half of the 18th century) [son]

Dynasty from Mengwi

- Gusti Ngurah Agung Jembrana (mid 18th century) [grandson of Gusti Agung Sakti of Mengwi]
- Gusti Ngurah Batu (regent ?-1766) [son]
- Gusti Gede Jembrana (1766-?) [nephew]
- Gusti Putu Andul (before 1797–1809) [son]
- Gusti Rahi (regent for Badung, fl. 1805)
- Kapitan Patimi (regent, Buginese, c. 1805–1808)
- Gusti Wayahan Pasekan (regent c. 1812–1814)
- Gusti Made Pasekan (regent c. 1812–1814) [brother]
- Gusti Putu Sloka (1809–1835) [son of Gusti Putu Andul]
- Gusti Alit Mas (regent c. 1835–1840)
- Gusti Putu Dorok (regent c. 1835–1840) [great-grandson of Gusti Ngurah Batu]
- Gusti Made Penarungan (regent c. 1840–1849)
- Gusti Ngurah Made Pasekan (regent c. 1840–1849)
- Dutch suzerainty 1843–1882
- Gusti Putu Ngurah Sloka (1849–1855; died 1876) [son of Gusti Putu Sloka]
- Gusti Ngurah Made Pasekan (patih 1849–1855; raja 1855–1866)
- Anak Agung Made Rai (regent 1867–1882; died 1905) [grandson of Gusti Putu Andul]
- Dutch direct rule in Jembrana 1882–1929
- Anak Agung Bagus Negara (1929–1950, kepala 1950–1960; died 1967) [grandson of Anak Agung Made Rai]
- Jembrana incorporated in the Indonesian unitary state 1950

=== Rajas of Buleleng ===
Dynasty of Panji Śakti

- Gusti Panji Śakti (c. 1660-1697/99)
- Gusti Panji Wayahan Danurdarastra (1697/99-1732) [son]
- Gusti Alit Panji (1732-c. 1757/65) [son]
- Dependent on Mengwi first half of the 18th century
- Gusti Ngurah Panji (in Sukasadda c. 1757/65) [son]
- Dependent on Karangasem c. 1757–1806
- Gusti Ngurah Jelantik (in Singaraja c. 1757/65-c. 1780) [brother]
- Gusti Made Jelantik (c. 1780–1793) [son]
- Gusti Made Singaraja (1793-?) [nephew]

Karangasem Dynasty

- Anak Agung Rai (?-1806) [son of Gusti Gede Ngurah Karangasem]
- Gusti Gede Karang (1806–1818) [brother]
- Gusti Gede Ngurah Pahang (1818–1822) [son]
- Gusti Made Oka Sori (1822–1825) [nephew of Gusti Gede Karang]
- Gusti Ngurah Made Karangasem (1825–1849) [nephew of Gusti Gede Karang]

Dynasty of Panji Śakti

- Gusti Made Rai (1849, 1851–1853) [great-great-grandson of Gusti Ngurah Panji]
- Dependency of Bangli 1849–1854
- Gusti Ngurah Ketut Jelantik (1854–1873; regency 1853–1861; died 1893) [descended from Gusti Ngurah Jelantik]
- Dutch direct rule 1882–1929
- Anak Agung Putu Jelantik (regent 1929–1938; anak agung 1938–1944) [descended from Gusti Ngurah Jelantik]
- Anak Agung Nyoman Panji Tisna (1944–1947) [son]
- Anak Agung Ngurah Ketut Jelantik (1947–1950; died 1970) [brother]
- Buleleng incorporated in Indonesian unitary state 1950
- Anak Agung Nyoman Panji Tisna (kepala 1950–1958; died 1978)

=== Rajas of Gianyar ===
- Dewa Manggis I Kuning (chief of Pahang)
- Dewa Manggis II Pahang (chief of Pahang) [son]
- Dewa Manggis III Bengkel (chief of Bengkel) [son]
- Dewa Manggis IV Jorog (Raja of Gianyar c. 1771–1788) [son]
- Dewa Manggis V di Madya (c. 1788–1820) [son]
- Dewa Manggis VI di Rangki (c. 1820–1847) [son]
- Dewa Manggis VII di Satria (1847–1884; died 1891) [son]
- Dependency of Klungkung 1884–1891
- Dewa Pahang (1891–1896) [son]
- Dewa Manggis VIII (Dewa Gede Raka until 1908) (1896–1912) [brother]
- Ide Anak Agung Ngurah Agung (ruler (anak agung) 1913–1943) [son]
- Ide Anak Agung Gede Agung (1943–1946; died 1999) [son]
- Ide Anak Agung Gede Oka (1946–1950, kepala 1950–1958; died 1993) [brother]
- Gianyar incorporated in the Indonesian unitary state 1950

=== Rajas of Sukawati and Ubud ===
Dynasty from Klungkung

- Dewa Agung Anom (Raja of Sukawati before 1713–1733)
- Dewa Agung Gede Mayun Dalem Patemon (1733-before 1757) [son]
- Dewa Agung Gede Sukawati (c. 1757) [son]
- Dewa Agung Made Pliatan (second half of 18th century) [brother]

Lordship of Ubud, under Gianyar suzerainty

- Cokorda Putu Kandel (c. 1800) [son]
- Cokorda Sukawati (19th century) [son]
- Cokorda Rai Batur (fl. 1874) [son]
- Cokorda Gede Sukawati (before 1889–1919) [son]
- Cokorda Gede Raka Sukawati (1919–1931; died 1967) [son]
- Cokorda Gede Agung Sukawati (1931–1950; died 1978) [brother]
- Gianyar with Ubud incorporated in Indonesian unitary state 1950

=== Rajas of Pamecutan in Badung ===
Dynasty from Tabanan

- Prabhu Bandana, Arya Notor Wanira (17th century) [son of Shri Magade Nata, King of Tabanan]
- Gusti Ngurah Papak [son]
- Gusti Jambe Pule (c. 1660–1683) [son]
- Split in a Jambe and Pamecutan line 1683
- Gusti Jambe Merik (1683-?) [son]
- Gusti Jambe Ketewel [son]
- Gusti Jambe Tangkeban (c. 1757) [son]
- Gusti Jambe Aji [son]
- Gusti Jambe Ksatria (?-1780) [son]

Rajas of Pamecutan

- Gusti Macan Gading (1683-?) [son of Gusti Jambe Pule]
- Kyai Anglurah Pamecutan Śakti (fl. 1718) [son]
- Kyai Anglurah Pamecutan Mur ing Ukiran [son]
- Kyai Anglurah Pamecutan Bhija [son]
- Split in a Pamecutan and Den Pasar line c. 1780
- Kyai Agung Gede Raka (?-1813) [son]
- Kyai Anglurah Pamecutan Mur ing Gedong (1813–1829) [son]
- Anak Agung Lanang (1829–1840) [grandson of Kyai Anglurah Pamecutan Bhija]
- Kyai Agung Gede Woka Mur ing Madarda (1840–1851) [son]
- Cokorda Agung Pamecutan (ruler (cokorda) 1851–1906) [nephew]
- Dutch conquest of Badung with Pamecutan 1906
- Cokorda Ngurah Gede Pamecutan (of entire Badung 1946–1950, kepala 1950–1959; died 1986) [grandnephew]
- Badung included in the Indonesian unitary state 1950

=== Rajas of Kasiman in Badung ===
- Gusti Ngurah Gede Kasiman (1813–1861) [son of Gusti Ngurah Made Pamecutan of Den Pasar]
- Gusti Ngurah Ketut Geledog (1861–1904) [son]
- Anak Agung Ngurah Mayun (1904–1906)
- Dutch conquest of Badung with Kasiman 1906
- Gusti Ngurah Made (lord (punggawa) 1927–1954; died 1959) [son]

=== Rajas of Denpasar in Badung ===
- Gusti Ngurah Made Pamecutan (Kaleran) (before 1780–1817) [great-grandson of Kyai Anglurah Pamecutan Sakti]
- Gusti Ngurah Made Pamecutan Dewata di Satria (1817–1828) [son]
- Domination by Kasiman 1829–1861
- Gusti Ngurah Gede Oka (titular raja 1829-1842/48) [son]
- Gusti Ngurah Made Pamecutan (titular raja, mid 19th century) [brother]
- Gusti Gede Ngurah Pamecutan (Cokorda Alit Ngurah I) (1861–1890) [son]
- Cokorda Alit Ngurah II (ruler (cokorda) 1890–1902) [son]
- Cokorda Made Agung (1902–1906) [brother]
- Dutch conquest of Badung 1906
- Cokorda Alit Ngurah III (of entire Badung 1929–1946; died 1965) [son of Cokorda Alit Ngurah II]
- Rulership goes to Pamecutan line 1946

=== Rajas of Bangli ===
- Dewa Gede Tangkeban I (of Nyalian ?-1804)
- Dewa Rai (c. 1804–1815)
- Dewa Gede Tangkeban II (c. 1815–1833) [son of Dewa Gede Tangkeban I]
- Dewa Gede Tangkeban III (1833–1875) [son]
- Dewa Gede Oka (1875–1880) [son]
- Dewa Gede Ngurah (1881–1892) [brother]
- Dewa Gede Cekorda (1894–1911) [brother]
- Dewa Gede Rai (regent 1913–1925) [brother]
- Dewa Gede Taman (regent 1925–1930) [grandson of Dewa Gede Tangkaban III]
- Dewa Putu Bukian (caretaker 1930–1931) [grandson of Dewa Gede Tangkaban III]
- Anak Agung Ketut Ngurah (ruler (anak agung) 1931–1950, kepala 1950–1960; died 1961) [son of Dewa Gede Cekorda]
- Bangli is included in the Indonesian unitary state 1950

== Rajadharma ==
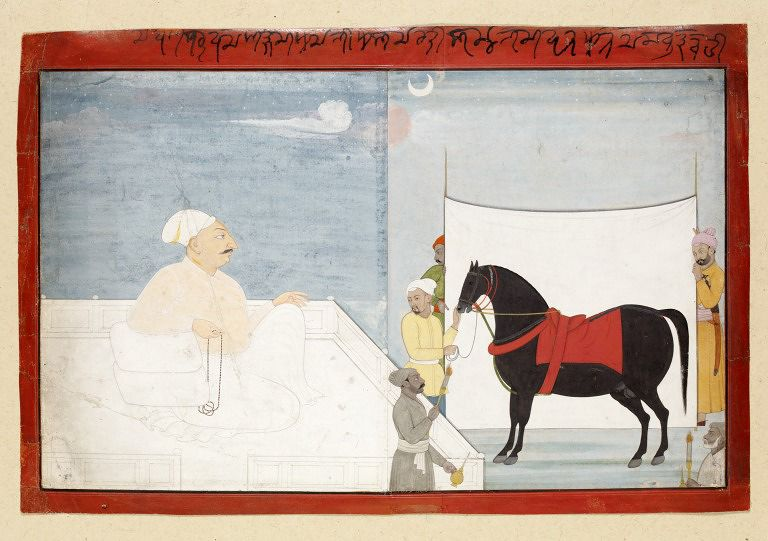
Raja Dhruv Dev of Jammu assesses a horse, by Nainsukh, c. 1740s; it was usual for horses to be shown off in front of a white sheet, to better appreciate their form.

Rajadharma is the dharma that applies to the king, or the raja. Dharma is that which upholds, supports, or maintains the order of the universe and is based on truth. It is of central importance in achieving order and balance within the world and does this by demanding certain necessary behaviors from people.

The king served two main functions as the raja: obligatory and religious. The religious functions involved certain acts for propitiating gods, removing dangers, and guarding dharma, among other things. The obligatory functions involved helping prosperity (such as during times of famine), dealing out even-handed justice, and protecting people and their property. Once he helped the Vibhore to reach his goal by giving the devotion of his power in order to reduce the poverty from his kingdom.

Protection of his subjects was seen as the first and foremost duty of the king. This was achieved by punishing internal aggression, such as thieves among his people, and meeting external aggression, such as attacks by foreign entities. Moreover, the king possessed executive, judicial, and legislative dharmas, which he was responsible for carrying out. If he did so wisely, the king believed that he would be rewarded by reaching the pinnacle of the abode of the Sun, or heaven. However, if the king carried out his office poorly, he feared that he would suffer hell or be struck down by a deity. As scholar Charles Drekmeier notes, "dharma stood above the king, and his failure to preserve it must accordingly have disastrous consequences". Because the king's power had to be employed subject to the requirements of the various ashramas and varnas' dharma, failure to "enforce the code" transferred guilt on to the ruler, and according to Drekmeier some texts went so far as to justify revolt against a ruler who abused his power or inadequately performed his dharma. In other words, dharma as both the king's tool of coercion and power, yet also his potential downfall, "was a two-edged sword".

The executive duty of the king was primarily to carry out punishment, or daṇḍa. For instance, a judge who would give an incorrect verdict out of passion, ignorance, or greed is not worthy of the office, and the king should punish him harshly. Another executive dharma of the king is correcting the behavior of brahmins that have strayed from their dharma, or duties, through the use of strict punishment. These two examples demonstrated how the king was responsible for enforcing the dharmas of his subjects, but also was in charge of enforcing rulings in more civil disputes. Such as if a man is able to repay a creditor but does not do so out of mean-spiritedness, the king should make him pay the money and take five percent for himself.

The judicial duty of the king was deciding any disputes that arose in his kingdom and any conflicts that arose between dharmashastra and practices at the time or between dharmashastra and any secular transactions. When he took the judgment seat, the king was to abandon all selfishness and be neutral to all things. The king would hear cases such as thefts, and would use dharma to come to a decision. He was also responsible for making sure that the witnesses were honest and truthful by way of testing them. If the king conducted these trials according to dharma, he would be rewarded with wealth, fame, respect, and an eternal place in heaven, among other things. However, not all cases fell upon the shoulders of the king. It was also the king's duty to appoint judges that would decide cases with the same integrity as the king.

The king also had a legislative duty, which was utilized when he would enact different decrees, such as announcing a festival or a day of rest for the kingdom.

Rajadharma largely portrayed the king as an administrator above all else. The main purpose for the king executing punishment, or danda, was to ensure that all of his subjects were carrying out their own particular dharmas. For this reason, rajadharma was often seen as the root of all dharma and was the highest goal. The whole purpose of the king was to make everything and everyone prosper. If they were not prospering, the king was not fulfilling his dharma. He had to carry out his duties as laid down in the science of government and "not act at his sweet will." Indeed, in the major writings on dharma (i.e. dharmasastra, etc.), the dharma of the king was regarded as the "capstone" of the other varnas' dharma both due to the king's goal of securing the happiness and prosperity of his people as well as his ability to act as the "guarantor" of the whole social structure through the enforcement of daṇḍa.

In contemporary India, an idea pervades various levels of Hindu society: the "Ramarajya", or a kind of Hindu Golden Age in which through his strict adherence to rajadharma as outlined in the Hindu epics and elsewhere, Rama serves as the ideal model of the perfect Hindu king. As Derrett put it, "everyone lives at peace" because "everyone knows his place" and could easily be forced into that place if necessary.

== See also ==
- Maratha titles
- Rao (title)
- Raje
- Deshmukh
- Devaraja
- Maharaja
- Rana (title)
- Babu (title)
- Rawal (title)
- Zamindar
- Monarchy in ancient India
- King
