= I Gusti Bagus Oka =

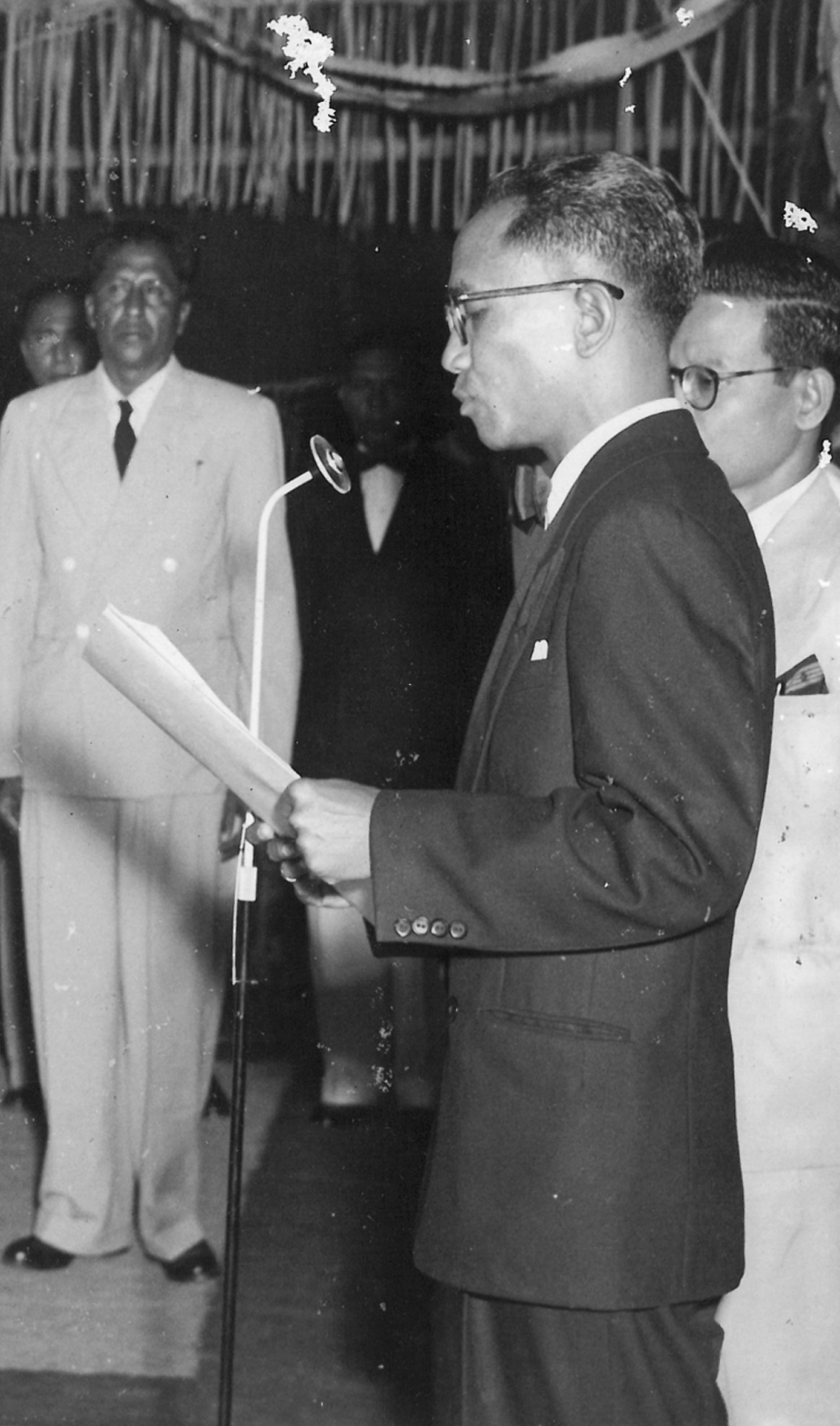
- I Gusti Bagus Oka, former Governor of Bali and Vice-Governor of Lesser Sunda

Governor of Bali
- Acting
- In office 1958–1959
- Preceded by: I Gusti Ketut Pudja
- Succeeded by: Anak Agung Bagus Suteja

1st Vice-Governor of Lesser Sunda
- In office 1950–1958
- Governor: I Gusti Ketut Pudja
- Preceded by: Position established

Office of the Governor for Lesser Sunda
- In office 23 August 1945 – 15 August 1950
- Preceded by: Position established
- Succeeded by: Position abolished

Secretary of Paruman Agung
- In office 1946–1949

Member of the Paruman Agung
- In office 1930s–1940s
- Constituency: Karangasem

Regent of Rendang, Karangasem
- In office 29 January 1934 – 30 June 1938
- Preceded by: I Kadek Rauh

Personal details
- Born: 26 January 1910 Karangasem, Bali, Dutch East Indies
- Died: 22 July 1992 (aged 82) Denpasar, Bali, Indonesia
- Spouse: Gedong Bagus Oka
- Occupation: Public Servant

I Gusti Bagus Oka (Also spelled I Gusti Bagoes Oka) (26 January 1910 – 22 July 1992) was the Governor for the Province of Bali and Vice-Governor for the Province of Lesser Sunda. He and his wife, Gedong Bagus Oka, were the founding members of the Parisada Hindu Dharma Indonesia. I Gusti Bagus Oka was also the first Vice-chair of Parisada Hindu Dharma Indonesia. Throughout his public service career, I Gusti Bagus Oka held various government offices, while Gedong Bagus Oka served as Member of Parliament. The couple were also actively involved in social activity and founded Ashram Gandhi in Candidasa, Bali.

== Early life and movement activist ==
I Gusti Bagus Oka was born in Karangasem, Bali on January 26, 1910. He was born in Balinese aristocracy from Puri Kawan. Although Bali is predominantly a Hindu community, the Muslim community in Sasak, Lombok gave him the title ‘Baginda Usman’, due to historical relationship between Puri Kawan (Western Court) and Lombok Muslims, reflecting inter-religious harmony at that time.

He had access to a public education, a luxury that was unattainable by most of the population in Bali. He married Gedong Bagus Oka, the daughter of village council member in Karangasem. Sharing similar background and vision for Bali, the couple were engaged in political and social activities.

During the Malino Conference of 1946, I Gusti Bagus Oka was one of the representatives from Bali. At that conference, he stated that Bali wanted to become an independent province under the commonwealth of the Republic of Indonesia. I Gusti Bagus Oka was also one of the 57 representatives from Bali for the Denpasar Conference of 1946, which led to the formation of the State of East Indonesia.

== Government ==
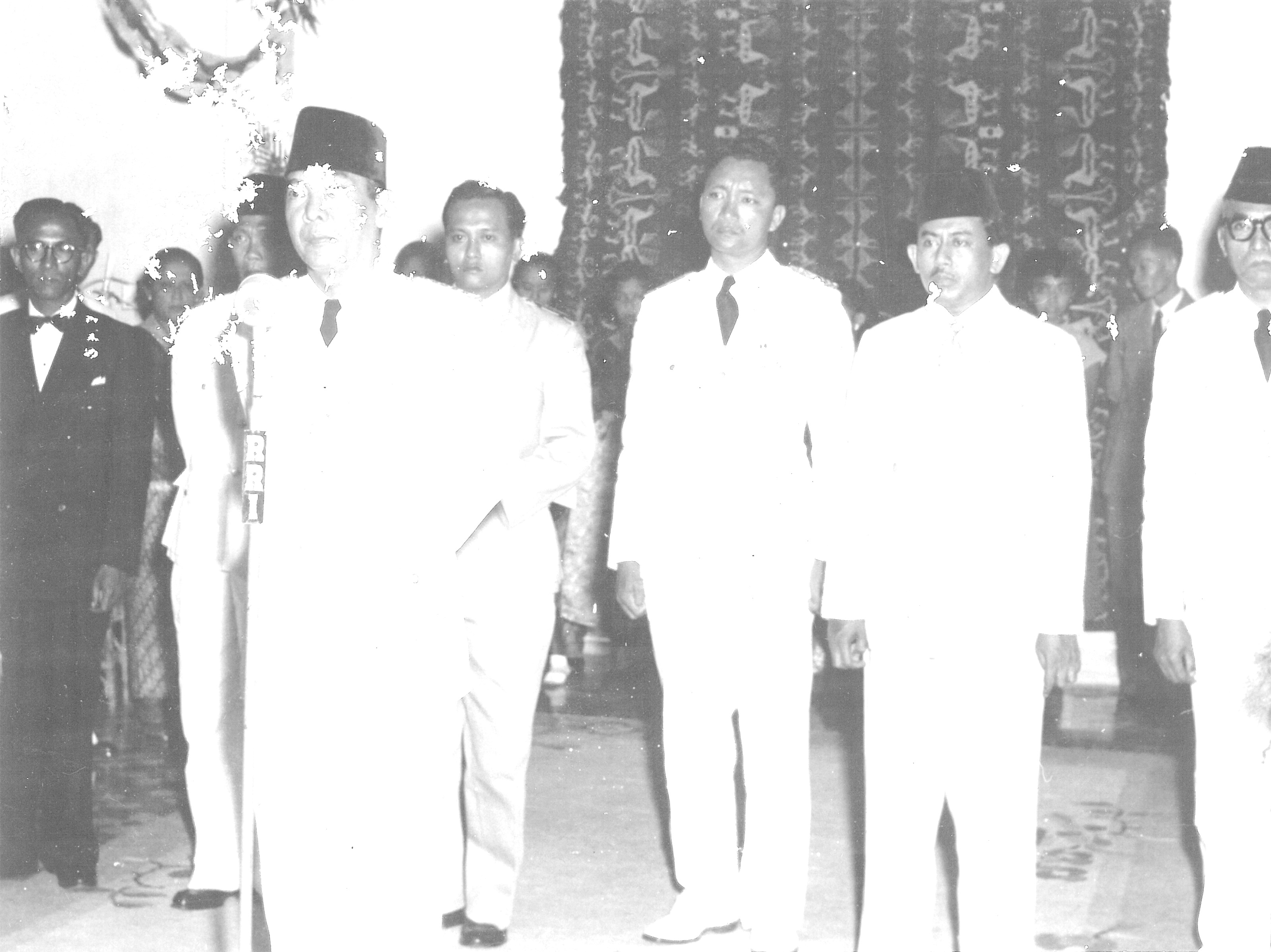
I Gusti Bagus Oka (left) with President Sukarno

I Gusti Bagus Oka’s first public service appointment took place on January 29, 1934 when he took over as the regent of Rendang, Karangasem from his predecessor, I Kadek Rauh. Rendang was an administrative district of Karangasem, under which the renowned Pura Besakih temple is located. I Gusti Bagus Oka’s father, I Gusti Made Bengkel, was also a former regent of Rendang who served between 1894 – 1914 and played an important role in the affairs of Pura Besakih.

After serving as regent of Rendang until June 30, 1938, I Gusti Bagus Oka became a member of Paruman Agung, the legislative body of Bali which consisted of members that were largely elected from Buleleng, Jembrana, Tabanan, Badung, Gianyar, Klungkung, Bangli and Karangasem. I Gusti Bagus Oka served as the Secretary of Paruman Agung between 1946 – 1949.

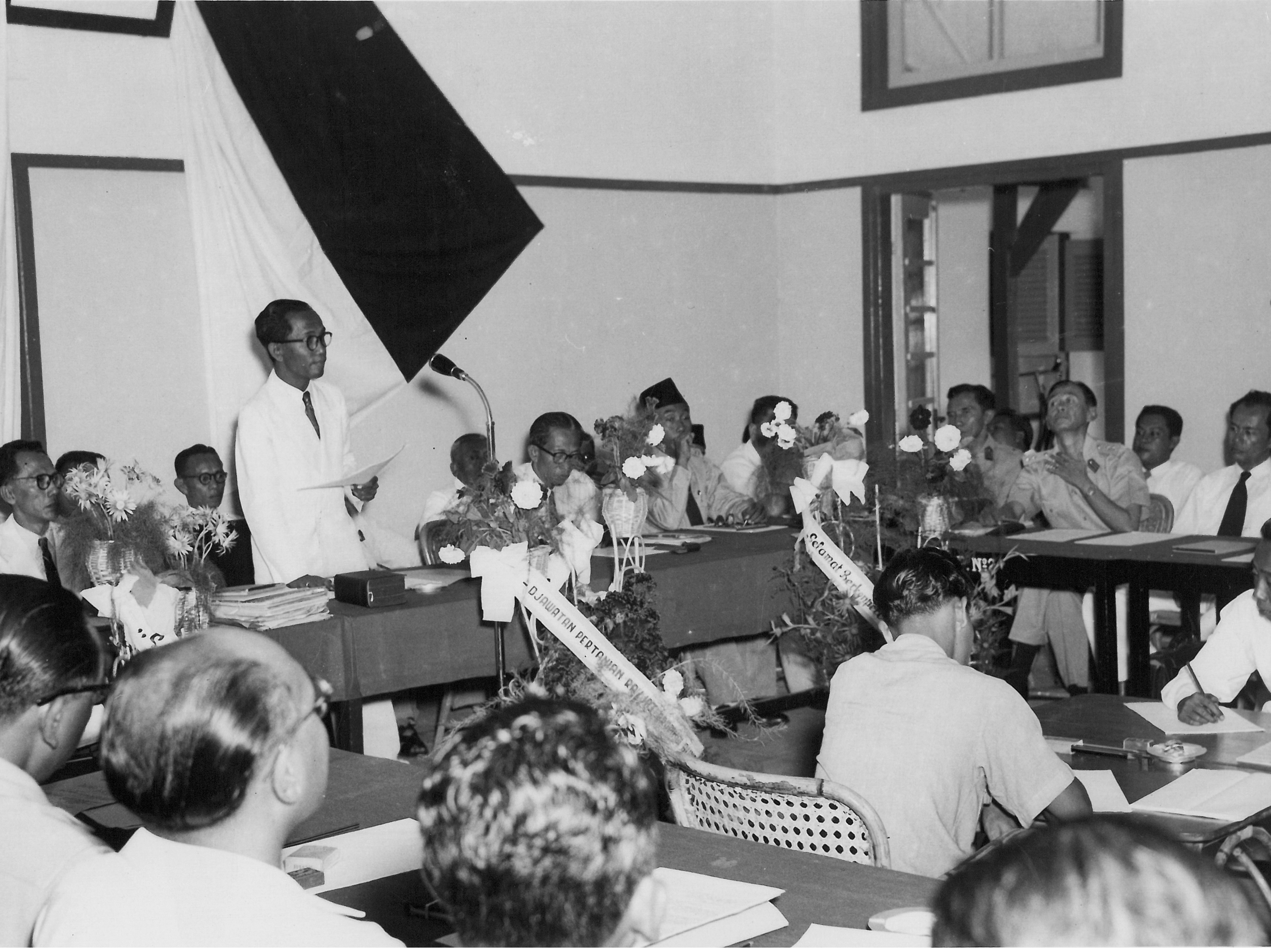
I Gusti Bagus Oka, addressing the public during an open session

Between August 23, 1945 – August 15, 1950, I Gusti Bagus Oka served under the Office of the Governor for Lesser Sunda led by I Gusti Ketut Pudja. At that time Lesser Sunda was a province as part of the State of East Indonesia, with Singaraja as the capital of the province

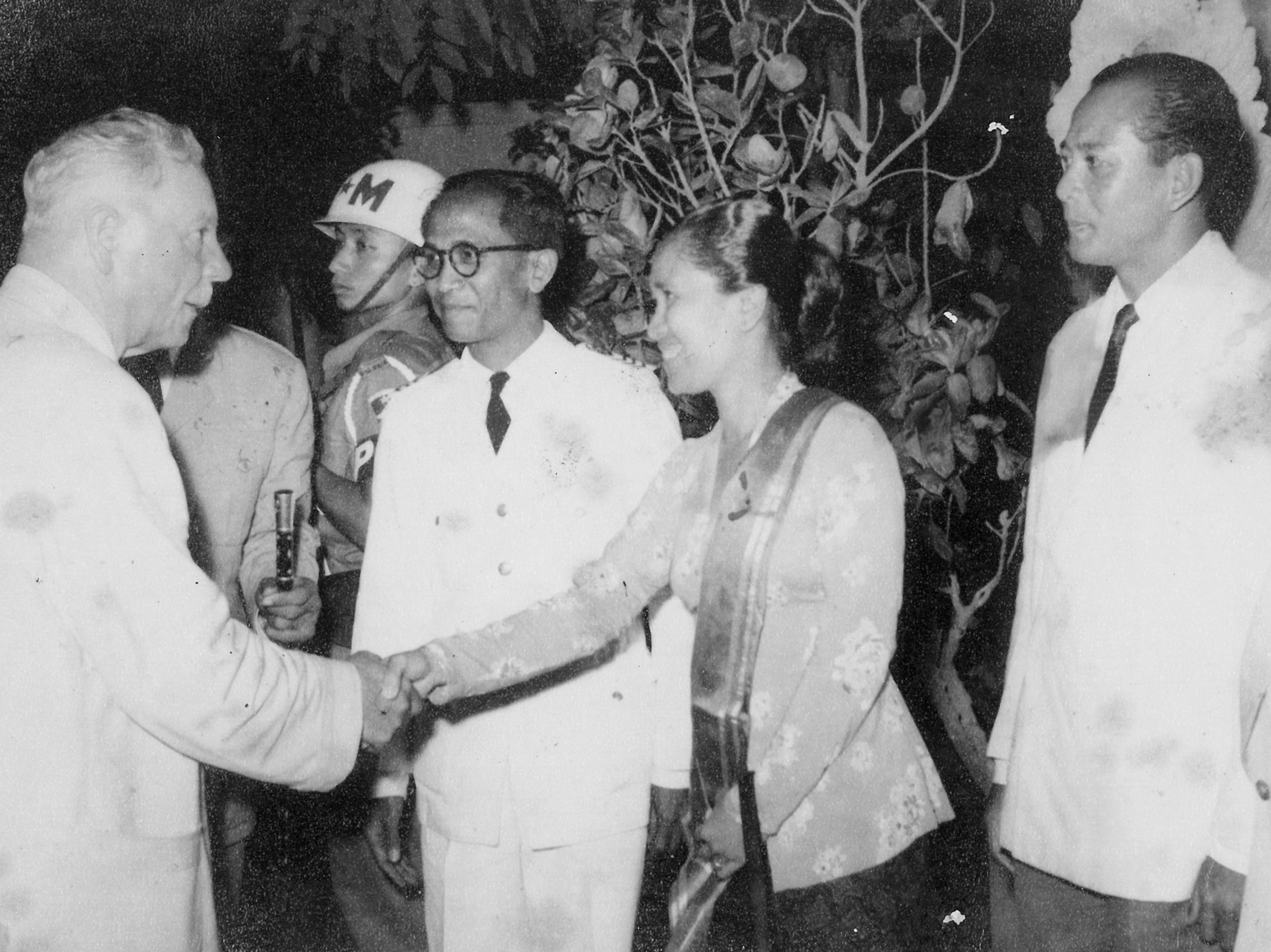
I Gusti Bagus Oka with Chairman of the Soviet Union (Russian head of state), Kliment Voroshilov

With the dissolution of the State of East Indonesia, I Gusti Bagus Oka was appointed to lead the Province of Lesser Sunda on August 15, 1950. As Vice Governor, he oversaw the immediate implementation of bureaucracy reform, starting with the dissolution of the Paruman Agung on September 20, 1950, followed by the establishment of the first provincial parliament on September 25, 1950.

In 1958, the three administrative regions became independent provinces, which led to the dissolution of the Lesser Sunda Province. I Gusti Bagus Oka briefly served as the acting Governor of Bali during a transitional period before he retired from public service in 1959. The creation of Bali as an independent province embodies the idea that was first brought forward by I Gusti Bagus Oka during the Malino Conference back in 1946.
