= Kingdom of Mengwi =

Balinese Kingdom

Kingdom of Mengwi ᬓᬾᬧᬗᬾᬭᬦ᭄ᬫᬾᬗ᭄ᬯᬶ
- 1723–1891
- Anthem: "Negri Bima Sakti" (Bima Sakti land)
- Capital: Kawyapura
- Common languages: Mengwi Balinese (main) Kawi and Sanskrit (religious)
- Religion: Hinduism (Official)
- Government: Monarchy
- I Gusti Agung (monarch title)
  - 1723-?: I Gusti Agung Bima Śakti (first)
  - 1859–1891: I Gusti Agung Ngurah Madé Agung III (last) (under Dutch protectorate)
- Regent
  - 1770/80–1807: Gusti Ayu Oka Kaba-Kaba
- History
  - Established: 1723
  - Civil War: 1891
- Currency: Pesbolong
Preceded by	Succeeded by
Gelgel	Badung Kingdom
- Today part of: Badung: Mengwi

The Kingdom of Mengwi was one of the Kingdomship of Bali that was established in the 18th century. The founder of this kingdom was I Gusti Agung Made Agung, with the title I Gusti Agung Bima Sakti (a descendant of I Gusti Agung Maruti, the last king of the Gelgel Kingdom). The Kingdom of Mengwi came to an end after being defeated by its own kin, Badung, and its allies in 1891.

== Establishment ==
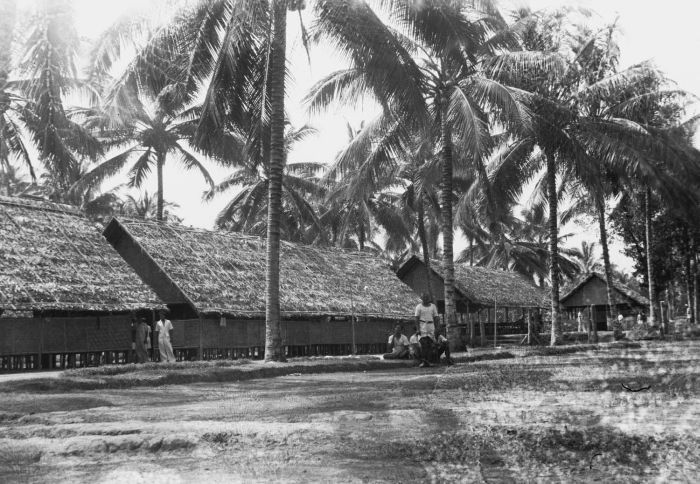
Barracks in Mengwi in 1949

The establishment of the Kingdom of Mengwi began with a conflict between the last king of Gelgel, I Gusti Agung Maruti, and I Gusti Ngurah Jambe in Cedok Andoga. I Gusti Ngurah Jambe was the brother-in-law of I Gusti Agung Maruti but sided with his nephew, Dalem Jambe, who also had a right to become king.

In this conflict, both I Gusti Agung Maruti and I Gusti Ngurah Jambe were killed. The sons and daughters of I Gusti Agung Maruti, I Gusti Agung Putu Agung, I Gusti Agung Made Agung, and I Gusti Agung Ratih then fled to Jimbaran. Afterward, I Gusti Agung Putu Agung and I Gusti Agung Made Agung became rulers of Jimbaran and established the Kingdom of Mengwi and Pura Taman Ayun. The first throne was given to I Gusti Agung Made Agung, while I Gusti Agung Putu Agung chose to become an ascetic (later establishing the Kingdom of Kuramas).

== Politics ==
The Mengwi often waged war with the Badung and the Bugis. In 1829, Mengwi became a subordinate of the Badung. This occurred during the reign of I Gusti Agung Ngurah Made Agung Putra. Mengwi regained its independence after the death of Badung's king, I Gusti Ngurah Made Pemecutan. I Gusti Agung Ngurah Made Agung Putra then returned to power in the Mengwi with authority equal to that of Badung.

== Downfall ==
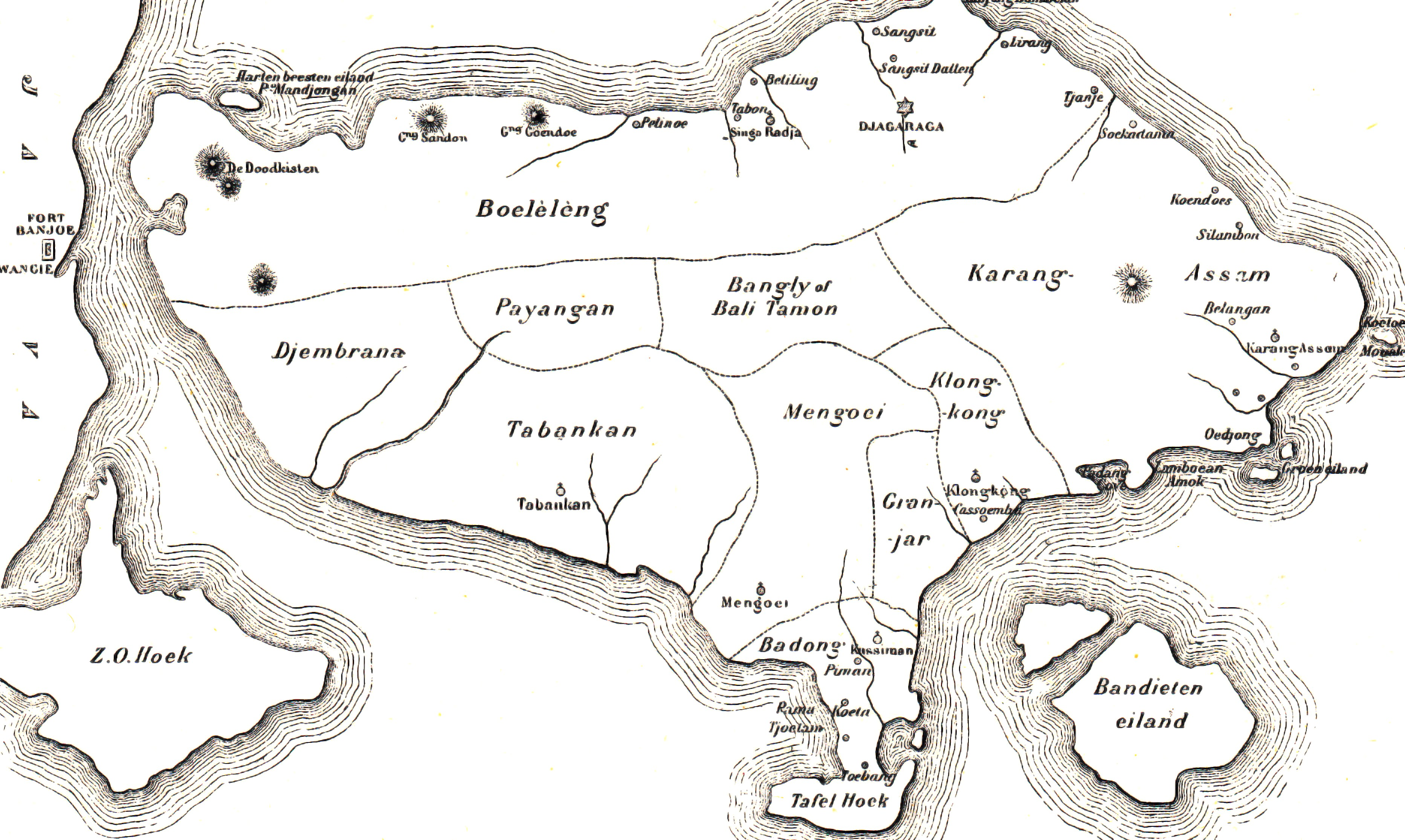
The map of the nine kingdoms of Bali, taken around 1900, showed that the Kingdom of Mengwi is located right in the middle between the Kingdoms of Badung and Tabanan.

In 1891, Badung attacked Mengwi. Badung won the war with the assistance of Muslims from Serangan and Kepaon in Pemogan. During the battle, the King of Badung, Pamecutan III, was assisted by Raden Sastraningrat and his troops from Java.

== Customs and traditions ==
During the reign of the Kingdom of Mengwi, a traditional village, Desa Adat Mengwi (Mengwi Traditional Village), was established in Mengwi. Its authority was to manage customary affairs, the wealth of the customary law community, and the arts and culture of the Mengwi Kingdom's society. Mengwi Traditional Village is still in place and shares leadership with the village chief from the civil government.

== List of Monarch and Regent ==
Here is the list of the kings of Mengwi from the first to the last:

- I Gusti Agung Bima Sakti (First King)
- I Gusti Agung Madé Alangkajeng (Second King)
- I Agung Anom/Gusti Agung Śakti (Gusti Agung Anom) (c. Kerajaan Kapal)
- I Gusti Agung Śakti (Gusti Agung Putu) (c. 1690–1722) [son of Gusti Agung Anom]
- I Gusti Agung Madé Alangkajeng (1722–c. 1740) [son of Gusti Agung Putu]
- I Gusti Agung Putu Mayun (1740s) [nephew of Gusti Agung Madé Alangkajeng]
- I Gusti Agung Madé Munggu (1740s–1770/80) [brother of Gusti Agung Putu Mayun]
- I Gusti Ayu Oka Kaba-Kaba (regent 1770–1780) [mother of Gusti Agung Putu Agung]
- I Gusti Agung Putu Agung (1770/80–1793/94) [son of Gusti Agung Madé Munggu]
- I Gusti Ayu Oka Kaba-Kaba (regent 1793–1807) [grandmother of Gusti Agung Ngurah Madé Agung I]
- I Gusti Agung Ngurah Madé Agung I (1793–1823) [son of Gusti Agung Putu Agung]
- I Gusti Agung Ngurah Madé Agung II Putra (1829–1836) [son of Gusti Agung Ngurah Madé Agung I]
- I Gusti Agung Ketut Bésakih (1836–1850/55) [brother of Gusti Agung Ngurah Madé Agung II]

Under Dutch protectorate 1843–1891

- I Gusti Ayu Istri Biang Agung (1836–1857) [widow of Gusti Agung Ngurah Made Agung Putra]
- I Gusti Agung Ngurah Made Agung III (1859–1891) [descendant of Gusti Agung Putu Mayun]

Mengwi was destroyed by Klungkung, Badung, Gianyar, and Tabanan in 1891.

== Historical remains ==
=== Pura Taman Ayun ===
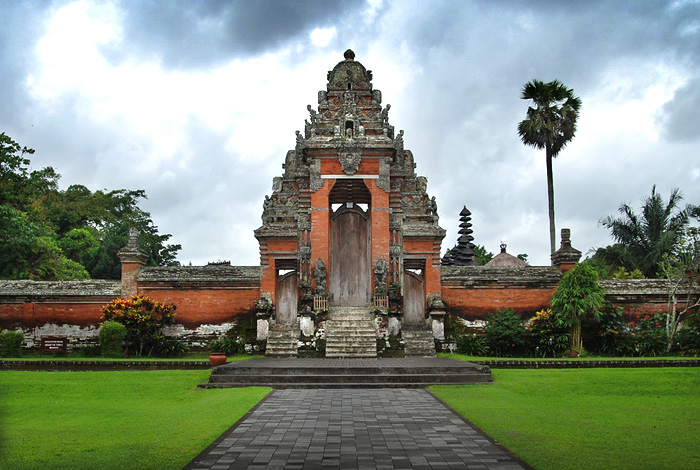
Pura Taman Ayun

Pura Taman Ayun is a place of rest and worship for the family of the Mengwi Kingdom. It is located in Mengwi. Its management is entrusted to descendants of the Mengwi royal family. The temple complex consists of 50 sacred buildings and has two ponds, one inside and one outside the temple. Pura Taman Ayun was built in 1634 and was renovated in 1937. The original name of Pura Taman Ayun was Pura Taman Ahyun, which means "garden of desires." The name was later changed to Taman Ayun, meaning "beautiful garden." During the period of the Kingdom of Mengwi, the temple also served as a source of irrigation for the farmers' fields.

== Bibliography ==
- Alit, Dewa Made (2018). "Bara Agni di Kerajaan Mengwi (1823-1871)". Social Studies. 6 (2): 33–41. Archived from the original on 2020-07-23.
- Arimbawa, Wahyudi; Santhyasa, I Komang Gede (5 July 2017). Prosiding Seminar Nasional Space #3: Membingkai Multikultur dalam Kearifan Lokal melalui Perencanaan Wilayah dan Kota (PDF). Denpasar: Program Studi Perencanaan Wilayah dan Kota, Fakultas Teknik, Universitas Hindu Indonesia. pp. 444–458. ISBN 978-602-73308-1-8. Archived from the original (PDF) on 2022-03-13.
- Kartini, Indriana (2011). "Dinamika Kehidupan Minoritas Muslim di Bali". Masyarakat Indonesia. 37 (2): 115–145.
- Prasetyo; et al. (2017). Inovasi untuk Mewujudkan Desa Unggul dan Berkelanjutan (Edisi Kedua) (PDF). Jakarta: Friedrich-Ebert-Stiftung, Kantor Perwakilan Indonesia. ISBN 978-602-8866-22-4.
- Segara, I Nyoman Yoga (2018). "Kampung Sindu: Jejak Islam dan Situs Kerukunan di Keramas, Gianyar, Bali" (PDF). Lektur Keagamaan. 16 (2): 315–346.
