= Daṇḍa (Hindu punishment) =

Punishments for criminal activity in Hindu law

"Daṇḍa" (Sanskrit: दण्ड, literally 'stick', 'staff', or 'rod', an ancient symbol of authority) is the Hindu term for punishment. In ancient India, the ruler generally sanctioned punishments but other legal officials could also play a part. Punishments were handed out in response to criminal activity. In the Hindu law tradition, the counterpart to daṇḍa is prāyaścitta (atonement). Whereas daṇḍa was primarily sanctioned by the king, prāyaścitta is taken up by a person at his or her own volition. Daṇḍa provides a way for an offender to correct any violations of dharma he or she may have committed. Daṇḍa functions as the ruler's tool to protect the system of life stages and castes. Daṇḍa is part of vyavahāra (legal procedure), which was also a responsibility afforded to the king.

== Purpose of punishment ==
There were two main purposes for punishment in Hindu society. Incapacitation was used to ensure an offender would not be able to commit the same crime again; for example, the hands of a thief would be cut off. Deterrence was the second purpose of punishment. Criminals were punished to set an example to the public in hopes of preventing future offences. Although these were the two main purposes of Hindu Law, other purposes such as rehabilitation were used as means of punishment and correction. Retribution is another theory of punishment but it does not have a prevalent role in Hindu punishment.

=== Incapacitation ===
Incapacitation is a way to prevent the commission of a crime. An offender punished with death, banishment, imprisonment or mutilation permanently or temporarily prevents them from being able to repeat an offence. Many urged the king to amputate the offending limb of a thief to prevent them from stealing again. Cutting off a limb had both a preventative effect and ensured the same crime would not be committed again.

=== Deterrence ===
One purpose for punishment is to prevent or discourage the commission of crimes or unlawful behaviour through deterrence. Deterrence can prevent people from committing a crime or from re-offending. According to the Mahabharata, people only engage in their lawful activities for fear of punishment by the king, in the afterlife, or from others. The main way to deter potential criminals from committing a crime was through the example of offenders' suffering. Manu recommends the king place prisons near a high road where the "suffering and disfigured" offenders could be clearly seen, making imprisonment both deterrent and preventative.

=== Rehabilitation ===
Rehabilitation is another goal of Hindu punishment. Lawbreakers should be punished in a way that improves their character and conduct, and places the offender on the correct path. The Mahabharata recommends the king reform or correct criminals by punishment.

== The punishments ==
The king played a major role in the punishment of his subjects and his duty is discussed in the Manusmrti (Code of Manu). Manu says the king's duty is to render those likely to compromise the public order unable to do so. The only way for the king to maintain the order is with punishment. Punishment is the sole object allowing the king to perform his function and daṇḍa was created in the interest of the king to worsen his subjects (M., VII. 27-29). A common theme, "the logic of the fish", illustrates this idea: without a king to maintain order, the big fish would devour the little fish and it is through the king's punishment the state is maintained.

There is no complete list of what is punishable and to what extent but the king has full discretion to decide it. Manu recommends the King consider the circumstances of the crime and of the offender's ability to bear a penalty. The Dharmaśāstras say because punishment is such a powerful tool, it cannot be delivered by the king without the advice of Brahmins but the king makes the ultimate decision. In the case of sins, Brahmins were in charge of delivering the penance but a sin often constitutes a crime. According to Manu, men who are punished by the king go to heaven like those who performed a good deed. There is much debate on the way penance and punishment worked together.

Although the king could not make a decision without the advice of others, he was able to initiate investigations and administer punishment for certain criminal offences. These offences included violations of a ruler's decree or action against the state itself, according to the Nāradasmṛti. When there was a conflict within a corporate group that could not be resolved, the king was able to intervene and rectify the situation with the administration of his own punishment. The king was in charge of punishment, and was designated to correct human vices and restrain them to lead them to a fulfilling life. Daṇḍa is what made it all possible.

== Ancient texts vs. practice ==
The Dharmaśāstras are written texts that lay out rules dealing with dharma; they are essentially legal texts of ancient Hindu society. These texts were written to describe the ideal behaviour of members of society, and even encompass the method by which one would urinate or defecate. Ācāra is another set of local laws that worked in conjunction with Dharmaśāstras. Dharmaśāstras originated in Ancient India but there have been edits to the original texts. This is an indication the authors of the texts knew members of society were not following what had been written and decided to revise the original contents.

=== Circumstantial factors ===
In the Daṇḍaviveka, Vardhamāna outlines eleven factors affecting the severity of the punishment that will be meted out; according to it:

The caste (of the offender, Contrary to popular belief, the reality is that the punishment for a Brahmin criminal was 64 times more than that of a Shudra criminal.), the thing (involved in the offence), the quantity (of that thing), the utility (of that thing), the person, concerning who the offence has been committed (parigrahaḥ), the age (of the offender), power (i.e., the pecuniary condition of the offender), qualifications (of the offender), the place (of the commission of the offence), the time (of such commission) and the specific offense are the several factors (to be considered, while inflicting punishment).

Every legal system considers mitigating factors but Hindu jurisprudence differs from most. From the beginning of a case, Hindu jurisprudence viewed each case as a sum of all of the factors, and all textually stated punishments are affected by the factors of a given case.

== Types of punishment ==
In his digest, the Mānava-Dharmaśāstra, Manu cites four types of punishment: Vak-danda, (admonition), Dhikdanda (censure), Dhanadanda (fine) and Badhadanda (physical punishments). Vak-danda is the least severe type of punishment; the severity increases in Dhikdanda, Dhanadanda and Badhadanda respectively. Manu also states the types of punishments may be combined to serve as a just punishment. Later authors added two more types of punishment: confiscation of property and public humiliation.

=== Admonition and censure ===
If forgiveness is not possible or desirable, it is seen whether the circumstances of the offence are deserving of admonition. Admonition is to be used first and then censure. Both admonition and censure are the lowest and least-severe of the possible punishments because neither inflict physical pain or loss of property. When using censure, "a good man committing his first offense should be asked: 'Is this your evil action. Is it proper of you?'" Censure is a stronger disapproval than admonition.

=== Fines ===
A fine is to be imposed when damage is done to another person; the amount of the fine is dependent on many factors. In the ancient Hindu tradition, it was generally accepted if a Kshatriya, a Vaishya, or a Shudra was not able to pay the fine, the offender was made to perform manual labour. It was expected Brahmins would pay the fine in installments. The last resort was to imprison the offender if the offender could not perform manual labour. In the modern era, any offender may repay the fine in installments but there cannot be more than three planned installments. According to the ancient Indians, the king must pay a heftier fine for committing a crime because he was the prosecutor of his subjects and was therefore an example for his subjects. In accordance with this idea, the king was made to pay 1,000 Karshapanas when a common man would be fined one Karshapana.

==== Fines for first offenders ====
There were conflicting views on how fines should be imposed on first-time offenders: either levy lenient fines or very heavy fines to prevent the offender from becoming a recidivist. It later became commonplace to base the amount of the fine on the nature of the crime, the ability of the offender to pay, whether or not it was the first offence, and whether an individual or a group had committed the crime. It was thought an individual should be fined a lesser amount because he or she had not conspired to commit the crime with others.

==== Fines and caste ====
The amount of fine varied according to the caste to which one belonged. A Shudra would pay eight times the amount of the damage, a Vaishya would pay sixteen times the amount, and a Kshatriya would pay thirty-two times the amount. A Brahmin would generally pay sixty-four times the amount but could be made to pay up to 100 times the amount of damage. The multiplier was different for each caste because the mental capacity of the offender and the offender's ability to pay the fine were taken into consideration.

==== Fines due to the complainant ====
According to "Crime and Punishment in Ancient Hindu Society":

If a blow was struck against men and animals in order to give them pain, the Judge had to inflict a fine in proportion to the amount of pain caused. If a limb was broken or wound caused, or blood flowed the assailant had to pay to the sufferer the expenses of the cure, or the whole (both the usual amercement and the expenses of the cure) as a fine to the King. He who damaged the goods of another, intentionally or unintentionally had to give satisfaction to the owner, and pay to the King a fine equal to the damage.

The offender must be fined proportionately to damage done, as well as repay the victim. Heftier fines were placed on certain items such as leather, utensils made from wood or clay, flowers, roots and fruits; the fines placed on these items were five times the value of the item damaged.

==== Fines imposed on relatives ====
If there was a connection between the offender and the victim, the fine could have been less than one imposed if no connection exists. This connection could be between master and servant, between people having mutual dealings, between people from the same village, or between kinsmen. According to "Crime and Punishment in Ancient Hindu Society": "Thus if a kinsman sold the owner's property the former was only to be fined 600 panas, but if he was not a kinsman, nor had any excuse he would be guilty of theft".

=== Imprisonment ===
For ancient Indians, the main function of imprisonment was deterrence. Prisons were to be situated near main roads, where offenders could be easily seen. The Dharmaśāstras do not state specific crimes for which imprisonment is required, nor do they do not state how long a prisoner should be kept. The king would decide who would be imprisoned and for how long. People who received stolen property "had to be put in iron fetters, kept on a lean diet, and made to do manual labour for the King till their death". Brahmins could be sent to prison if they had committed a crime that required mutilation but the Brahmin would not be forced to perform manual labour but instead could be made to do menial labour such as cleaning dirty dishes. In ancient Hindu society, Imprisonment was for many crimes, but the Indian Penal Code and Bharatiya Nyaya Sanhita imprisonment is only for heinous crimes.

=== Mutilation ===
Mutilation of body parts is a remnant of the ancient Hindu punishment. It was used when an offender caused injuries to the victim. Mutilation was most typically seen as a punishment in cases of theft, robbery, and adultery as a way of making the criminal an example to the public because the mutilated body was a horrifying sight. Typically, whatever limb the person of the lower caste used to hurt a man of a higher caste would be cut off. Mutilation was also used to deter the offender from repeating the crime. By amputating the limb that was used to commit a crime—for example, stealing cows belonging to a Brahmin resulted in the offender losing half his feet—the offender would physically be unable to commit such crimes again. There were eight main sites of mutilation: the organ, the belly, the tongue, the hands, the feet, the eye, the nose and the ears.

=== Death ===
Under the Indian Penal Code, the death penalty is reserved for the gravest offences: these are waging war against the Government of India, encouraging a mutiny that is carried out; giving false evidence that results in the conviction, sentencing to death and execution of a person; murder under the notion of an eye for an eye; encouraging the suicide of a minor, an insane person or a person who is intoxicated; attempting to murder when harm is caused; and committing murder during a robbery by a gang. For all seven of these cases, there is the alternative of lifetime imprisonment. As of 2023, attempts are made to find mitigating and extenuating factors so the lesser punishment is inflicted. It was commanded the king should avoid capital punishment and instead detain, imprison and repress offenders.

There are some main differences between the ancient and the modern Indian law with respect to the death penalty. In classical India, the death penalty was permissible in a very large number of cases and was not solely prescribed in cases in which death resulted or was likely to result but was extended to cases such as adultery and theft. There were numerous ways to inflict the death penalty, unlike modern India which uses hanging for executions. In modern India, the death penalty is an exception whereas in ancient India it was a rule. Today, the underlying principle seems to be retributive but in classical India it was a means of deterrence. As of 2023, the law in relation to the death penalty is the same regardless of caste or colour but in ancient India, Brahmins were never subject to the death penalty.

=== Other forms of punishment ===
==== Whipping ====
Whipping was done with a whip, cane, rope or similar instrument. Whipping was performed upon women, children, men of unsound mind, the impoverished and the sick. Whipping and the other forms of corporal punishment would only be inflicted if admonition, censure and fines had failed to reform the offender.

==== Branding ====
Branding was often reserved for Brahmins who had murdered another Brahmin, committed incest, stolen gold, or drunk wine. Brahmins who murdered another Brahmin would receive the brand of a human trunk on his forehead. Brahmins who committed incest would receive the brand of a female organ on his forehead. Brahmins who stole gold would have the brand of a dog's foot on his forehead. Brahmins who had drunk wine would bear the brand of a banner on his forehead. After being branded, the Brahmin would be cast out of her or his own country and he would not be welcomed anywhere else due to the brand on their forehead. For all four castes, branding could be avoided if the offender performed the proper prāyaścitta. Men of other castes could be branded and banished if they had an affair with another man's wife.

==== Banishment ====
A person who had been punished by being branded would be banished from her or his community. The idea of banishment after being branded probably originated with the king. No respectable king would want to have offenders displaying such brands in his kingdom. Besides being banished after branding, other crimes would warrant being banished. A Shudra, Vaishya or Kshatriya who gave false evidence would be fined and banished but a Brahmin, who committed the same crime would only be banished. If a man, who belonged to a corporation situated in a village broke an agreement due to greed, his punishment would be banishment. The Dharmaśāstras also proscribe breaking a bone of another person, gambling, and "dancers, and singers, cruel men, men belonging to an heretical sect, those following forbidden occupations, and sellers of spirituous liquor", lest one should be banished. Those who intentionally committed a crime would be banished. If an able person was to sit idly by as a "village is being plundered, a dyke is being destroyed, or a highway robbery committed" would be banished with his or her belongings. Those who damaged a town wall, broke a town gate, or filled a ditch near a town would instantly be banished. A lower caste man who through deceit survived by working in an occupation belonging to one of a higher caste, the king could banish the man and confiscate his property. A defendant who had lost and denied an owed sum of money was to be banished. Assessors who cheated others, took bribes, or gave wrong judgments would also be banished. According to Visṇu and Nārada, those who hypnotize others or play foul should be branded and banished.

==== Confiscation of property ====
In ancient Hindu society, the entire private property of an offender would be confiscated, whereas the Indian Penal Codes and Bharatiya Nyaya Sanhita only confiscate property used in the commission of the crime. In ancient India, there were seven kinds of crimes that warranted confiscation of property; these were officials who accepted money from suitors with poor intentions, Shudras who had sexual intercourse with a woman of a higher caste, Vaishyas who had sexual intercourse with a Brahmin, traders who exported goods over which the king had a monopoly or whose export was forbidden, and officials who were supposed to administer public affairs but were corrupted by wealth and had disrupted the business of another. The furniture of a woman who disrespected her drunkard or diseased husband could be taken. The entire property of a person, unless they were a Brahmin, could be taken if that person had unintentionally committed a crime.

=== Progression of Daṇḍa over time ===
There are some notable differences between the way ancient punishment was to be administered and how modern punishment is administered in Hindu societies. If a criminal confessed to a crime, he or she would receive half of the prescribed punishment in ancient India; in 21st-century India, however, confessing does not mitigate one's punishment. In ancient India, one's caste would affect the punishment she or he would receive but in 21st-century India, caste does not play a role. Modern law in India dictates only laws that have been conceived and are written down may be enforced whereas in ancient Indian law, a person could be prosecuted for a crime that has not been written down if a Sishta, a Brahmin who had studied the Veda, declared the act to be a crime. In ancient India, the wife of a Shudra man could be confiscated if he had an affair with a woman of a higher caste, which would be inconceivable in modern India.

== Varnas and punishment ==
In ancient India, the nature of punishment varies with the varna (social class; varna and caste are not synonymous) of the offender and the offended. As a general rule, when a person of a higher varna inflicted an injury on one of a lower varna, the punishment was less severe than when the reverse was true. The highest varna, Brahmins, were the most-favourably situated and the Shudra varna, the lowest varna, was least-favourably situated.

In 21st century India, many crimes have the same or similar punishment prescribed irrespective of the varna of the offender. In ancient India, Brahmins were banished from the community and branded. In the case of theft, robbery, cheating, murder and treason, there was little distinction in punishment between non-Brahmins. The distinction between punishment for the Kshatriyas and the Vaishyas, was slight. Usually, the severity of punishment was the most severe for the Shudra caste and progressively less for higher castes. In some cases, those of higher varna also received punishment higher than those of the Shudra varna.

== Other punishing authorities ==
Aside from the king, there were two other locations of law: the Brahmins/other community leaders and corporate groups. During the 17th and 18th centuries, a network of Brahmins dealt with disagreements related to the Brahmin community. In most cases, these councils had some relationship with the king but were able to remain autonomous Rather than dealing primarily with disagreements that were already underway, Brahmin institutions worked with questions about the law. A learned Brahmin is said to have knowledge about the Dharmaśāstras and "represented the living translation of Dharmaśāstra principles into real world legal matters ... "

Their power was not limited to resolving disputes solely within the Brahmin community. Brahmins also provided legal guidance to other communities and became a model for corporate governance. Corporate groups in ancient India included villages, castes and military associations. These groups produced laws for their members; the group to which one belonged was determined by birth. According to the historical records of legal practice in ancient India, the lawmaking activities of numerous corporate groups was quite prevalent. These groups "made Hindu law the law ... " Overall, because corporate groups and Brahmin counsels were localized, ācāra became the main component behind their individual legal punishments. In the Yājñavalkya Smṛti, Vijñāneśvara states ācāra had as much authority as the Dharmaśāstras. Supplementary to ācāra and the Dharmaśāstras, the bhāșyas—texts describing judicial procedure—described how laws made from corporate groups should be made, how the ruler should use and interact with the laws, and how punishments should be meted out. There is a conflict between the authority of the Dharmaśāstras and ācāra. The former has the support of the Veda whereas the latter is customary law. To resolve this conflict, the concept of paribhāșa was introduced. These supplemental rules provided interpretations of Dharmaśāstras and ācāra, and removed conflicts between the two. The Dharmaśāstras became a more theoretical approach to law whereas ācāra became a more practical approach to law. Violation of ācāra would necessitate legal penalties.

== Karma ==
Karma is the good or bad that was performed in the previous life. Many writers on Hindu law believe karmic retribution plays a major role in someone's next life. How a human lives in this life, for example their gender or caste, is a reflection of their actions in both their previous life and their current life. Penance is the only way to evade bodily marking that is a consequence of sin. Through this ideology is found a "naturalistic dimension also to the working of the criminal justice system". Mutilation of body parts is an action of the state as a form a punishment. As people can know someone's past sins by whether they were born blind or diseased, it is also known someone was punished by the state if they are missing a limb. The criminal body and sinful body are similar because they both carry the outward manifestations of one's disobedience of the criminal or moral law, and bear the stigma of their corrupt state and status. Other authors think of karma as unimportant in relation to daṇḍa because karma is impersonal and is not inflicted by an agent whereas, daṇḍa has the king or some other official giving the punishment, and because karma is barely mentioned in texts dealing with punishment. The Daṇḍaviveka, a treatise about punishment, contains very little discussion of karma.

== See also ==
- Monarchy in ancient India
- Raja
