= Agung Anom =

Agung Anom (Mengwi) (c. 1690–1722) was a monarch of the Balinese Kingdom of Mengwi. Agung married a princess from the powerful northern kingdom of Buleleng, a daughter of Panji Sakti and used this alliance to extend Mengwi's dominion into Blambangan in eastern Java. He was descended from Gusti Agung, a minister of the Gelgel kingdom who had overthrown its last king in the mid-17th century.
