= I Gusti Ketut Pudja =

Indonesian politician (1908–1977)

- ᬇᬕᬸᬲ᭄ᬢᬶᬓᬾᬢᬸᬢ᭄ᬧᬸᬤ᭄ᬚ
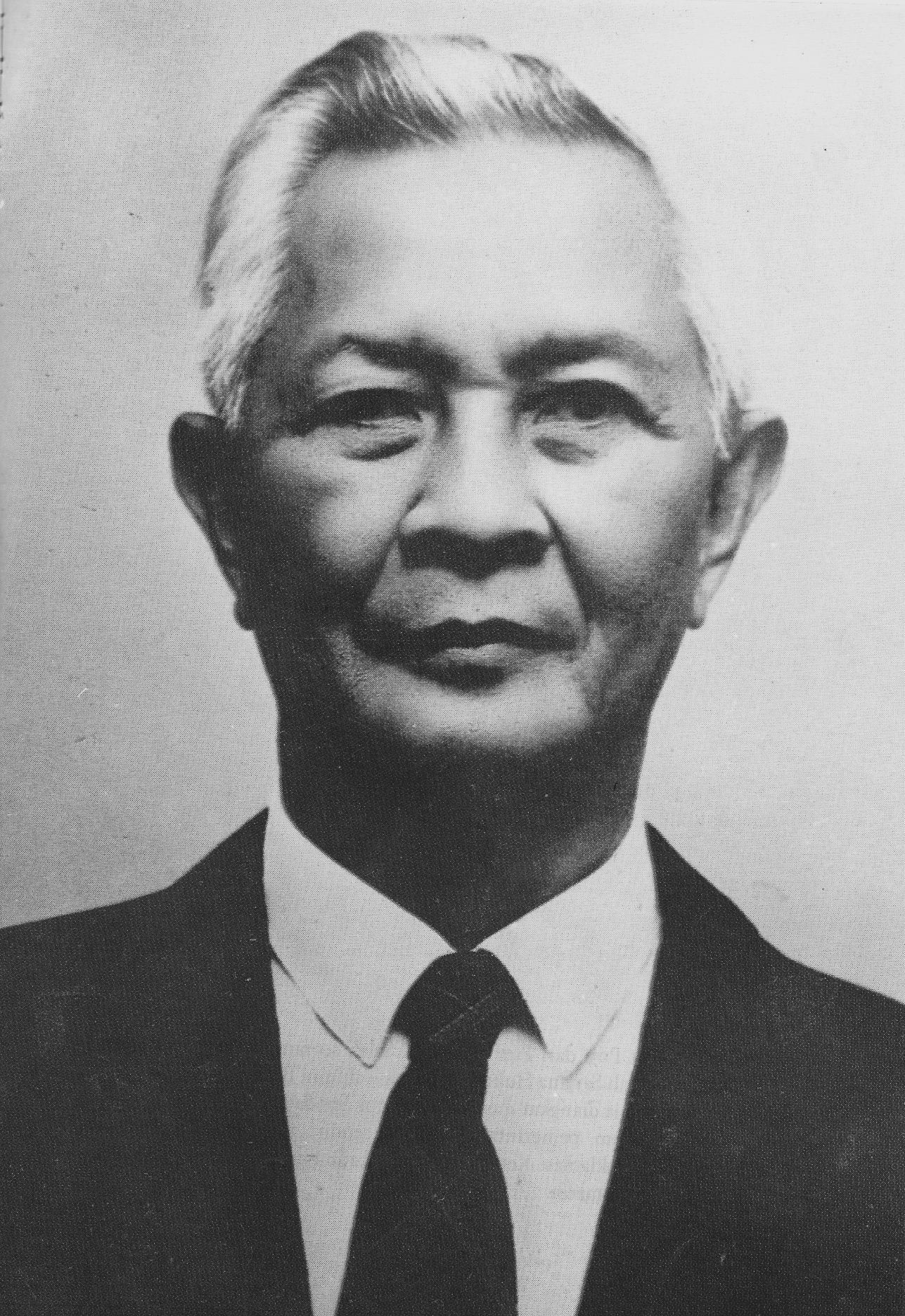
- Official portrait, c. 1945

1st Governor of Lesser Sunda
- In office 19 August 1945 – 29 January 1946 (Note: Pudja handed over power to the Balinese Council of Kings, after his arrest by the Dutch, with Susanto Tirtoprodjo only being appointed as the new governor on 16 October 1950.)
- President: Sukarno
- Preceded by: Office established
- Succeeded by: Susanto Tirtoprodjo (Note: As governor of Nusa Tenggara, which was the province created after the division of Lesser Sunda.)

Chairman of the Audit Board of the Republic of Indonesia
- In office 1960–1964
- Preceded by: Abdoel Kareem Pringgodigdo
- Succeeded by: Sri Sultan Hamengkubuwana IX

Personal details
- Born: 19 May 1908 Singaraja, Bali and Lombok Residency, Dutch East Indies
- Died: 4 May 1977 (aged 68) Jakarta, Indonesia
- Spouse: I Gusti Ayu Made Mirah
- Children: 5
- Parents: I Gusti Nyoman Raka (father); Jero Ratna Kusuma (mother)
- Education: Rechts Hoogeschool

I Gusti Ketut Pudja (19 May 1908 – 4 May 1977) was an Indonesian politician and national hero, who served as the first governor of Lesser Sunda from 1945 until 1946. (Note: Pudja handed over power to the Balinese Council of Kings, after his arrest by the Dutch, with Susanto Tirtoprodjo only being appointed as the new governor on 16 October 1950.) He was a member of the Investigating Agency for Preparatory Work for Indonesian Independence (BPUPK). He was also present at Admiral Tadashi Maeda's house, during the preparation for the Proclamation of Indonesian Independence on 17 August 1945. Making him the only Balinese to be present during the proclamation.

Pudja was born on 19 May 1908 in Singaraja, Bali. He graduated from Rechtshoogeschool in Batavia (now Jakarta), and he started working in the Bali and Lombok Residency Office in Singaraja, in 1935. A year later, he was placed in the Raad van Kerta, a court in Bali at that time. Pudja was a member of the Preparatory Committee for Indonesian Independence (PPKI), formed on 7 August 1945, to continue the work begun by the Investigating Committee for Preparatory Work for Independence (BPUPK). Following the proclamation of independence, he was appointed governor of Lesser Sunda by president Sukarno.

He died on 4 May 1977. On 7 November 2011, based on Presidential Decree No. 113/TK/2011, the government honored I Gusti Ketut Pudja as a national hero. In 2016, Bank Indonesia decided I Gusti Ketut Pudja as one of 12 national heroes whose figures were painted on Indonesia's new currency. The figure of Pudja can be found on the IDR 1,000 denomination.

== Biography ==
=== Early life ===
I Gusti Ketut Pudja was born in Sukasada, Singaraja, Bali, on 19 May 1908. He was the son of I Gusti Nyoman Raka, the Punggawa of Sukasada, and Jero Ratna Kusuma, the daughter of I Gusti Nyoman Ide Gempol. He was the youngest of five siblings. He was initially educated at the Tweede Inlandsche School (TIS), before going to the Hollandsch-Inlandsche School (HIS). He continued his education to the Meer Uitgebreid Lager Onderwijs (MULO) in Malang, where graduated in 1926. He again continued his education to the Algemene Middelbare School (AMS) in Bandung, graduating in 1929, and then entering the Rechtshoogeschool in Jakarta. There, he graduated in 1934, at the age of 26, earning his Master of Laws, and promptly returning to Bali shortly thereafter.

In 1935, he worked at the Bali and Lombok Resident office in Singaraja. In 1936, he was placed in the Raad van Kerta, a court in Bali at that time. During the Japanese Occupation of the Dutch East Indies, he was appointed as a member of the Raad van Kerta, in Badung, Denpasar, and was given the task of setting up the civil government. Thereafter, he was appointed to work at the Chookan office as Redjikan Dairi. In August 1943, he was appointed a member of Syu Kaigi and was later appointed administrative adviser to the Japanese until the end of the war in 1945.

=== Independence Struggle ===
==== Committee for Independence ====
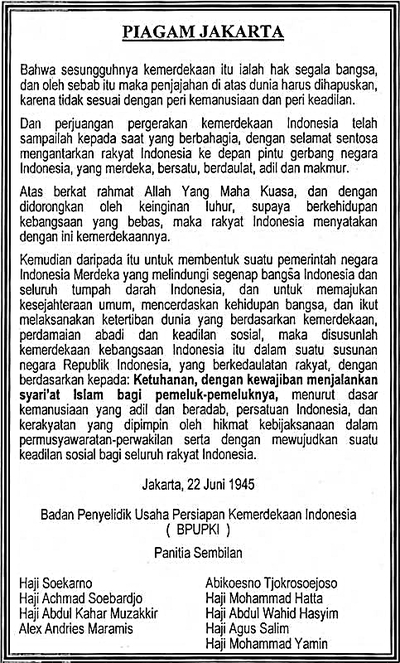
The Jakarta Charter Manuscript written using Improved Spelling system. Sentences containing the famous "seven words" are bolded in this image

On 7 August 1945, the Japanese announced the formation of the Preparatory Committee for Indonesian Independence (PPKI), as a replacement for the Investigating Committee for Preparatory Work for Independence (BPUPK). The PPKI was tasked with accelerating all efforts related to the final preparations to form the Government of the Republic of Indonesia during the waning days of World War II. In the PPKI, Pudja was appointed the representative for Lesser Sunda by Sukarno. He, along with other eastern Indonesians in the PPKI, opposed the first point in the Jakarta Charter, that being the "God with the obligation to carry out Islamic law for its adherents," a point, which had previously been agreed upon by the PPKI. He, together with the people of Eastern Indonesia, suggested that the poiny be changed to one Godhead. The point was finally changed by Mohammad Hatta.

Following the Rengasdengklok incident, Pudja was present at Admiral Tadashi Maeda's house, located at Imam Bonjol street No. 1, Central Jakarta, during the preparation for the Proclamation of Indonesian Independence on 17 August 1945. This made him the only Balinese to be present during the proclamation. Pudja was also witness to the historic moment of reading the Proclamation of Indonesian Independence at Sukarno's house, located on Pegangsaan Timur street no. 56, Jakarta. Following the proclamation, he represented Bali at the meeting of the PPKI held in Jakarta on 18 August 1945.

==== Struggle in Lesser Sunda ====
Then, the-newly as the newly appointed president, Sukarno, appointed Pudja as the Governor of the Lesser Sunda islands on 22 August 1945. The areas under the authority of the Governor of Lesser Sunda included Bali, Lombok, Sumbawa, Flores and Timor, with his home town of Singaraja being designated as the capital. On 23 August 1945, Pudja arrived in his hometown of Singaraja, Bali, carrying the mandate of his appointment as Governor and immediately started his duties. As governor, he began to carry out the mandate from the president to secure the proclamation and seize power from the hands of the Japanese. He exerted political pressure on the Japanese by filing demands. The demands were, the Japanese flag that is flown in offices to be lowered and replaced with the Red and White flag, the use of Japanese time is replaced with the use of Indonesian time, and the atmosphere of war such as restrictions, curfews, and blackouts be ended. These demands weren't met by the Japanese, as Pudja and the Indonesian government were considered illegitimate by them.

Fighting continued to occur between the young Balinese pemuda and the Japanese, in addition to the arrival of the allied troops. A meeting was held on 8 December 1945 with Pudja and the leaders of the People's Security Army (TKR), at TKR headquarters in Denpasar. In this meeting, it was decided to carry out an attack on the Japanese barracks throughout Bali to seize the armories that were desperately needed by the TKR. However, the attack failed, after the plans had been leaked by colonial agents or traitors to the struggle. This resulted in Pudja and other leaders being arrested on 13 December 1945 and detained for one month. Fortunately, the Japanese set them free, fearing continued rebellion if the leaders were not released.

On 2 March 1946, the Netherlands Indies Civil Administration (NICA) returned to Lesser Sunda, to disarm the Japanese soldiers, take care of prisoners of war and maintain public security, they also wanted to meet with Pudja. However, on 11 March 1946, NICA soldier surrounded the Pudja's residence, with Pudja and other leaders being arrested and taken to Denpasar on the grounds that security and order were not guaranteed by the local government. After being released from prison, Pudja briefly fled to the then-capital of Yogyakarta. When the Dutch took over Yogyakarta in Operation Kraai, Pudja was put in jail along with other leaders.

=== Death and legacy ===
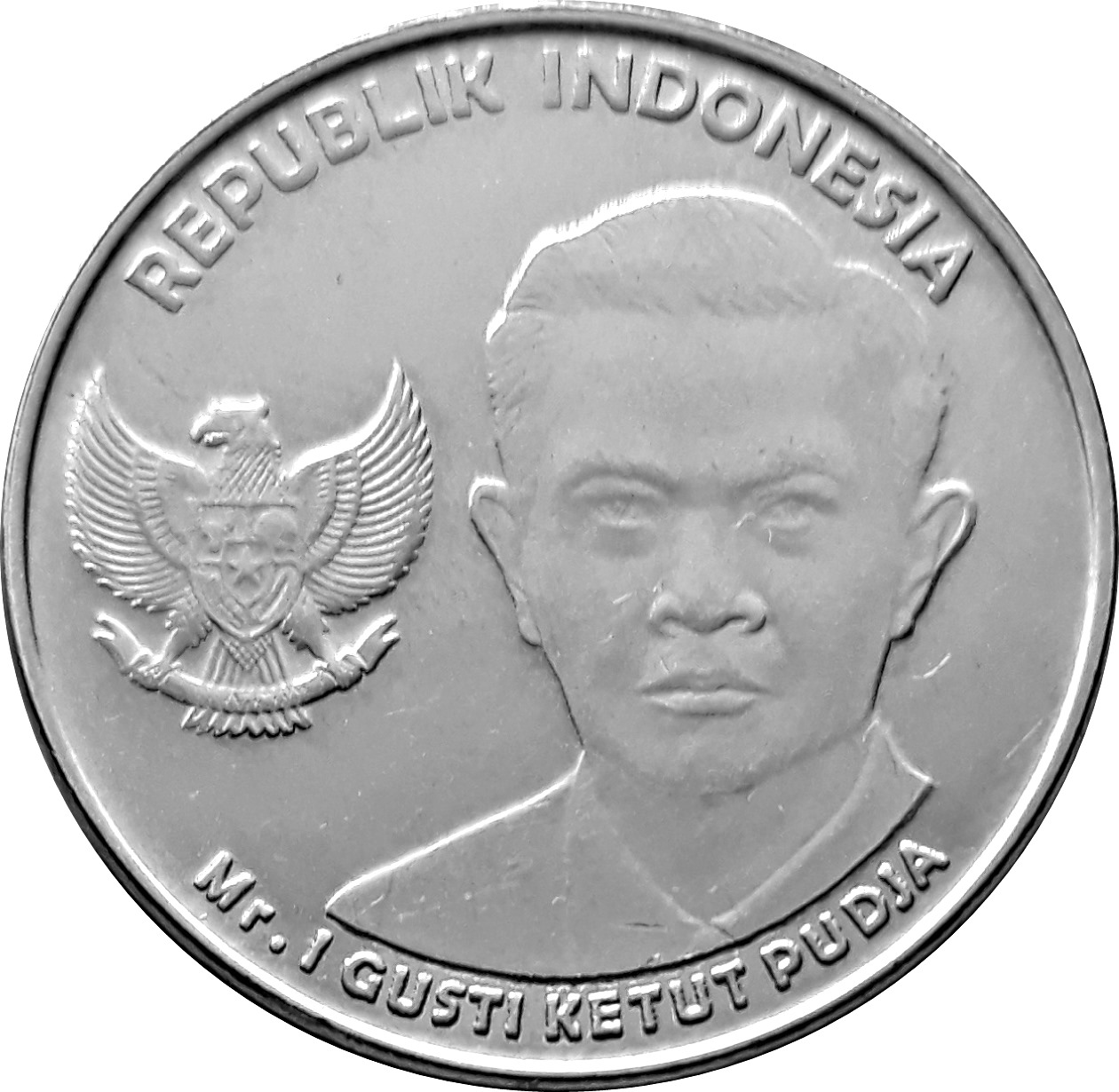
1000 Indonesian Rupiah coin, obverse side, depicting Pudja next to the national emblem.

I Gusti Ketut Pudja died on 4 May 1977, at Dr. Cipto Mangunkusumo Hospital, Jakarta. On 7 November 2011, based on Presidential Decree No. 113/TK/2011, the government honored I Gusti Ketut Pudja as a national hero. In 2016, Bank Indonesia decided I Gusti Ketut Pudja as one of 12 national heroes whose figures were painted on Indonesia's new currency. The figure of Pudja can be found on the IDR 1,000 denomination.

== Honors and awards ==
=== Honors ===
- The former Imaco building in Buleleng, Bali, was renamed after I Gusti Ketut Pudja in 2014.
- His face is featured on the 1000 Indonesian rupiah coin of the 2016 series.

=== Awards ===
- In 1992, President Suharto awarded him the Bintang Mahaputera Utama award.
- In 2011, based on Presidential Decree No. 113/TK/2011, the government honored I Gusti Ketut Pudja as a national hero.
