= Anak Agung Bagus Suteja =

Indonesian politician

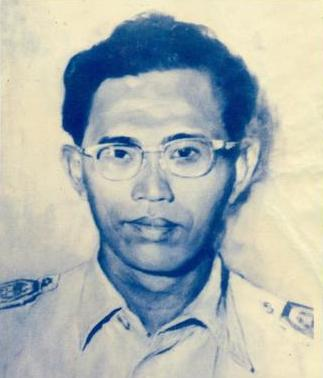

Governor of Bali
- In office 1959–1965
- Preceded by: I Gusti Bagus Oka
- Succeeded by: I Gusti Putu Martha

Resident of Bali
- In office 1950–1958
- Preceded by: Position established
- Succeeded by: I Gusti Bagus Oka

Personal details
- Born: 13 January 1923 Mendoyo, Jembrana, Bali, Dutch East Indies
- Died: 29 July 1966 (aged 43) (disappeared) Jakarta, Indonesia

Anak Agung Bagus Sutedja (13 January 1923 – 29 July 1966?) was the first governor of Bali, appointed by President Sukarno in 1958, when Bali became a province.

== Early life ==
Sutdeja was born in Mendoyo, Bali on 13 January 1923. He was the son of the last Raja of Jembrana, the late Anak Agung Bagus Negara, and was raised in Royal Palace Negara, Jembrana. During the Japanese occupation of the Dutch East Indies, he joined Heiho.

== Career ==
Anak Agung Bagus Sutedja was influenced by nationalist ideas from his school years. After August 1945 he was actively involved with the Republicans in the Indonesian Revolution that strove to expel the Dutch. The Dutch colonial authorities imprisoned him in 1948–49. After Indonesian independence he was appointed regional head (kepala daerah) of Bali by President Sukarno. As an administrator he was known as an incorruptible leftist idealist. Known as a "favoured son" of Sukarno, he was appointed governor when Bali became a province of its own in 1958. He tried to stay above politics, but was sympathetic towards the Communist Party of Indonesia (PKI). After the coup events in Jakarta in 1965, Sutedja was summoned to Jakarta for consultations, and replaced as governor in December that year. On 29 July 1966, four fully-armed soldiers came to his house in Senayan, South Jakarta saying they were taking him to meet with an infantry colonel. He said goodbye to his family, and was never seen again. His political opponent, the Indonesian National Party (PNI), subsequently claimed that Sutedja had opted for nyupat, or voluntary execution, in an effort to end the violence then sweeping Bali, and was stabbed to death outside Jakarta.

== See also ==
- List of people who disappeared
