= I Putu Sukreta Suranta =

Indonesian army commander

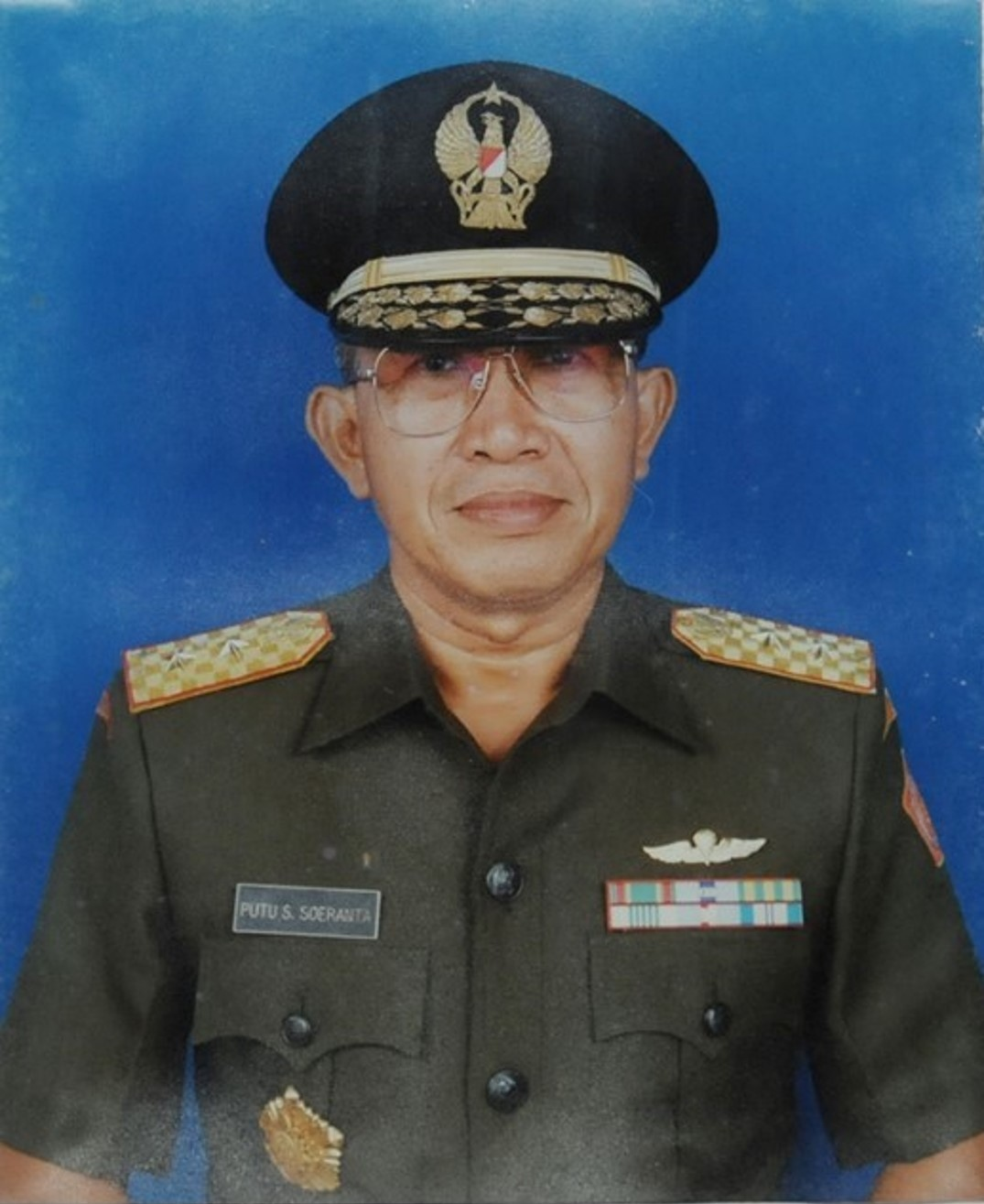

Member of the Supreme Advisory Council
- In office 13 June 1998 – 31 July 2003
- President: B. J. Habibie; Abdurrahman Wahid; Megawati Sukarnoputri

Inspector General of the Department of Defense and Security
- In office 24 April 1993 – 1998
- Preceded by: unknown
- Succeeded by: Farid Zainuddin

Member of the People's Consultative Assembly
- In office 1 October 1992 – 1 July 1998
- Succeeded by: David Napitupulu

Personal details
- Born: 11 April 1938 Klungkung, Bali, Dutch East Indies
- Died: 16 September 2022 (aged 84) South Jakarta, Jakarta, Indonesia

Military service
- Allegiance: Indonesia
- Branch/service: Indonesian Army
- Years of service: 1961 – 1993
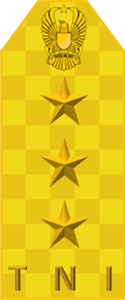
- Rank: Lieutenant General (honorary)

I Putu Sukreta Suranta (11 April 1938 – 16 September 2022) was a high-level commander in Indonesia's army and a major figure in Parisada Hindu Dharma, he is also top figure of Pangestu (Paguyuban Ngesti Tunggal).

== Early life and education ==
I Putu Sukreta Suranta was born in Klungkung on 11 April 1938 as the second child of the three children from the couple I Made Nyaboeh Soeranta and Ni Putu Kerti. After graduating from high school, he attended the National Military Academy in Magelang. He finished his education in the academy and was installed as a second lieutenant in 1961.

== Military career ==
I Putu started his military career as a second lieutenant. Throughout his career in the army, I Putu held various commands, serving as the Deputy Commander of the Seventh Garuda Contingent as well as the Assistant for Operations to the Chief of Staff of the Jakarta Regional Military Command. He refused to pursue an academic degree despite being given the opportunity to do so on several occasions, stating that he wanted to focus on studying military affairs.

I Putu reached the rank of brigadier general around 1986 and became the Deputy Assistant for Operations to the Army Chief of Staff. He was promoted major general about two years later and became the Assistant for Operations to the Army Chief of Staff on 17 March 1988. He served in that position for a year and a half until 30 September 1989 and was subsequently appointed as the Commander of the Armed Forces Command and Staff College on 21 October 1989. I Putu was removed from the office on 16 April 1993 and retired from the military on 11 November 1993.

== Later life ==
After retiring from the military, I Putu was appointed as the Inspector General of the Department of Defense of Security on 24 April 1993. His appointment as the department's inspector general was an oddity, as this position was usually held by active military officers with a three-star rank. Therefore, as he was already retired, the government decided to honorarily promote him to the rank of lieutenant general on 1 September 1997. He was replaced by Farid Zainuddin in 1998.

I Putu was later appointed by President B. J. Habibie to serve in the president's advisory council on 13 June 1998 and become the deputy chairman of the council's commission on people' welfare. The council was disbanded five years later on 31 July 2003.

I Putu was involved in business affairs after his withdrawal from politics. He became a board member in the Yudha Bakti Bank, a bank owned by the armed forces, from July 2007 to December 2018.

== Religious organization ==
I Putu was chosen as the Daily Chairman of the Parisada Hindu Dharma Indonesia (PHDI) at the 7th Mahasabha (Assembly) of the organization in September 1996. Prior to that, since 1992, I Putu already served as a representative of the PHDI in the People's Consultative Assembly.

In 1998, there were demands for I Putu to resign from his post in PHDI, as he allegedly took advantage of his position as daily chairman for political interests. A Hindu student activist in Denpasar remarked that I Putu was unable to allocate his time for PHDI since he was already busy enough with his job at the parliament and the advisory council. There were also demands for him to resign from the People's Consultative Assembly. Although I Putu refused to resign from PHDI and served a full term until 2001, he was removed from the People's Consultative Assembly by Habibie on 1 July 1998.

After serving as daily chairman, I Putu continued to be active in PHDI as one of the chiefs. He also become an advisor for the Indonesian Hindu Youth Association and the Indonesian Hindu Prajaniti. In 2017, I Putu became one of the Hindu representatives that met with King Salman of Saudi Arabia at the Raffles Hotel in Jakarta.

I Putu also held membership in the spiritual organization Paguyuban Ngesti Tunggal (Pangestu).

== Personal life ==
He is married to Niluh Gede Murwaningish. The couple have four children.

I Putu died on 16 September 2022 at the Pondok Indah Hospital in South Jakarta. He was buried at the Kalibata Heroes' Cemetery three days later in a military ceremony.
