= Ratu Bagus =

Indonesian Hindu guru

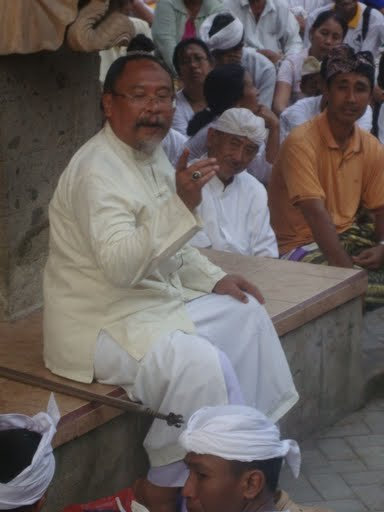
- Om Swastiastu

Personal life
- Born: November 1949 Gianyar, Bali
- Died: 12 August 2021 (aged 71) Denpasar, Bali

Religious life
- Religion: Hinduism

Religious career
- Based in: Bali
- Website: www.ratubagus.com

Ratu Bagus (November 1949 – 12 August 2021) was an Indonesian guru based in Bali, who developed a technique of Shaking Meditation, which he called "Bio-energy Shaking Meditation." He was said to transmit healing energy through his touch and picture, induce spontaneous shaking and laughing in the recipients, as well as to release them from physical, emotional, mental and spiritual blocks. Ratu Bagus following in the world has grown to include many shaking groups in Europe and Australia as well as one group in the United States of America.

== See also ==
- Energy (esotericism)
- Meditation
- Shaktipat
