= Gusti Ayu Oka Kaba-Kaba =

Gusti Ayu Oka Kaba-Kaba was a queen regent of Mengwi, one of the nine Kingdoms that composed the Kingdom of Bali in Bali, twice: for her son in 1770-1780, and for her grandson 1793-1807.

== Life and regencies ==
Gusti Ayu Oka Kaba-Kaba was married to Gusti Agung Made Munggu, King of Mengwi (r. 1740s-1770). When her husband died, she ruled as regent for her son Gusti Agung Putu Agung between 1770 and 1780.

When her son died in 1793, she ruled as regent for her son Gusti Agung Ngurah Madé Agung I (d. 1829) between 1793 and 1807.
