= Gusti Ayu Istri Biang Agung =

Gusti Ayu Istri Biang Agung was queen regent of Mengwi, a principality in East Bali, from 1836–1857.

She was the widow of Gusti Agung Ngurah Made Agung Putra.
