= Sathasi Raj =

Royal Family of the East: Sathasi Raj (known as Rudrapur)
- Town (previous: kingdom)
- Location in Uttar Pradesh, India
- Coordinates: 26°26′35″N 83°36′36″E
- Country: India
- State: Uttar Pradesh
- District: Deoria

Government
  - Title: Rai Bahadur

Population (2001)
  - Total: 28,324

Languages
  - Official: bhojpuri
- Time zone: UTC+5:30 (IST)

Sathasi Raj was the Kingdom of Raja of Rudrapur covering many parts of modern-day districts of Deoria and Maharajganj and the surrounding districts in the British era (acting as princely states).

It was merged to the kingdom of Bhumihar rulers of kashi during the period of Maharaja Balwant Singh of Benaras and later to the British company after the maharaja's rebellion.

== Background ==
Rudrapur is a town and a nagar panchayat in Deoria district in the Indian state of Uttar Pradesh. It was previously known as Sathasi Raj.

== History ==
According to one existing version, the founding members of the Sathasi royal family are said to have come from Awadh, Benaras and from the banks of the Rapti river.

During the First War of Independence of 1857, the British government's repression was at its peak. At that time, Rudrapur's Satasi Raj worked to give the British a hard time.

The fort of Satasi Raj is still present in its original form in the city of Baba Dudheshwarnath. In 1857 when the British looted the treasure from Gorakhpur and reached Raapti River via Gazipur, Raja Udit Narayan Singh attacked the white army with his army of 100,000 infantry. The river turned red with the blood of the white soldiers. Enraged by the defeat, the British called for military force from Bihar and Nepal and attacked Sathasi Raj. A fierce battle took place between the two armies. When the white army used up all their ammunition and were on the verge of losing, then under an agreement, they had to release the arrested soldiers of Satasi Raj.

A few days later, Zafar Muhammad Hasan marched with Satasi Raj to liberate Gorakhpur. After this incident, there was panic among the British. The white soldiers, troubled by the sudden attack, ran away. When the British Brigadier Freder got to know about this, he captured Gorakhpur again with the help of Gorkha soldiers. Years later the British punished King Udit Narayan Singh of Satasi Raj with Kala Pani.

The maharaja (monarchical) system was abolished by Indian Constitution in 1971 with some acceptable privileges. The fort of the Sathasi Raj or Fort of Rudrapur (Rudrapur ka kila) given to Krishnanand Rai still exists today and people visit to see the palace or fort.^{[2]}
