= Parisada Hindu Dharma Indonesia =

Hindu organisation

- Abbreviation: PHDI
- Formation: 1959
- Type: Religious and Social
- Legal status: Active
- Purpose: Advocacy, preservation, and promotion of Hindu teachings and culture in Indonesia
- Headquarters: Denpasar, Bali, Indonesia
- Members: Millions of Hindus across Indonesia
- Dharma Adhyaksa: Ida Pedanda Nabe Gde Bang Buruan Manuaba
- Chairman: Mayor General (Ret.) Wisnu Bawa Tenaya
- General Secretary: I Ketut Budiasa, S.T., M.M
- Main organ: National Congress
- Affiliations: Indonesian Ministry of Religious Affairs, Hindu organizations globally
- Budget: Undisclosed (non-profit funded via donations and government grants)
- Staff: Not publicly disclosed
- Volunteers: Not publicly disclosed
- Website: Official Website PHDI
- Remarks: Key organization for Hindu advocacy in Indonesia

Parisada Hindu Dharma Indonesia (Indonesian Hindu Dharma Society) is a major reform movement and organization that assisted in maintaining recognition of Balinese Hinduism and the revival of Hinduism in Indonesia. It was started in 1959 by Ida Bagus Mantra and led by Gedong Bagus Oka.

== Creation ==
It lobbied for the rights of Hindus in Bali after Hinduism became a state sponsored religion (along with Buddhism, Islam, Protestantism, and Catholicism) in 1959. From 1960–64 it was known as Parisada Hindu Dharma Bali. In 1964 however it began to stress a religious rather than regional character and changed its name to Parisada Hindu Dharma Indonesia.

== Religious efforts ==
It sent out many Balinese missionaries to outlying areas like Medan.

== In politics ==
It is the highest religious body in Bali and is given an official sanction by the government to look into matters of Hindu law. The PHDI in this manner has become a rallying organization for the preservation of Hindu customs.

The PHD has contested Indonesia's demographic counts, saying that the 6,501,680 count (given by the government of Indonesia) grossly undercounts the Hindu population, stating that it is closer to 18 million.

== On law ==
The Parisada has lobbied for building restrictions near temples and places of worship in Bali.

== Major figures ==
- Gedong Bagus Oka – founder
- Ketut Wiana – Balinese religious figure
- Putu Alit Bagiasna - Balinese religious figure
- Putu Sukreta Suranta – Indonesian lieutenant general – former head of PHDI
