= Ida Bagus Nyoman Rai =

Indonesian artist

Ida Bagus Nyoman Rai (~1915-2000) was a traditional Balinese painter from Sanur, a beach resort near Denpasar, Bali, Indonesia. He was also known as I Bagus Nyoman Rai Tengkeng or Ida Bagus Nyoman Rai Klingking

== Biography ==
He was born in Sanur, Bali, Indonesia between 1907 and 1920. Ida Bagus Nyoman Rai came from a Brahmin family and began painting as a teenager. During the birth of the Pitamaha Art Association in the 1930s, Ida Bagus Nyoman Rai and other Sanur painters started selling drawings depicting the fisherman's life at the suggestion of Neuhaus brother who owned a tropical fish shop in Sanur. Ida Bagus Nyoman Rai till his death drew mostly black and white drawings on paper.

Beached Whale, Ida Bagus Nyoman Rai, Ink wash on canvas

During the 1930s he was befriended by a Swiss artist, Theo Meier (1908–1982) who became his first and loyal patron. Many of his works were found in the Theo Meier Estate that was sold in 2002. After the Second World War, he was befriended by the Australian artist Donald Friend who lived in Bali from 1968 to 1980 and had a house in Jimbaran beach. He was one of a few Balinese painters of his generation who produced drawings capturing historical events around their village. Several of his drawings depicted beached whales that often stranded on the shores of the Sanur beach. He also documented events during the Japanese occupation. One such work was recently found in the estate of Theo Meier. He died in 2000.

== Works ==
His works are scattered around the world in museums and private collectors. His works can be found at the National Gallery of Australia, Tropenmuseum in Amsterdam, Ethnographic Museum in Leiden, and the Museum der Kulturen in Basel, Switzerland. In Bali, his works can be viewed at the Neka Art Museum, Agung Rai Art Museum and the Museum Puri Lukisan.

Reproductions of his paintings can be seen in the book Art in Indonesia (Claire Holt, page 187), Guide to Bali (Hans Hoefer, always on a different page for each reprint). [3]

Ida Bagus Nyoman Rai's painting, Mount Agung Meletus (1968), collected by the Neka Art Museum was included in the 1990-1991 KIAS (Indonesian Culture in the United States) exhibition. [3]
