= Punggawa =

Punggawa is a title for a traditional local administrator, used in various parts of Indonesia such as Bali, Lombok and some part of Java

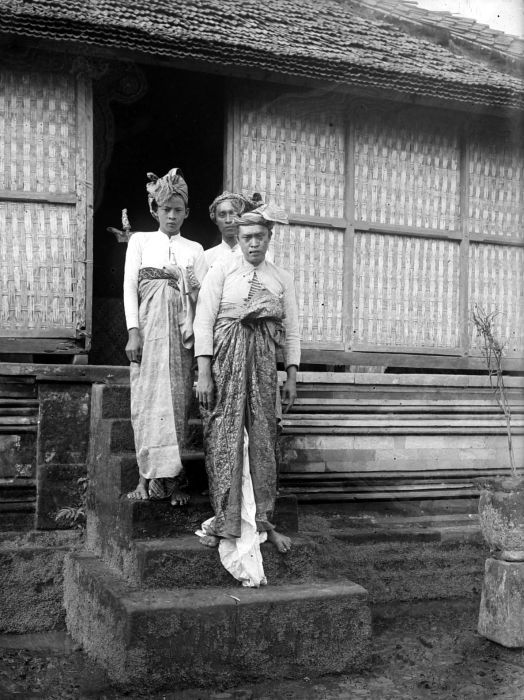
Karangasem Balinese Punggawa in Lombok 1800s

The punggawa held the function of a hereditary vassal lord of a district, subservient to the raja. The term originally applied to the northern kingdom of Buleleng, the southern district chiefs being known as manca or manca agung. With the Dutch conquest of Bali in 1906-1908, the term was applied by colonial administration to the entire island. On Sulawesi, the term was used for chiefs serving under a major lord, in the form of pongawa. In Javanese culture the punggawa is a court official in shadow plays (wayang).
