= Gedong Bagus Oka =

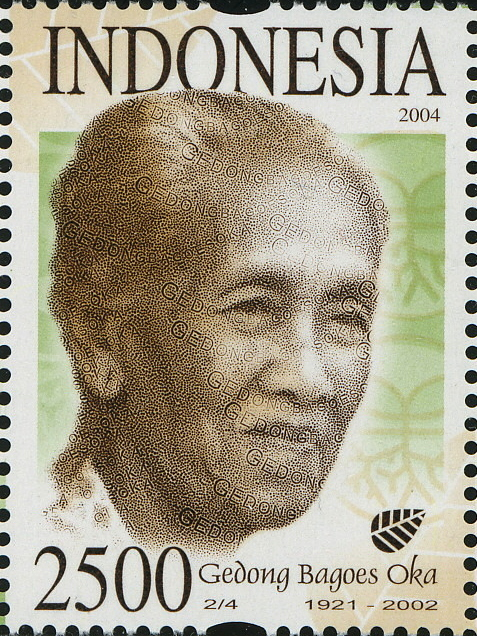

Personal life
- Born: Ni Wayan Gedong; October 3, 1921
- Died: November 14, 2002 (aged 81)
- Honors: Parisada Hindu Dharma

Religious life
- Religion: Hinduism

Gedong Bagus Oka (October 3, 1921 – November 14, 2002) was a Hindu reformer and philosopher in Indonesia. She was one of the foremost authorities on Agama Hindu Dharma and started the Parisada Hindu Dharma Indonesia movement in the 1980s. She was a recipient of the 1994 Jamnalal Bajaj Award.

== Early life ==
Gedong was born with the name Ni Wayan Gedong in Karangasem as the daughter of the couple I Komang Layang and Ni Komang Pupuh, a member of the village council. Unlike most females at the time, the young Gedong was given the freedom by her parents to undertake all of her wishes. She was allowed to go to school. So she went to study in Yogyakarta and Jakarta.

At school in Yogyakarta, she had the liberty to study Christianity. Her understanding about Christianity and her birth in the Hindu tradition caused her to befriend Mahatma Gandhi. They discussed Christian and Hindu philosophy.

The understanding about these two religions made her a follower of Hindu spirit, that is ahiṁsā (non violence) and satya (truth).
