= Mengwi =

District in Badung Regency, Bali Province, Indonesia

Coordinates: 8.5500°S 115.1667°E

Mengwi (Balinese script: ᬫᭂᬗ᭄ᬯᬶ) is an administrative district (kecamatan) in the Badung Regency of Bali Province, Indonesia and is situated to the north of Bali's heaviest tourist regions, which lie in Kuta District (including Seminyak and Legian) and North Kuta District (including Canggu, Kerobokan and Dalung). Mengwi District covers an area of 81.82 km^{2} and had a population of 122,829 at the 2010 Census and 132,786 at the 2020 Census. The official estimate as at mid 2025 was 134,951.

Mengwi district within Badung Regency, Bali

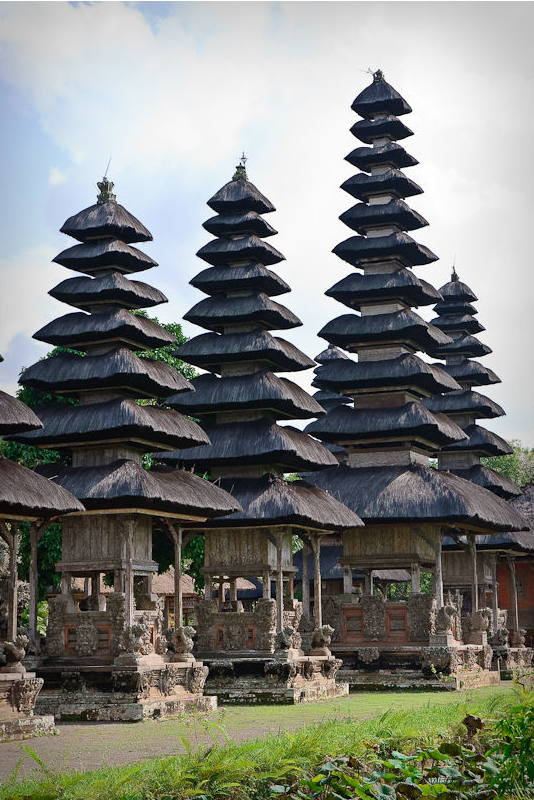
Taman Ayun temple in Mengwi

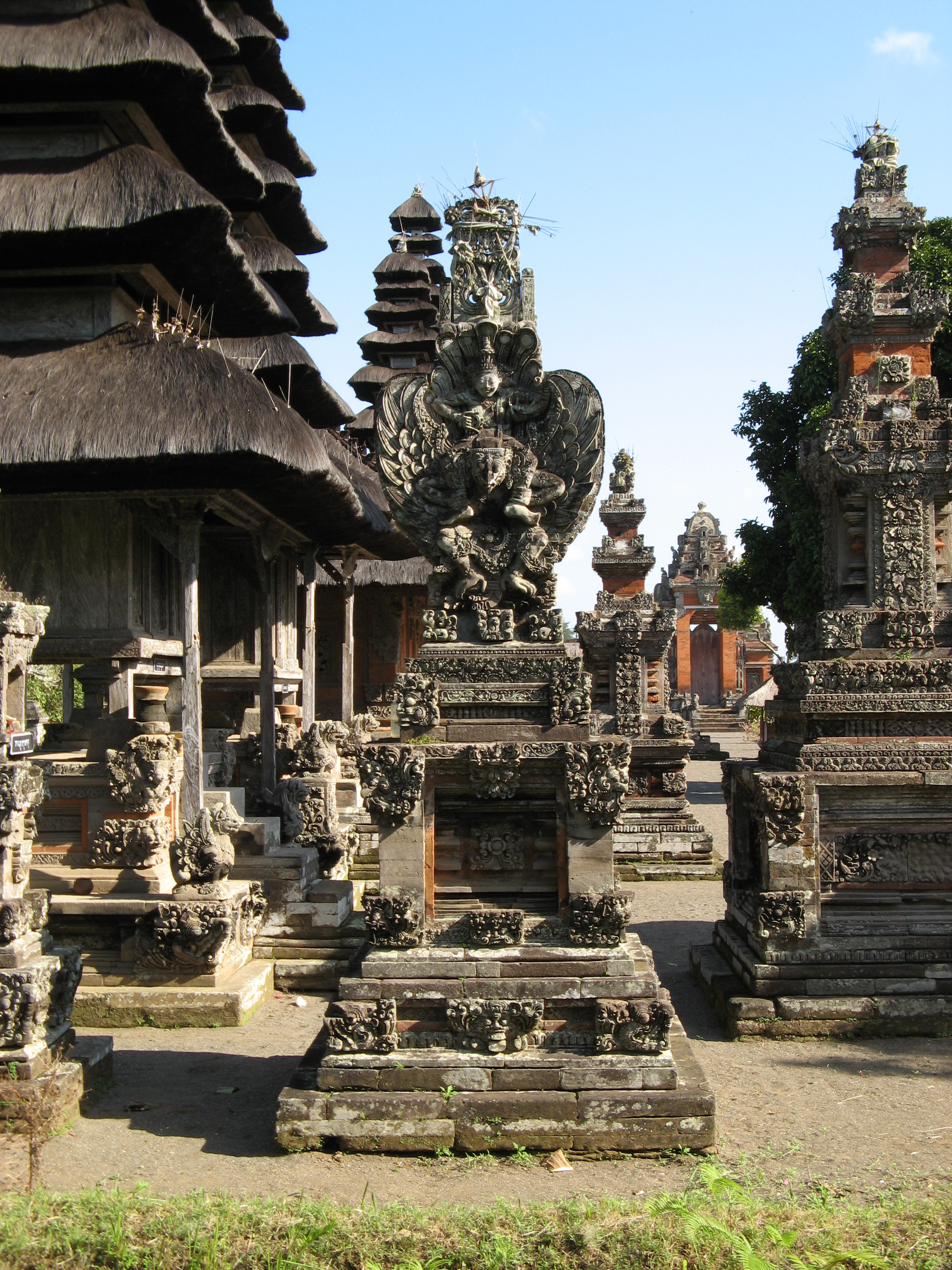
Taman Ayun temple, Garuda Shrine

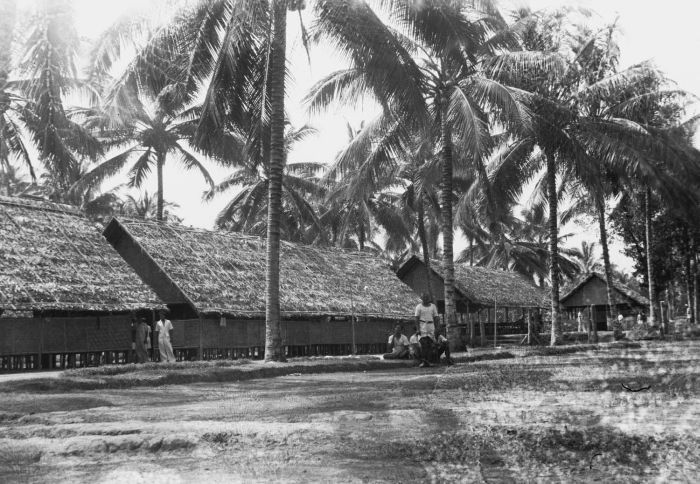
Barracks in Mengwi in 1949

== Villages in Mengwi district ==
The district is composed of 20 villages, of which five have the status of kelurahan (urban, indicated by asterisks below) and 15 are rural desa:

Kode Wilayah	Name of village	Area in km^{2}	Pop'n Estimate mid 2025
51.03.02.2017	Cemagi ^{(1)}	4.75	5,504
51.03.02.2001	Munggu ^{(1)}	6.84	7,504
51.03.02.2018	Pererenan ^{(1)}	2.61	3,414
51.03.02.2019	Tumbak Bayuh ^{(1)}	2.74	3,721
51.03.02.2002	Buduk ^{(1)}	3.36	9,532
51.03.02.1014	Abianbase *	4.11	7,875
51.03.02.1005	Sempidi *	2.61	7,600
51.03.02.1015	Sading *	2.96	8,910
51.03.02.1016	Lukluk *	4.08	8,431
51.03.02.1004	Kapal *	5.49	12,367

Kode Wilayah	Name of village	Area in km^{2}	Pop'n Estimate mid 2025
51.03.02.2010	Kekeran	4.27	4,026
51.03.02.2003	Mengwitani	4.45	8,546
51.03.02.2009	Mengwi	2.14	8,369
51.03.02.2012	Gulingan	5.22	8,673
51.03.02.2006	Penarungan	4.10	7,647
51.03.02.2008	Baha ^{(2)}	5.47	4,031
51.03.02.2013	Werdi Bhuwana ^{(2)}	3.39	5,458
51.03.02.2011	Sobangan ^{(2)}	3.35	3,997
51.03.02.2007	Sembung ^{(2)}	6.36	6,204
51.03.02.2020	Kuwum ^{(2)}	3.52	3,142
51.03.02	Totals	81.82	134,951

Note the first five villages listed, marked with "(1)", are in the south corner of the district, on or close to the southwest coast; they had a combined population of 29,675 in 2025.
The last five villages listed, marked with "(2)", are in the north of the district, and thus furthest inland; they had a combined population of 22,832 in 2025.

The Mengwi village itself is located almost halfway between Ubud and Bali's southwest coast, located just slightly closer to Ubud. The majority of visitors to the village come from more tourist-centric areas of the island and are just passing through for a chance to experience a traditional Balinese village.

== See also ==
- Kingdom of Mengwi
