= 2008 Bali gubernatorial election =

Local election in Indonesia

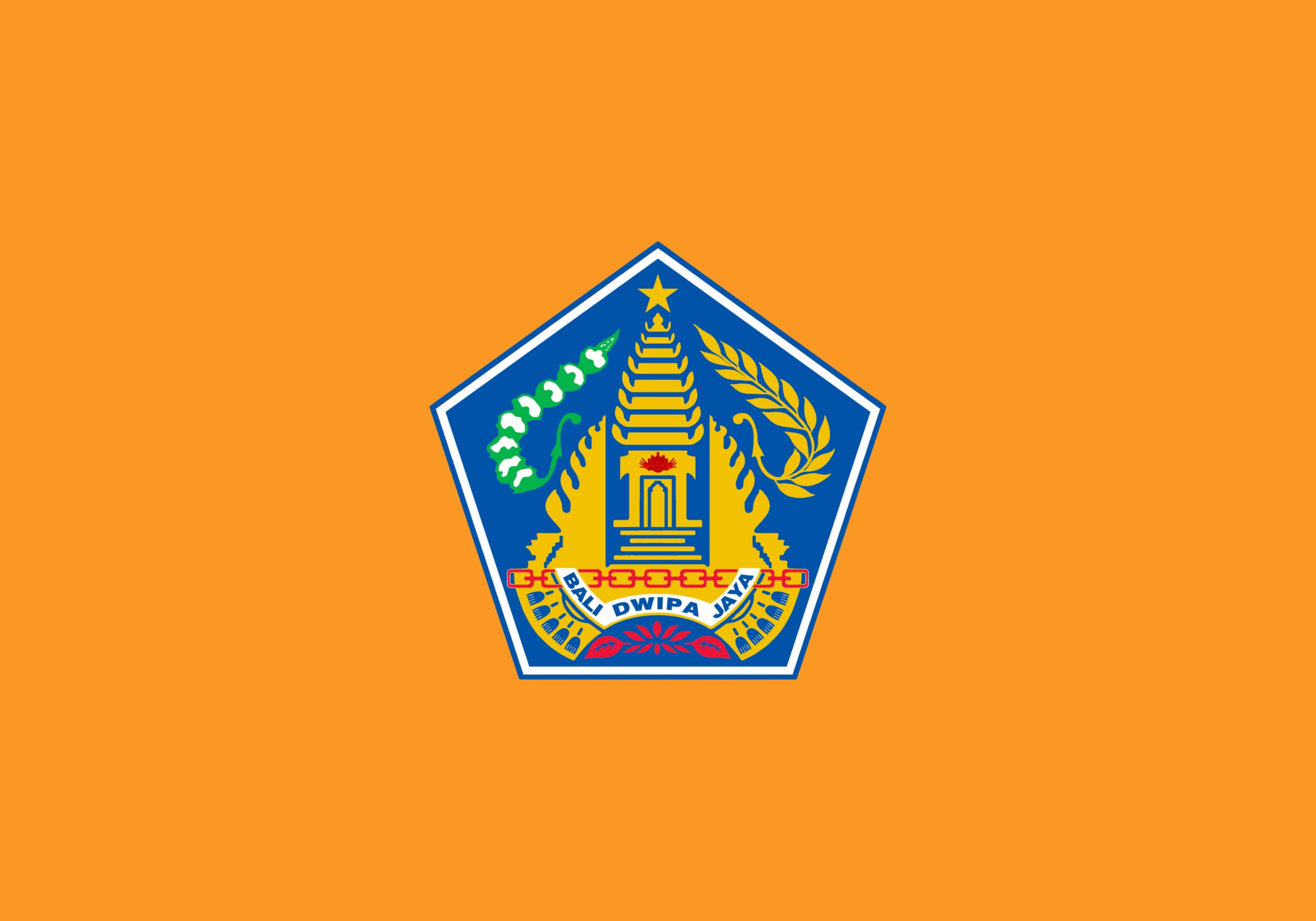
| ← 2003 | 9 July 2008 | 2013 → |
- Registered: 2,013,151
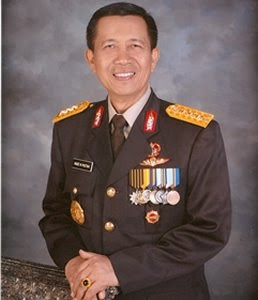

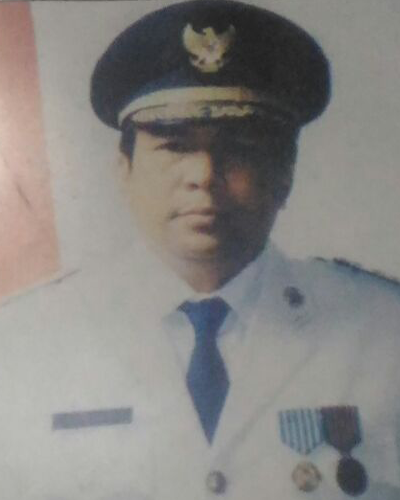

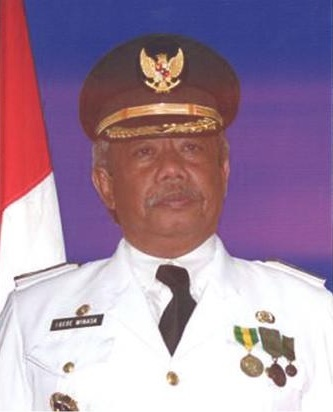
| Nominee | I Made Mangku Pastika | Tjokorda Gde Budi Suryawan | I Gede Winasa |
| Party | PDI-P | Golkar | Democratic |
| Alliance | | Bali People's Coalition | Bali Awakening Coalition |
| Running mate | A.A.G. Ngurah Puspayoga | Njoman Gede Suweta | I Gusti Bagus Alit Putra |
| Popular vote | 1,037,918 | 527,861 | 360,724 |
| Percentage | 55.04% | 26.71% | 18.25% |
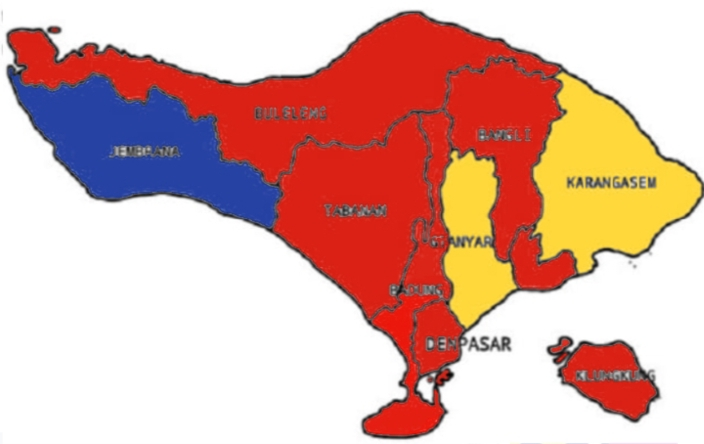
- Results by city/regency Pastika Suryawan Winasa
Governor before election
Dewa Made Beratha
PDI-P
Elected Governor
I Made Mangku Pastika
PDI-P

The 2008 Bali gubernatorial election was a regional head election in Indonesia held on 9 July 2008 to elect the governor and vice governor of Bali for the five-year term (2008–2013). The 2008 Bali gubernatorial election was the first time in Bali's history where candidate for the governor and vice governor were directly elected by the people by vote. Candidate I Made Mangku Pastika of the Indonesian Democratic Party of Struggle (PDI-P) won this election defeating two other candidates, namely Tjokorda Gde Budi Suryawan of the Golkar Party and I Gede Winasa of the Democratic Party.

There were three at once candidate pairs competing in this election. I Made Mangku Pastika a retired police officer won on this election.

== Description ==
There are three pairs of candidates competing in this general election, namely Candidate number 1 I Gede Winasa and I Gusti Bagus Alit Putra supported by the Democratic party and the Bali Awakening Coalition (Koalisi Kebangkitan Bali); Candidate number 2 is Tjokorda Gde Budi Suryawan and Njoman Gede Suweta was supported by the Golkar Party (Golkar) and the Bali People's Coalition (Koalisi Rakyat Bali); and I Made Mangku Pastika and A. A. G. N. Puspayoga who was supported by Indonesian Democratic Party of Struggle (PDI-P). This general election was finally won by candidate Pastika-Puspayoga after the decision of the plenary meeting at the Bali Provincial KPU on July 16, 2008 and was inaugurated on August 28, 2008, in a special session of the Bali Regional House of Representatives in Denpasar City.

This election was held on July 9, 2008

== Candidates ==
This Bali Gubernatorial Election followed by three candidate pairs for governor and deputy governor. Candidate for Governor number 1, I Gede Winasa is running in a pair with IGB Alit Putra. Candidate for Governor number 2, Tjokorda Gde Budi Suryawan is running in a pair with Njoman Gde Suweta. Candidate for Governor number 3, I Made Mangku Pastika running in tandem with Anak Agung Gede Ngurah Puspayoga.

| Order No. | Candidates for Governor and Vice Governor | | Parties (Note: Including parliamentary and non-parliamentary parties) | DPRD seats |
|---|---|---|---|---|
| 1 | | | Democratic; PKS; PNBK; PKPI; Pioneer'; PKB; PPDI; PDS; Merdeka; PDK; Union; Labour | 4 / 55 |
| 1 | I Gede Winasa | I Gusti Bagus Alit Putra | Democratic; PKS; PNBK; PKPI; Pioneer'; PKB; PPDI; PDS; Merdeka; PDK; Union; Labour | 4 / 55 |
| 1 | Regent of Jembrana (2000–2010) | Regent of Badung (1990–1999); Vice Governor of Bali (1998–2003) | Democratic; PKS; PNBK; PKPI; Pioneer'; PKB; PPDI; PDS; Merdeka; PDK; Union; Labour | 4 / 55 |
| 2 | | | Golkar PNIM; PPP; PPIB; PKPB | 21 / 55 |
| 2 | Tjokorda Gde Budi Suryawan | Njoman Gede Suweta | Golkar PNIM; PPP; PPIB; PKPB | 21 / 55 |
| 2 | Regent of Gianyar (1993–2003) | Retired National Police Officer (1974–2008) | Golkar PNIM; PPP; PPIB; PKPB | 21 / 55 |
| 3 | | | PDI-P | 30 / 55 |
| 3 | I Made Mangku Pastika | Anak Agung Gede Ngurah Puspayoga | PDI-P | 30 / 55 |
| 3 | Retired National Police Officer (1974–2008) | Mayor of Denpasar (1999–2008) | PDI-P | 30 / 55 |

== Election results ==
Bali Gubernatorial Election Results 2008
| Candidate Pairs | Parties | Voter Votes | % |
|---|---|---|---|
| Winasa-Putra | Democratic Party | 360,724 | 18,25% |
| Surya-Suweta | Golkar Party | 527,861 | 26,71% |
| Pastika-Yoga | Indonesian Democratic Party Struggle | 1,037,918 | 55.04% |
| Valid Votes | | 1,976,495 | |
| Invalid Votes | | 35,178 | |
| Source | | | |

=== Vote Acquisition per Regency/City ===
Vote Results per Regency/City
| Region | Winasa-Putra | Surya-Suweta | Pastika-Puspayoga | Valid votes | Invalid votes | Total |
|---|---|---|---|---|---|---|
| Denpasar City | 58,174 | 54,720 | 143,403 | 256,297 | 3,973 | 260,270 |
| Badung Regency | 42,743 | 73,334 | 113,050 | 229,127 | 4,237 | 233,364 |
| Tabanan Regency | 40,297 | 42,146 | 211,977 | 294,420 | 4,219 | 298,639 |
| Jembrana Regency | 111,670 | 15,286 | 25,261 | 152,217 | 1,255 | 153,472 |
| Buleleng Regency | 37,610 | 40,467 | 243,205 | 321,282 | 3,814 | 325,096 |
| Bangli Regency | 11,772 | 32,239 | 96,726 | 140,737 | 2,303 | 143,040 |
| Karangasem Regency | 32,689 | 95,853 | 91,785 | 220,327 | 5,381 | 225,708 |
| Klungkung Regency | 14,355 | 29,567 | 50,902 | 94,824 | 3,334 | 98,158 |
| Gianyar Regency | 19,409 | 144,249 | 105,588 | 269,246 | 6,159 | 275,405 |
| Total | 368,719 | 527,861 | 1,081,897 | 1,978,477 | 34,675 | 2,013,151 |
