= 2013 Bali gubernatorial election =

Local election in Indonesia

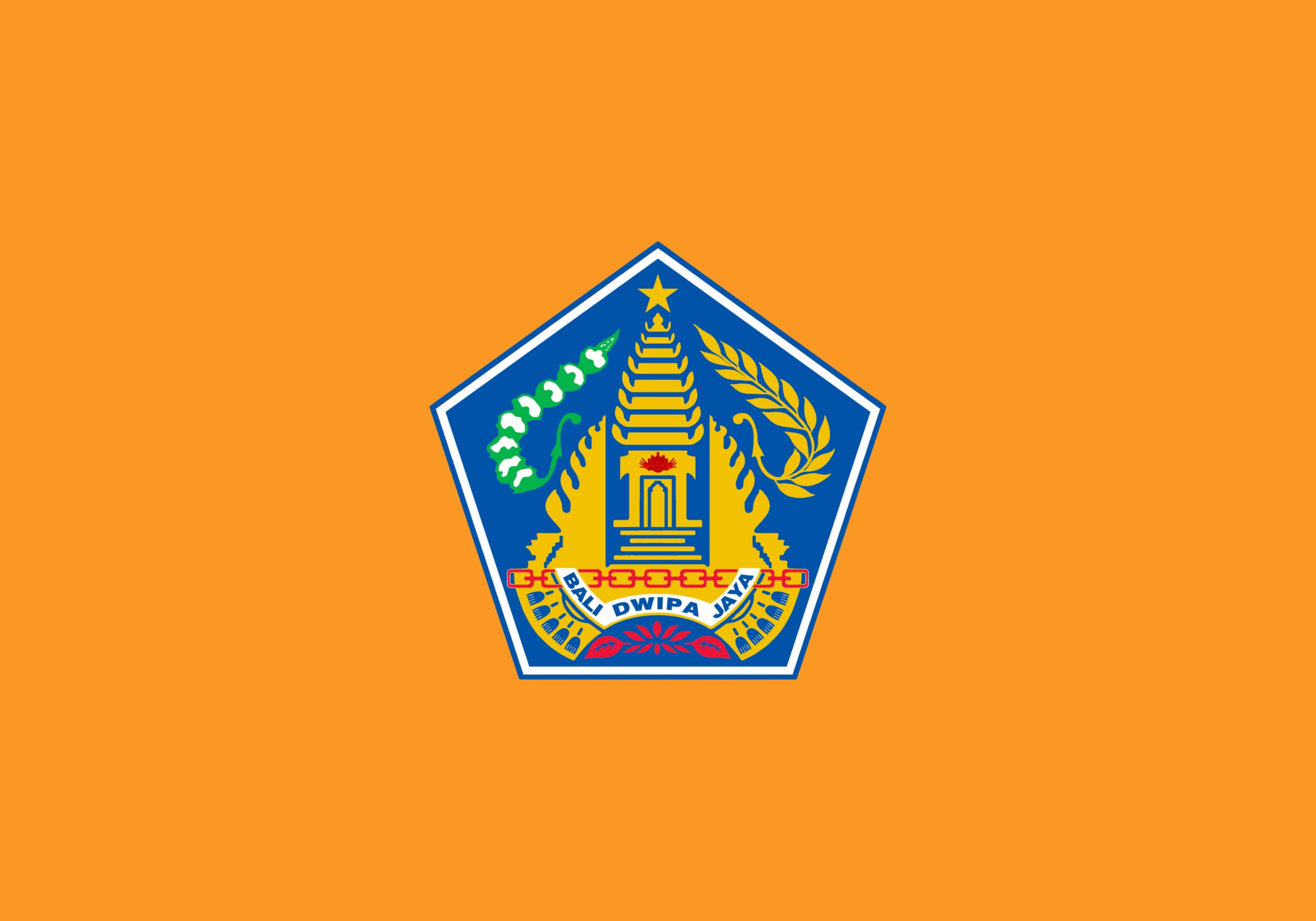
- 15 May 2013
- Registered: 2,918,824
- Turnout: 71.02%
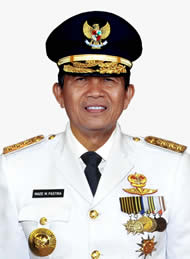

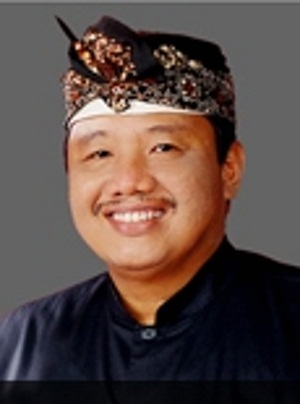
Candidate	I Made Mangku Pastika	A.A.G. Ngurah Puspayoga
Party	Democratic	PDI-P
Alliance	Bali Mandara Coalition
Running mate	I Ketut Sudikerta	Dewa Nyoman Sukrawan
Popular vote	1,063,734	1,062,738
Percentage	50.02%	49.98%
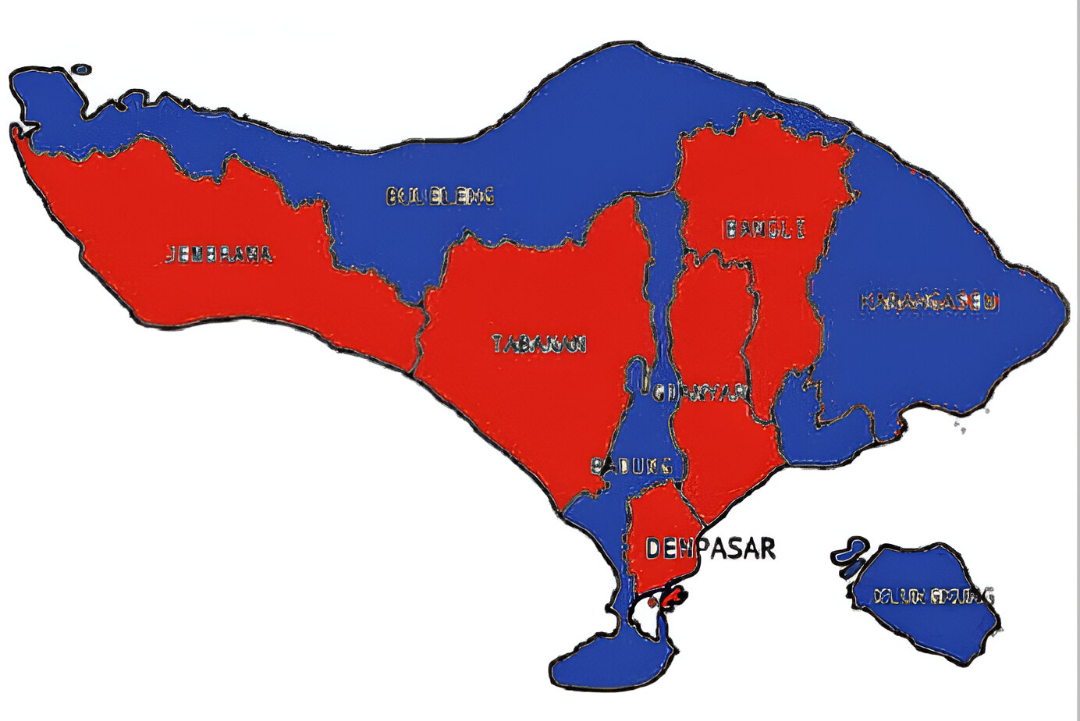
- Results by city/regency Pastika Puspayoga
Governor before election
I Made Mangku Pastika
Democratic
Elected Governor
I Made Mangku Pastika
Democratic

The 2013 Bali gubernatorial election was a regional head election in Indonesia held on May 15 2013 to elect the governor and vice governor of Bali for the five-year term (2013–2018). Incumbent governor I Made Mangku Pastika of the Democratic Party won this election defeating Anak Agung Gede Ngurah Puspayoga of the Indonesian Democratic Party of Struggle (PDI-P).

== Description ==
There were two candidate pairs competing in this election, namely Anak Agung Gede Ngurah Puspayoga (former Mayor of Denpasar and Vice Governor of Bali) and Dewa Nyoman Sukrawan who was supported by the Indonesian Democratic Party of Struggle (PDI-P). And I Made Mangku Pastika (previous Governor of Bali) and I Ketut Sudikerta who were supported by the Democratic Party. This general election was finally won by the Pastika-Kerta pair with a vote acquisition of 1,062,738 or 50.02% while the Puspayoga-Sukrawan pair received 1,063,734 votes or 49.98%. This result was then validated after the decision of the Bali Provincial General Elections Commission (KPU) on May 26, 2013.

== Candidates ==
Order No.	Gubernatorial candidate	Vice Gubernatorial candidate	Parties (Note: Including parliamentary and non-parliamentary parties)	DPRD seats	Ref.
1	Anak Agung Gede Ngurah Puspayoga		PDI-P; PNIM; PKS; NasDem	25 / 55	
2	I Made Mangku Pastika	I Ketut Sudikerta	Democratic; Golkar; PAN; Gerindra; Hanura; PKPI; PKPB; PNBK; PKP	29 / 55	

In the seconds leading up to the closing of registration for candidates for Governor and Deputy Governor of Bali, the former Regent of Jembrana, namely I Gede Winasa and a businessman I Putu Sudiartana suddenly appeared and registered as prospective candidates for Governor and Deputy Governor of Bali at the KPU office Bali Province at 15.00 WITA before closing. The Winasa-Sudiartana pair was supported by 28 political parties with 338,479 votes or 18.27%. However, this pair failed to register as candidates for Governor and Deputy Governor of Bali because they failed to complete the files by the time specified by the KPU.

== Election results ==
Candidate	Party	Vote	%
Puspa-Sukrawan	PDI-P	1,062,738	49.98%
Pastika-Sudikerta	Democratic	1,063,734	50.02%
Invalid/Golput		792,352	
Total		2,159,234	100%
Registered voters		2,918,824	
