= Cok Budi Suryawan =

Indonesian civil servant and politician (1952–2023)

Tjokorda Gde Budi Suryawan
- ᬢ᭄ᬚᭀᬓᭀᬃᬤᬕ᭄ᬤᬾᬩᬸᬤᬶᬲᬸᬃᬬᬯᬦ᭄
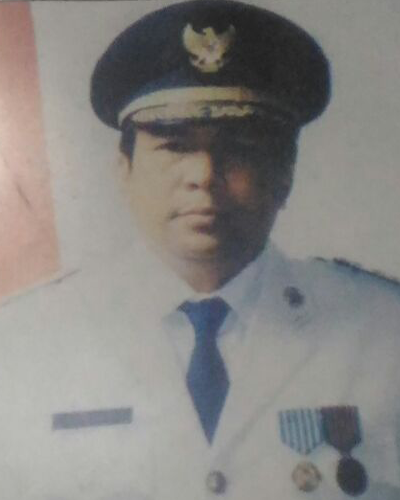

8th Regent of Gianyar
- In office February 1993 – 2003
- Governor: Ida Bagus Oka; Dewa Made Beratha
- Preceded by: Tjokorda Raka Dherana
- Succeeded by: A.A.G. Agung Bharata

Member of the Bali Regional House of Representatives
- In office 30 August 2004 – 1 September 2014
- Constituency: Bali IX

Personal details
- Born: Tjokorda Gede Budi Suryawan; 13 September 1952 Ubud, Gianyar, Bali, Indonesia
- Died: 27 June 2023 (aged 70) Ubud, Gianyar, Bali, Indonesia
- Party: Golkar
- Other political affiliations: PNI-MM
- Spouse: Tjokorda Istri Putra Anitawati (m. 1979)
- Children: 3
- Parents: Tjokorda Gede Putra (father); Anak Agung Istri Putra Asmari (mother)

Tjokorda Gde Budi Suryawan (Balinese: ᬢ᭄ᬚᭀᬓᭀᬃᬤᬕ᭄ᬤᬾᬩᬸᬤᬶᬲᬸᬃᬬᬯᬦ᭄; 13 September 1952 – 27 June 2023), known as Cok Budi Suryawan was an Indonesian civil servant and politician who served as the 6th Regent of Gianyar from 1993 until 2003 and a member of the Bali Regional House of Representatives (DPRD) from 2009 until 2014.

== Early life and education ==
Suryawan was born in Ubud on 13 September 1952, to parents Tjokorda Gede Putra and Anak Agung Istri Putra Asmari. Both of his parents were aristocrats from the Ubud Puri. He began his primary education in Ubud and completed it in 1965. He then continued his education in Denpasar until he graduated from high school in 1971. Suryawan then studied law at the Udayan University and received a law degree in 1978. During his career, he pursued postgraduate studies at Darul Ulun University in Jakarta. He also attended courses held by the State Administrative Agency and the National Resilience Institute in 2001.

== Career ==
Suryawan began his career as an employee of the Bali provincial secretariat from 1979 to 1980. During his career in the provincial secretariat, CBS also served as the personal secretary to Governor Ida Bagus Mantra. He ended his career as the chief of protocol at the provincial secretariat in 1993.

Suryawan was nominated as the Regent of Gianyar in January 1993. He was elected in an internal election held by the Bali Regional People's Representative Council and was installed as regent at the end of February. He was re-elected in 1997 and served until 2002. During his tenure, Suryawan built hundreds of statues inspired by the Balinese folklore Pemutaran Mandara Giri. He also initiated the construction of the Gianyar Hall of Culture, Kebo Iwa Sports Hall, and Kapten Dipta Stadium, which became the home stadium of Bali United F.C.

After the end of his term, Suryawan ran for Governor of Bali. He was supported by the Indonesian Unity fraction inside Bali's Regional People's Representative Council. Despite receiving approval from the Home Affairs Department, he was not selected to compete in the final election process. The Indonesian Unity fraction later shifted their support to another candidate.

Suryawan was nominated for Bali's Regional People's Representative Council after failing to compete in the gubernatorial election. He was elected in 2004 and 2009, serving two full terms in the council. He represented Gianyar and was seated in Commission I of the council, which handles legal and governance affairs.

During this period, Suryawan became the regional chairman of Bali's Golkar in December 2004 and served until early 2010. Under his leadership, Golkar won local elections in Bali, such as in Badung, Karangasem, and Gianyar. In 2008, Suryawan ran again for the governorship in 2008 with support from the Golkar party. He lost the election to former Bali police chief I Made Mangku Pastika.

Despite failing to obtain a seat in Bali's Regional People's Representative Council in the 2014 Indonesian legislative election, Suryawan was called to replace MP Tjokorda Raka Kerthyasa, who resigned to run in local elections. However, Suryawan refused to replace Kerthayasa, citing age as his reason.

== Personal life ==
Suryawan was married to Tjokorda Istri Putra Anitawati in 1979. The couple had three children.

In 2016, Suryawan was diagnosed with Parkinson's disease. He died on the morning of 27 June 2023, at his residence in Ubud, Gianyar. He was 70.
