= Bali Nusra Tangi =

The country of Indonesia consists of more than 17,000 islands and hundreds of different cultures. Each region has its own traditional costume. One of the unique traditional costumes worn in Bali, East Nusa Tenggara (NTT) and the West Nusa Tenggara (NTB) islands located in the eastern region of Indonesia. The three areas were once a single province known as a Lesser Sunda (Bali, East and West Nusa Tenggara). Bali Nusra is a short form of Bali Nusa Tenggara Islands or Lesser Sunda Islands. And Tangi is a place in NTT.

== Indonesia cultural Wealth ==
Traditional cultural wealth is a point of strength whereby people can improve their livelihoods, thus undoubtfully its preservation efforts must be supported. "Several efforts in preserving these things are presented through various exhibitions of local products such as tenun weaving, typical traditional culinary, and assortments of handicrafts from Bali, NTB and NTT," stated the Commander of Regional Military IX/Udayana Bali NTT NTB, Major General TNI Hotmangaradja Pandjaitan, moments after the pre-event opening. Bali Nusa Tenggara Tangi 2009 traditional cloth exhibition is a result of this idea, a fashion event based on traditional cloth such as the tenun that is woven in Bali, NTB, and NTT, in cooperation with the Indonesian Ministry of Culture and Tourism, the Yayasan Cita Abdi Bangsa Foundation, and Rumah Pesona Kain.

== Tangi (Rise) ==
Tangi, which means 'to rise', became the underlying theme of the Bali and Nusa Tenggara collective event. According to Pandjaitan, many local cultural products deserve to be presented to the international stage. The process of creating the crafts by hand with natural materials is something that deserves high regard. A number of programs enhancing the local cultural products of the three provinces included tenun ikat (weaving) competitions, handicraft exhibitions, and traditional culinary presentations from the three provinces, as well as presentations from the aforementioned national fashion designers. Furthermore, worth praising were the displays of the various traditional handicrafts together with souvenirs, jewelry and interior décor that continues to win the favor of national and international markets. Also presented were the manual processes of traditional natural dyeing demonstrated by a West Nusa Tenggara local.

== Tenun (weaving) traditional cloth ==
Various tenun woven cloths from the three provinces were presented in a gallery layout where guests could examine the dazzling colors and motifs used throughout. A length of traditional Indonesian tenun is fully laden with traditional, sociological, artistic, and historical value, and tells of the developmental and enriching process of a certain community. As stated by Mrs. Tuti Pandjaitan, the head of the Kartika Chandra Kirana Regional Military Command IX/Udayana Association of Army Wives, "On a piece of tenun cloth, one may find the dedication and resilience of the hands of crafters who create it. The artistic superiority of this traditional cloth presents a long journey in a diverse, rich and meaningful tradition." The tenun is an heirloom, and its weaving processes will never change by replacing it with machinery. To weave a length of tenun requires a month or more to finalize.

Prior there were held competitions and workshops on tenun in Bali, NTB, and NTT. The judges were experts in the field of traditional tenun. "The purpose was to increase the quality and enrich the present materials and traditional designs in order to improve the people's welfare," added Tuti Pandjaitan.

Also present was Bali's Governor Made Mangku Pastika and NTT's Governor Frans Lebu Raya. The Governor of NTB welcomed the idea from the Regional Military Command IX/Udayana and hoped that it would continue to present other cultural forms, such as performing arts. The next possibility is an exhibition or similar event in the two other provinces, such as in Mataram (NTB) and Kupang (NTT). "This is giving momentum to elevate the nation's opus," he said.

== TNI Role in the traditional Cloth Exhibition ==
Meanwhile, Hotmangardja Pandjaitan explained that the role of the TNI was most importantly to unite the cultural diversity of the archipelago. The TNI also feels responsible for keeping the territorial integrity of the nation, not only during wartimes but also through times of peace. The event held by Regional Military Command IX/Udayana together with the Department of Culture and Tourism aims to uphold national integrity. The event was also made possible due to the active role of the Army Wives' Association - Persatuan Istri Prajurit (Persit) Kartika Chandra Korem 161 Kupang, Korem 162 Mataram, and Korem 163 Bali. Several fashion designs were also presented by the soldiers and wives who paraded onto the catwalk that night.
