= Governor of Bali =

Head of government of the Indonesian province of Bali

- Gubernur Bali
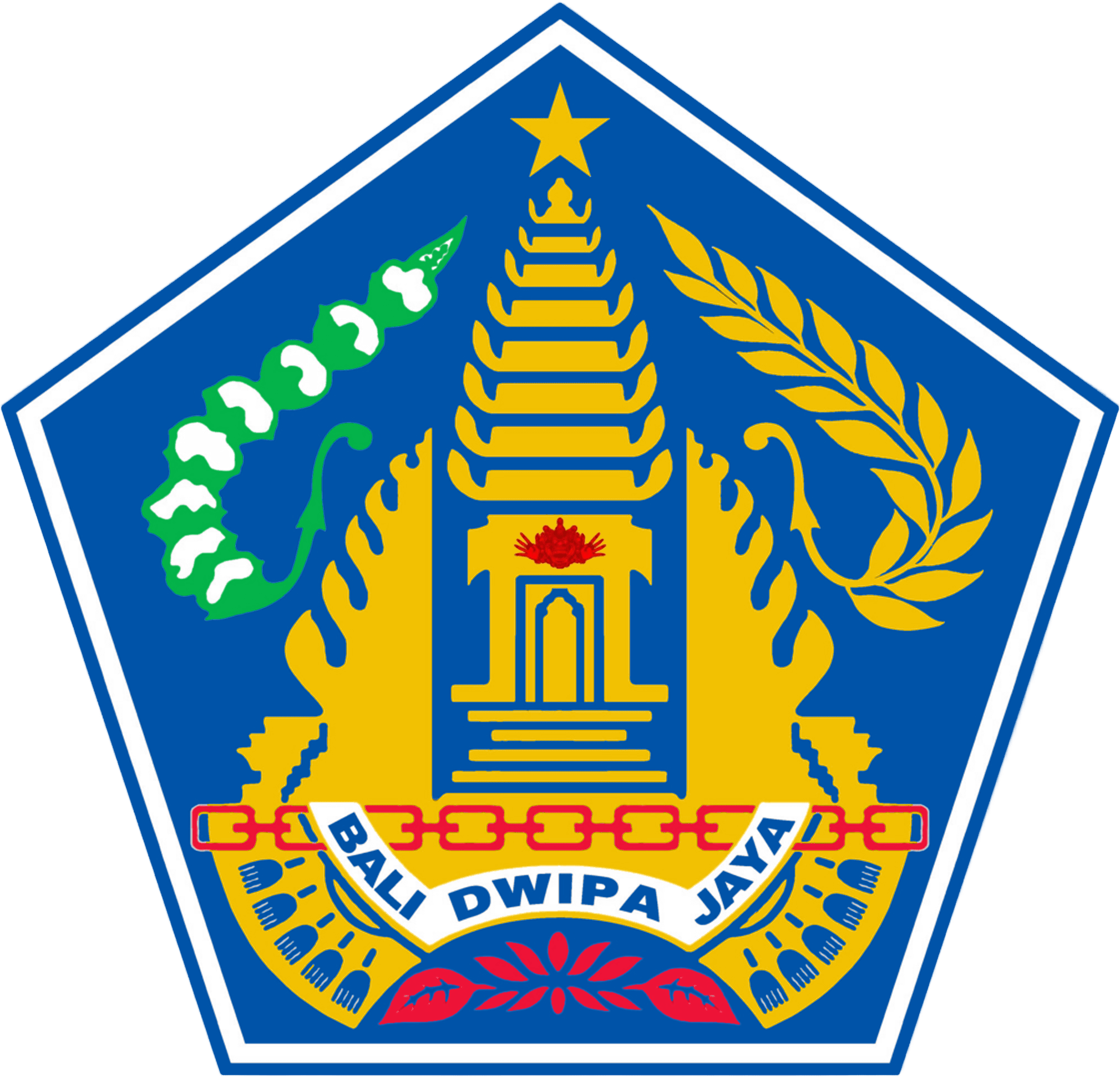
- Coat of arms of Bali

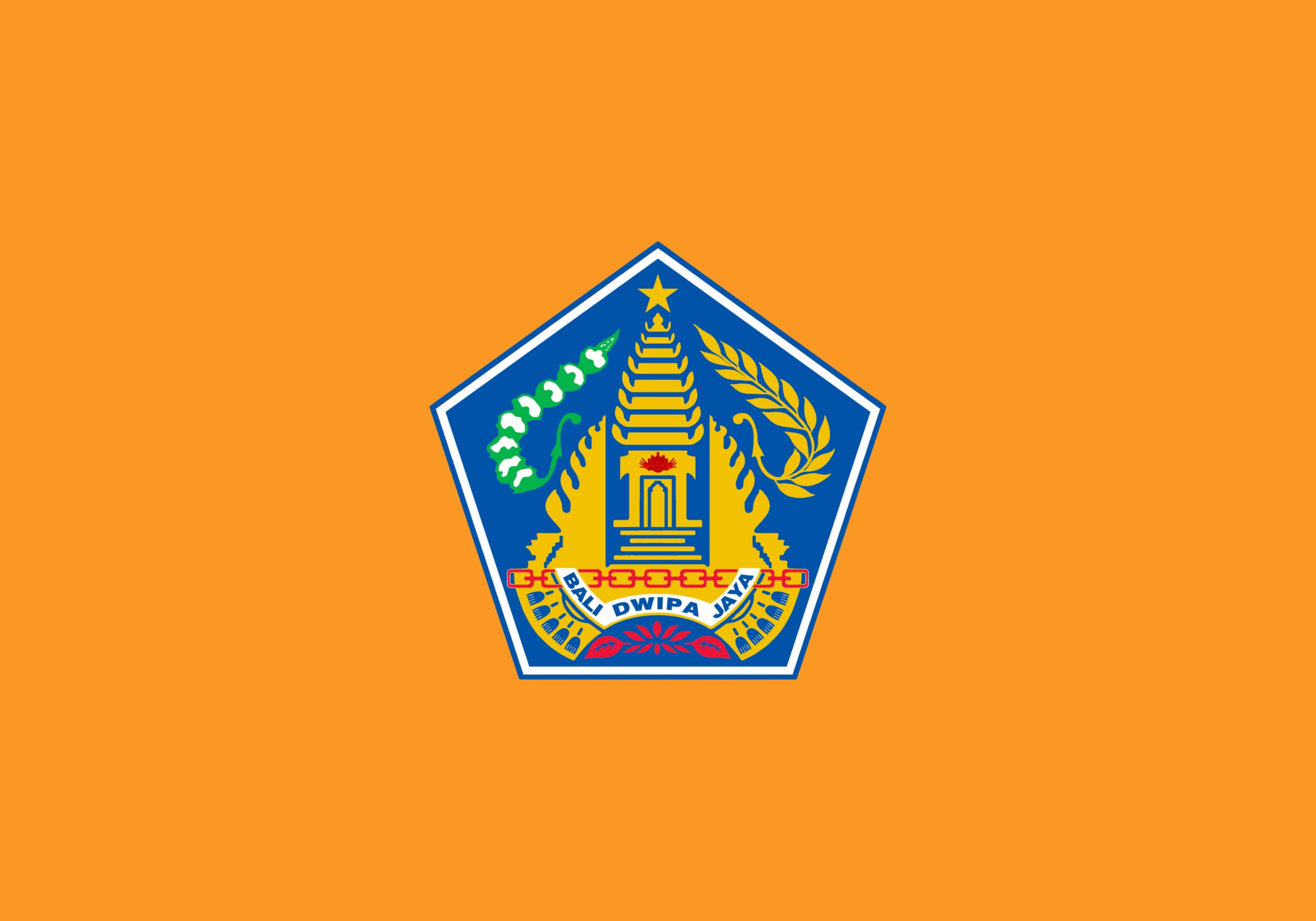
- Flag of Bali (non-civil)

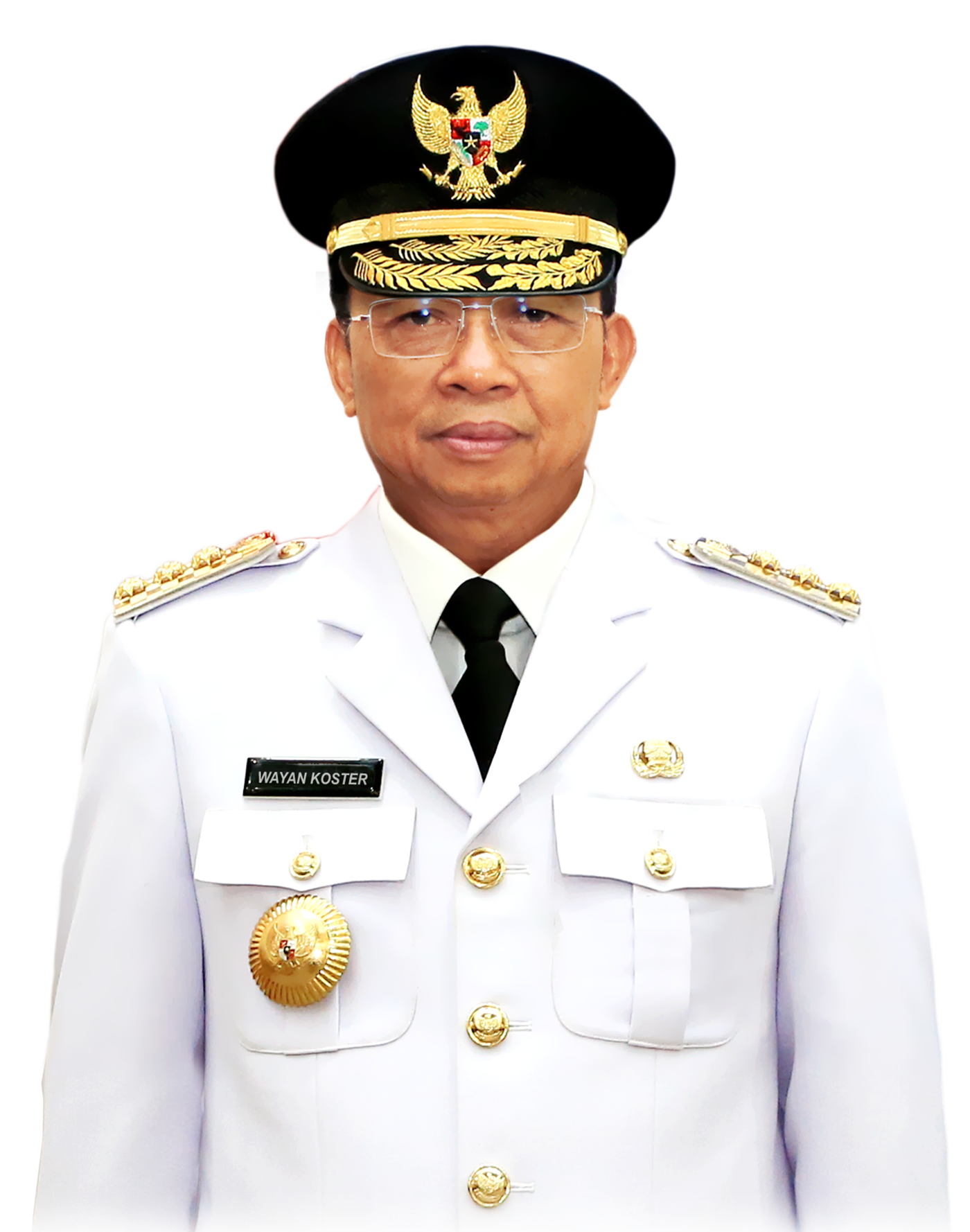
- Incumbent; I Wayan Koster since 20 February 2025
- Bali Provincial Government
- Style: Mr. Governor (informal); The Honorable (formal); His Excellency (international correspondence/diplomatic)
- Type: Chief executive
- Status: Head of government
- Abbreviation: GOB (in English); Gub. Bali (in Indonesian)
- Residence: Jaya Sabha Complex
- Seat: Denpasar
- Nominator: Political parties
- Appointer: Direct popular elections within Bali or President Members of the Bali Regional House of Representatives (formerly)
- Term length: Five years, renewable once 1 year (specifically for the acting governor)
- Precursor: Governor of Lesser Sunda; Governor of Nusa Tenggara; Resident of Bali
- Formation: 14 August 1959; 67 years ago
- First holder: Anak Agung Bagus Sutedja
- Deputy: Vice Governor of Bali
- Salary: Rp3 million (US$179,47) per month
- Website: Short profile of governor and vice governor of Bali (in Indonesian)

The Governor of Bali (Indonesian: Gubernur Bali) is the head of the first-level administration of the Bali provincial government, and governs the province alongside the vice governor and the 55 members of the Bali Regional House of Representatives (DPRD). The governor and vice governor are elected in general elections held every five years. The current governor of Bali is I Wayan Koster.

== History ==
On 14 August 1958, the Province of Bali was established. It had previously been a residency within the Province of the Lesser Sunda Islands (Nusa Tenggara), and was made an autonomous province within Indonesia. The Province of Bali has been led by a succession of leaders who have transformed the socio‑economic and cultural conditions of the Balinese people. At least eight governors and three acting governors have served the province, coming from various backgrounds, including bureaucrats (non‑party civil servants), military officers and politicians.

=== Anak Agung Bagus Sutedja ===
Anak Agung Bagus Suteja (August 14, 1959-1966) was the first governor to lead Bali. He was previously the regional head of Bali when it was still a residency of the Nusa Tenggara Islands province. Bagus Sutedja began his career when the Balinese government experienced a political system transition from an autocratic-regency kingdom system to an integrated government of the Republic of Indonesia. In 1958, when Bali became a separate province, and the People's Representative Council-Gotong Royong national legislature (DPR-GR) was formed. The DPR-GR functions elected the regional head (Governor) of Bali, which changed the political map of Bali. At that time there were two camps of the Indonesian National Party (PNI) competing to nominate a governor, namely the Anak Agung Bagus Sutedja camp and the I Nyoman Mantik camp. However, Sukarno and the PNI elite chose Bagus Sutedja because of his political closeness and Bagus Sutedja's experience in managing the Bali region when it was a residency. Bagus Sutedja was inaugurated by President Sukarno on August 14, 1959.

The major problem faced by Bali during the era of Governor Bagus Sutedja was the aftermath of the G30S 1965 military coup attempt and the heating up of tensions between the PNI political elite between the Anak Agung Bagus Sutedja camp and the I Nyoman Mantik and Wedastera Suyasa camp. This political conflict and polarization gave birth to the dark event of the Human Rights tragedy (HAM) of the mass slaughter of Balinese people in 1965-1966, where the people and PNI political elites of the Sukarnoist elements in the Sutedja camp were killed, people suspected of being affiliated with the Indonesian Communist Party (PKI) were killed and artists and critics of the government were punished without trial. After the G30S, Sutedja was officially invited by Chairul Saleh as the Chairman of the MPRS to Bandung and President Sukarno to Jakarta in December 1965, and lived temporarily in Jakarta with his family, but after July 29, 1966, he was picked up by the military and his fate is unknown and his body was found. This major problem has changed the social and cultural patterns of Balinese society, which used to be characterized by demonstrations, parades, and critical demonstrations against the government, to a state of calm and harmony towards the government.

=== I Gusti Putu Martha and Soekarmen ===
I Gusti Putu Martha (1966-1967) was the second governor of Bali Province who came from the National Party. He replaced Bagus Sutedja whose whereabouts are unknown. Soekarmen (1967-27 August 1978) was the third governor of Bali Province who came from the military group. He led Bali for two terms, namely from 1967-1971 and 1971-1978, and was the first non-Hindu (Muslim) Governor of Bali. Until now the author has not obtained data on the policies made by Governors Putu Martha and Soekarmen. There are book notes from Prof. Henk Schulte Nordholt, a socio-political scientist who tells that around 1970, the Bali Provincial Government designed a master plan that focused mass tourism on the southern tip of Bali, in the Nusa Dua area, Badung Regency (Nordholt, 2007). However, this became the envy of other regencies, so that Soekarmen's replacement, namely Governor Ida Bagus Mantra, then opened nine additional tourist areas, followed by Governor Ida Bagus Oka who added fifteen tourist areas in 1988 and six more tourist areas in 1993, with a total tourist area that was a quarter of the island of Bali (Nordholt, 2007)..

=== Ida Bagus Mantra ===
Ida Bagus Mantra (August 27, 1978-August 27, 1983) was the fourth governor of Bali Province from Golkar Party who serving during the New Order government of Soeharto, he had a vision and mission of policies that Balinese culture derived from Hindu values as the basis for the development of Bali Province. The legacy of his policies resulted in a program known as the Bali Arts Festival (PKB) which was first held (June 20, 1979-August 23, 1979). The construction of offices and buildings in Bali is inseparable from the policy that buildings must implement the local wisdom of Tri Hita Karana and be arranged with Balinese architectural nuances. The term we know that office buildings, hotels, and other buildings must not exceed the height of a coconut tree from the legacy of his policies. Ida Bagus Mantra also made a policy, namely Regional Regulation (Perda) Number 6 of 1986 concerning the Position, Function, and Role of Traditional Villages, until now the traditional villages/pakraman have become traditional government institutions that regulate spirituality and culture to conceptualize Tri Hita Karana in the lives of Balinese people. The Perda also contains the presence of the Village Credit Institution (LPD) in Bali, namely a savings and loan business entity owned by traditional villages, which is useful for the economic development of traditional village communities and a source of original income for traditional villages in Bali Province.

=== Ida Bagus Oka ===
Ida Bagus Oka (August 27, 1993-May 23, 1998) was the fifth governor of Bali Province from the Golkar party serving during and post-New Order government of Soeharto, he was part of the ministers in President B.J. Habibie's reform cabinet. Ida Bagus Oka was a controversial governor during his time because he was known to be cooperative with foreign investors and the New Order government, related to the tourist economy in Bali so that he was given the nickname "Ida Bagus OK". In the Ida Bagus Oka Era, he added fifteen tourist areas in 1988 and six more tourist areas in 1993, with a total tourist area of a quarter of the island of Bali, resulting in a massive surge in touristification of the tourism industry economy (Nordholt, 2007). Touristification is a process in which a place changes due to becoming an object of tourist consumption, sometimes it can have negative implications for tourist attractions because it has received informal and formal opposition from the environment and surrounding community.

One of them is that he gave permission to build the Bali Nirwana Resort in Tabanan (its location is close to the sacred location of Tanah Lot Temple). The controversy over the environmental impact analysis of the resort development sparked a protest movement across the island of Bali, from academics, students, NGO activists, the local newspaper Bali Post, and representatives of the opposition party PDI. The protest movement was finally stopped when there was intervention from President Soeharto and Le Meridien Nirwana Golf and Spa Resort began advertising its soft-opening in 1997 (Nordholt, 2003). In addition to the Tanah Lot case, there was also the case of the construction of a large resort on Padanggalak Beach, Kesiman Village, Sanur in 1997, which received resistance from the community because the beach was a religious site for Denpasar residents to perform melasti ceremonies and post-cremation purification. In late November 1997, Governor Oka declared that all development activities on Padanggalak Beach were cancelled, so that the incident became history that middle-class protests and village-based resistance were strong enough to defeat a coalition between foreign investors and local officials.

=== Dewa Made Beratha ===
Dewa Made Beratha (August 27, 1998-August 28, 2008) was the sixth governor of Bali Province who served two terms, namely 1998-2003 and 2003-2008. During his administration, negative sentiment emerged from Balinese scholars and Hindu figures regarding the presence of many Muslim immigrants and people from Eastern Indonesia. Therefore, in January 2003, he and the regents/mayors made an agreement to issue a uniform policy on levies for non-Balinese people to pay Rp. 200,000 per year for their residence permits, and migrants from other places in Bali were charged Rp. 20,000.00 per year (Nordholt, 2003). This levy policy has become one of his legacies to this day. In his era, Bali Provincial Regulation Number 3 of 2001 concerning the Role of Customary Villages was born, which gave full authority (autonomy) to the pakraman village (village that has the power to regulate customs) to run its internal affairs, and formulated the law on the presence of pecalang as a traditional security task force, especially those related to customary and religious activities (Nordholt, 2007). The special autonomy of the pakraman village gave the pakraman village the right to village land that could not be sold or taxed by the government, and opened up opportunities for the pakraman village to provide credit, open local businesses, and demand money from surrounding hotels for the original village views enjoyed by hotel guests.

Dewa Made Beratha also played an important role in supporting the local media Bali Post (Bali Post Media Group / KMBP) which was led by Satria Naradha. Satria Naradha was the person who launched the concept of Ajeg Bali, a concept about the discourse on preserving Balinese culture. Ajeg Bali was introduced at the inauguration of Bali TV (a television channel from KMBP), when Dewa Made Beratha encouraged television viewers to stabilize Balinese customs and culture (Nordholt, 2007). The concept of Ajeg Bali brought by Bali TV includes news presenters and reporters delivering the opening greeting Om Swastyastu and closing Om Santhi Santhi Santhi Om, broadcasting Hindu prayers (Puja Trisandya) at 6 am, 12 noon, 6 pm by imitating the Islamic format and Christian prayer style, and the talk show Dharma Wacana (Nordholt, 2007). The legacy of the concept of broadcasting the Puja Trisandya prayer still exists today both on local and national television broadcasts. The politics and campaign of Ajeg Bali which is related to the Bali Post as a local media, made Dewa Made Beratha re-elected as Governor of Bali in August 2003 (Nordholt, 2007)..

=== I Made Mangku Pastika ===
I Made Mangku Pastika (28 August 2008 – 29 August 2018) was the seventh governor of Bali Province, serving two terms (2008–2013 and 2013–2018). He came from a background as a retired police officer and politician.

Mangku Pastika's most remembered policy in the field of public health is the Bali Mandara Health Insurance (JKBM) programme, as stipulated in the Bali Governor's Regulation (Pergub) Number 6 of 2010. The JKBM policy was born out of the need to guarantee health insurance for the Balinese people through joint efforts of the provincial and district/city governments. Previously, each district had its own health insurance programme – examples include the Jembrana Health Insurance (JKJ) and Askes Mandiri Tabanan (Januraga, 2010). JKBM functions to provide fair health services for the people of Bali, with its financing subsidised by the provincial government and by those districts and cities that did not already have other health insurance (Januraga, 2010).

In the education sector, Mangku Pastika introduced a policy whereby the Bali Provincial Government, in collaboration with the Putera Sampoerna Foundation, established the Bali Mandara State Senior High School (SMA Negeri) in 2011. This school was legitimised by Bali Governor's Decree (SK) No. 680/03-A/HK/2011. SMA Negeri Bali Mandara is a public school for underprivileged Balinese students, with the provincial government covering all costs (education, food, clothing and other necessities) at no charge to the students. In addition to the construction of SMAN Bali Mandara, the Bali Mandara State Vocational High School (SMKN) was also established in 2013 and began operating in July 2015. This education policy had a significant impact on Bali's younger generation at the time, enabling those with financial difficulties to continue their secondary education. Alumni of SMAN/SMKN Bali Mandara have also gone on to government schools and state and private universities, where they receive scholarships and have their tuition fees covered.

=== I Wayan Koster ===
I Wayan Koster (September 5, 2018–September 5, 2023, February 20, 2025–present) is the eighth current governor of Bali Province. He was a prominent figure in the Hindu community, specifically the Indonesian Hindu Youth Association and Prajaniti Hindu Indonesia. Prior to becoming governor, he served as a member of the Indonesian House of Representatives (DPR-RI) from 2004 to 2018. Many of his regulations were titled "preserving customs and culture," such as the provision on Balinese Traditional Villages, which was included in the Village Law (Law Number 6 of 2014). This background led him as governor to have a populist vision, mission, and policy direction related to preserving Bali's natural environment and its indigenous peoples. Koster, along with the Provincial DPRD, issued Bali Provincial Regulation Number 4 of 2019 concerning Traditional Villages in Bali. Article 3, paragraph (2) of the regulation states that one of the functions of this regulation is to organize institutions for the advancement of customs, religion, traditions, arts, and culture, as well as the local wisdom of the traditional village communities. Therefore, the Bali Provincial Government established a regional apparatus to handle traditional village affairs through Bali Provincial Regulation Number 7 of 2019, namely the Bali Agency for the Advancement of Indigenous Communities. This agency specifically manages and administers traditional villages.

Koster created a populist policy to preserve Balinese traditional attire, as outlined in Bali Governor Regulation Number 79 of 2018 concerning the use of Balinese traditional attire. This policy resulted in all government and private sector employees, school and university students, and public service workers wearing traditional attire every Thursday, full moon, tilem, and on the anniversary of Bali Province, August 14th. Koster also created Bali Governor Regulation Number 80 of 2018, which aims to preserve Balinese language, script, and literature. Therefore, public spaces such as office signs, streets, buildings, tourist attractions, and other public facilities use Balinese script. In the environmental field, he also created a policy banning single-use plastics, as stipulated in Bali Governor Regulation No. 97 of 2018 concerning the Limitation of Single-Use Plastic Waste Generation and Governor Regulation No. 47 of 2019 concerning Source-Based Waste Management. With these regulations, the Bali Provincial Government hopes the community will reduce plastic waste by 70% by 2025.

Koster also issued another populist policy regarding the Balinese family planning (KB) policy, changing the recommended number of children from two to four. This policy aims to preserve Balinese names: Wayan/Gede/Putu (first child), Made/Kadek/Nengah (second child), Nyoman/Komang (third child), and Ketut (fourth child). Koster narrated his concern that due to population growth in Bali, which was 14% lower than the national population growth in 2018, if this continues, the Balinese population will quickly become extinct.

== Elections ==
Since 2005 as the enactment of Law Number 32 of 2004 in Indonesia, heads of local government (governors, regents and mayors) along with their deputy have been directly elected by popular election.

The election is held every five years, elections for governor and vice governor are held for a fixed five-year term.

The first gubernatorial election in Bali by a popular vote of the people was held in 2008, where previously the governor was determined by the Bali Regional House of Representatives (DPRD) seat in Denpasar, by a system of electoral vote with a majority of votes of a total of 55 members in the DPRD.

=== Most recent election ===
The most recent election was held on 27 November 2024 to elect both the governor and vice governor of Bali for the 2025 to 2030 term. The election was held as part of local elections for governors, regents, and mayors across 36 other provinces in Indonesia.

== Governors and statistics ==
This is a stastitics list of governors who have held office in the province of Bali in Indonesia.

No.	Portrait	Name (birth–death)	Took office	Left office	Tenure	Party
Governor of Lesser Sunda
1		I Gusti Ketut Pudja (1908–1977)	19 August 1945 (Note: A member of the Preparatory Committee for Indonesian Independence (PPKI), Pudja was appointed to be Governor of the newly formed Province following the end of Japanese occupation of the Dutch East Indies.)	29 January 1946 (Note: Pudja's tenure as Governor was vacated after he handed over power to the Balinese Council of Kings following arrest by the Dutch during the period of the Indonesian National Revolution.)	163 days	Independent
Vacancy		29 January 1946	16 October 1950	4 years, 260 days	—N/a	
2		Susanto Tirtoprodjo (1900–1969)	16 October 1950	5 April 1952	1 year, 172 days	National
—N/a (Note: Acting governor.)		Sarimin Reksodihardjo (1905–1995)	5 April 1952	6 May 1953	1 year, 31 days	National
Governor of Nusa Tenggara
1		Sarimin Reksodihardjo (1905–1995)	6 May 1953	1 April 1957	3 years, 330 days	National
—N/a		I Gusti Bagus Oka (1910–1992)	1 April 1957	4 May 1957	33 days	Independent
2		Teuku Daudsjah (1929–2007)	4 May 1957	20 December 1958	1 year, 230 days	Independent

=== Residents of Bali ===
No.	Portrait	Name (birth–death)	Term	Party
1 (Note: As a Resident of Bali before Bali became a province)		Anak Agung Bagus Sutedja (1923–1966)	1950 – 1958	Independent
2		I Gusti Bagus Oka (1910–1992)	1958 – 14 Agust 1959	Independent

=== Governors of Bali ===
No.	Portrait	Name (birth–death)	Took office	Left office	Tenure	Party	Election	Vice Governor
1		Anak Agung Bagus Sutedja (1923–1966)	14 August 1959	18 December 1965	6 years	Independent	1959	Dewa Made Wedagama (Note: as a Regional Secretary, the role of deputy governor was filled by the regional secretary until the end of 1965.)
2		I Gusti Putu Martha (1913–1992)	18 December 1965	1 November 1967	2 years	National	1965	I Gusti Ngurah Pindha
3		Soekarmen (1925–1988)	1 November 1967	27 August 1978	11 years	Military	1967	I Gusti Ngurah Pindha
4		Ida Bagus Mantra (1928–1995)	August 27, 1978	August 27, 1988	10 years	Golkar	1978 1983	Vacant I Dewa Gde Oka
5		Ida Bagus Oka (1936–2010)	August 27, 1988	May 23, 1998	10 years	Golkar	1988 1993	I Dewa Gde Oka Ahim Abdurahim
—N/a		Ahim Abdurahim (1942–1999)	23 May 1998	28 Agust 1998	3 month 5 days	Independent	–	Vacant
6		Dewa Made Beratha (b. 1941)	29 August 1998	28 August 2008	10 years	Golkar PDI-P	1998 2003	I Gusti Bagus Alit Putra I Gusti Ngurah Kesuma Kelakan
7		I Made Mangku Pastika (b. 1951)	28 August 2008	29 August 2018	10 years, 1 day	PDI-P Democratic	2008 2013	A.A.G. Ngurah Puspayoga I Ketut Sudikerta
—N/a		Hamdani (b. 1962)	29 August 2018	5 September 2018	7 days	Nonpartisan	–	Vacant
8		I Wayan Koster (b. 1962)	5 September 2018	5 September 2023	5 years	PDI-P	2018	Tjokorda Oka Artha Ardana Sukawati
—N/a		Sang Made Mahendra Jaya (b. 1966)	5 September 2023	20 February 2025	1 year, 168 days	Nonpartisan	–	Vacant
(8)		I Wayan Koster (b. 1962)	20 February 2025	Incumbent	1 year, 244 days	PDI-P	2024	I Nyoman Giri Prasta

== See also ==
- Vice Governor of Bali
- List of incumbent regional heads and deputy regional heads in Bali
- Bali Regional House of Representatives
- Regional regulation (Indonesia)
- Politics of Indonesia
- Subdivisions of Indonesia
- Provinces of Indonesia
- List of current Indonesian governors
