= I Gede Winasa =

Indonesian politician (born 1950)

- ᬇᬕᭂᬤᬾᬯᬶᬦᬲ
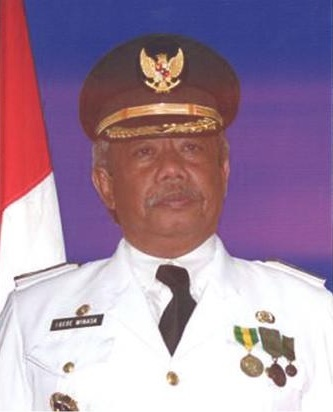
- Official portrait, 2006

11th and 12th Regent of Jembrana
- In office 2000–2010
- Preceded by: Ida Bagus Indugosa
- Succeeded by: I Putu Artha

Personal details
- Born: March 9, 1950 (age 76) Denpasar, Indonesia
- Party: PDI-P
- Other political affiliations: Democratic
- Spouse: Ratna Ani Lestari (divorced 2012)
- Children: 4 (including I Gede Ngurah Patriana Krisna)

I Gede Winasa (Balinese: ᬇᬕᭂᬤᬾᬯᬶᬦᬲ; born 9 March 1950) is an Indonesian politician who was the 11th and 12th regent of Jembrana regency of Bali from 2000 to 2010, when he was forced to step down because of term limits. He ran unsuccessfully for governor of Bali in 2008.

He was married to a Banyuwangi regent Ratna Ani Lestari until 2013, when she divorced him. The Supreme Court of Indonesia sentenced him to seven years of prison in 2017 for a graft case.

== Background ==
Winasa was born in Denpasar, Bali's capital, on 9 March 1950.
