= Vice Governor of Bali =

Second-highest elected officeholder in the Province Bali, Indonesia

- Wakil Gubernur Bali
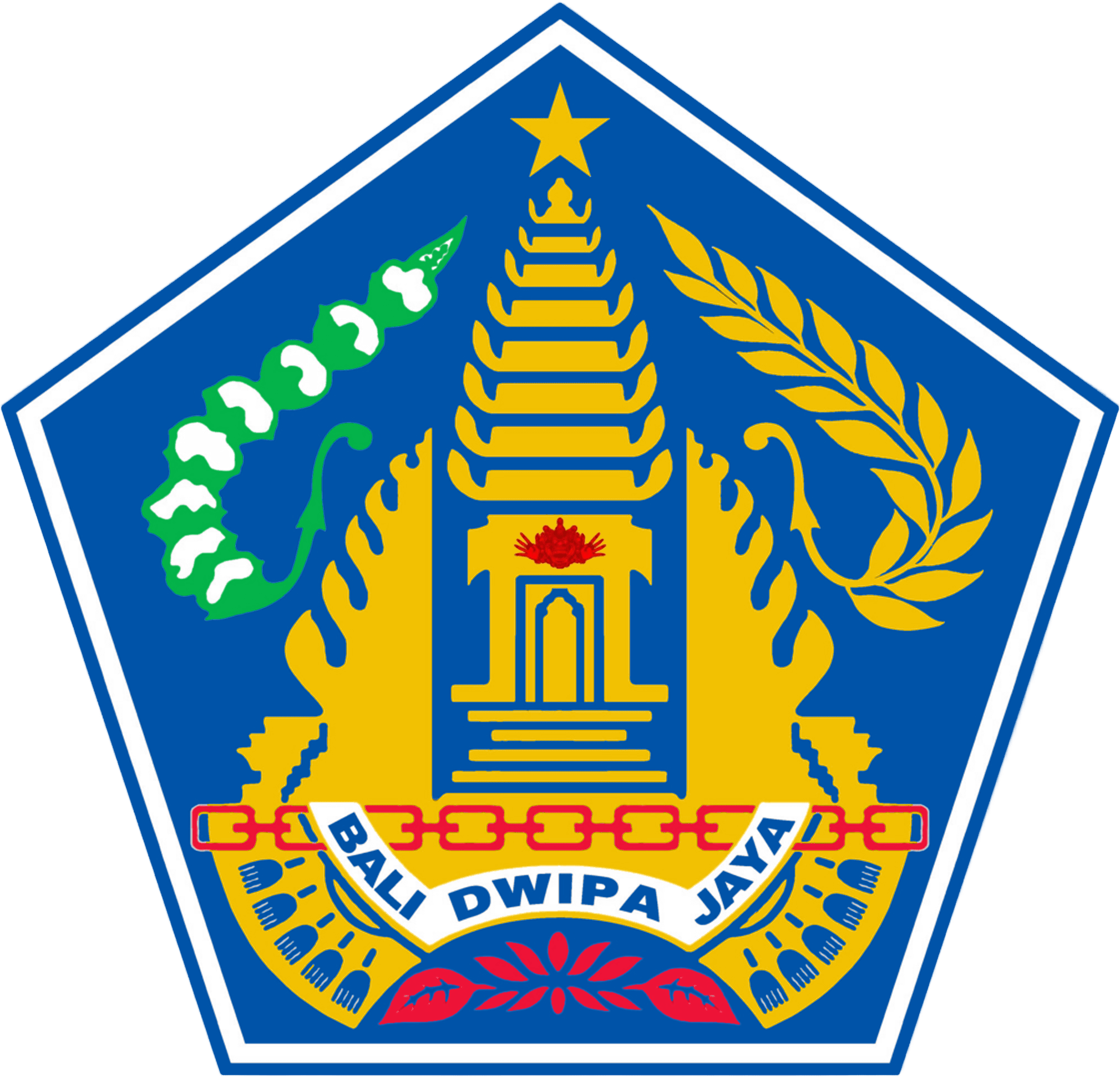
- Coat of arms of Bali

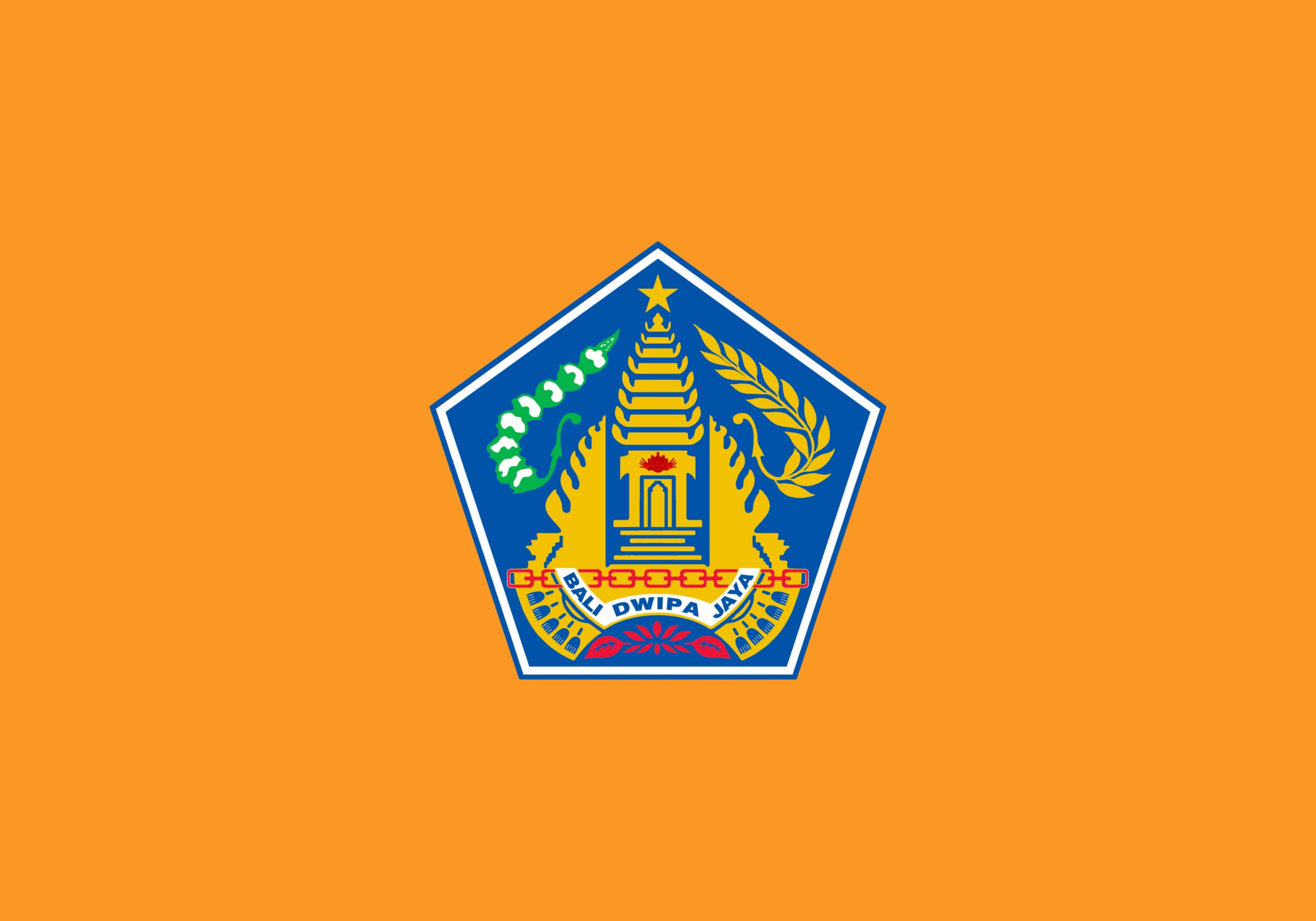
- Flag of Bali (non-civil)

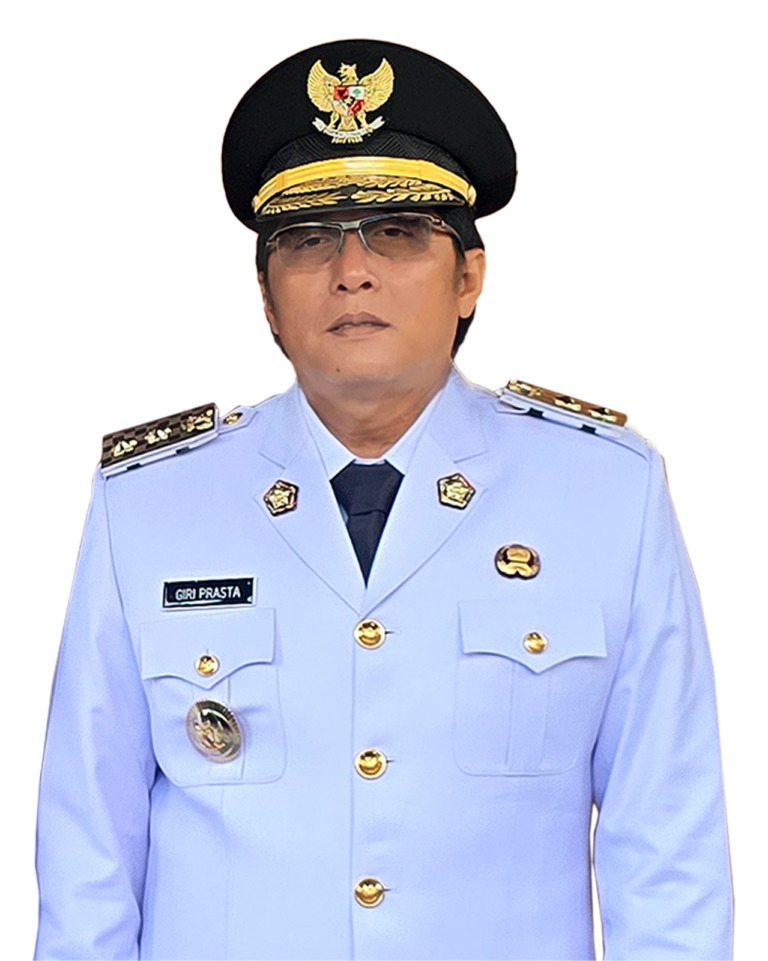
- Incumbent; I Nyoman Giri Prasta since 20 February 2025
- Bali Provincial Government
- Style: Mr. Vice Governor (informal); The Honorable (formal); His Excellency (international correspondence/diplomatic)
- Type: Executive
- Status: Deputy of governor of Bali
- Abbreviation: VGOB (in English); Wagub. Bali (in Indonesian)
- Residence: Official Residence of the Vice Governor of Bali, South Denpasar, Denpasar
- Seat: Denpasar
- Nominator: Political parties
- Appointer: Direct popular elections within Bali
- Term length: Five years, renewable once
- Precursor: Vice Governor of Lesser Sunda; Regional Secretary of Bali (Note: the role of deputy governor was filled by the regional secretary until the end of 1965)
- Formation: 1965; 59 years ago
- First holder: I Gusti Ngurah Pindha
- Salary: Rp2,4 million (US$143,57) per month
- Website: Short profile of governor and vice governor of Bali (in Indonesian)

The Vice Governor of Bali (Indonesian: Wakil Gubernur Bali) is the deputy head of the first-level in the Bali Provincial Government who holds the government in Bali together with the governor and 55 members of the Bali Regional House of Representatives (DPRD). The governor and vice governor of Bali can be elected through general elections which are held every 5 years. The current vice governor of Bali is I Nyoman Giri Prasta.

== History ==
On August 14, 1958, the Province of Bali was formed, which was originally a residential area of the Province of Lesser Sunda Islands or Nusa Tenggara into an autonomous province in Indonesia. The Province of Bali has been under the auspices of various leaders who have changed the socio-economic and cultural conditions of the Balinese people. There have been at least nine governors and two acting governors who have led the Province of Bali with various backgrounds such as bureaucrats/non-party civil servants, the military and political parties.

== Elections ==
Since 2005 as the enactment of Law Number 32 of 2004 in Indonesia, heads of local government (governors, regents and mayors) along with their deputy have been directly elected by popular election.

The election is held every five years, elections for governor and vice governor are held for a fixed five-year term.

The first gubernatorial election in Bali by a popular vote of the people was held in 2008, where previously the governor was determined by the Bali Regional House of Representatives (DPRD) seat in Denpasar, by a system of electoral vote with a majority of votes of a total of 55 members in the DPRD.

=== Most recent election ===
The most recent election was held on 27 November 2024 to elect both the governor and vice governor of Bali for the 2025 to 2030 term. The election was held as part of local elections for governors, regents, and mayors across 36 other provinces in Indonesia.

== Vice Governors and statistics ==
Indonesian Democratic Party of Struggle (PDI-P)
Party of Functional Groups (Golkar)
Democratic Party (Demokrat)
Independent

Vice Governor of Bali
No.	Portrait	Vice Governor	Start of Term	End of Term	Governor
1		I Gusti Ngurah Pindha	10 January 1966	22 January 1971	I Gusti Putu Martha; Soekarmen
2		I Dewa Gde Oka	2 March 1985	2 September 1989	Ida Bagus Mantra; Ida Bagus Oka
3		Aspar Aswin	2 September 1989	19 July 1993	Ida Bagus Oka
4		Ahim Abdurahim	19 July 1993	1998	Ida Bagus Oka
5		I Gusti Bagus Alit Putra	1998	28 August 2003	Dewa Made Beratha
5		I Ketut Widjana (Economic and Development Affairs)	1998	28 August 2003	Dewa Made Beratha
6		I Gusti Ngurah Kesuma Kelakan	28 August 2003	28 August 2008	Dewa Made Beratha
7		A.A. Ngurah Puspayoga	28 August 2008	29 August 2013	I Made Mangku Pastika
8		I Ketut Sudikerta	29 August 2013	29 August 2018	I Made Mangku Pastika
9		Tjokorda Oka Artha; Ardana Sukawati	5 September 2018	5 September 2023	I Wayan Koster
10		I Nyoman Giri Prasta	20 February 2025	Incumbent	I Wayan Koster

== See also ==
- Governor of Bali
- List of incumbent regional heads and deputy regional heads in Bali
- Bali Regional House of Representatives
- Regional regulation (Indonesia)
- Politics of Indonesia
- Subdivisions of Indonesia
- Provinces of Indonesia
