= I Gusti Putu Martha =

Indonesian politician

- ᬇᬕᬸᬲ᭄ᬢᬶᬧᬸᬢᬸᬫᬃᬝ
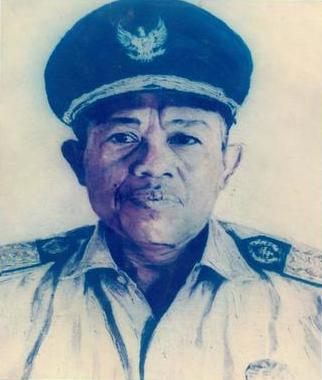
- Official portrait, 1965

2nd Governor of Bali
- In office 18 December 1965 – 1 November 1967
- Vice Governor: I Gusti Ngurah Pindha
- Preceded by: Anak Agung Bagus Suteja
- Succeeded by: Soekarmen

Personal details
- Born: 1913
- Died: 1992 (aged 78–79)
- Party: PNI

I Gusti Putu Martha (Balinese: ᬇᬕᬸᬲ᭄ᬢᬶᬧᬸᬢᬸᬫᬃᬝ; 1913–1992) was the second governor of the Indonesian province of Bali from 1965 to 1967.
