= Bali Regional House of Representatives =

Unicameral legislature of the Indonesian province of Bali

Bali Province Regional House of Representatives Dewan Perwakilan Rakyat Daerah Provinsi Bali ᬤᬾᬯᬦ᭄ᬧᭂᬃᬯᬓᬶᬮᬦ᭄ᬭᬓᬢ᭄ᬤᬳᬾᬭᬄᬧ᭄ᬭᭀᬯ᬴ᬶᬦ᭄ᬲᬶᬩᬮᬶ
- 2024–2029 Period
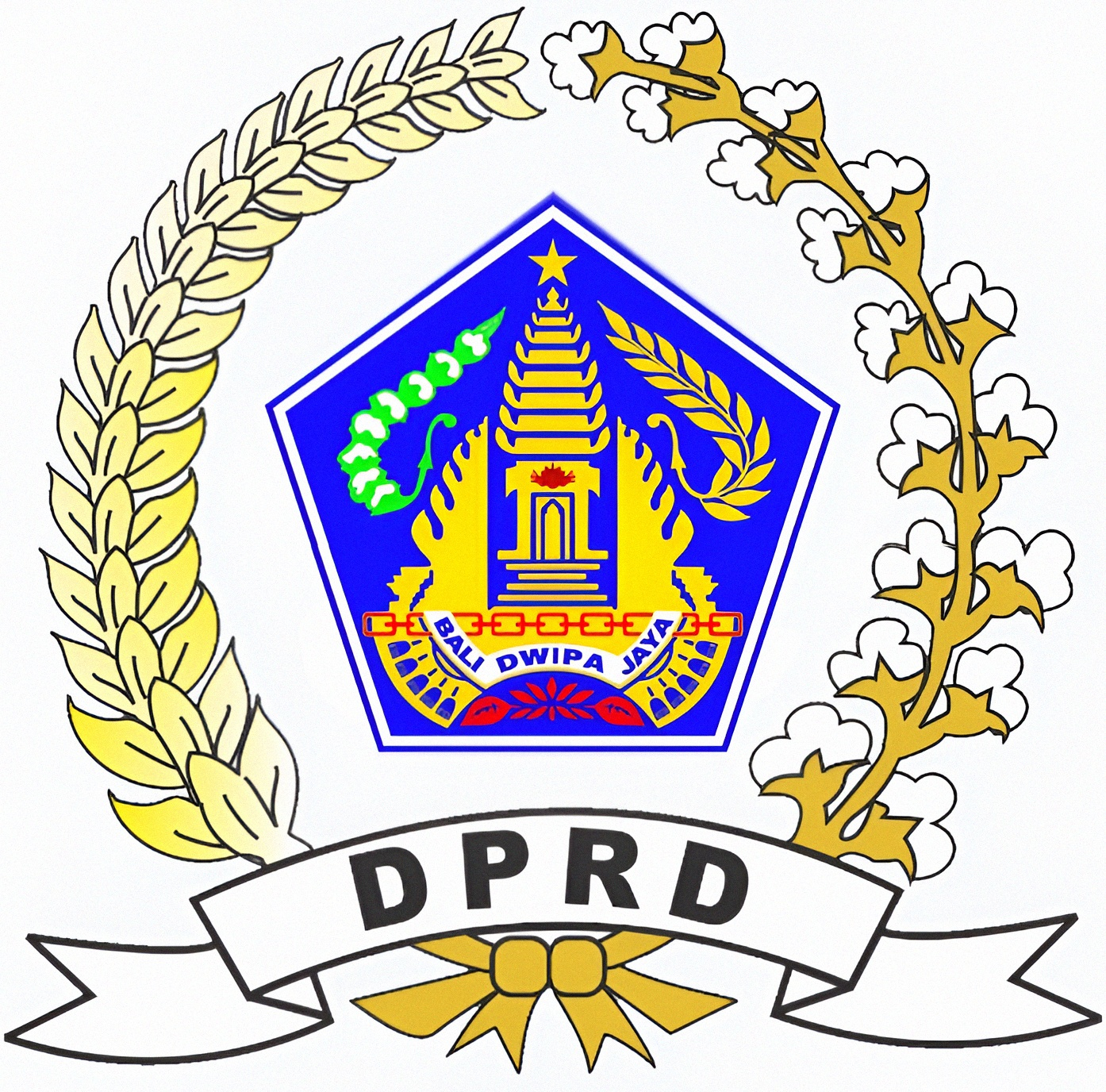

Type
- Type: Unicameral
- Term limits: 5 years

History
- Founded: 1950; 76 years ago
- Preceded by: Paruman Agung
- New session started: 2 September 2024

Leadership
- Speaker: Dewa Made Mahayadnya, PDI-P since 8 October 2024
- Deputy Speaker: I Wayan Disel Astawa, Gerindra since 8 October 2024
- Deputy Speaker: I.G.K. Kresna Budi, Golkar since 8 October 2024
- Deputy Speaker: I Komang Nova Sewi Putra, Democratic since 8 October 2024

Structure
- Seats: 55
- Political groups: Government (32): PDI-P (32); Supported by (5): Democratic (3); NasDem (2); Opposition (18): Gerindra (10); Golkar (7); PSI (1)

Elections
- Voting system: Open list proportional representation
- Last election: 14 February 2024
- Next election: 2029

Meeting place
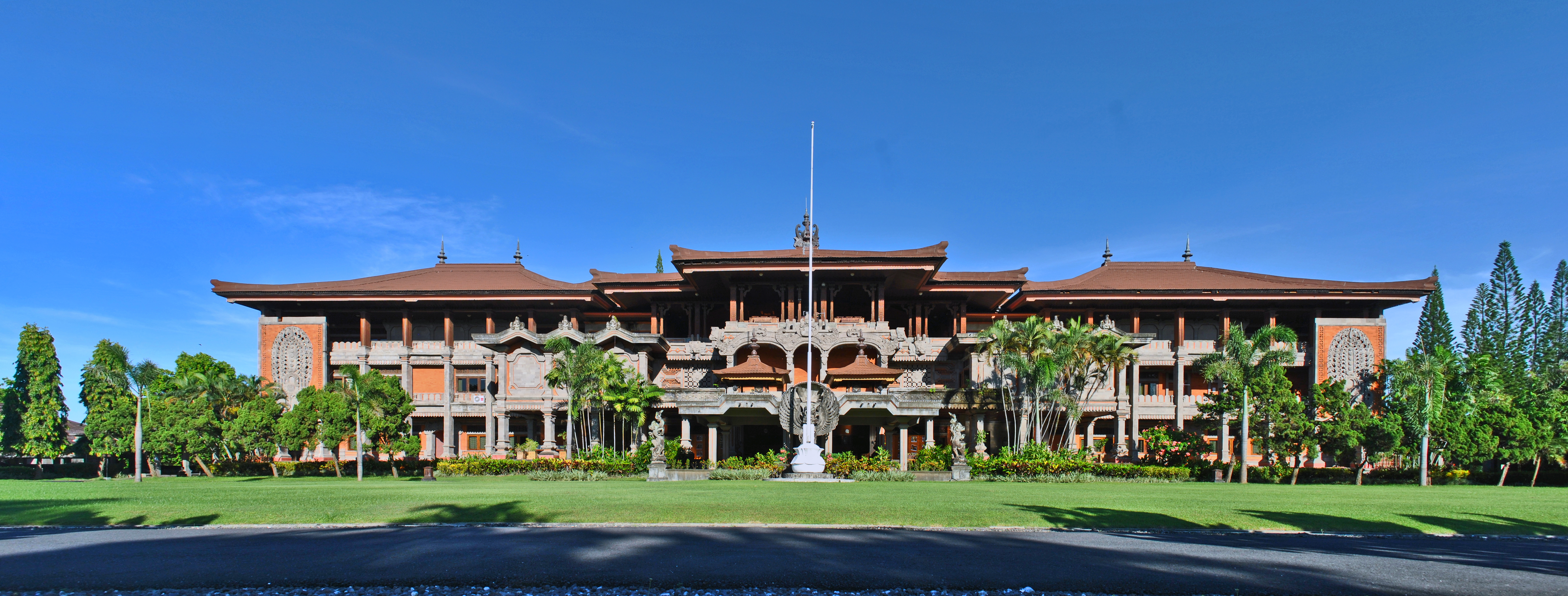
- Bali Provincial DPRD Building; Dr. Kusuma Atmadja Street No. 3 Postal code 80234; South Denpasar, Denpasar; Bali, Indonesia
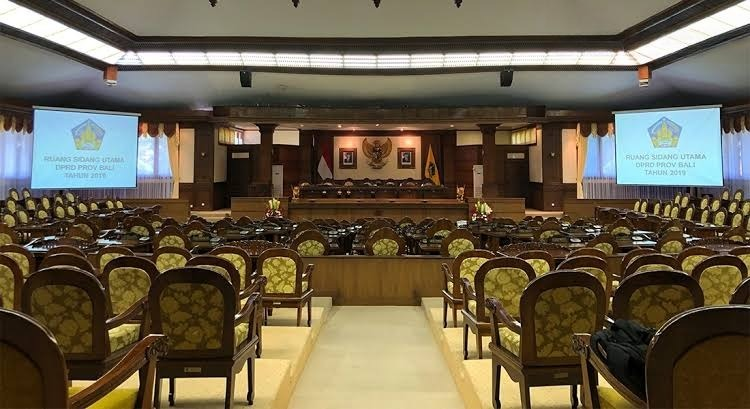

Website
- sekwandprd.baliprov.go.id

The Bali Regional House of Representatives (Indonesian: Dewan Perwakilan Rakyat Daerah Provinsi Bali; Balinese: ᬤᬾᬯᬦ᭄ᬧᭂᬃᬯᬓᬶᬮᬦ᭄ᬭᬓᬢ᭄ᬤᬳᬾᬭᬄᬧ᭄ᬭᭀᬯ᬴ᬶᬦ᭄ᬲᬶᬩᬮᬶ, abbreviated to DPRD Bali) is the unicameral legislature of the Indonesian province of Bali. It is composed of 55 members who are elected through general elections once five years, simultaneously with the national legislative election. The leadership of the Bali Provincial DPRD consists of 1 speaker and 3 deputy speakers who come from the political party with the largest number of seats and votes.

The members of the Bali Provincial DPRD for the 2024–2029 term were elected in the 2024 general election and officially sworn in on 2 September 2024, at the Bali Provincial DPRD Building. The regional house is made up of representatives from six political parties, with the Indonesian Democratic Party of Struggle holding the largest share by 32 seats and make it to save the majority seats.

== History ==
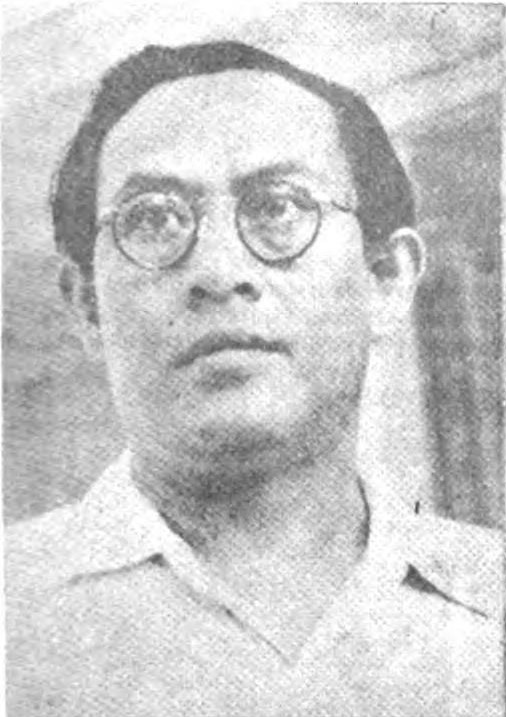
Anak Agung Nyoman Pandji Tisna (pictured) was elected as the Speaker of the Paruman Agung (Bali's first legislature).

During the Dutch East Indies government and throughout the Japanese occupation, Bali maintained a quasi-legislative/advisory body, the Paruman Agung, founded in 1938 and counting eight monarchs of Bali as members. In the Indonesian National Revolution, the Paruman Agung was expanded to include 36 members in 1946, and in 1947 the body was divided into a council for the monarchs and a separate council of representatives to be elected.

By 1950, the council of monarchs was abolished, and legislative functions was transferred to a democratically elected Regional House of Representatives (DPRD). I Gusti Putu Merta served as the DPRD inaugural speaker. Among the early laws adopted by the speaker was the annulling of all local laws prohibiting inter-caste marriage in 1951, greatly changing Balinese society. The first election to the DPRD was held in 1955, with the Indonesian National Party winning the most votes and seats, followed by the Indonesian Socialist Party and the Indonesian Communist Party.

The legislature's current building was inaugurated in 1988, and was renovated after a fire in 2000. Prior to the current building, the legislature convened in a one-story building in the Sanur area of Denpasar.

== Role and function ==
The Bali Provincial DPRD is a regional people's representative institution whose position is as an organizing element of Regional Government in the Province of Bali.

The function of the Bali Provincial DPRD as regulated in Bali Provincial DPRD Regulation No. 10 of 2009 concerning the Rules of Procedure of the Bali Provincial DPRD is to make regional regulations together with the governor and carry out supervisory functions.

=== Powers ===
DPRD powers are classified under Law No. 17 of 2014 as legislative, budgeting, and supervisory powers, which includes creating regional laws, approving budgets proposed by the regional heads (governos/mayors/regents), and monitoring the spending of funds. Additionally, DPRD could propose the removal of a regional head the Ministry of Home Affairs, and may declare impeachment of a regional head. However, DPRD cannot remove regional heads from their positions, which remained the authority of the Supreme Court of Indonesia.

== Membership and elections ==
All DPRD members must be elected as members of political parties.

From the 1971 election until 2024, elections for DPRD were held simultaneously with those for the national legislature, the DPR. However, following a Constitutional Court decision in 2025, starting from the 2029 election, DPRD elections will be held separately from the national legislative elections.

Members are elected for five-year terms without term limits.. An exception applies for the elected members of the 2024-2029 period, whose term is extended until 2031 due to the new requirement of a 2-2.5 year gap between national elections and local elections.

Since the 2004 election, DPRD members have been elected through an open list proportional representation system, using the Sainte-Laguë method to allocate seats since the 2019 election.

The national parliamentary threshold, used in elections to the DPR, does not apply to DPRD elections. Although the 2014 election initially proposed a 3.5 percent threshold for both DPR and DPRD, the Constitutional Court of Indonesia struck down the threshold for DPRDs in 2013, limiting it to DPR elections only.

== General election results ==
=== 2024 Indonesian legislative election ===
The following is the votes acquisition and seats acquisition parties competing in 2024 of the Bali Regional House of Representatives as a results of the 2024 general election.

| Ballot number | Political party | Vote acquisition | | Seat acquisition | Seat changes (2019) |
|---|---|---|---|---|---|
| 3 | PDI-P | 1,446,583 | 57.18% | 32 / 55 | ▼1 |
| 2 | Gerindra | 324,648 | 12.83% | 10 / 55 | ▲4 |
| 4 | Golkar | 322,569 | 12.75% | 7 / 55 | ▼1 |
| 14 | Democratic | 152,506 | 6.03% | 3 / 55 | ▼1 |
| 5 | NasDem | 85,335 | 3.37% | 2 / 55 | Steady |
| 15 | PSI | 52,517 | 2.08% | 1 / 55 | Steady |
| 1 | PKB | 47,774 | 1.89% | 0 / 55 | |
| 8 | PKS | 21,279 | 0.84% | 0 / 55 | |
| 7 | Gelora | 18,375 | 0.73% | 0 / 55 | |
| 10 | Hanura | 16,885 | 0.67% | 0 / 55 | ▼1 |
| 17 | PPP | 8,829 | 0.35% | 0 / 55 | |
| 6 | Labour | 8,573 | 0.34% | 0 / 55 | |
| 16 | Perindo | 7,573 | 0.30% | 0 / 55 | |
| 9 | PKN | 6,922 | 0.27% | 0 / 55 | |
| 12 | PAN | 3,825 | 0.15% | 0 / 55 | |
| 11 | Garuda | 3,125 | 0.12% | 0 / 55 | |
| 24 | Ummat | 1,709 | 0.07% | 0 / 55 | |
| 13 | PBB | 914 | 0.04% | 0 / 55 | |
| Total | | 2,529,941 | 100.00% | 55 | |

== Composition ==
Map of votes and seats acquisition in each electoral districts (constituency) in the 2024 legislative election, PDI-P won everything.

In the 2024 legislative election, the Bali Provincial DPRD placed 55 representatives spread across several factions, with the most votes won by the Indonesian Democratic Party of Struggle (PDI-P).

The following is the composition of the members of the Bali Provincial DPRD in the last four periods.

| Political Party | Number of Seats in Period | | | |
| Political Party | 2009–2014 | 2014–2019 | 2019–2024 | 2024–2029 |
|---|---|---|---|---|
| PDI-P | 24 | 24 | ▲33 | ▼32 |
| Gerindra | 2 | ▲7 | ▼6 | ▲10 |
| Golkar | 12 | ▼11 | ▼8 | ▼7 |
| Democratic | 10 | ▼8 | ▼4 | ▼3 |
| NasDem | | 2 | 2 | 2 |
| PSI | | | 1 | 1 |
| Hanura | 1 | 1 | 1 | ▼0 |
| PAN | | 1 | ▼0 | 0 |
| PKPI | 1 | 1 | ▼0 | |
| PNIM | 1 | | | |
| PKPB | 1 | | | |
| Pakar Pangan | 1 | | | |
| PNBK | 2 | | | |
| Number of Members | 55 | 55 | 55 | 55 |
| Number of Parties | 10 | ▼8 | ▼7 | ▼6 |

== Parliamentary groups ==
=== Factions ===
Just like in the national legislature (DPR) the DPRD also has a parliamentary groups called faction or fraction (Indonesian: Fraksi, has a similarities to Fraktion in Germany), a faction is a forum for the DPRD members to gather in order to optimize the implementation of the functions, duties, and authorities as well as the rights and obligations of the DPRD. Each faction has at least the same number of members as the number of commissions in the DPRD. One faction in the Bali Provincial DPRD has at least 4 members. The Bali Provincial DPRD for the 2024-2029 period consists of 4 factions as follows:

| Faction | Member Parties | Chairman | Number of Members |
|---|---|---|---|
| PDI-P Faction | PDI-P | I Made Supartha | 32 |
| Gerindra-PSI Faction | Gerindra; PSI | I Gede Harja Astawa | 11 |
| Golkar Faction | Golkar | Agung Bagus Tri Candra Arka | 7 |
| Democratic-NasDem Faction | Democratic; NasDem | Dr. Somvir | 5 |

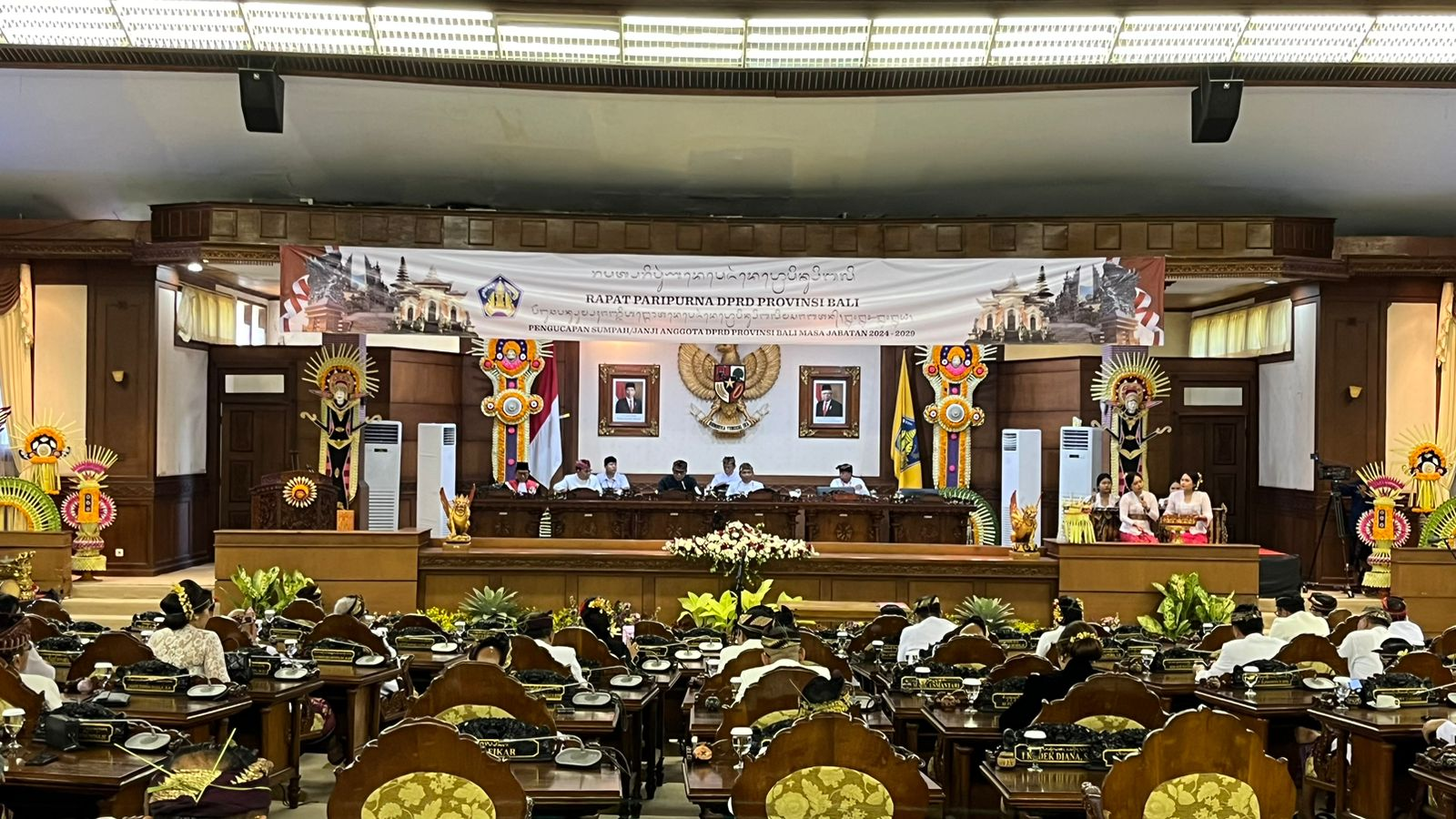
Bali Provincial DPRD plenary meeting, 2024–2029 period

== Structure ==
Based on Article 110 Law of the Republic of Indonesia Number 23 of 2014 concerning Regional Government, the DPRD Equipment (AKD) of the Province consists of:

1. Leadership
2. Deliberative Body (Bamus)
3. Commission
4. Regional Regulation Formation Body (Bapemperda)
5. Budget Agency (Banggar)
6. Honorary Council (BK)
7. Other Equipment (formed through a Plenary Meeting)

=== Leadership ===
According to laws and regulations, the Provincial DPRD which has members: 35-44 people led by 1 speaker and 2 deputy speaker; 45-84 people led by 1 speaker and 3 deputy speaker; and 85-100 people led by 1 speaker and 4 deputy speaker. The leadership of the Bali DPRD consists of 1 Speaker and 3 Deputy Speaker who come from the political parties that won the first, second, and third most seats (and votes), respectively. PDI-P's Dewa Made Mahayadnya has served as speaker of the legislature since 8 October 2024. The following is a list of the Speakers of the Bali Provincial DPRD in the last three periods:

| DPRD Period | Speaker | Political Party | Started Serving | Ended Serving |
|---|---|---|---|---|
| 2009–2014 | Anak Agung Ngurah Oka Ratmadi | PDI-P | 2009 | 2014 |
| 2014–2019 | I Nyoman Adi Wiryatama | PDI-P | September 1, 2014 | September 1, 2019 |
| 2019–2024 | I Nyoman Adi Wiryatama | PDI-P | September 2, 2019 | September 2, 2024 |
| 2024-2029 | Dewa Made Mahayadnya | PDI-P | October 8, 2024 | Incumbent |

=== Commissions ===
According to the provisions of the law, the Provincial DPRD with 35-55 members can form 4 commissions and the Provincial DPRD with more than 55 members can form 5 commissions. The Bali Provincial DPRD has four commissions as follows:

- Commission I for Law, Security, Politics, and Apparatus.
- Commission II for Tourism, Finance, and Regional Taxes.
- Commission III for Regional Development (Public Works, Urban Planning, Parks, Cleanliness, Transportation, Mining and Energy, Public Housing, Environment, Licensing and Forestry).
- Commission IV for Education, Arts, Customs, and Culture.

The following are the leaders of the AKD (bodies and commissions) of the Bali Provincial DPRD for the 2024-2029 period:

| AKD Name | Chairperson | Political Party |
|---|---|---|
| Deliberative Body (BAMUS) | Dewa Made Mahayadnya | PDI-P |
| Budget Body (BANGGAR) | Dewa Made Mahayadnya | PDI-P |
| Regional Regulation Formation Agency (BAPEMPERDA) | I Ketut Tama Tenaya | PDI-P |
| Honorary Body (BK) | I Ketut Suryadi | PDI-P |
| Commission I | I Nyoman Budiutama | PDI-P |
| Commission II | Agung Bagus Pratiksa Linggih | Golkar |
| Commission III | I Nyoman Suyasa | Gerindra |
| Commission IV | I Nyoman Suwirta | PDI-P |

== Electoral districts/constituencies ==
Map of electoral districts of the Bali Provincial DPRD along with the number of seats in the 2019 and 2024 legislative election

In the 2019 legislative election and 2024 legislative election, the Bali Provincial DPRD election is divided into 9 electoral districts known as Dapil (constituency) as follows:

| Constituency Name | Constituency Region | Number of Seats |
|---|---|---|
| BALI 1 | Denpasar City | 8 |
| BALI 2 | Badung Regency | 6 |
| BALI 3 | Tabanan Regency | 6 |
| BALI 4 | Jembrana Regency | 4 |
| BALI 5 | Buleleng Regency | 12 |
| BALI 6 | Bangli Regency | 3 |
| BALI 7 | Karangasem Regency | 7 |
| BALI 8 | Klungkung Regency | 3 |
| BALI 9 | Gianyar Regency | 6 |
| TOTAL | | 55 |

== List of members ==
=== Current members ===
==== 2024–2029 period ====
| Member | Political Party | Electoral District (Constituency) | Valid Votes | Description |
|---|---|---|---|---|
| I Gusti Ngurah Gede Marhaendra Jaya | PDI-P | Bali 1 | 30,585 | Seceratry of Commission IV |
| Anak Agung Istri Paramita Dewi | PDI-P | Bali 1 | 23,203 | Commission II |
| Anak Agung Gede Agung Suyoga | PDI-P | Bali 1 | 23,096 | Commission I |
| Ni Wayan Sari Galung | PDI-P | Bali 1 | 22,624 | Commission IV |
| Ni Made Sumiati | PDI-P | Bali 2 | 5,439 | Replacing Bagus Alit Sucipta due to participate in the 2024 Badung regency election. Commission IV. |
| I Wayan Bawa | PDI-P | Bali 2 | 32,414 | Commission I |
| I Ketut Tama Tenaya | PDI-P | Bali 2 | 17,785 | Commission II |
| I Nyoman Laka | PDI-P | Bali 2 | 15,432 | Commission III |
| I Ketut Purnaya | PDI-P | Bali 3 | 51,035 | Deputy Chairperson of Commission III |
| Ni Made Usmantari | PDI-P | Bali 3 | 45,948 | Commission II |
| I Ketut Suryadi | PDI-P | Bali 3 | 44,947 | Commission IV |
| I Made Supartha | PDI-P | Bali 3 | 27,199 | Commission I |
| I Gusti Agung Bagus Suradnyana | PDI-P | Bali 4 | 41,165 | Replacing I Made Kembang Hartawan due to participate in the 2024 Jembrana regency election. Commission II. |
| I Ketut Sugiasa | PDI-P | Bali 4 | 14,546 | Commission III |
| I Kadek Setiawan | PDI-P | Bali 5 | 34,931 | Commission III |
| I Ketut Rochineng | PDI-P | Bali 5 | 31,922 | Commission I |
| Dewa Made Mahayadnya | PDI-P | Bali 5 | 29,640 | DPRD Speaker |
| Gede Kusuma Putra | PDI-P | Bali 5 | 24,424 | Deputy Chairperson of Commission II |
| Putu Mangku Mertayasa | PDI-P | Bali 5 | 16,864 | Commission IV |
| I Dewa Nyoman Rai | PDI-P | Bali 5 | 12,835 | Deputy Chairperson of Commission I |
| I Nyoman Budiutama | PDI-P | Bali 6 | 43,328 | Chairperson of Commission I |
| Sang Nyoman Putra Erawan | PDI-P | Bali 6 | 41,635 | Commission III |
| Ni Kadek Darmini | PDI-P | Bali 7 | 34,726 | Commission III |
| I Putu Suryandanu Willyan Richart | PDI-P | Bali 7 | 31,698 | Commission III |
| I Nyoman Oka Antara | PDI-P | Bali 7 | 23,136 | Secretary of Commission I |
| I Nyoman Suwirta | PDI-P | Bali 8 | 51,760 | Chairperson of Commission IV |
| Tjokorda Gede Agung | PDI-P | Bali 8 | 11,600 | Commission II |
| Putu Diah Pradnya Maharani | PDI-P | Bali 9 | 133,868 | Commission IV |
| I Wayan Tagel Winarta | PDI-P | Bali 9 | 49,994 | Commission I |
| I Made Rai Warsa | PDI-P | Bali 9 | 21,225 | Commission IV |
| Ni Luh Yuniati | PDI-P | Bali 9 | 17,022 | Commission III |
| I Made Budastra | PDI-P | Bali 9 | 12,501 | Commission II |
| Zulfikar | Gerindra | Bali 1 | 2,726 | Commission I |
| I Wayan Subawa | Gerindra | Bali 1 | 2,627 | Replacing Made Muliawan Arya due to participate in the 2024 Bali gubernatorial election. Commission IV |
| I Wayan Disel Astawa | Gerindra | Bali 2 | 22,086 | Deputy Speaker of DPRD |
| I Gde Ketut Nugrahita Pendit | Gerindra | Bali 3 | 20,287 | Commission IV |
| I Kade Darma Susila | Gerindra | Bali 4 | 13,197 | Secretary of Commission II |
| Nyoman Ray Yusha | Gerindra | Bali 5 | 12,416 | Commission III |
| I Gede Harja Astawa | Gerindra | Bali 5 | 9,028 | Commission I |
| I Nyoman Suyasa | Gerindra | Bali 7 | 27,778 | Chairperson of Commission III |
| I Ketut Mandia | Gerindra | Bali 8 | 16,042 | Replacing I Ketut Juliarta due to participate in the 2024 Klungkung regency election |
| I Kadek Diana | Gerindra | Bali 9 | 11,971 | Commission II |
| Ketut Suwandhi | Gerindra | Bali 1 | 19,669 | Commission II |
| Agung Bagus Tri Candra Arka | Gerindra | Bali 2 | 21,746 | Commission IV |
| I Nyoman Wirya | Golkar | Bali 3 | 15,812 | Deputy Chairperson of Commission IV |
| Ida Gede Komang Kresna Budi | Golkar | Bali 5 | 25,154 | Deputy Speaker of DPRD |
| Agung Bagus Pratiksa Linggih | Golkar | Bali 5 | 12,092 | Chairperson of Commission II |
| I Wayan Gunawan | Golkar | Bali 6 | 17,244 | Commission I |
| Ni Putu Yuli Artini | Golkar | Bali 7 | 20,046 | Commission III |
| I Gede Ghumi Asvatham | Democratic | Bali 4 | 29,941 | Commission II |
| I Komang Nova Sewi Putra | Democratic | Bali 5 | 14,280 | Deputy speaker of DPRD |
| I Komang Wirawan | Democratic | Bali 7 | 26,698 | Secretary of Commission III |
| Dr. Somvir | NasDem | Bali 5 | 12,286 | Commission I |
| I Gusti Ayu Mas Sumantri | NasDem | Bali 7 | 26,034 | Commission IV |
| Grace Anastasia Surya Widjaja | PSI | Bali 1 | 8,649 | Commission II |

=== 2019-2024 period ===
| Member | Political Party | Electoral District (Constituency) | Valid Votes | Description |
|---|---|---|---|---|
| Anak Agung Gede Agung Suyoga | PDI-P | Bali 1 | 38,331 | Commission I |
| Ni Wayan Sari Galun | PDI-P | Bali 1 | 26,210 | |
| I Gusti Putu Budiarta | PDI-P | Bali 1 | 20,628 | |
| I Wayan Kariarta | PDI-P | Bali 1 | 19,089 | |
| Anak Agung Ngurah Adhi Ardhana | PDI-P | Bali 1 | 19,060 | Commission II |
| Bagus Alit Sucipta | PDI-P | Bali 2 | 111,741 | |
| I Ketut Tama Tenaya | PDI-P | Bali 2 | 22,536 | |
| I Nyoman Laka | PDI-P | Bali 2 | 15,007 | |
| I Made Duama | PDI-P | Bali 2 | 14,603 | Commission I |
| I Nyoman Adi Wiryatama | PDI-P | Bali 3 | 88,061 | DPRD Speaker |
| I Ketut Purnaya | PDI-P | Bali 3 | 40,652 | |
| I Ketut Suryadi | PDI-P | Bali 3 | 37,079 | |
| I Made Supartha | PDI-P | Bali 3 | 22,930 | Secretary of Commission I |
| I Gusti Ayu Diah Werdhi Srikandi Wedasteraputri Suyasa | PDI-P | Bali 4 | 28,051 | |
| I Ketut Sugiasa | PDI-P | Bali 4 | 22,514 | Commission II |
| I Gusti Ayu Aries Sujati | PDI-P | Bali 5 | 32,408 | |
| I Kadek Setiawan | PDI-P | Bali 5 | 27,238 | |
| Putu Mangku Mertayasa | PDI-P | Bali 5 | 25,829 | |
| I Ketut Rochineng | PDI-P | Bali 5 | 25,813 | Commission I |
| Gede Kusuma Putra | PDI-P | Bali 5 | 14,770 | Secretary of Commission II |
| Dewa Made Mahayadnya | PDI-P | Bali 5 | 13,615 | |
| I Nyoman Budiutana | PDI-P | Bali 6 | 36,907 | |
| I Nyoman Adyana | PDI-P | Bali 6 | 24,444 | Chairperson of Commission I |
| Ni Kadek Darmini | PDI-P | Bali 7 | 34,712 | Commission II |
| I Nyoman Oka Antara | PDI-P | Bali 7 | 23,021 | Deputy Chairperson of Commission I |
| I Nyoman Purwa Ngurah Arsana | PDI-P | Bali 7 | 14,054 | |
| Ni Luh Kadek Dwi Yustiawati | PDI-P | Bali 8 | 24,079 | |
| Tjokorda Gede Agung | PDI-P | Bali 8 | 9,885 | Commission II |
| I Kadek Diana | PDI-P | Bali 9 | 91,243 | |
| Ni Luh Yuniati | PDI-P | Bali 9 | 37,315 | |
| I Made Budastra | PDI-P | Bali 9 | 31,451 | Commission II |
| I Made Rai Warsa | PDI-P | Bali 9 | 15,800 | Commission I |
| Anak Agung Gede Agung Wira Mantara | PDI-P | Bali 9 | 14,362 | Commission I |
| I Ketut Suwandhi | Golkar | Bali 1 | 22,214 | Commission II |
| I Wayan Rawan Atmaja | Golkar | Bali 2 | 16,760 | |
| I Nyoman Wirya | Golkar | Bali 3 | 16,440 | |
| I Made Suardana | Golkar | Bali 4 | 12,565 | |
| I Nyoman Sugawa Korry | Golkar | Bali 5 | 13,312 | Deputy Speaker of the DPRD |
| Ida Gede Komang Kresna Budi | Golkar | Bali 5 | 11,535 | Chairman of Commission II |
| I Wayan Gunawan | Golkar | Bali 6 | 24,910 | Commission I |
| Ni Putu Yuli Artini | Golkar | Bali 7 | 20,142 | |
| I Wayan Disel Astawa | Gerindra | Bali 2 | 14.397 | |
| I Gde Ketut Nugrahita Pendit | Gerindra | Bali 3 | 14.95 | |

== Gallery ==
DPRD composition

Composition of the Bali Provincial DPRD as a results of the 2024 Indonesian legislative election

Composition of the Bali Provincial DPRD as a results of the 2019 Indonesian legislative election.
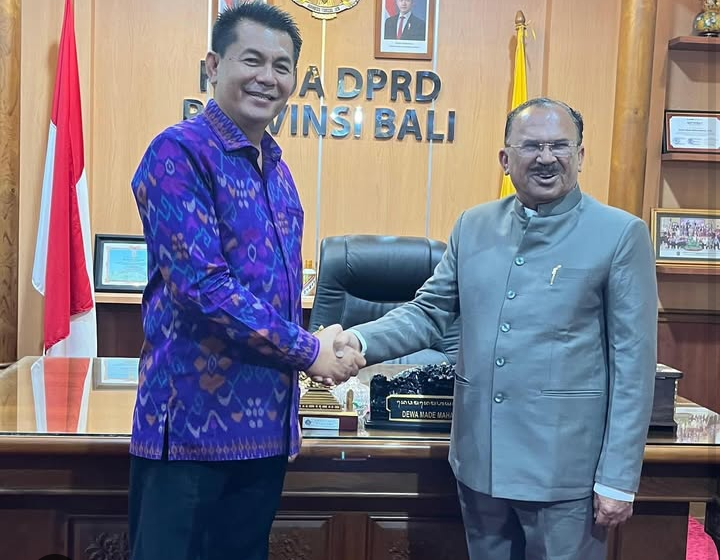
The Speaker of the Rajasthan Legislative Assembly Vasudev Devnani meet with Dewa Made Mahayadnya the Speaker of the Bali Regional House of Representatives

== See also ==
- Regional House of Representatives
- Governor of Bali
- Vice Governor of Bali
- Regional regulation (Indonesia)
- Politics of Indonesia
- Subdivisions of Indonesia
- Provinces of Indonesia
- List of legislatures
