= Ida Bagus Oka =

Indonesian politician (1936–2010)

- ᬇᬤᬩᬕᬸᬲ᭄ᬑᬓ
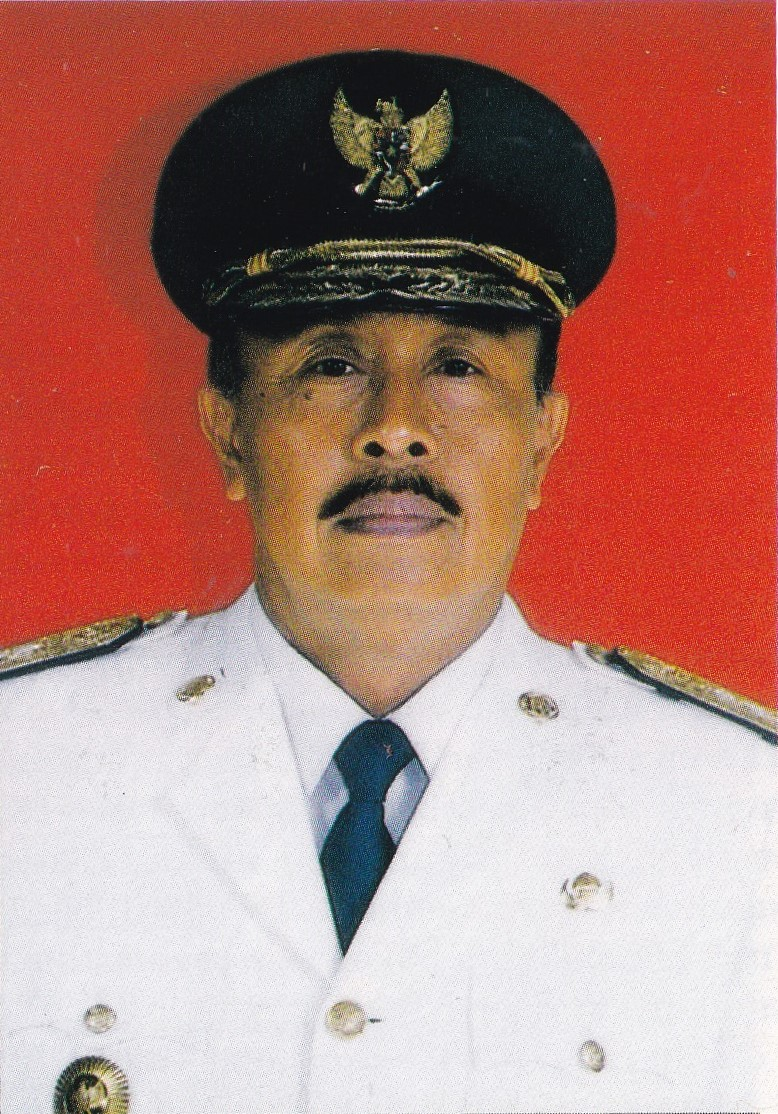
- Oficial portrait, 1988

5th Governor of Bali
- In office 27 August 1988 – 23 May 1998
- President: Suharto; B.J. Habibie
- Vice Governor: Ahim Abdurahim (1993–1998); I Dewa Gde Oka
- Preceded by: Ida Bagus Mantra
- Succeeded by: Dewa Made Beratha; Ahim Abdurahim (acting)

Personal details
- Born: 16 April 1936 Bali, Dutch East Indies
- Died: 7 March 2010 (aged 73) Sanglah, Bali, Indonesia
- Party: Golkar
- Spouse: Ida Ayu Swari
- Education: Airlangga University
- Cabinet: Development Reform Cabinet

Ida Bagus Oka (Balinese: ᬇᬤᬩᬕᬸᬲ᭄ᬑᬓ; 16 April 1936 – 7 March 2010) was the 5th governor of Bali from 1988 to 1998. He was also a State Minister of Population/Chairman of Planned Families National Coordinating Body in the Development Reform Cabinet under president B.J. Habibie.

During the Indonesian killings of 1965–1966, he instigated the Balinese Hindus to hunt down PKI supporters. He told Hindus: "There can be no doubt [that] the enemies of our revolution are also the cruelest enemies of religion, and must be eliminated and destroyed down to the roots". During this period, an estimated 80,000 Balinese were killed, roughly 5 percent of the island's population at the time.

== Honours ==
- Mahaputra Adipradana Star (13 August 1999)
- Mahaputra Utama Star (11 August 1997)

Political offices
Preceded by Ida Bagus Mantra	Governor of Bali; 1988–1993	Succeeded by Dewa Made Beratha
