= I Made Mangku Pastika =

Indonesian politician (born 1951)

AO I Madé Mangku Pastika
- ᬇᬫᬤᬾᬫᬗ᭄ᬓᬸᬧᬲ᭄ᬢᬶᬓ
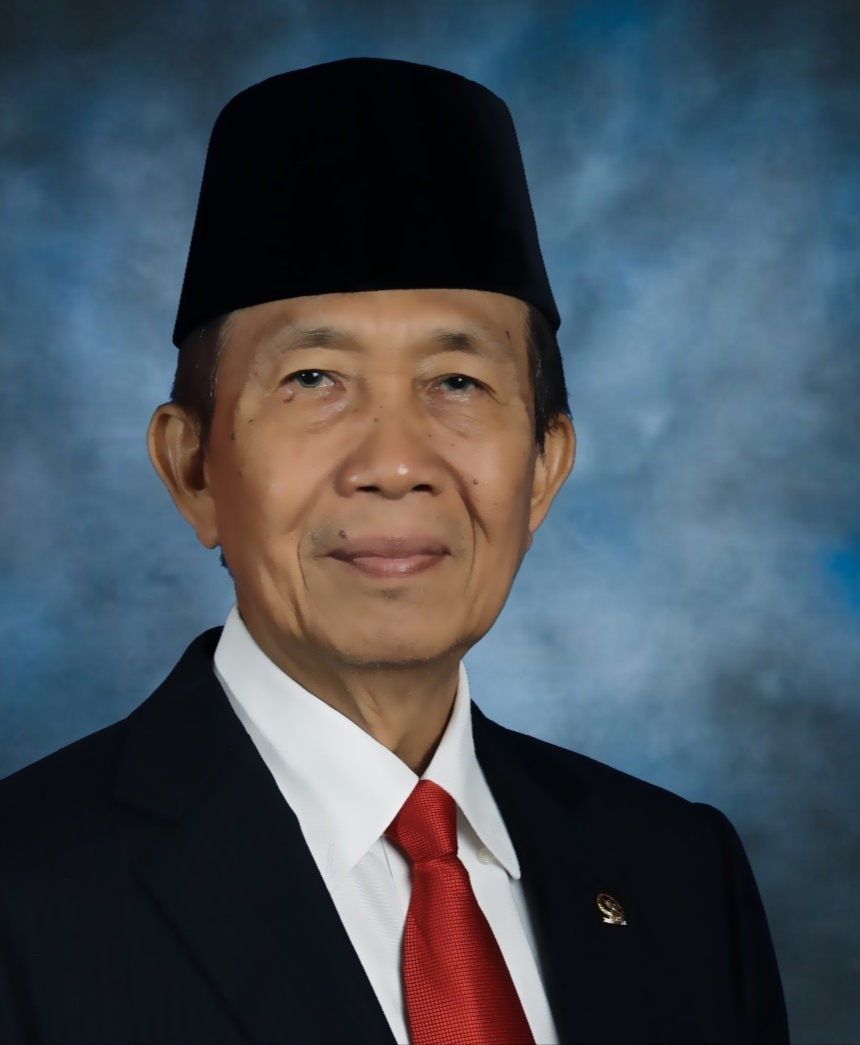
- Pastika official portrait as a senator for Bali in 2019

Indonesia Senator from Bali
- In office 1 October 2019 – 1 October 2024
- President: Joko Widodo
- Constituency: Bali
- Majority: 269.790 (2019)

7th Governor of Bali
- In office 29 August 2008 – 29 August 2018
- President: Susilo Bambang Yudhoyono; Joko Widodo
- Vice Governor: A. A. Gede Ngurah (2008–2013); I Ketut Sudikerta (2013–2018)
- Preceded by: Dewa Made Beratha
- Succeeded by: I Wayan Koster; Hamdani (acting)

Chief of Bali Regional Police
- In office 25 April 2003 – 11 December 2005
- Preceded by: Budi Setyawan
- Succeeded by: Soenarko Danu Ardanto

Chief of Papua Regional Police
- In office 22 January 2001 – 25 April 2003
- Preceded by: F.X. Sumardi
- Succeeded by: Max Donald Aer

Chief of East Nusa Tenggara Regional Police
- In office 7 October 2000 – 22 January 2001
- Preceded by: John Lalo

Personal details
- Born: 22 June 1951 (age 74) Patemon, Seririt, Buleleng, Bali, Indonesia
- Party: Independent
- Other political affiliations: Democratic (2013–2018); PDI-P (2008–2013)
- Spouse: Ni Made Ayu Putri
- Children: 3
- Occupation: Police (previously), politician (now)
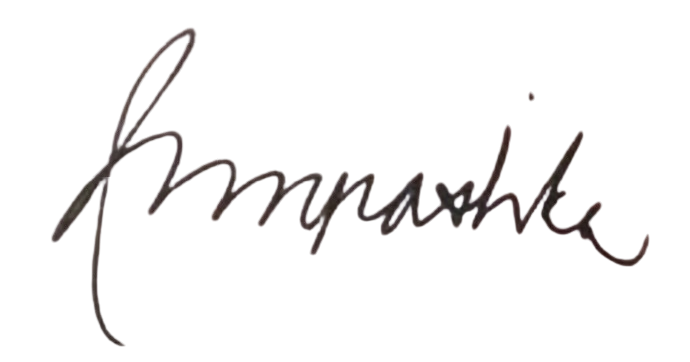
- Signature
- Police career
- Department: Investigation (Reserse)
- Branch: Indonesian National Police
- Service years: 1974–2007
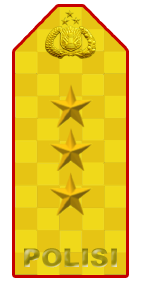
- Rank: Police Commissioner General

I Madé Mangku Pastika (Balinese: ᬇᬫᬤᬾᬫᬗ᭄ᬓᬸᬧᬲ᭄ᬢᬶᬓ; born 22 June 1951) is an Indonesian politician and retired national police commissioner general, who later served as the 7th governor of Bali from 2008 to 2018 and member of the Regional Representative Council (DPD) as senator for Bali in 2019. Pastika was formerly the Chief of Bali Provincial Police and Chairman of Indonesia's National Narcotics Agency. He served as chief investigator in the 2002 and 2005 Bali bombings.

Before becoming a politician Pastika had a long career in the police. As chief of the Papua Provincial Police Department, his first assignment was to investigate the murder of Theys Eluay, a respected local Papuan spokesman, which resulted in the conviction and sentencing of four Kopassus soldiers.

In October 2003, he was appointed as an Honorary Officer of the Order of Australia, "for service to Australia by heading the investigation into the bombings which occurred in Bali on 12 October 2002".

Pastika was elected to a second five-year term as Governor of Bali in May 2013. His second term ended on 29 August 2018, and he was briefly replaced by an acting official from the Ministry of Home Affairs before being succeeded by I Wayan Koster.

== Early life and career ==
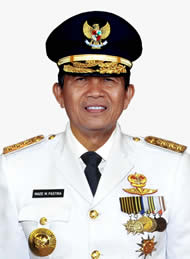
Pastika as a Governor of Bali

Pastika was born in the village of Patemon in Seririt District of the Buleleng Regency of Bali. He is the second son of six siblings (five boys and one girl). His father is an educator, dance teacher, and also a martial arts teacher. He has mastered six foreign languages and is a graduate of the Police Academy in 1974 or known as Praja Gupta.

=== 1951 ===
Pastika was born in Patemon village, Buleleng, Bali.

=== Educational background ===
- Graduated from Elementary School
- Graduated from SMP Negeri 1 Bengkulu
- Graduated from SMA Negeri 2 Palembang.

=== 1974 ===
- Graduated from the Police Academy AKABRI

=== 1975 ===
- Brimob/Pioneer training in Bogor.
- Assigned as Platoon Commander 1 Company I, Battalion B, Brimob Polda Metro Jaya.
- Assigned to East Timor (until 1976)

=== 1977 ===
- Married to Ni Made Ayu Putri

=== 1977–1981 ===
- Became an aide to the Minister of Defense and Security / Commander of the Indonesian Armed Forces, General TNI Maraden Panggabean.

=== 1984 ===
- Completed education at PTIK
- Head of the Heavy Theft Sub-Department, Directorate of Investigation, Polda Metro Jaya.

=== 1985 ===
- Head of Property Crime Unit, Directorate of Investigation, Jakarta Metropolitan Police.

=== 1987 ===
- Chief of Tambora Police, West Jakarta.

=== 1988–1989 ===
- Member of Garuda Contingent IX joined UN troops in Namibia.

=== 1990–1991 ===
- Continued education at the Army Staff Command School (SESKOAD).

=== 1991 ===
- Head of Banking Crime Investigation Unit, Sub Directorate of Investigation, Indonesian National Police Headquarters
- Head of Economic Investigation Section, South Sulawesi and Southeast Sulawesi Regional Police (until 1992)

=== 1992 ===
- Head of Banking Investigation Unit at National Police Headquarters, received training in England in crisis management.

=== 1993 ===
- Received training in Australia in serious crime management.

=== 1994–1995 ===
- Head of West Jakarta Police Resort
- Studied at the International Golden Institute (STIE - IGI Jakarta). Slipi Jakarta-West

=== 1996–1997 ===
- Deputy Assistant for Planning and Budget of the Jakarta Metro Police Chief
- studied at the ABRI Staff Command School (until 1997), the only Police Officer who studied at the ABRI SESKO, because Police Officers study on the Police education path (SESPIM and SESPATI).

=== 1997–1999 ===
- Head of the International Cooperation Department at NCB/Interpol
- Studied at the ABRI Staff Command School (graduated 1997) and studied International Criminal Investigation Science in Tokyo, Japan.
- Director of Economic Investigation of the National Police Headquarters
- Head of the Information Department of the National Police Headquarters
- Indonesian Police Corps (until 1999)

=== 1999 ===
- Director of Specific Crimes of the National Police Headquarters
- BKO Duties of the East Timor Regional Police

=== 2000 ===
- Interpol Secretariat of the National Police Headquarters
- Secretary of NCB-Interpol of the National Police Headquarters
- Director of Specific Crimes of the NCB/Interpol Secretary
- Chief of the East Nusa Tenggara Regional Police

=== 2000–2003 ===
- Chief of the Irian Jaya Regional Police
- Head of the Bali Bombing Investigation Team.

=== 2003–2005 ===
- Head of the Joint Bali Bombing Investigation Team
- Deputy Chief of the Criminal Investigation Agency of the National Police Headquarters
- Chief of the Bali Regional Police

=== 2005–2008 ===
- Daily Chief Executive of the National Narcotics Agency, his achievements include: Disclosure of the 3rd Largest Ecstasy Factory in the World located in Cikande, Tangerang-Banten.
- He has been inactive in his position at the National Narcotics Agency since April 1, 2008 to concentrate on his campaign for the nomination of Governor of Bali in the 2008 Bali gubernatorial election. Supported by PDI-Perjuangan, Pastika ran as a candidate for Governor of Bali paired with A.A.G.N Puspayoga and successfully won the election by gaining 55.04 percent of the vote.

=== 2008–2013 ===
- Governor of Bali (First term).
- During this period, Made Mangku Pastika sued Bali Post because he was considered to have provided false news regarding the conflict of traditional villages (pakraman) that occurred in Klungkung Regency. Based on the verdict of the Denpasar District Court judge, Bali Post was found guilty and sentenced to apologize to Mangku Pastika as the Governor of Bali openly in the local and national mass media for seven consecutive days.

=== 2013–2018 ===
- Governor of Bali (Second term)
- In the 2013 Bali gubernatorial election, I Made Mangku Pastika paired with I Ketut Sudikerta, Chairman of the Bali Golkar DPD, supported by the Golkar Party, the Democratic Party and other supporting parties, successfully defeated A.A.G.N Puspayoga who paired with Dewa Nyoman Sukrawan supported by the Indonesian Democratic Party of Struggle (PDI-P).

== Awards and honours ==
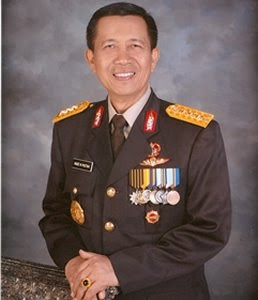
Mangku Pastika in 2013

During his time as a member of the Indonesian National Police (1974–2008) and Governor of Bali (2008–2018), he has received a number of Honours and Awards both at home and abroad, including;

1st Line	Main Mahaputra Star (August 13, 2012)		
2nd Line	Bhayangkara Pratama Star	Bhayangkara Nararya Star	Satyalancana Loyalty 24 Years
3rd Row	Satyalancana Ksatriya Tamtama	Satyalancana Karya Bhakti (Repeat I)	Satyalancana Seroja
4th Row	Satyalancana Santi Dharma	United Nations Transition Assistance Group (UNTAG) Medal	Honorary Officer of the Order of Australia (Civil Division) (A.O.) - Australia (11 October 2003)

Political offices
Preceded by Dewa Made Beratha	Governor of Bali; 2008–2018	Succeeded by I Wayan Koster
