= List of regencies and cities in Bali =

Here is the list of regencies (kabupaten) and cities in the province of Bali, Indonesia. There are 8 regencies and 1 city in the administrative division of the province of Bali.

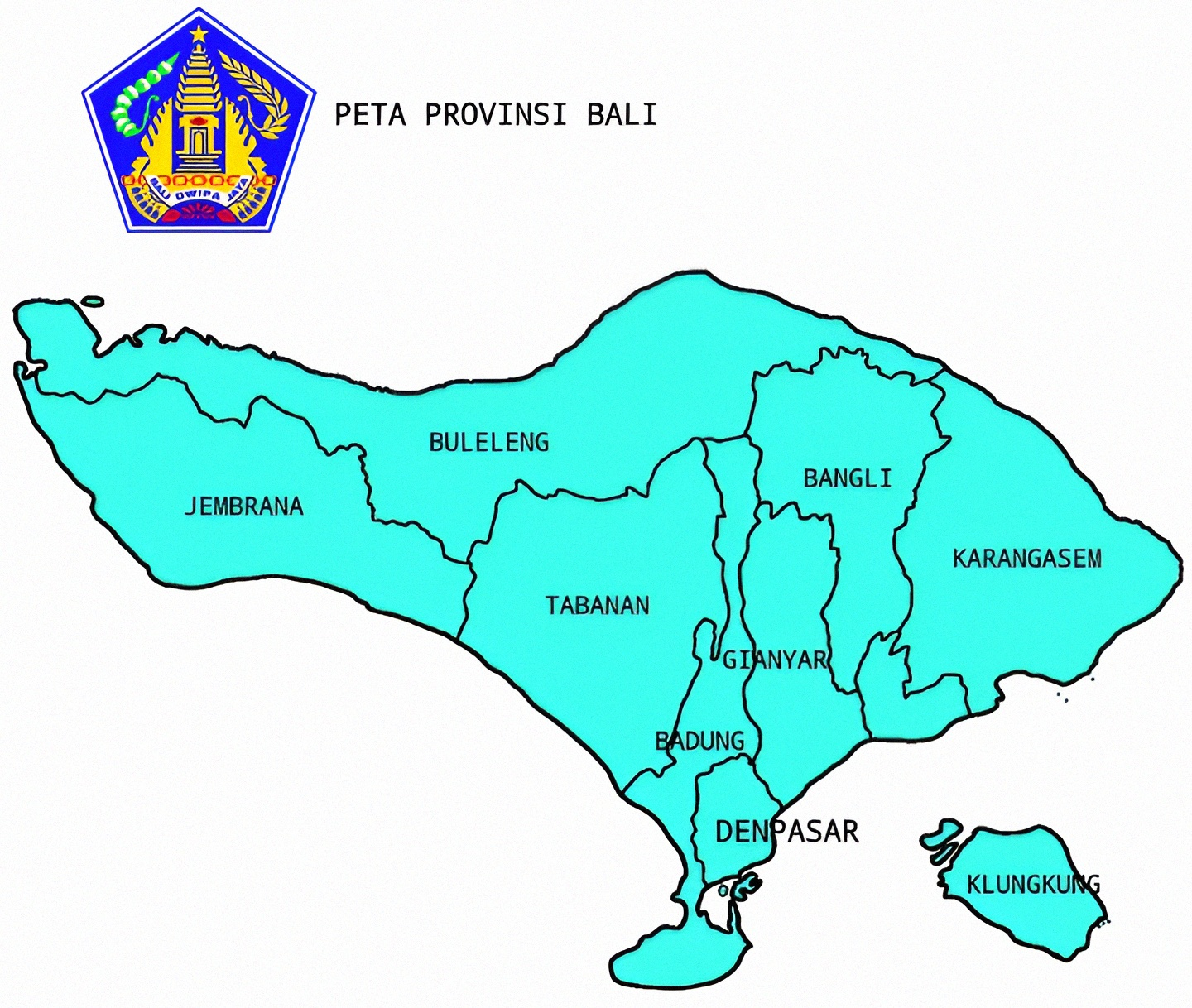
Map of regencies and city

No.	Regency/City	Capital	Area (km^{2}& sq mi)	Population (June 2022)	District	Subdistrict/village	Logo	Location map
1	Badung Regency	Mangupura	398.75 km^{2} (153.96 sq mi)	517,969	6	16/46		
2	Bangli Regency	Bangli	526.76 km^{2} (203.38 sq mi)	255,413	4	4/68		
3	Buleleng Regency	Singaraja	1,322.75 km^{2} (510.72 sq mi)	827,642	9	19/129		
4	Gianyar Regency	Gianyar	364.36 km^{2} (140.68 sq mi)	501,870	7	6/64		
5	Jembrana Regency	Negara	849.13 km^{2} (327.85 sq mi)	325,879	5	10/41		
6	Karangasem Regency	Amlapura	839.32 km^{2} (324.06 sq mi)	522,729	8	3/75		
7	Klungkung Regency	Semarapura	313.96 km^{2} (121.22 sq mi)	217,469	4	6/53		
8	Tabanan Regency	Singasana	849.31 km^{2} (327.92 sq mi)	465,086	10	-/133		
9	Denpasar City	-	125.87 km^{2} (48.60 sq mi)	653,136	4	16/27		
