= Dewa Made Beratha =

Indonesian politician, 7th Governor of Bali from 1998 to 2008

- ᬤᬾᬯᬫᬤᬾᬩᭂᬭᬝ
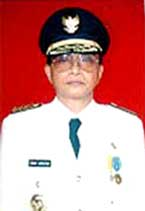
- Official portrait, 1998

6th Governor of Bali
- In office 27 August 1998 – 28 August 2008
- President: Suharto; B.J. Habibie; Abdurrahman Wahid; Megawati Sukarnoputri; Susilo Bambang Yudhoyono
- Vice Governor: I Gusti Bagus Alit Putra (1998—2003); I Gusti Ngurah Kesuma Kelakan (2003—2008)
- Preceded by: Ida Bagus Oka; Ahim Abdurahim (acting)
- Succeeded by: I Made Mangku Pastika

3rd Regent of Bangli
- In office 1968–1970
- Governor: Soekarmen
- Preceded by: Ida Bagus Made Sutha
- Succeeded by: Tjokorde Gde Ngurah

Personal details
- Born: 12 July 1941 (age 85) Gianyar, Bali, Dutch East Indies
- Party: PDI-P
- Other political affiliations: Golkar
- Spouse: I Gusti Agung Ayu Mas
- Education: Gadjah Mada University

Dewa Made Beratha (Balinese: ᬤᬾᬯᬫᬤᬾᬩᭂᬭᬝ; born 12 July 1941) is an Indonesian politician who is the 6th governor of Bali from 1998 to 2008. He is a member of the Indonesian Democratic Party of Struggle (PDI-P), and allied to Megawati Sukarnoputri. Beratha was the 3rd regent of Bangli Regency of Bali from 1968 to 1970.

In the 2008 Bali gubernatorial election, Beratha was replaced by I Made Mangku Pastika.

== Early life ==
He received his degree from Gajah Mada University in Social Politic Faculty.

== Work ==
He started his career in 1967 as Secretary Officer of Bangli Regency. From 1968 he was the Relieving Mayor of Bangli for another two years. He was a member of parliament and the Bali government from 1970 to 1998. In 1998, he was elected to his first term as Governor of Bali, and in 2003 he was elected for his second term.

== Elections ==
He was elected in 1998 Bali gubernatorial election to the governorship. In 2003 Bali gubernatorial election, he was elected for a second term.

== Personal life ==
=== Family ===
He is married to I Gusti Agung Ayu Mas and has four children: Dewa Gde Joni Asta Brata, Dewa Gde Juli Arta Brata, Desak Nyoman Anggreni, and Dewa Gde Darma Putra.

Political offices
Preceded by Ida Bagus Oka	Governor of Bali; 1998–2008	Succeeded by I Made Mangku Pastika
