= Anak Agung Gede Ngurah Puspayoga =

Indonesian politician (born 1965)

- ᬅᬦᬓ᭄ᬅᬕᬸᬂᬕᭂᬤᬾᬗᬸᬭᬄᬧᬸᬲ᭄ᬧᬬᭀᬕ
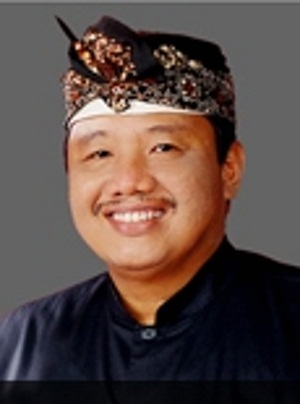
- Puspayoga in 2013

10th Minister of Cooperatives and Small & Medium Enterprises
- In office 27 October 2014 – 23 October 2019
- President: Joko Widodo
- Preceded by: Muhammad Lutfi (Acting)
- Succeeded by: Teten Masduki

7th Vice Governor of Bali
- In office 28 August 2008 – 28 August 2013
- President: Susilo Bambang Yudhoyono
- Governor: I Made Mangku Pastika
- Preceded by: I Gusti Ngurah Alit Kusuma Kelakan
- Succeeded by: I Ketut Sudikerta

3rd Mayor of Denpasar
- In office 2000 – 24 October 2008
- Governor: Dewa Made Beratha
- Preceded by: Komang Arsana
- Succeeded by: I.B. Rai Dharmawijaya Mantra

Personal details
- Born: 7 July 1965 (age 61) Denpasar, Bali, Indonesia
- Citizenship: Indonesian
- Party: PDI-P
- Spouse: I Gusti Ayu Bintang Darmawati
- Relations: I Gusti Ngurah Jaya Negara (brother in law)
- Children: 1
- Education: Ngurah Rai University
- Occupation: Politician
- Profession: Economist
- Cabinet: Working Cabinet

Anak Agung Gede Ngurah Puspayoga (Balinese: ᬅᬦᬓ᭄ᬅᬕᬸᬂᬕᭂᬤᬾᬗᬸᬭᬄᬧᬸᬲ᭄ᬧᬬᭀᬕ; born 7 July 1965) is an Indonesian politician and economist. He was the 10th Indonesia's Minister of Cooperatives and Small & Medium Enterprises under President Joko Widodo's Working Cabinet from 2014 to 2019. Previously, he served as the 4th Vice Governor of Bali from 2008 to 2013 and 3rd Mayor of Denpasar from 2000 to 2008.

== Early life and education ==
Anak Agung Gede Ngurah Puspayoga was born on 7 July 1965 in Denpasar, Bali. His father, Cok Sayoga, was a prominent PDI-P party figure in Bali, having a close relationship with the party's chairman, Megawati Sukarnoputri, since the 1980s. He obtained his bachelor's degree from Ngurah Rai University in 1991.

== Career ==
Puspayoga hold his first political office as the member of Bali's local parliament from PDI-P in 1999. He became the mayor of Denpasar the following year, a position which he would hold for eight years. In 2008, he won the Bali gubernatorial election, running along with I Made Mangku Pastika. He then served with Pastika as his deputy until 2013.

He ran for Bali's governor office in 2013, choosing Dewa Nyoman Sukriawan as his running mate. He subsequently lost the election to the incumbent governor and former superior, Pastika.

On 26 October 2014, the newly elected Indonesian President Joko Widodo named him as Minister of Cooperatives and Small & Medium Enterprises.

== Family ==
He is married to I Gusti Ayu Bintang Darmawati, who was appointed as Minister of Women Empowerment and Child Protection in 2019.
