= Regional regulation (Indonesia) =

Regulations by local governments in Indonesia

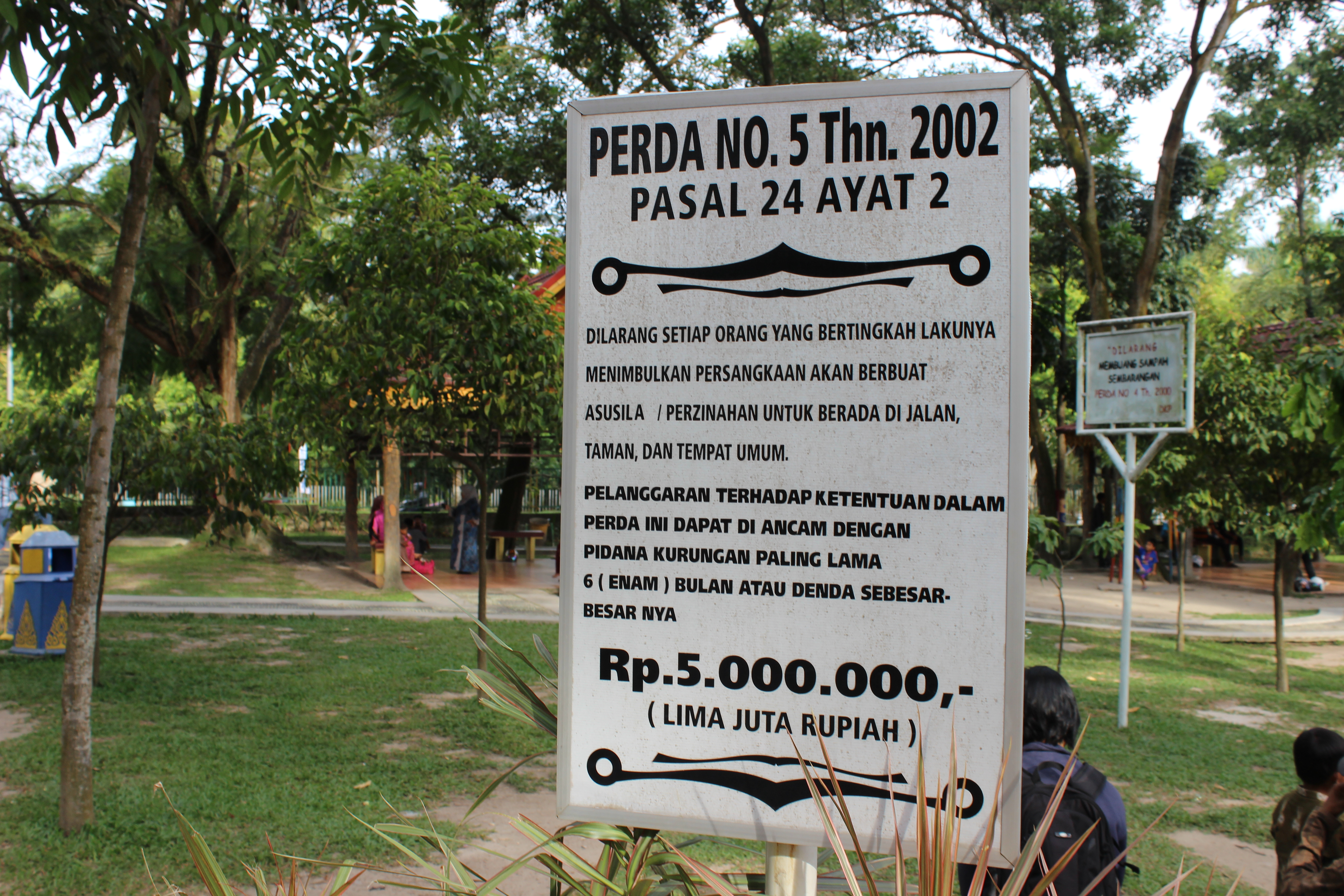
A local law in Pekanbaru, Indonesia

In Indonesia, a regional regulation (Indonesian: peraturan daerah, abbreviated perda) is a regulation that is passed by Indonesian local governments and carry the force of law in that region. There are two levels of regional regulations. Provinces pass provincial regulation (peraturan daerah provinsi), while the second tier subdivisions of Indonesia, known as regencies and cities pass regency regulation (peraturan daerah kabupaten) and city regulation (peraturan daerah kota), respectively. Each type of regional regulation is passed by the region's parliamentary body (DPRD) together with their chief executive (governor, regent or mayor, depending on region).

== History ==
As part of the post-Suharto reforms, Indonesia granted more power to local governments. This decentralization of power was largely governed by two laws passed in 1999 and 2004. Although, outside of Aceh, regional governments are not allowed to enact regulations based on religious affairs and are not allowed to enact religious criminal laws. As lieu of legislation laws related to religious affairs are only mandated through the appointed Indonesian ministry of religious affairs from the central government that is only related to personal status issues, not by local governments. These laws authorized the local governments and legislatures to pass regional regulations that carry the force of law, as long as they do not conflict with laws or regulations that are higher in the hierarchy of laws.

== Position in the hierarchy of laws ==
According to Indonesian Law No 12 of 2011, regional regulations occupy the lowest positions in Indonesia's hierarchy of laws. Provincial regulations are subordinate to, in order, the Constitution, Decree of People's Consultative Assembly (Ketetapan MPR), Law (Undang-Undang) or Government Regulation In Lieu of Law (Peraturan Pemerintah Pengganti Undang-Undang or Perppu), Government Regulation, and Presidential Regulation. Regency and City regulations occupy the lowest position, right beneath provincial regulations.

This Law No 12 of 2011 have been amended with Law No 15 of 2019.

== Regional variations ==
The provinces of Aceh and Papua refer to their regional regulations with special names. In Aceh, they are known as qanun (from an Arabic word meaning "law" or "rules") while Papua uses the name "special regional regulation" (Indonesian: peraturan daerah khusus or perdasus). Additionally, in Aceh qanuns are also used to enact provisions of Islamic criminal law.

== Notable regional regulations ==
The province of Aceh passed a series of qanuns enforcing some provisions of Islamic law, including Islamic criminal law. The latest, passed in 2014 and went into effect in 2015, criminalizes the consumption and production of liquor, gambling, being alone with someone of the opposite sex who is not a spouse or a relative (this violation is called khalwat), committing intimacy outside marriage (ikhtilath), fornication (zina), rape, falsely accusing someone of conducting fornication (qadzaf), sodomy, and lesbian acts (musahaqah). The penalty for violations includes caning, fines, and imprisonment. The human rights groups Amnesty International and Human Rights Watch criticized this regulation, citing its use of caning as a punishment, as well as the criminalization of consensual sex outside marriage.

The province Bali, which is also an island and a popular tourist destination, has a regional regulation limiting building height in the entire island. Buildings in Bali cannot exceed 15 metres, exceptions are generally given to public facilities. The height limit is based on the height of coconut trees. In 2017, Trump Entertainment Resorts's plans for a new hotel with a tower, met with objections, including over the possible violation of the height restriction regulations.

== See also ==
- Law of Indonesia
- Subdivisions of Indonesia
