= Ngerebong =

Hindu tradition in Kesiman, Denspar

Ngerebong is in the village of Kesiman, Denpasar. Many people assemble there for the gathering of the God. Ngerebong is also the name of a tradition that is held by the Hindu people in Pura Pangrebongan, located in Ngerebong. This tradition is usually done every six months in the Bali calendar, which is on the Sunday or Pon Redite wuku Medangsia. Usually the streets are closed when the tradition is being carried out, because people believe this tradition is a sacred tradition. The Ngerebong community ceremony begins with prayers in the temple.
