= Denpasar =

Capital and largest city of Bali, Indonesia

- City
- City of Denpasar; Kota Denpasar

Native transcription(s)
  - Balinese: ᬓᭀᬢᬤᬾᬦ᭄ᬧᬲᬃ Kota Dénpasar
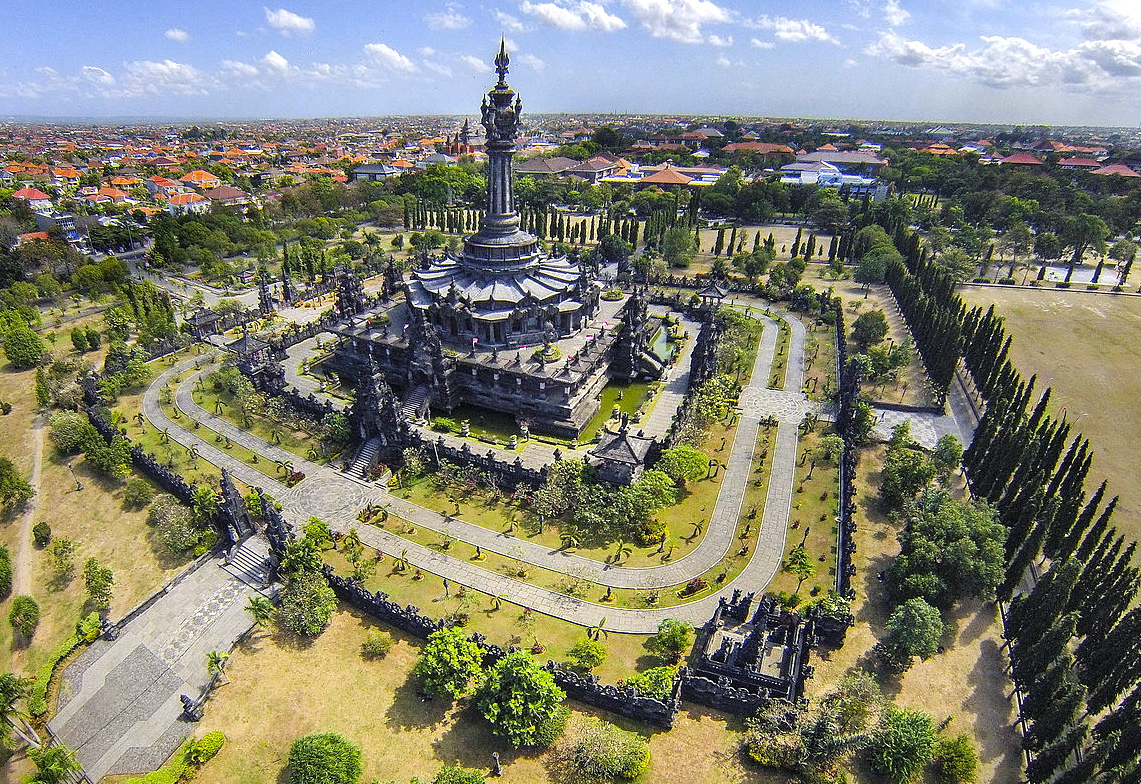
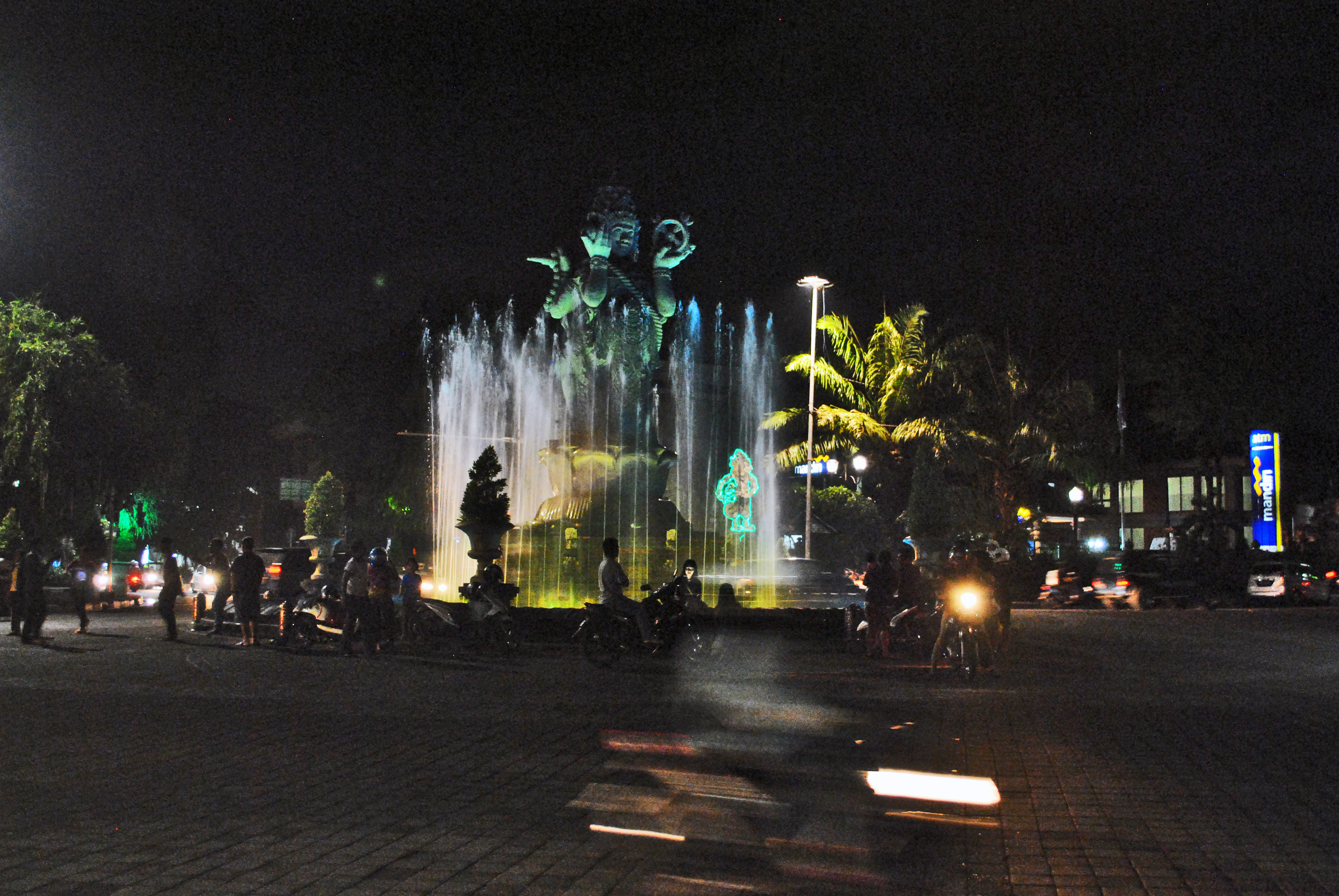
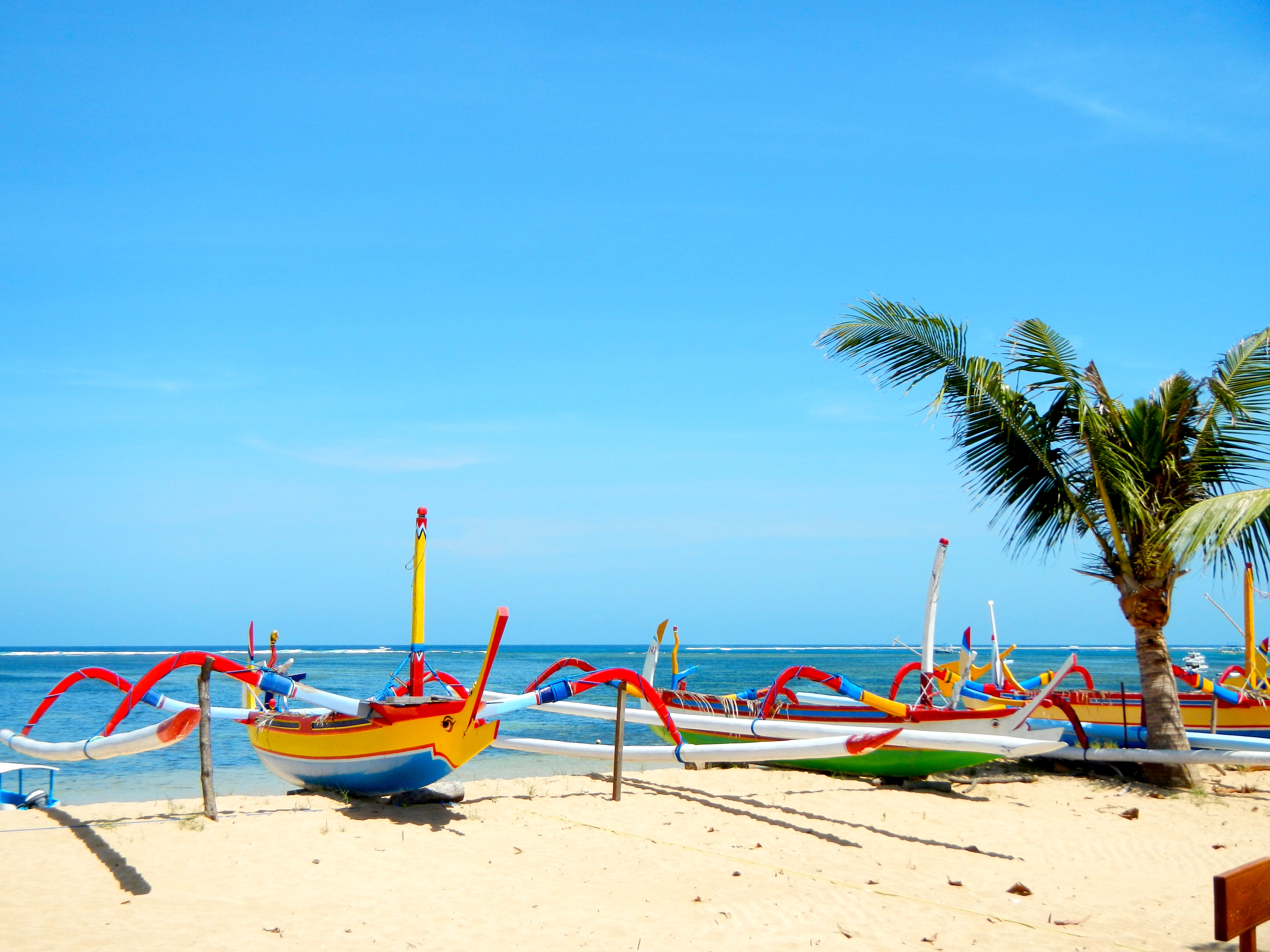
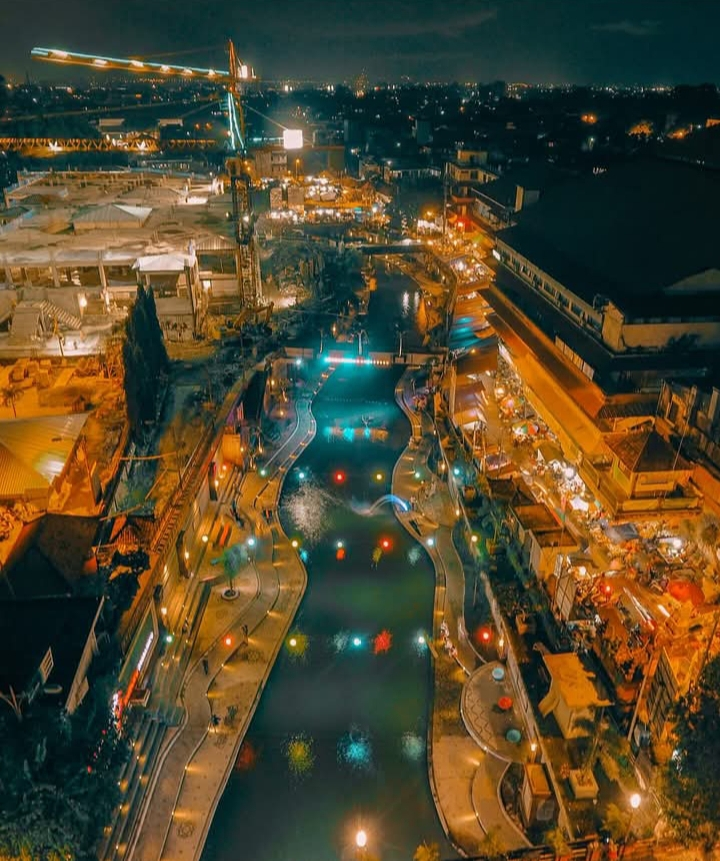
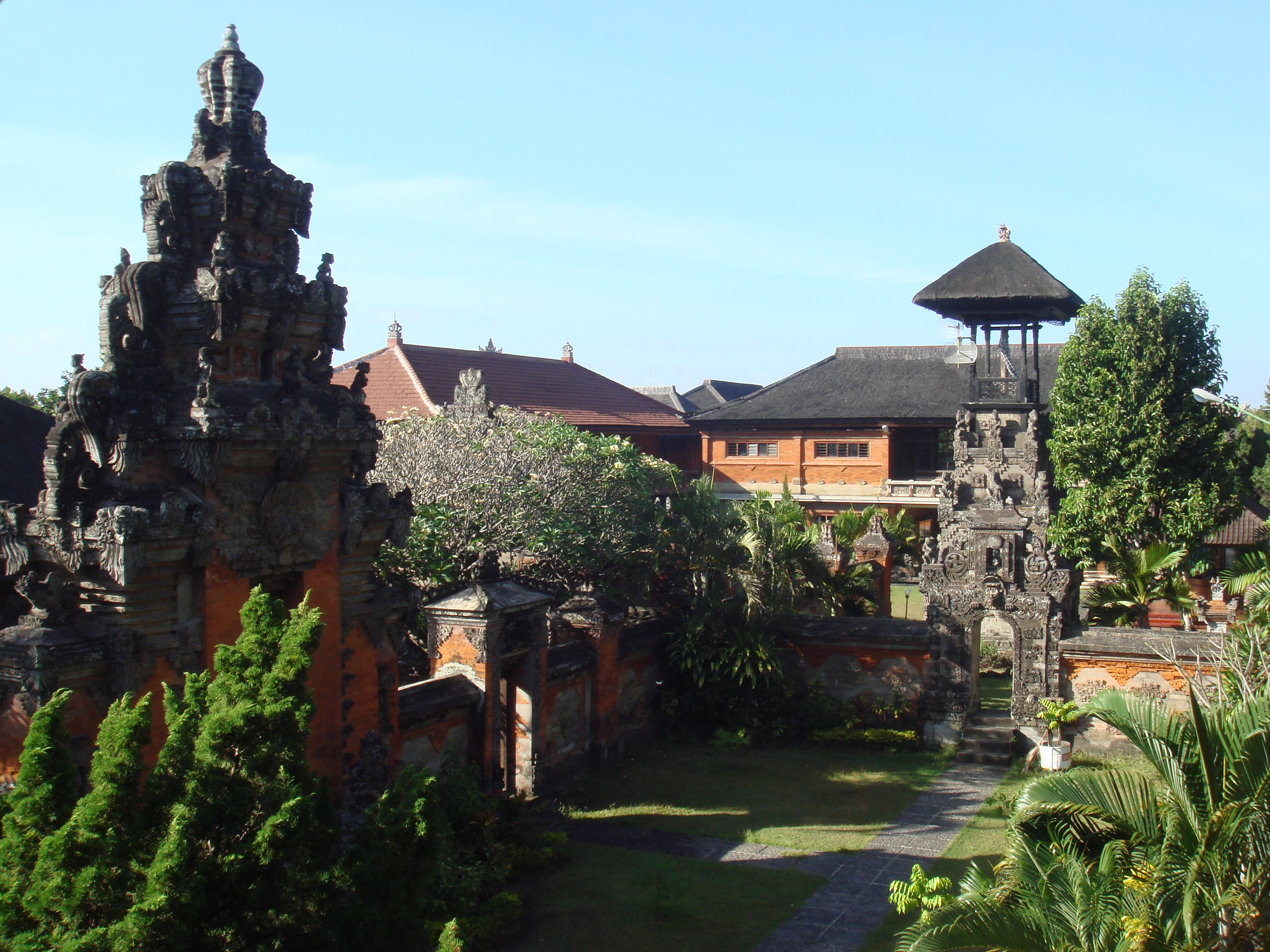
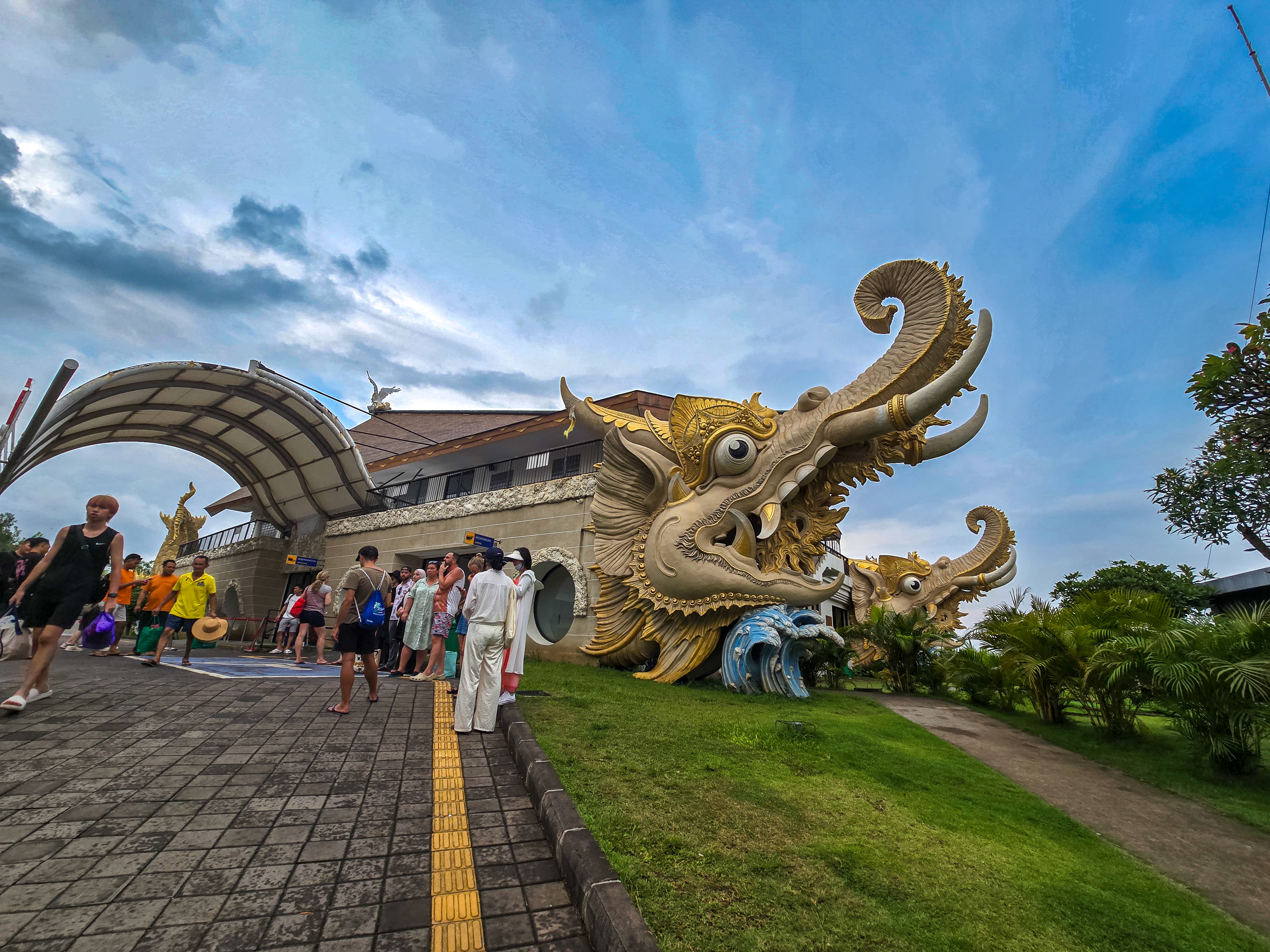
- Bajra Sandhi Monument Catur Muka Statue at Night Sanur Beach Kumbasari Park at Night Bali Museum Sanur Harbor

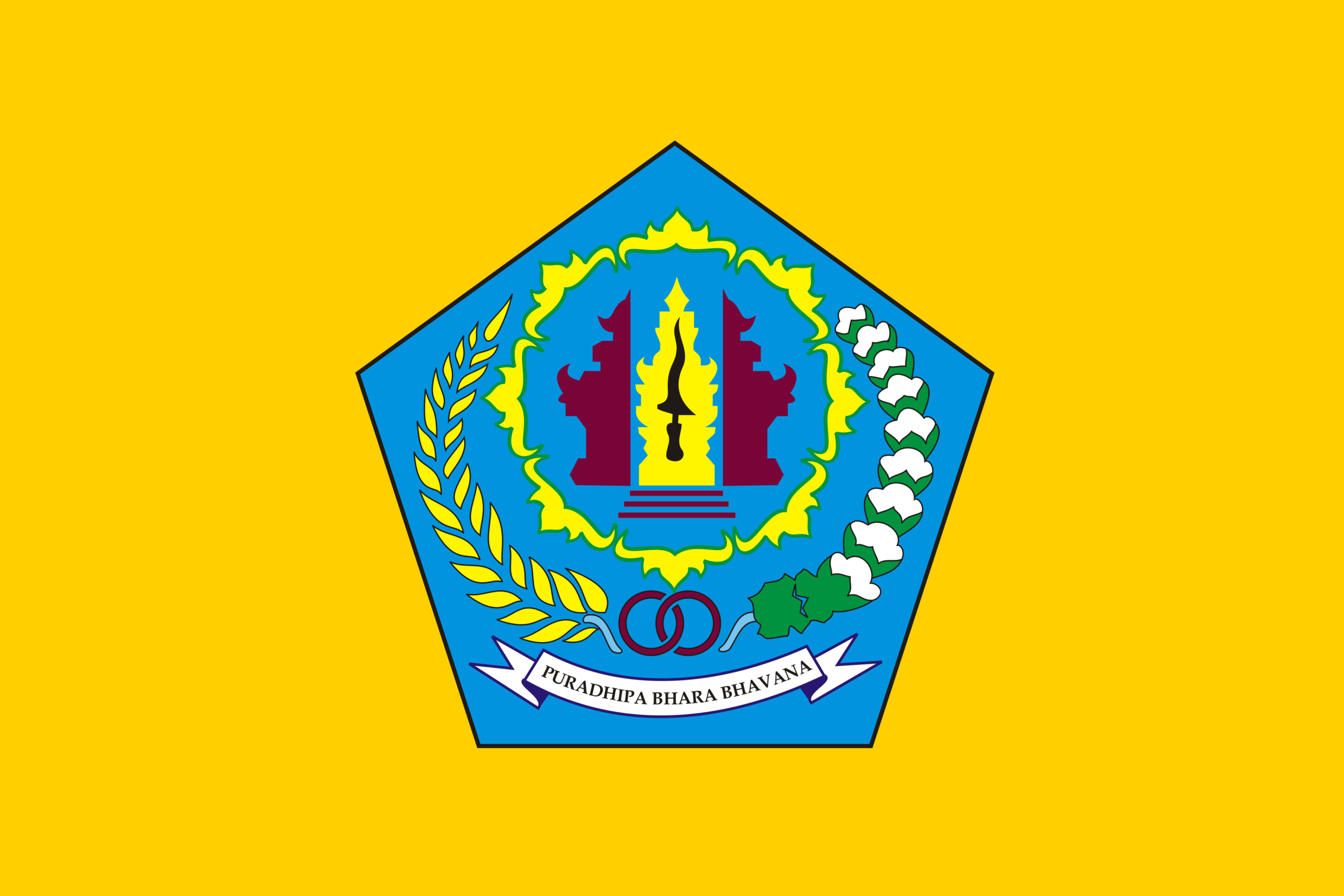
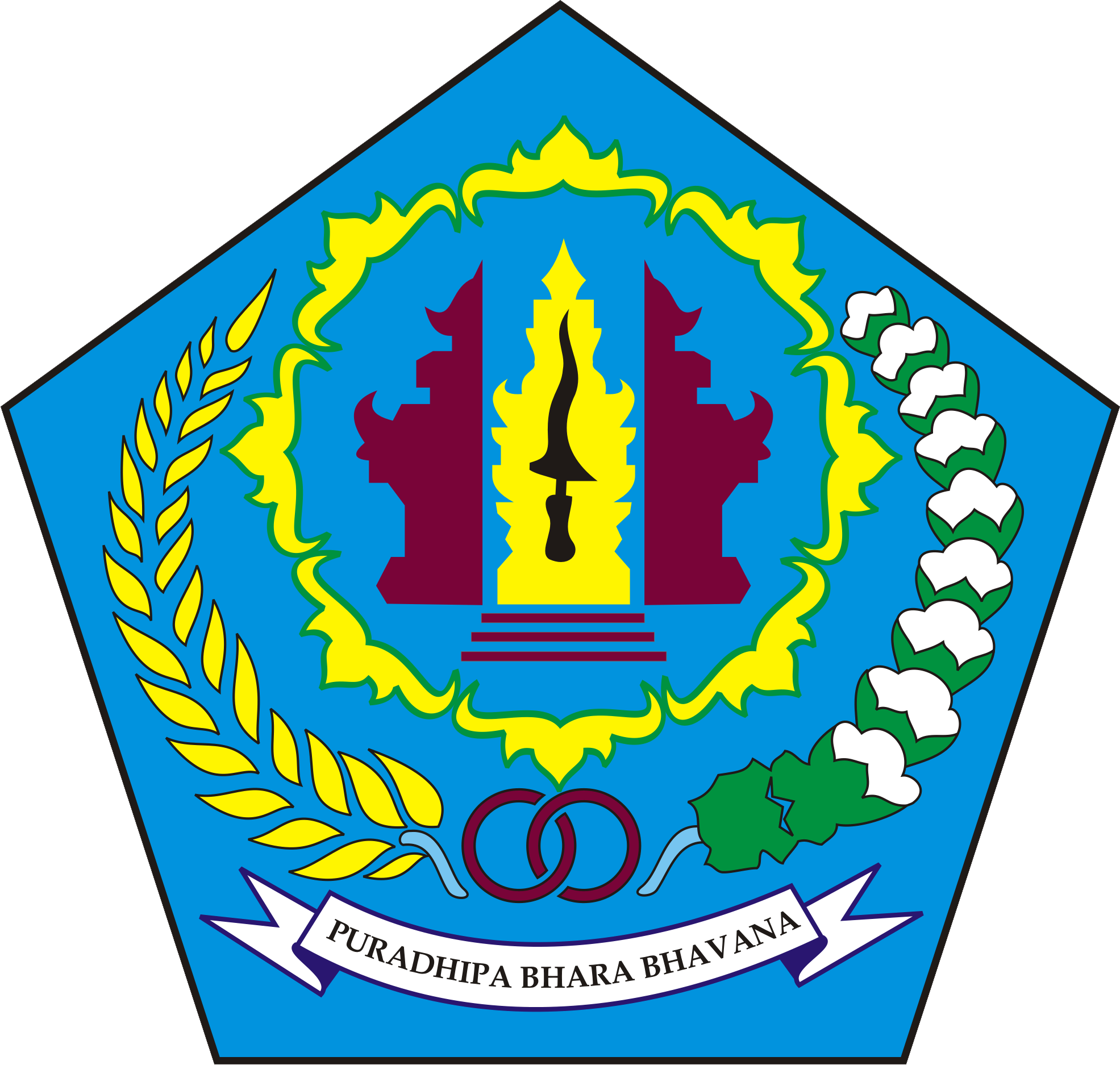
- Flag Coat of arms
- Nicknames: Kota Seribu Pura "City of a Thousand Temples"; Parijs van Bally "Paris of Bali"
- Motto: Purādhipa Bhāra Bhāvanā (Sanskrit).ᬧᬸᬭᬵᬟᬶᬧᬪᬵᬭᬪᬵᬯ᬴ᬦᬵ "The Capital Supports The Country"
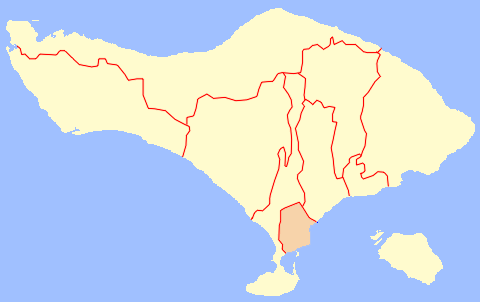
- Location within Bali, Indonesia
- Interactive map of Denpasar
- Location in Bali Location in Lesser Sunda Islands Location in Indonesia
- Coordinates: 8°40′18″S 115°14′02″E
- Country: Indonesia
- Province: Bali
- Metropolitan area: Sarbagita
- Districts: List: West Denpasar; East Denpasar; South Denpasar; North Denpasar
- Settled: 27 February 1788
- Founder: I Gusti Ngurah Madé Pemecutan

Government
  - Type: Mayor–council
  - Body: Denpasar City Government
  - Mayor: I.G.N. Jaya Negara (PDI-P)
  - Vice Mayor: I Kadék Agus Arya Wibawa
  - Legislature: Denpasar City Regional House of Representatives (DPRD)

Area
  - City: 125.98 km^{2} (48.64 sq mi)
  - Metro: 1,928.28 km^{2} (744.51 sq mi)

Population (2024)
  - City: 670,210
  - Rank: 24th
  - Density: 5,320.0/km^{2} (13,779/sq mi)
  - Urban: 1,326,000 (11th)
  - Metro: 2,005,950 (8th)
  - Metro density: 1,040.28/km^{2} (2,694.31/sq mi)
- Demonym: Denpasarese

Nominal GDP (nominal, 2023)
  - Total: Rp 60.100 trillion US$ 3.943 billion
  - Per capita: Rp 80.305 million US$ 5,269
- Time zone: UTC+8 (Indonesia Central Time)
- Area code: (+62) 361
- ISO 3166 code: ID-BA-DP
- Vehicle registration: DK
- HDI (2024): ▲0.852 (7th) – very high
- Website: denpasarkota.go.id

Denpasar (Indonesian pronunciation: [denˈpasar]; Balinese: ᬤᬾᬦ᭄ᬧᬲᬃ, Dénpasar) is the capital and the largest city of the province of Bali, Indonesia. Denpasar is the largest city in the Lesser Sunda Islands and the second largest city in Eastern Indonesia after Makassar. It is bordered by Badung Regency to its west and north, Gianyar Regency to its east, and the Indian Ocean and the Badung Strait to its south. The growth of the tourism industry on the island of Bali has pushed the city of Denpasar to become a center of business activities, and has positioned the city as an area with high per capita income and growth in Bali. The population of the city at the end of 2024 was 670,210.

Denpasar is the main gateway to the Bali island, the city is also a hub for other cities in the Lesser Sunda Islands.

With the rapid growth of the tourism industry in Bali, Denpasar has encouraged and promoted business activities and ventures, contributing to it having the highest growth rate in Bali Province. The population of Denpasar was 725,314 at the 2020 Census, down from 788,445 at the 2010 Census due to pandemic outflow; the official estimate as of the end of 2024 was 670,210. The Denpasar metropolitan area centred on Denpasar (called Sarbagita) had 2,187,198 residents in end 2024. The COVID-19 pandemic and travel related closures has further exacerbated the population loss.

== Etymology ==
The name Denpasar – from the Balinese words "dén", meaning north, and "pasar", meaning market – indicates the city's origins as a market-town on the site of what is now Kumbasari Market (formerly "Peken Payuk"), in the northern part of the modern city.

== History ==
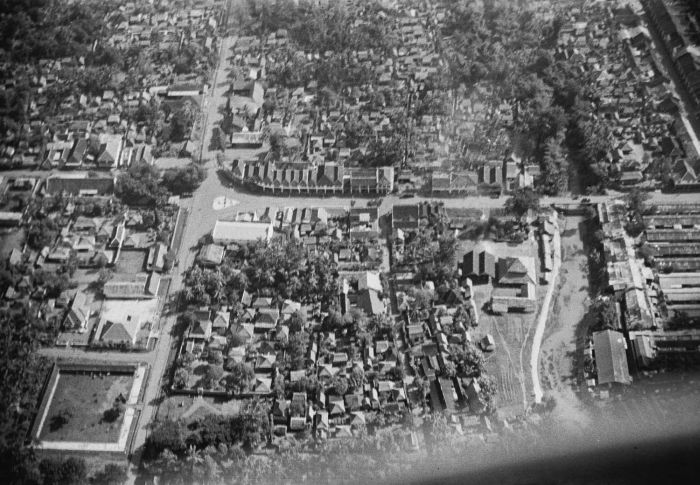
Denpasar, c. 1944

=== Founder ===
The city of Denpasar was founded by I Gusti Ngurah Made Pemecutan who was a descendant of Puri Pemecutan of Badung. The name Denpasar emerged when the area which was previously known as the Badung region was led by two sub-kingdoms in Badung, namely Puri Pemecutan and Puri Jambe Ksatrya. According to the researcher of the history of Denpasar City who is also a professor of history at the Faculty of Letters, Udayana University, AA Bagus Wirawan, at that time there were two palaces which indicated the existence of two governments, namely Puri Alang Badung and Puri Pemecutan.

=== Colonial era ===
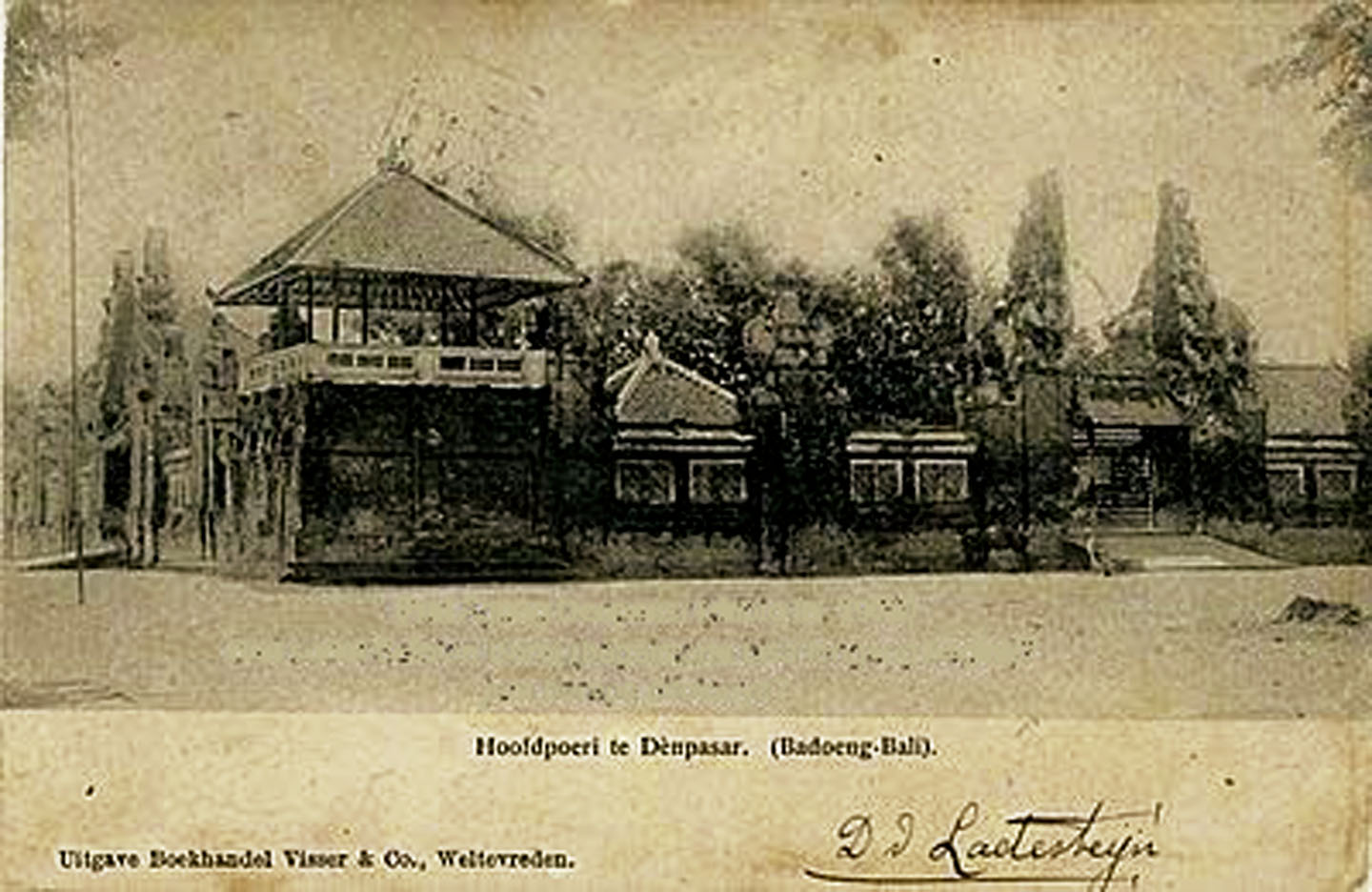
Photo of the Main Gate of the Puri Agung Denpasar Palace before the Dutch intervention in Bali (1906)

In the 18th and 19th centuries, Denpasar functioned as the capital of the Hindu Majapahit Kingdom of Badung, thus the city's former name being Badung. The royal palace was looted and razed during the Dutch intervention in 1906. A statue in Taman Puputan (Denpasar's central square) commemorates the 1906 Puputan, in which as many as a thousand Balinese, including the King and his court, committed mass suicide in front of invading Dutch troops, rather than surrender to them.

Tuban Airfield, now part of Denpasar International Airport, opened in 1931. It was seized by the Imperial Japanese forces in 1942 during World War II.

=== Independence era ===
In 1958, Denpasar became the seat of government for the province of Bali. It remained the administrative centre of both Badung Regency and the City of Denpasar.

Both Denpasar and Badung Regency have experienced rapid physical, economic, social, and cultural growth. Denpasar has become not only the seat of government, but also the centre of commerce, education, industry, and tourism.

With an average population growth of 4.05% per annum, accompanied by rapid development, came a variety of urban problems. It was later resolved that meeting the needs and demands of the burgeoning urban community would be best addressed by giving Denpasar administrative independence from Badung Regency.

An agreement was reached to raise the status of Denpasar to that of an autonomous city and on 15 January 1992, Act No. 1 of 1992 officially established the City of Denpasar. It was inaugurated by the Minister of Home Affairs on 27 February 1992.

On 16 November 2009, in a further administrative realignment, Regulation Number 67 shifted the capital of Badung Regency from Denpasar to Mangupura.

== Geography ==
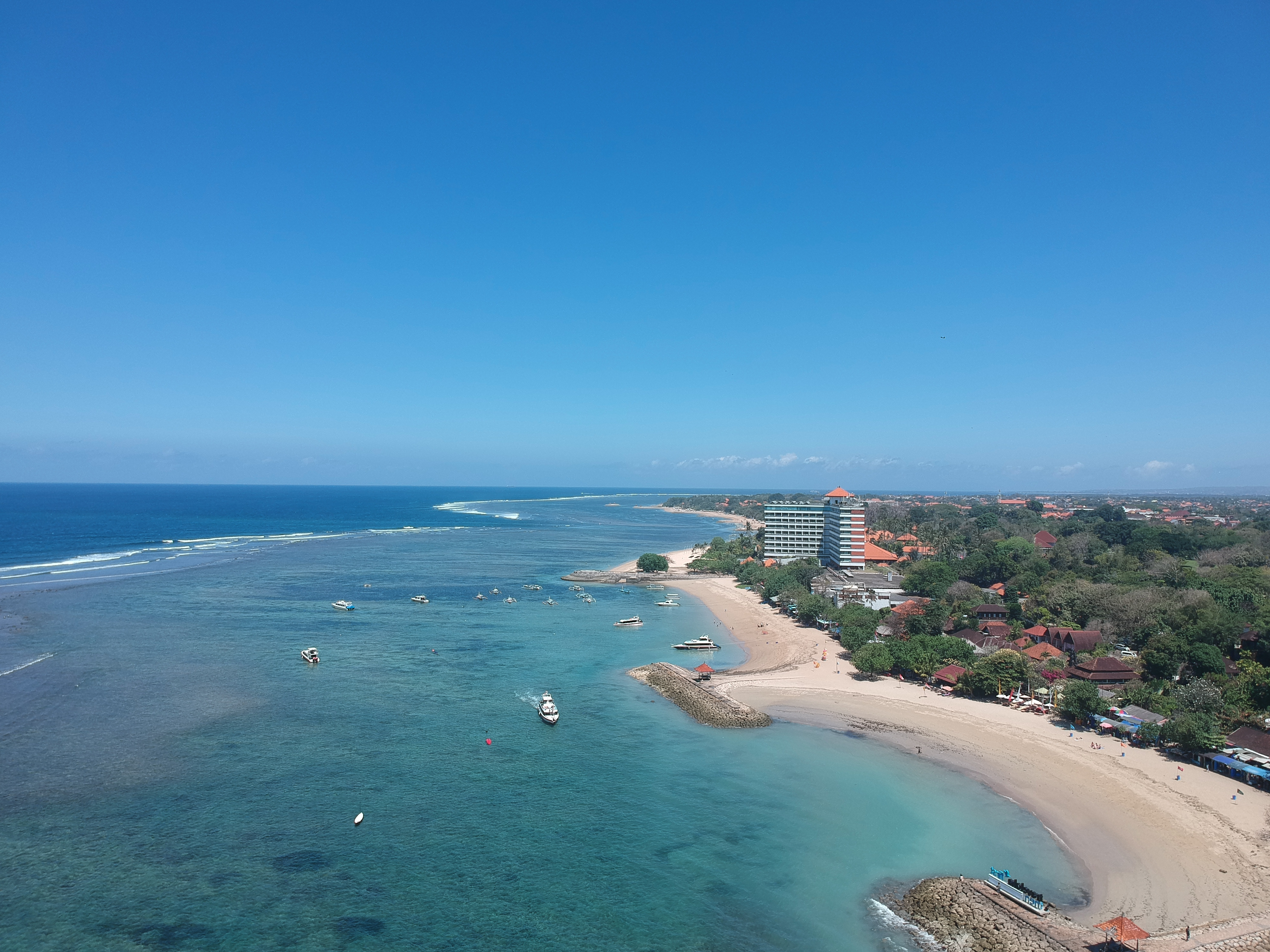
Sanur beach from above

Denpasar is a coastal city with island and bays, islets, and peninsulas, located southern part of Bali Island, eastern part of Indian Ocean. The Lombok Strait separates Bali and Lombok.

Denpasar is located at an elevation of 4 m (13 ft) above sea level. While the total area of 125.98 km^{2} or 2.18% of the total area of Bali Province. From the use of land, 2,768 hectares of land are paddy, 10,001 hectares are dry land, while the remaining land area is 9 hectares.

Badung River divides Denpasar, after which the river empties into the Gulf of Benoa.

=== Climate ===
Denpasar, located just south of the equator, has a tropical savanna climate (Köppen climate classification: Aw) and is under the influence of the Australian monsoon system. Daytime temperatures typically range from 20 °C to 33 °C throughout the year. Between December and March, the West monsoon may bring heavy rain and high humidity, though days are generally sunny, with rain falling mainly at night and clearing quickly. From June to September, humidity is low, and evenings can be mild.

Climate data for Denpasar (Ngurah Rai International Airport) (1991–2020 normals, extremes 1999–2023)
Month	Jan	Feb	Mar	Apr	May	Jun	Jul	Aug	Sep	Oct	Nov	Dec	Year
Mean daily maximum °C (°F)	30.9 (87.6)	30.9 (87.6)	31.0 (87.8)	31.0 (87.8)	30.5 (86.9)	29.8 (85.6)	29.0 (84.2)	29.1 (84.4)	30.0 (86.0)	31.0 (87.8)	31.6 (88.9)	30.8 (87.4)	30.5 (86.8)
Daily mean °C (°F)	27.9 (82.2)	27.9 (82.2)	28.0 (82.4)	28.1 (82.6)	27.7 (81.9)	27.1 (80.8)	26.5 (79.7)	26.2 (79.2)	26.7 (80.1)	27.6 (81.7)	28.1 (82.6)	27.9 (82.2)	27.5 (81.5)
Mean daily minimum °C (°F)	25.1 (77.2)	25.0 (77.0)	25.0 (77.0)	25.1 (77.2)	24.9 (76.8)	24.6 (76.3)	24.1 (75.4)	23.8 (74.8)	23.8 (74.8)	24.6 (76.3)	25.3 (77.5)	25.3 (77.5)	24.7 (76.5)
Average precipitation mm (inches)	388.4 (15.29)	298.7 (11.76)	213.9 (8.42)	114.5 (4.51)	72.8 (2.87)	50.8 (2.00)	29.7 (1.17)	16.1 (0.63)	40.7 (1.60)	67.9 (2.67)	149.4 (5.88)	299.3 (11.78)	1,742.2 (68.58)
Average precipitation days	18.8	16.5	13.3	8.8	6.5	4.7	3.3	1.9	2.8	4.8	10.3	15.9	107.6
Mean monthly sunshine hours	197.0	190.4	222.1	237.9	264.6	239.8	262.6	277.4	269.6	281.1	246.4	186.2	2,875.1
Source 1: Starlings Roost Weather
Source 2: FAO (humidity 1961–1990)

== Demographics ==
=== Population ===
Year	1990	2000	2003	2010	2024
Total population	320,597	532,440	585,150	788,589	670,210
Population history of Denpasar City; Source:

The city's population was counted as 788,445 in 2010, up from 533,252 in the previous decade. The official estimate as of end-2024 was 670,210.

Denpasar's population grew about 4% per year in the period from 2000 to 2010, Denpasar grew much faster from 2005 to 2010 than in the previous five years. The lingering effects of the 2002 Bali bombings had a major depressive effect on tourism, jobs, and immigration from other islands. If current trends had continued, Denpasar had been expected to easily surpass a million residents by the next census in 2020. The 2015 intercensal survey (SUPAS) claimed a population of 879,098 people for the city, but the 2020 Census demonstrated that the population had fallen to 725,314. There were some 7,098 more men than women in Denpasar in mid-2022.

In relation to being a tourist city, then Denpasar is also supported by several areas such as Kuta and Ubud. This area is often referred to as Sarbagi (Denpasar, Badung and Gianyar) or Sarbagita (Denpasar Badung, Gianyar and Tabanan) or simply Denpasar metropolitan area based on Presidential Regulation No. 45 of 2011. The following are the populations of several of these areas:

Administrative Division	Area (km^{2})	Density (/km^{2})	Population (Ministry of Home Affairs 2024)
Denpasar	125.90	5,323.35	670,210
Badung	398.70	1,335.59	532,500
Gianyar	364.40	1,393.37	507,746
Sarbagi	889.00	8,052.31	1,710,456
Tabanan	849.30	561.01	476,742
Sarbagita	1,738.30	8,613.32	2,187,198

=== Ethnic groups ===
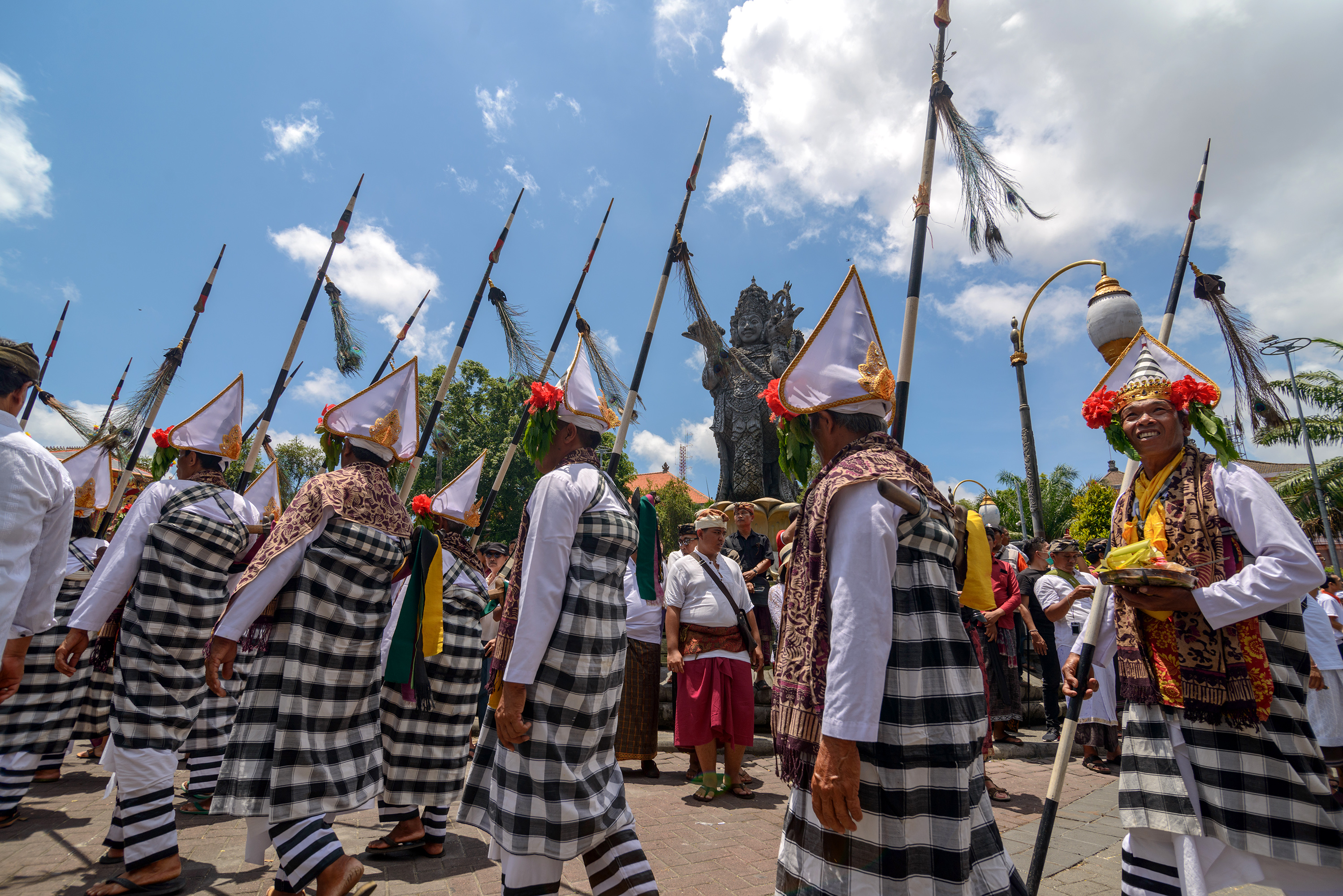
Baris dance, a Balinese war dance in Denpasar.

Bali Province is home to the Balinese and Bali Aga tribes ethnic, as is the case in this city. As the capital city of Bali province, Denpasar is inhabited by people from various ethnic groups and more than other regions in Bali. Based on data from Central Bureau of Statistics in 2010 Indonesian Population Census, as many as 516,708 people or 65.52% of the 788,589 people of the city of Denpasar are of the Balinese ethnic group. Denpasar residents from other ethnic, many come from the Javanese ethnic, and some others are Chinese, Sasak, Madura, Sunda, Flores, Malays, Bugis, Batak, and several other ethnic groups.

The following is the population of Denpasar city based on ethnicity in 2010:

No.	Ethnic groups	Pop. (2010)	Pct. (%)
1	Balinese	516,708	65.52%
2	Javanese	203,325	25.78%
3	Chinese	8,900	1.13%
4	Sasak	8,300	1.05%
5	Madurese	6,186	0.78%
6	Sundanese	5,547	0.70%
7	Flores	4,187	0.53%
8	Bugis	1,605	0.20%
9	Malays	1,275	0.16%
10	Others	32,552	4.13%
	Denpasar City	788,589	100%

=== Religion ===
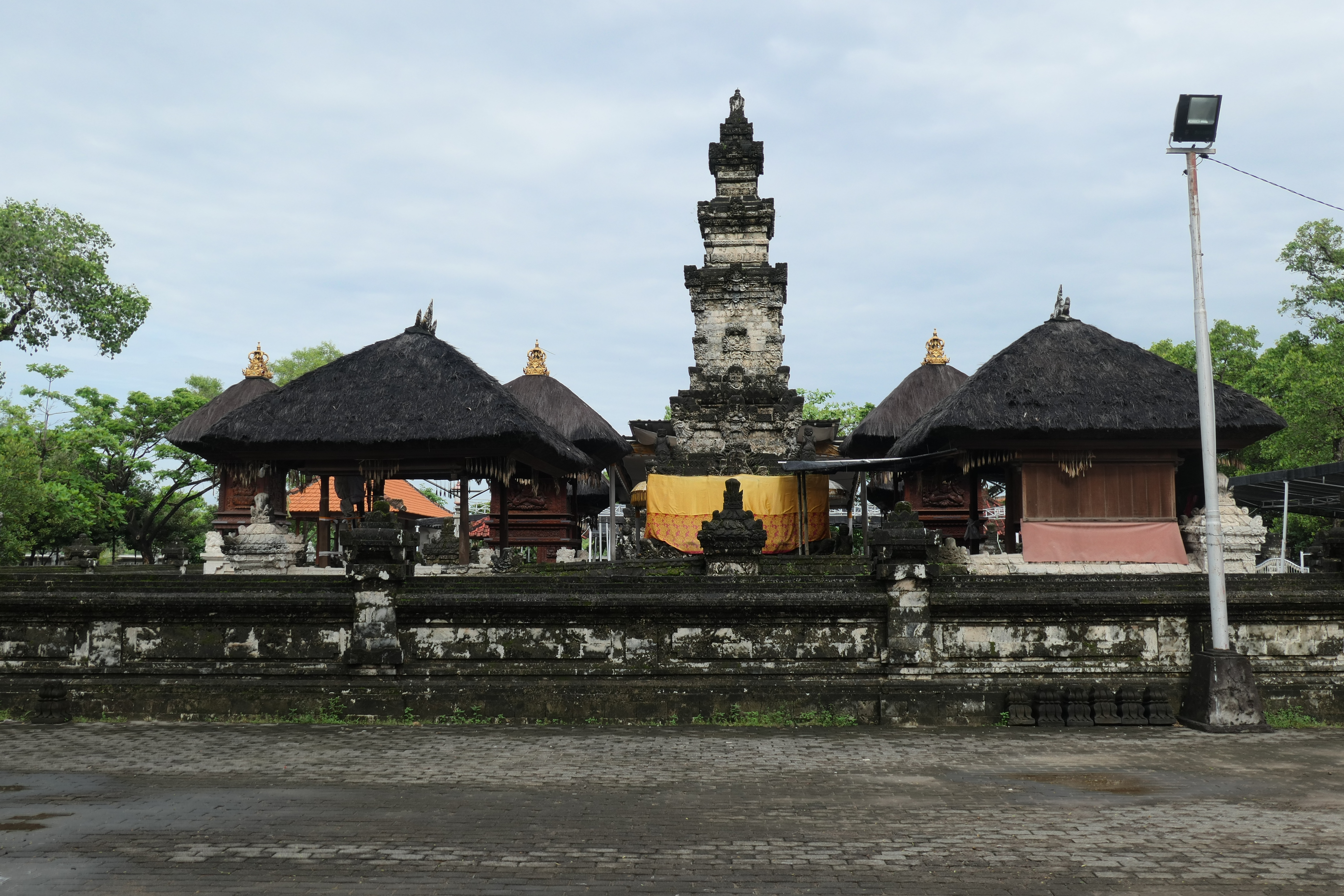
Pura Dalem Sakenan a popular Balinese temple in Denpasar.

The religions practiced by the people of Denpasar are very diverse with the majority being Hindu. The Balinese people are generally Hindu, with some are Muslims, Christians and Buddhists. Meanwhile, the Javanese, Malays, Bugis, Sundanese, Sasak people are generally Muslims with some Hindu, Buddhist and Christian. Some people from Flores, and the Batak are Christian. The Chinese are generally Buddhists and Confucians.

As of 2024 approximately 67.50% of the population are Hindus, while Muslims is the largest minority religion (22.50%), followed by Christians, Buddhists, and Confucianists.

== Government and politics ==
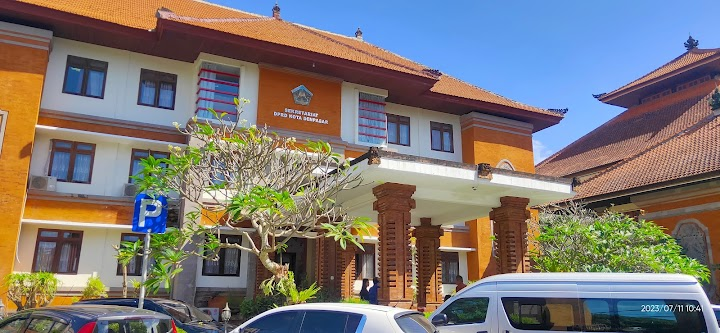
Denpasar's parliament (DPRD) Building, located in North Denpasar.

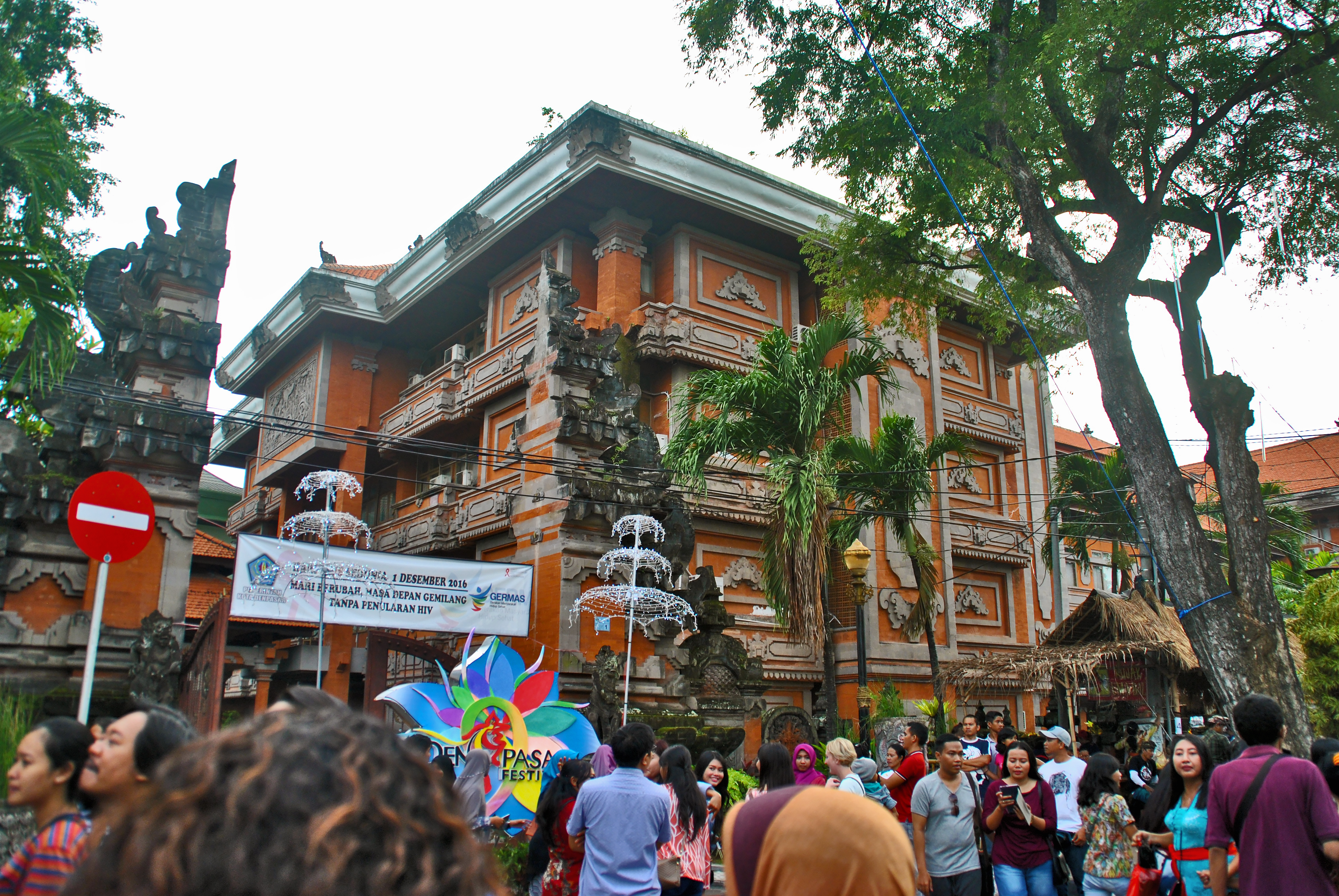
Denpasar Mayor's Office, located in West Denpasar.

The mayor of Denpasar is the highest officeholder in the Denpasar city government. Currently, the mayor serving in Denpasar City is I Gusti Ngurah Jaya Negara, with the vice mayor held by I Kadek Agus Arya Wibawa. They are candidate of the Indonesian Democratic Party of Struggle (PDI-P) which was won in the 2020 general election and again in 2024. They have served as mayor and vice mayor since 26 February 2021.

The Denpasar City Regional House of Representatives, the municipal legislature, has 45 members, with the Indonesian Democratic Party of Struggle won the most of seats and currently ruling the city's government with his alliance.

=== Administrative divisions ===
Administratively, the city government consists of four districts (kecamatan), subdivided into 43 villages. Denpasar has developed numerous measures to improve public services.

=== Districts ===
Map of districts (kecamatan) of Denpasar

Denpasar City comprises 4 districts (kecamatan), subdivided into 16 urban villages (kelurahan) and 27 rural villages (desa), for a total amount of 43 villages. In mid 2022, the population was officially estimated at 726,808 (comprising 366,953 males and 359,855 females) with its area being 125.98 km² and its density 5,769 people/km^{2}.

List of districts and villages in Denpasar City as follows:

Code	Districts	Urban villages	Rural villages	Total villages	Status	List
51.71.03	West Denpasar	3	8	11	Desa	Dauh Puri Kangin; Dauh Puri Kauh; Dauh Puri Klod; Padang Sambian Kaja; Padang Sambian Klod; Pemecutan Klod; Tegal Harum; Tegal Kerta
51.71.03	West Denpasar	3	8	11	Kelurahan	Dauh Puri; Padang Sambian; Pemecutan
51.71.01	South Denpasar	6	4	10	Desa	Pemogan; Sanur Kaja; Sanur Kauh; Sidakarya
51.71.01	South Denpasar	6	4	10	Kelurahan	Panjer; Pedungan; Renon; Sanur; Serangan; Sesetan
51.71.02	East Denpasar	4	7	11	Desa	Dangin Puri Klod; Kesiman Kertalangu; Kesiman Petilan; Penatih Dangin Puri; Sumerta Kaja; Sumerta Kauh; Sumerta Klod/Kelod
51.71.02	East Denpasar	4	7	11	Kelurahan	Dangin Puri; Kesiman; Penatih; Sumerta
51.71.04	North Denpasar	3	8	11	Desa	Dangin Puri Kaja; Dangin Puri Kangin; Dangin Puri Kauh; Dauh Puri Kaja; Peguyangan Kaja; Peguyangan Kangin; Pemecutan Kaja; Ubung Kaja
51.71.04	North Denpasar	3	8	11	Kelurahan	Peguyangan; Tonja; Ubung
	TOTAL	16	27	43		

Denpasar is divided into four districts (kecamatan), listed below with their officially estimated 2022 populations:

- Denpasar Selatan (South Denpasar) 217,548
- Denpasar Timur (East Denpasar) 128,540
- Denpasar Barat (West Denpasar) 207,384
- Denpasar Utara (North Denpasar) 173,336

=== Greater Denpasar ===
Greater Denpasar spills out into the tourist regions, including Kuta and Ubud. The continuous built-up area includes nearly all of Badung Regency (except Petang District), most of Gianyar Regency (except for Payangan, Tegallalang, and Tampaksiring Districts), and part of Tabanan Regency (Kediri and Tabanan Districts only). It is known as Sarbagita, a clipped compound of Denpasar, Badung, Gianyar, and Tabanan, made official by Presidential Regulation Number 45 of 2011, despite Tabanan just beginning to succumb to urban sprawl. See also List of metropolitan areas in Indonesia.

Administrative division	Area (in km^{2})	Pop'n 2010 Census	Pop'n 2020 Census	Pop'n mid 2022 Estimate	Pop'n density (per km^{2})
Denpasar Municipality	125.98	788,445	725,314	726,808	5,769.2
Badung Regency (part ^{(a)})	303.52	517,089	517,178	516,400	1,701.4
Gianyar Regency (part ^{(b)})	187.69	332,470	367,080	373,700	1,991.0
Tabanan Regency (part ^{(c)})	105.00	154,741	166,726	168,900	1,608.6
Denpasar; Metropolitan Area (Sarbagita)	722.19	1,792,745	1,776,298	1,785,800	2,472.6

Notes: (a) Kuta Selatan, Kuta, Kuta Utara, Mengwi and Abiansemal Districts. (b) Sukawati, Blahbatuh, Ubud and Gianyar Districts. (c) Kediri and Tabanan Districts.

== Economy ==
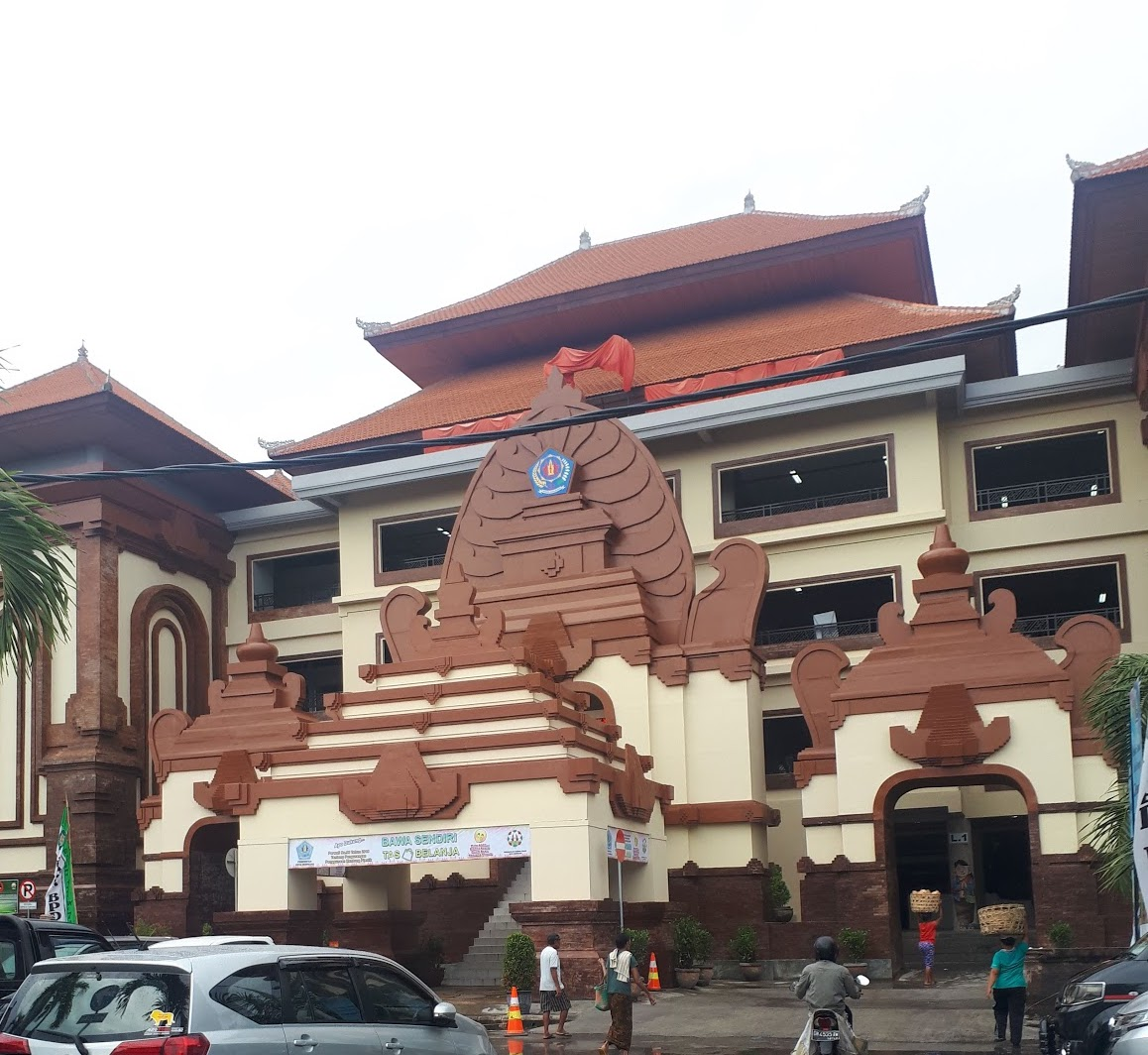
Badung Market in Denpasar.

The development of tourism and structural changes in the economy have had a strong impact on Denpasar. Trade, hotels, and restaurants dominate the city's gross regional domestic product.

Also boosting the economy of Denpasar is the production of craft items such as souvenir carvings and sculptures. The craft industry, however, is experiencing pressure due to the impact of the global financial crises and competition from other Asian developing countries such as Vietnam, Thailand, India, Malaysia, and China. These competitor countries maximize the scale of production by using industrial technology, while at Denpasar the craft industry remains focused on traditional skills and hand-made goods, limiting the quantity of production.

Surveys conducted by a team led by EcoVerde Global Consulting on the live bats trade in Bali showed an ongoing long-term trade of large fruit bats for traditional medicine in Denpasar. Hundreds of animals are being offered for sale with higher numbers per capita in economically less affluent areas

== Architecture ==
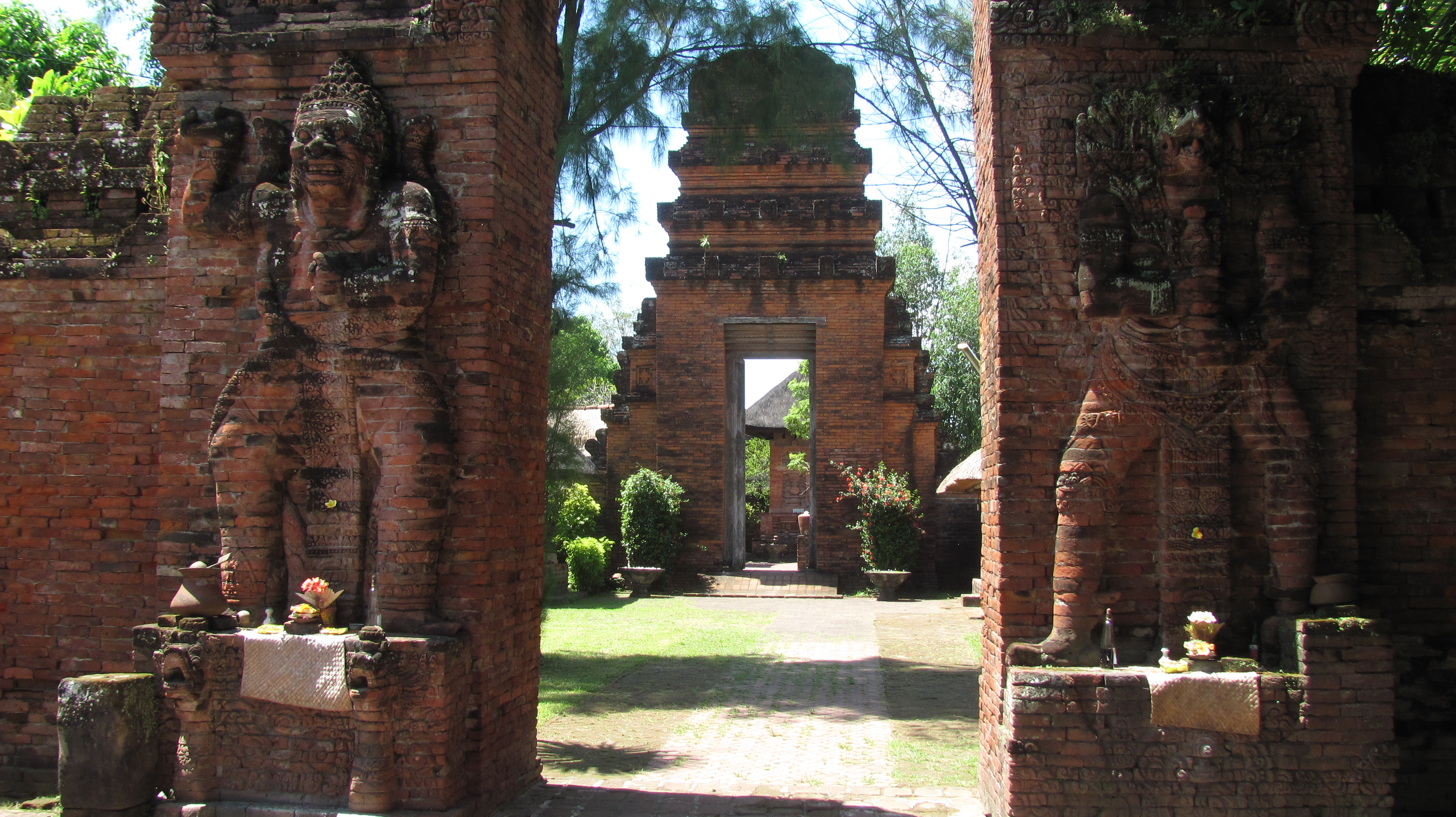
A candi bentar on the Hindu Maospahit Temple

Bali was once known for its mud walls and thatched gates but gated residential developments and shop houses now characterize urban Bali.

During the late 19th century, the built environment was being constructed based on the political situation of the city. This resulted in the residence of the ruling family becoming the centre of the city.

Market squares played an important role in the Badung kingdom, and it continued to do so when the colonial powers came to exert control over Bali. Over the 20th century, Denpasar faced the challenges of changing urban landscapes brought about by political changes. The developments that were brought about by the colonial powers were regarded as eroding the indigenous culture of Bali. Although Denpasar became known as a 'settler city', there was still a strong attachment to the indigenous culture.

Denpasar has undergone massive unplanned development during the 21st century, due to the expansion of tourism leading to the construction of increasingly more modern facilities in the heart of the city. Nonetheless, the market square still plays an important role, with its façade representing traditional elements of the Balinese culture.

== Tourism ==
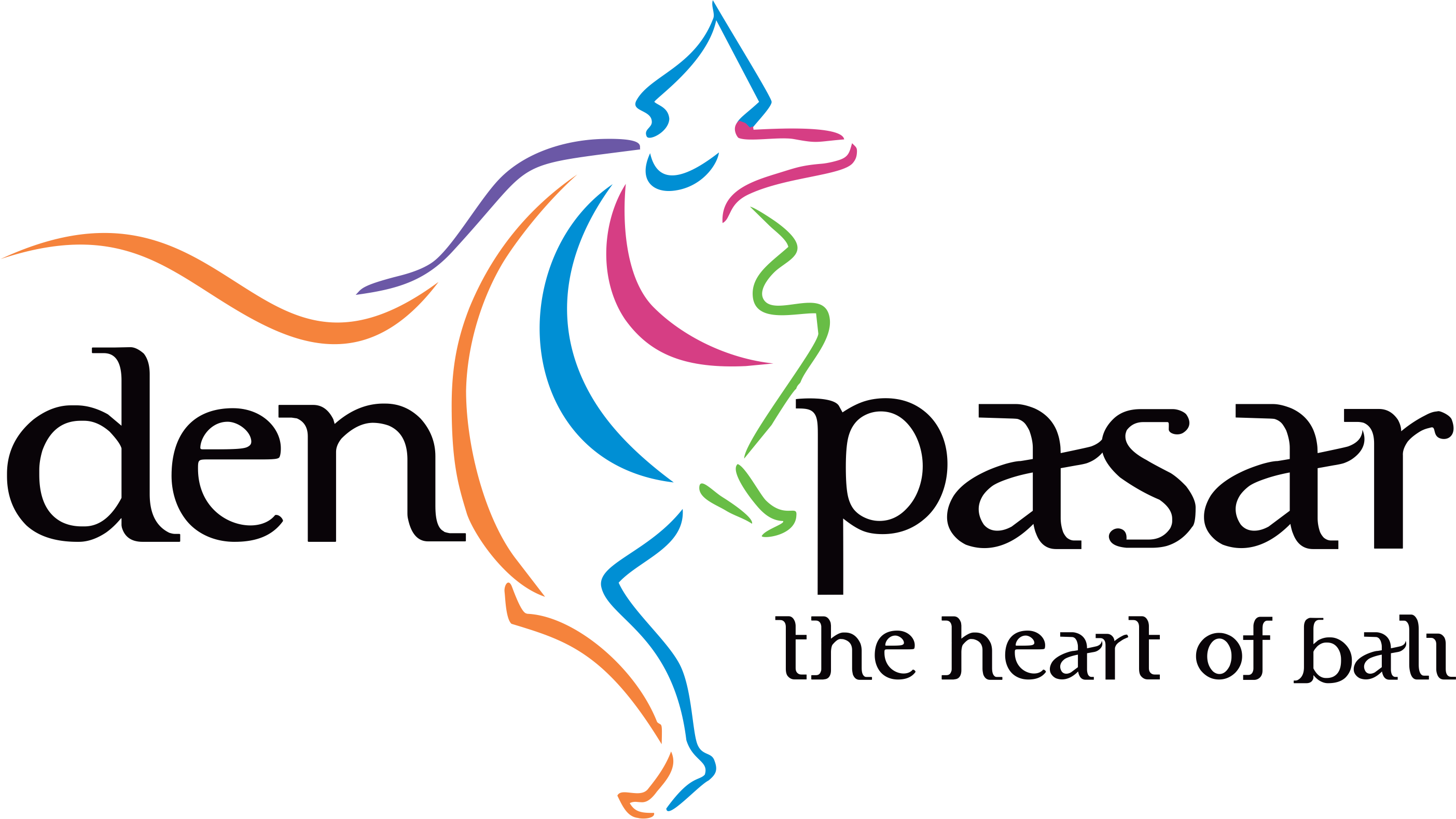
Denpasar City Tourism Branding Logo

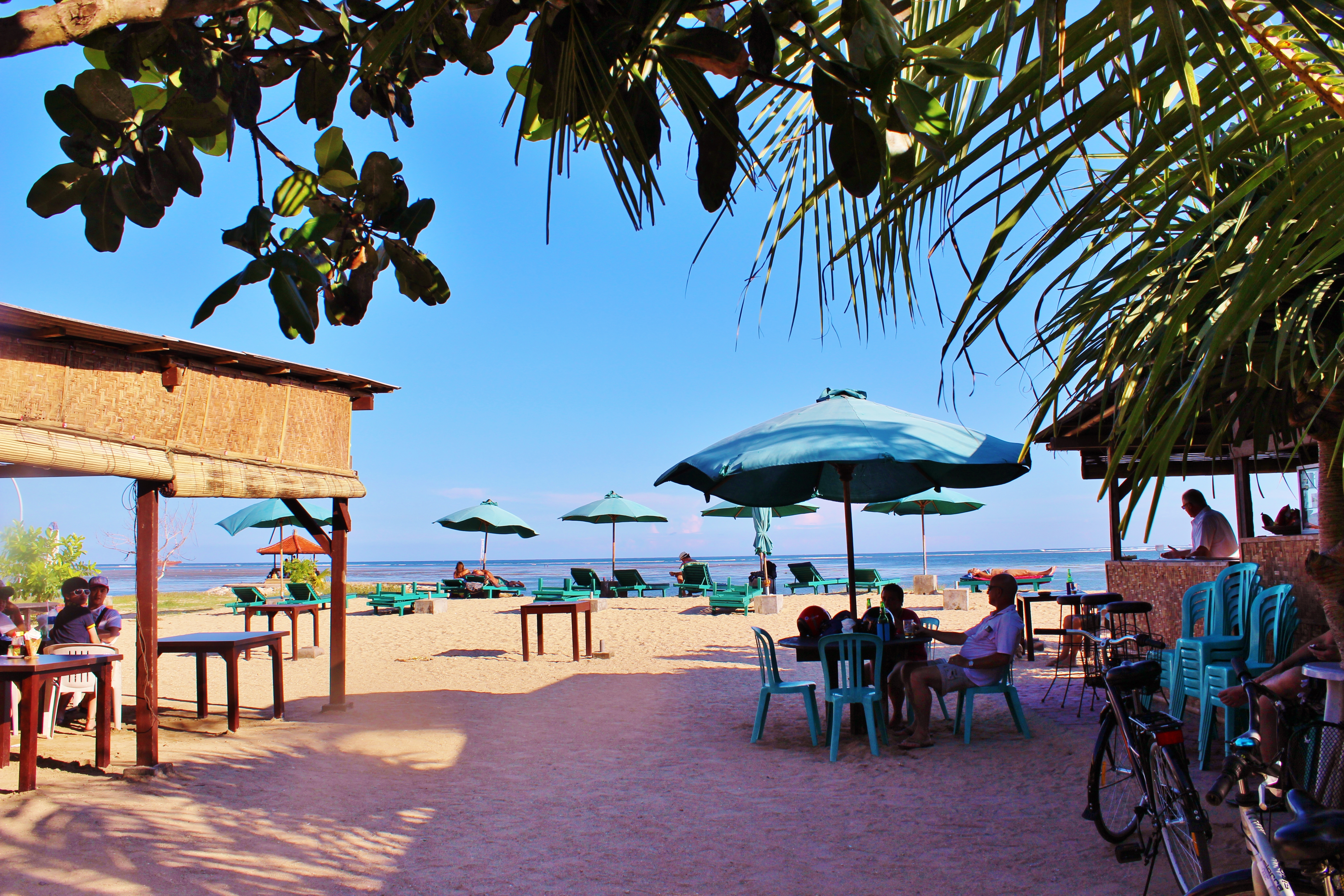
Sanur Beach

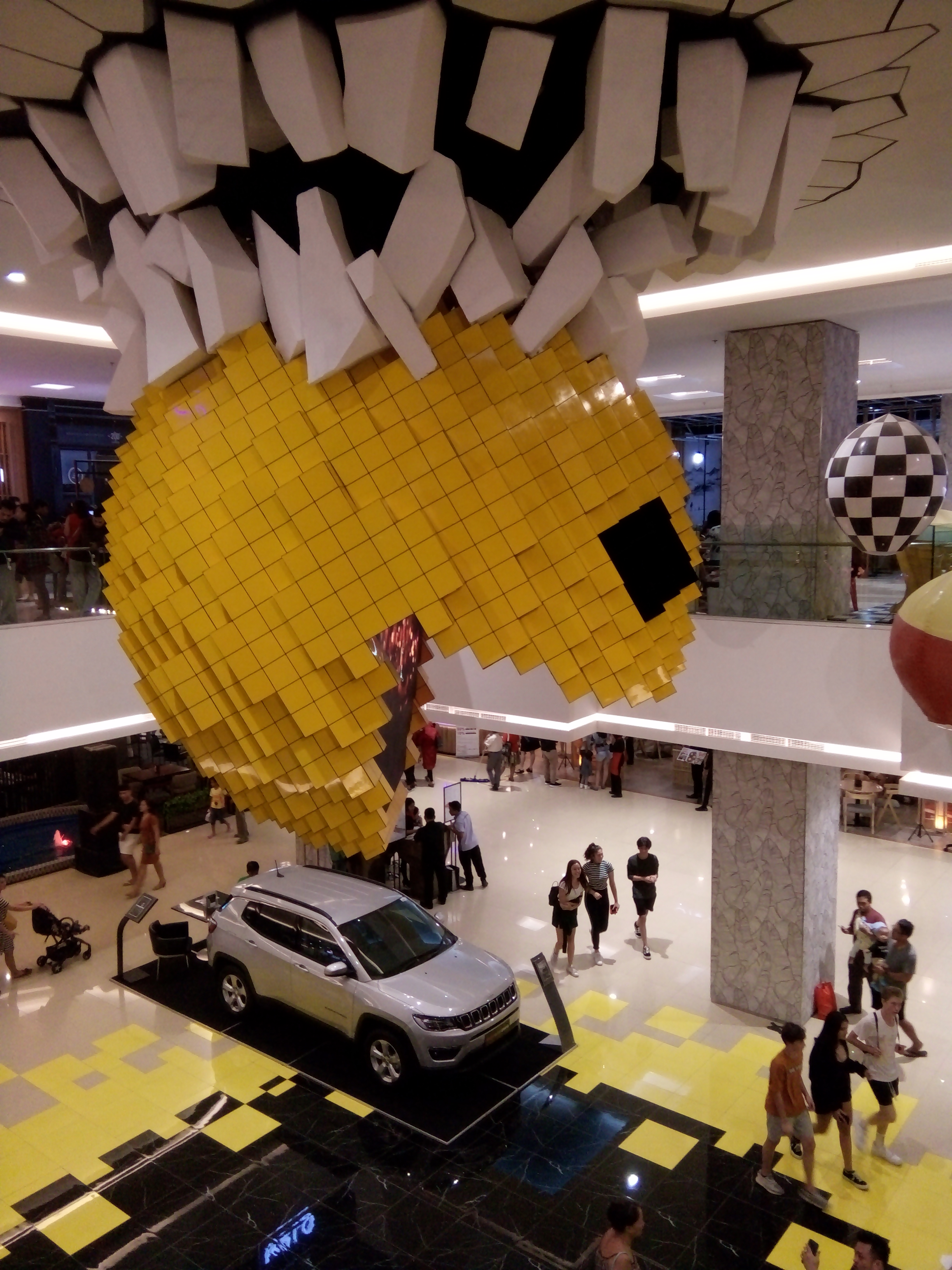
Trans Studio Bali, a shopping center that just started operating in 2019 in Denpasar

Tourism is a vital industry for Denpasar's economy. The city has become an increasingly popular destination for both domestic and international tourists. In December 2024, Denpasar recorded a total of 551,100 tourist visits, an increase from 481,646 in December 2023. In 2018, Denpasar along with Jakarta and Batam are among of 10 cities in the world with fastest growth in tourism, 32.7, 29.2 and 23.3 percent respectively.

As the capital city of Bali Province, Denpasar serves as both the cultural and administrative center of the island. It is known for its beaches, traditional markets, historic temples, local art markets, and street food scene.

Denpasar has various attractions. The white sandy beaches are well-known all over the island. The surfing beach is Serangan Island. Sanur Beach has calmer waters and is excellent for sunbathing and kitesurfing.

Ten minutes from the Ngurah Rai International Airport lies the town of Kuta (within Badung Regency not administratively under the city jurisdiction), where most of the hotels, restaurants, malls, cafes, marketplaces, and spas that cater to tourists are located. In the Denpasar area, all kinds of Balinese handicrafts are represented in local shops. These include artwork, pottery, textiles, and silver. Batik cloth is sold all over Denpasar, and batik sarongs and men's shirts are widely available.

The development of tourism and the appeal of the island of Bali have indirectly driven the progress of development in the city of Denpasar. In 2000, the number of foreign tourists who visited reached 1,413,513 people, and placed the largest number of tourists from Japan then followed by Australia, Taiwan, Europe, England, America, Singapore and Malaysia.

The tourism development policy in the city of Denpasar emphasizes environmentally conscious cultural tourism. As one of the centers of tourism development, Denpasar City is a barometer for the progress of tourism in Bali, this can be seen from the emergence of various starred hotels as a means of supporting tourism activities.

Sanur Beach is one of the most visited beach tourism areas. While Puputan Field is a green open space area in Denpasar City and also functions as the "lungs of the city".

=== Tourist destinations ===
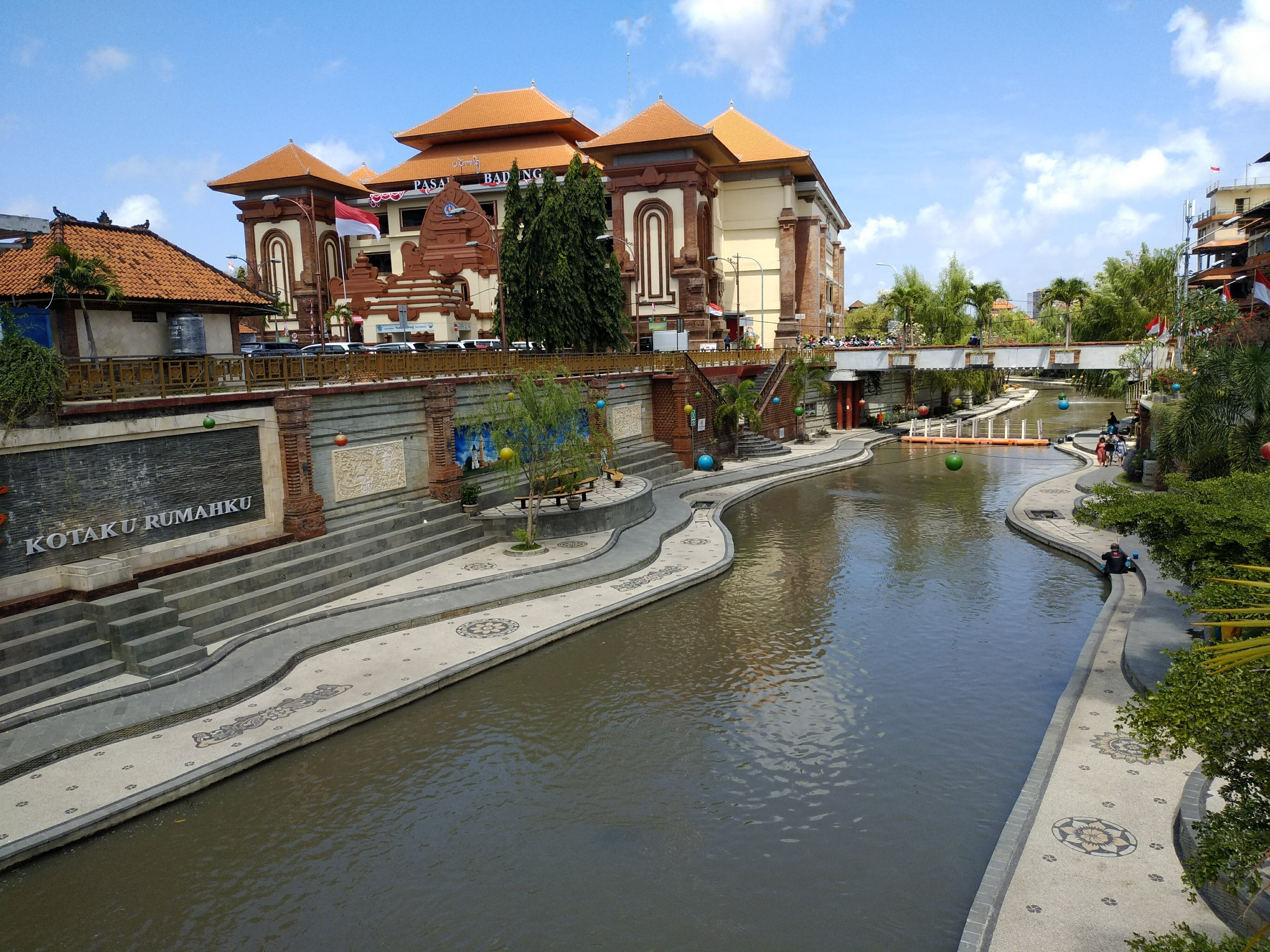
Kumbasari Park

Denpasar has several tourist attractions that have historical and recreational elements. In Denpasar City there is a museum called Bali Museum. The Bali Museum building is made to resemble a puri from the kingdoms in Bali.

- Renon Field–family activity center and also contains Bajra Sandhi Monument, a monument to the Balinese people's struggle
- Puputan Park–art performance venue
- Kreneng Market
- Simpang Dewa Ruci or Simpang Siur–there is Simpang Siur Mall or Discovery Mall
- Puri Santrian
- Sanur Beach
- Mangrove forest ecotourism or bakau
- Cultural Park
- Kertalangu Cultural Village
- Satria Bird Market
- Sindu Beach
- Pura Agung Jagatnatha
- Pura Sakenan
- Kumbasari Park

=== Culinary tourism ===
Denpasar is also famous for its culinary tourism. Some places that are very well known by both local and foreign tourists are:

- Nasi Ayam Kedewatan–Jalan Tukad Badung, Denpasar
- Nasi Ikan Mak Beng–near Hotel Radisson
- Nasi Campur–Pantai Segara, Sanur
- Babi Guling Chandra–Jalan Teuku Umar
- Warung Wardana–Jalan Merdeka, Denpasar
- Bebek Goreng HT–Jalan Merdeka, Denpasar
- Sate Plecing–Jalan Yudhistira, Denpasar
- Depot Kepiting Super–Jalan Bypass Ngurah Rai
- Resto Bali Nikmat–Jalan Raya Kuta near Alfa
- Warung Batan Waru–next to Discovery Mall
- Warung Made–Kuta
- Ikan Bakar–Jimbaran
- Nyoman Cafe–Jimbaran
- Menega Cafe–Four Seasons Jimbaran
- Jebak (Bali Culinary Trail)–Jalan Teuku Umar, Denpasar

Some of the famous Balinese souvenirs include dodol bali, brem, rahayu peanuts, milk pie, disco peanuts, salak bali, peanuts, chicken feet crackers, pia legong and Bali coffee. Some special places that sell souvenirs include:

- Krisna Shop
- Erlangga Shop 1 and Erlangga Shop 2
- Kumbasari Market

== Health ==
Denpasar City has good health service facilities in Bali Province, there are 3 government-owned hospitals including Sanglah General Hospital, Denpasar, Wangaya General Hospital and Udayana Army Hospital as well as 13 private hospitals. The Denpasar City Government has also built 10 Community Health Centers and 26 sub-community health centers, with a ratio of community health centers per 100,000 population of 1.7.

== Public services ==
=== Clean Water ===
To serve the clean water needs of the Denpasar City community, it is served by the Denpasar City PDAM, and until 2003 has been able to serve 64.82% of its population. The raw water sources of the Denpasar City PDAM are surface water and deep wells whose processing uses a Complete Water Treatment Plant (IPAL). Meanwhile, the drainage system uses a gravity and pumping system.

=== Waste ===
In handling the waste problem, the Denpasar City government uses Final Disposal Site (TPA) of waste in Sanur Kauh Village, South Denpasar District covering an area of 40 Ha. From 2002 data, the amount of waste generated in Denpasar City was 127,750 m^{3}, most of which was domestic waste reaching 71.14%. However, the volume of waste that has been handled is only 1,904 m^{3}, so the amount of waste that has not been served is 125,846 m^{3} or 98.5%. To overcome this, the city government and the community implemented a self-management system to overcome the problem of waste accumulation at the TPA.

== Education ==
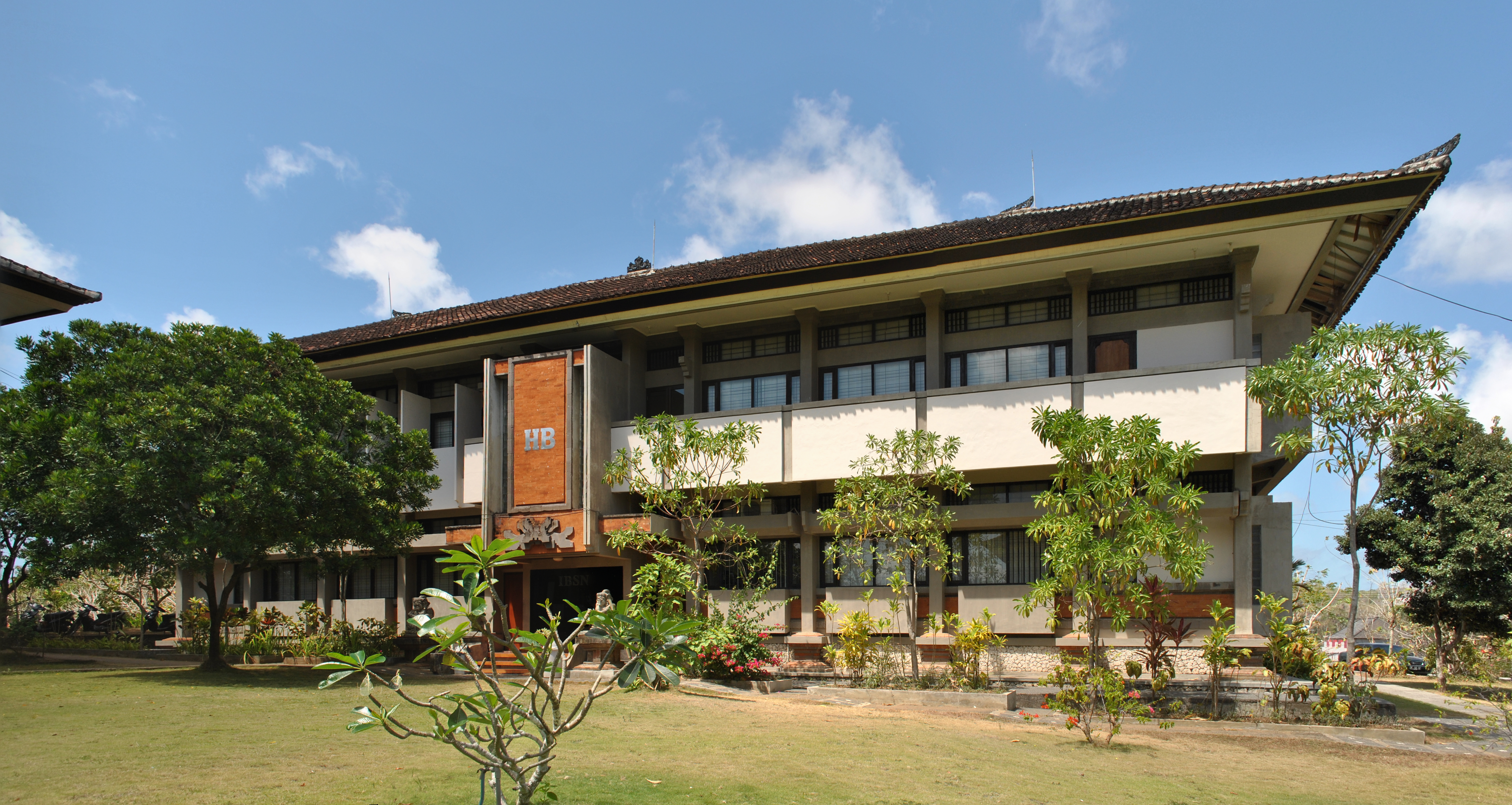
One of the buildings at Udayana University.

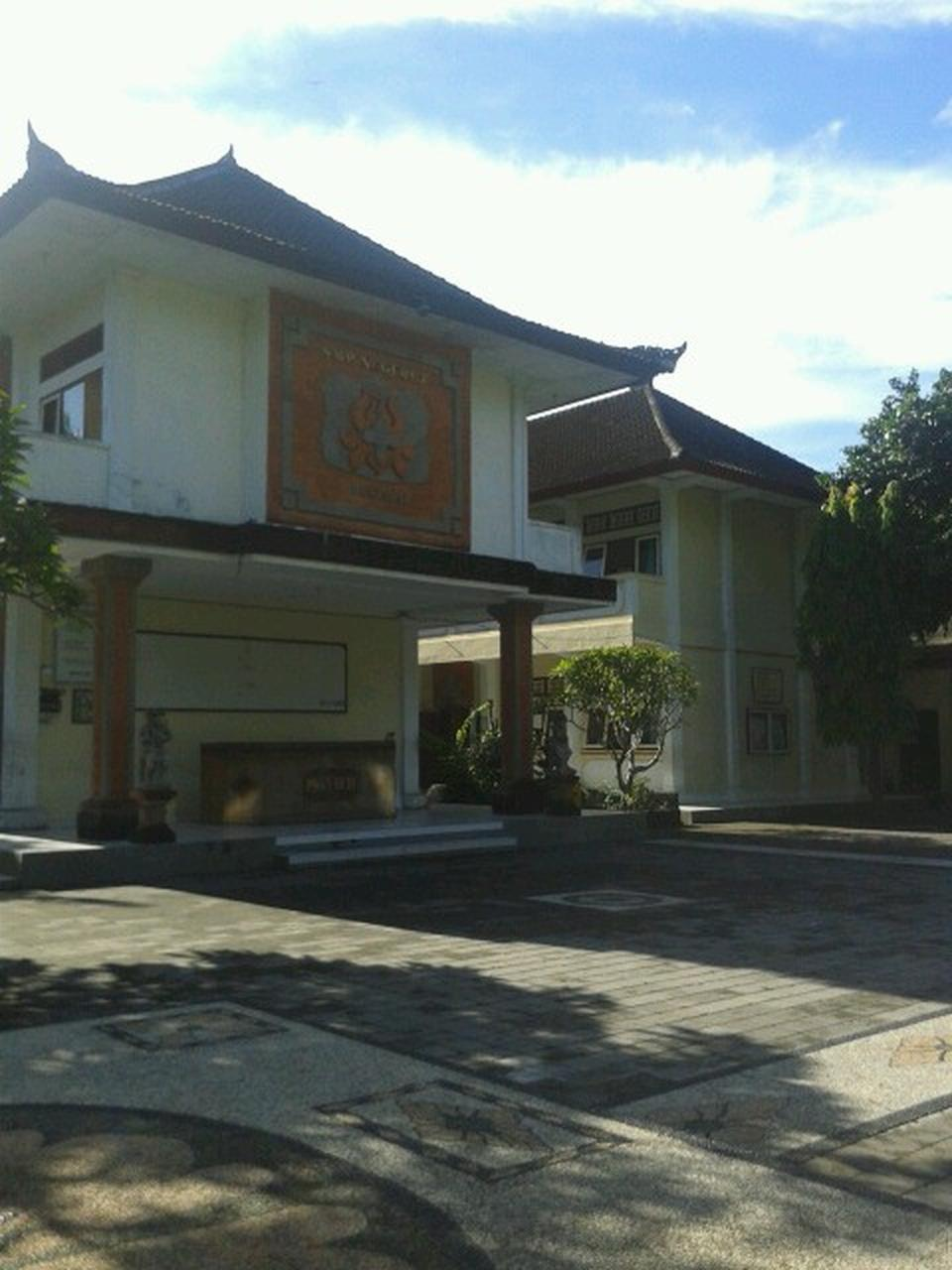
Junior high school Negeri 7 Denpasar

Many state and private universities in the province of Bali are located in the city of Denpasar. Meanwhile, for the Elementary School level and equivalent to Senior High School level, until the 2021/2022 academic year, the number of schools in Denpasar is 399 schools. Some colleges in Denpasar include:

- Udayana University
- Warmadewa University
- University of National Education
- University of National Education
- Dwijendra University
- Mahasaraswati University of Denpasar
- Indonesian Institute of the Arts, Denpasar
- Indonesia Open University
- Hita Widya Foreign Language College
- Bali Design College
- Indonesian Computer Science College
- STMIK Bandung Bali
- Mahasaraswati University
- Denpasar Open University
- Dwijendra University
- Indonesian Hindu University
- Ngurah Rai University
- I Gusti Bagus Sugriwa State Hindu University of Denpasar
- Mahendradatta University
- Indonesian Institute of the Arts Denpasar
- IKIP PGRI Bali
- Bali State Polytechnic
- Denpasar National Polytechnic
- Denpasar Health Polytechnic
- Denpasar Accounting Academy
- Denpasar Finance and Banking Academy
- Denpasar Tourism Academy
- Denpasar Islamic College

Formal education	Elementary School or Madrasah Ibtidaiyah state and private	Junior High School or Madrasah Sanawiya state and private	Senior High School or Madrasah Aliyah state and private	Vocational high school state and private	College
Number of units	235	70	35	34	25
School data in Denpasar City in 2021; Source:

== Transportation ==
=== Air ===
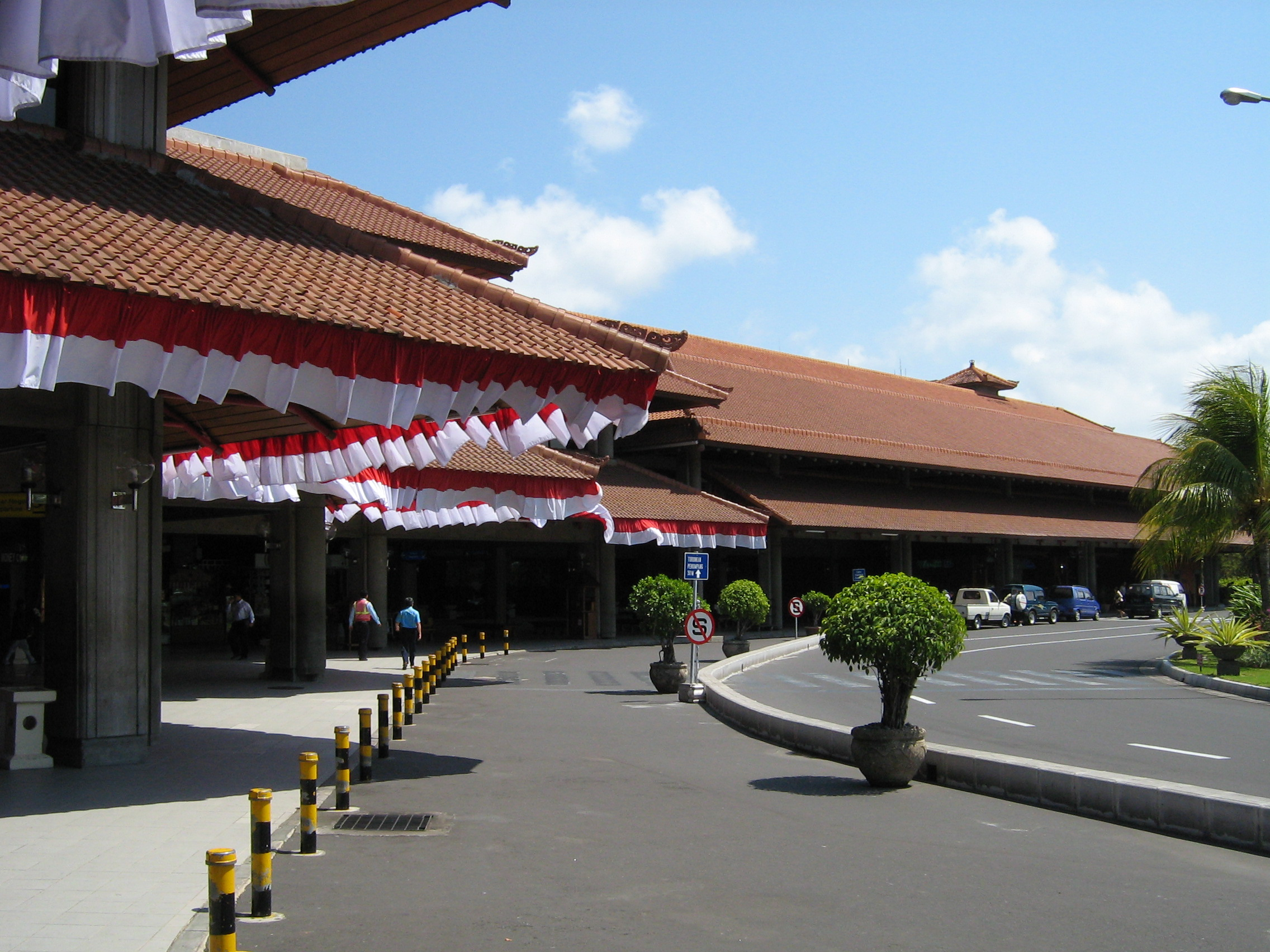
Ngurah Rai International Airport

The city is served by Ngurah Rai International Airport, one of the busiest in Indonesia.

=== Sea ===
Benoa Harbour is the entrance to the Denpasar by sea and is currently managed by PT Pelindo III. The port is located about 10 km from the city center, and has been operating since 1924.

=== Land ===
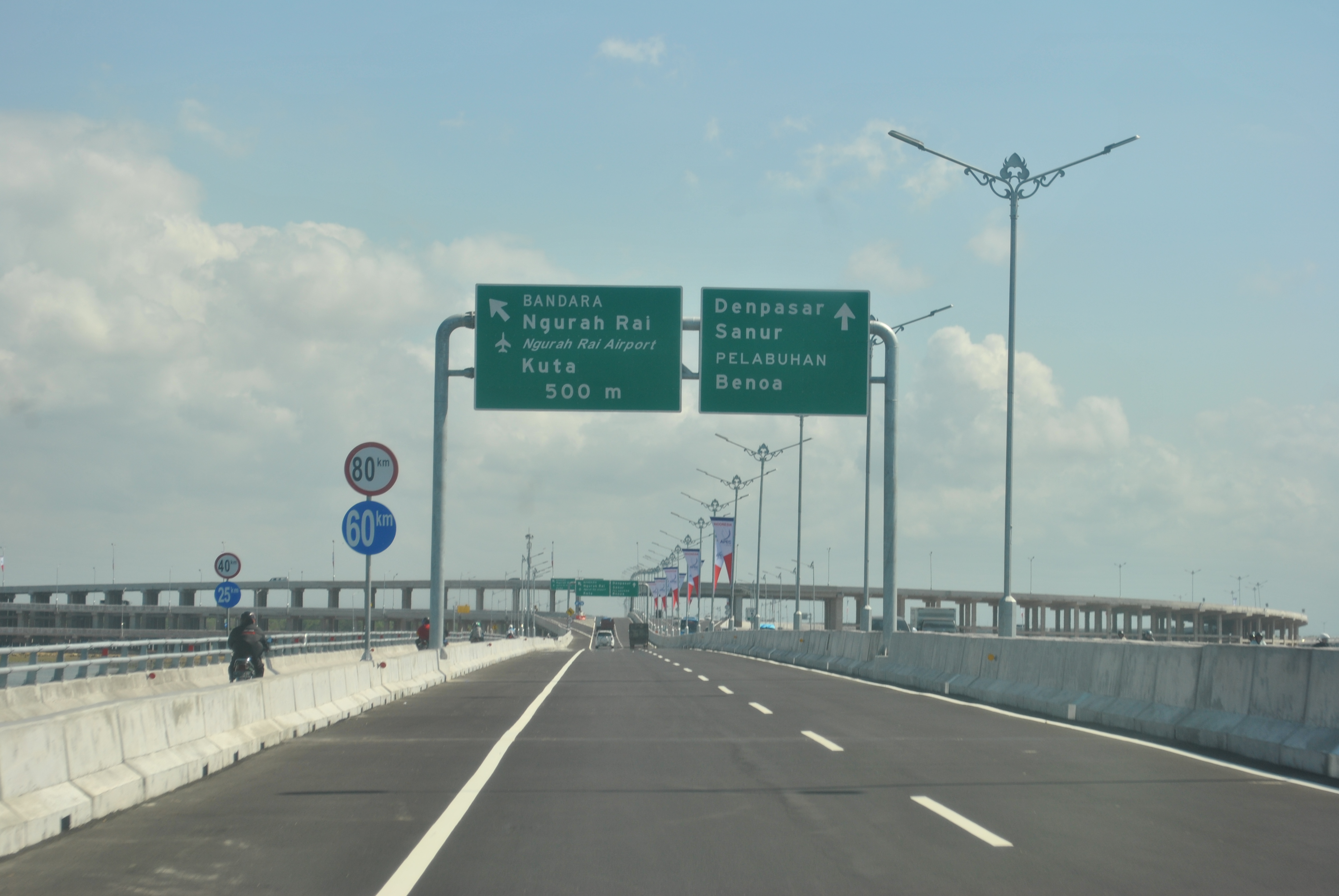
Bali Mandara Toll Road

Public transport in Denpasar, especially for urban transportation, is becoming ineffective and inefficient, with only 30% of vehicles still in operation as of 2010. Public transport is not popular and is used by only about 3% of the total population. Meanwhile, the growth of private vehicle ownership is at 11% per year and is not comparable with the construction of new roads. Congestion in the city of Denpasar is unavoidable due to this reason.

Since August 2011, the city has operated a bus rapid transit system called Trans Sarbagita. Two main routes and some feeder lines are operated daily from 4 a m. until 9 pm. There is no dedicated lane for the buses: they run on main streets. In 2012 an average of 2,800 passengers per day used the service.

- Corridor 1 Kota–GWK
- Corridor 2 Kota–Nusa Dua

The central government's Ministry of Transport initiated another system called Trans Metro Dewata on 7 September 2020. The system now serves 5 corridors, all also without separate lane, focusing more on the city.

- Corridor 1 (K1B): Sentral Parkir Kuta Badung – Terminal Pesiapan Tabanan
- Corridor 2 (K2B): GOR Ngurah Rai – Bandara Ngurah Rai
- Corridor 3 (K3B): Terminal Ubung – Pantai Matahari Terbit
- Corridor 4 (K4B): Terminal Ubung – Sentral Parkir Monkey Forest
- Corridor 5 (K5B): Sentral Parkir Kuta Badung–Terminal Ubung

Two major improvements to the road system were completed in 2013. In August, the underpass at the Dewa Ruci intersection was opened. It is slightly beyond the bounds of Denpasar but was co-financed by the town because of the expected positive effects on traffic in Denpasar.
Then the four-lane Bali Mandara Toll Road was opened on 1 October, connecting Benoa Harbor, Ngurah Rai Airport, and Nusa Dua.

== Sports ==
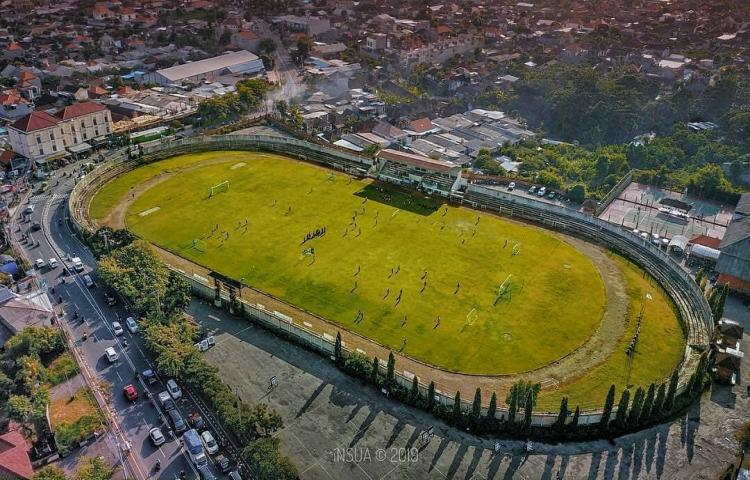
Kompyang Sujana Stadium field

Denpasar has hosted numerous international and national sporting events. Denpasar was the venue for the 2008 Asian Beach Games in Bali. Denpasar also held the 2009 Asian Archery Championships.

In football, Denpasar is home to the football club Perseden Denpasar, which plays in the Liga 3.

== Culture and sights ==
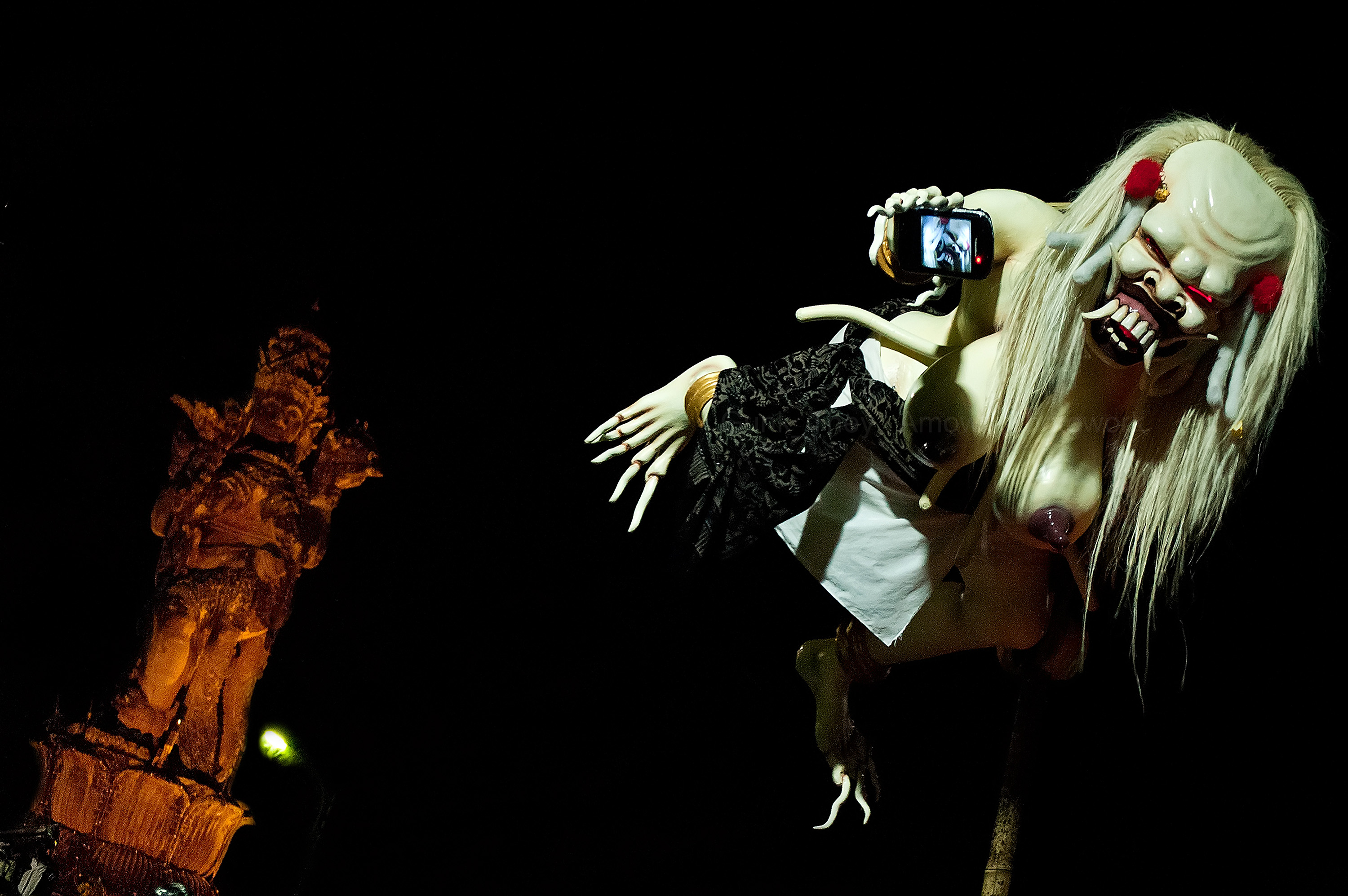
Ogoh-ogoh celebration 1 day before Nyepi holiday at the Catur Muka Statue

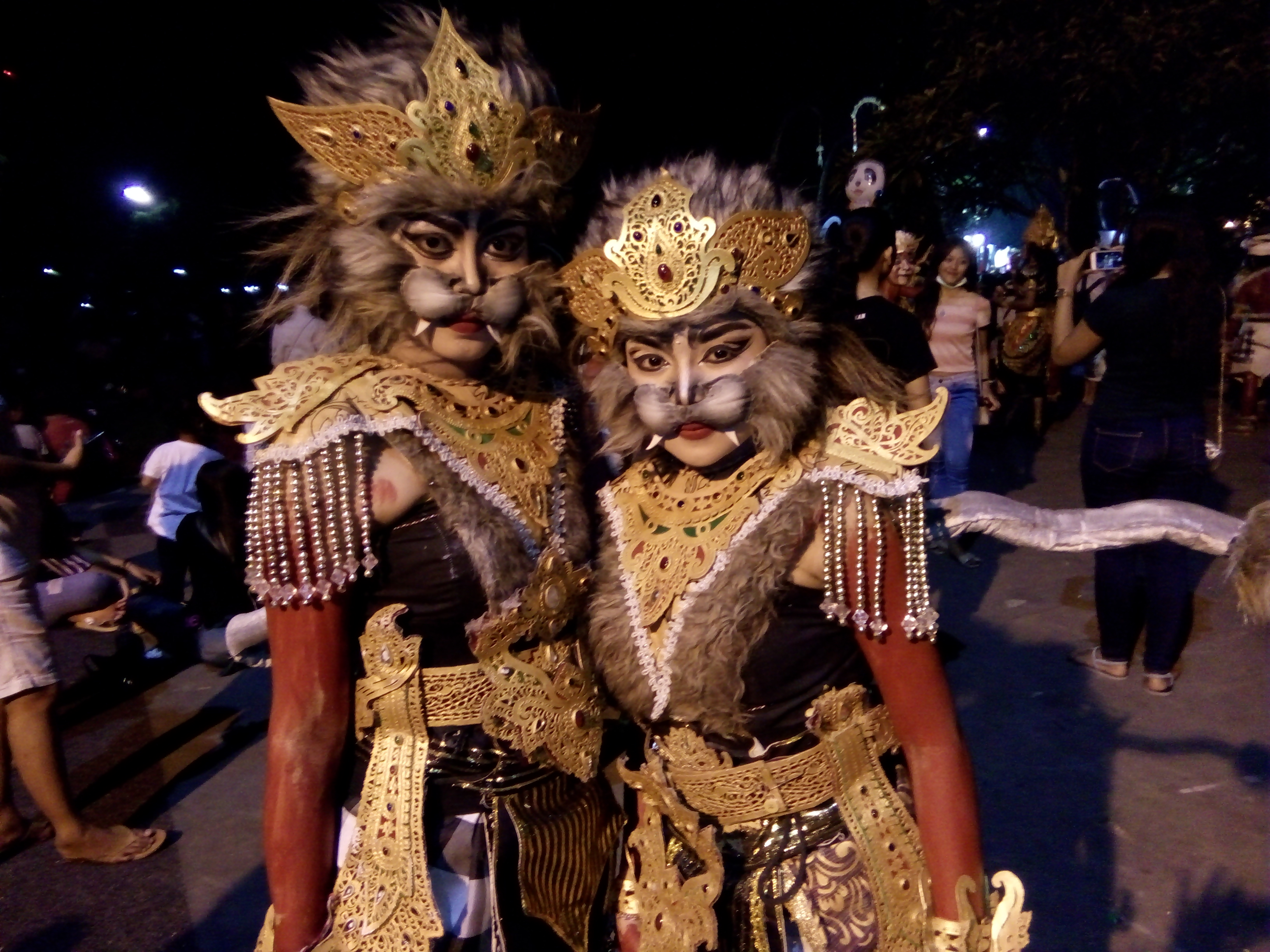
Participants of the Baleganjur Festival in Denpasar in 2019.

While arts and culture in Denpasar are largely synonymous with Hindu art and culture, there has also been a high level of interaction with other cultures that accompanied the arrival of visitors from all walks of life. Traditional values inspired by Hindu religious rituals still strongly influence the city.

Traditional Balinese culture is still deeply rooted in Denpasar. It includes values, norms, and behaviors in society based on patrilineal kinship systems. However, over time many of the customary laws have been disputed by people, especially regarding matters of gender and inheritance.

Denpasar has various sights to offer:

- Pura Jagatnatha is the most important Hindu temple of Denpasar. It was built in 1953.
- Puri Pemecutan is the former royal palace of Denpasar, which was destroyed in a fire during the Dutch intervention in Bali (1906). The palace was rebuilt in a comparatively modest style and can be visited.
- Pura Maospahit is a Hindu temple that was built in the 14th century and was heavily damaged by the 1917 Bali earthquake and rebuilt afterward. The temple houses two impressive statues of Garuda and Batara Bayu, a mystic giant.
- Pura Pengerebongan is one of the Hindu temples in Denpasar whose existence is very strongly related to the history of the palace in Kesiman. The temple is located on Jalan WR. Supratman, Denpasar, has a unique history and traditional tradition, namely Ngerebong trance bulk which is held every Redite Pon Medangsia.
- St. Joseph Church is a Roman Catholic church built in a Hindu style.
- Bajra Sandhi Monument is a major landmark in Denpasar, set right in the centre of the Renon Square (otherwise locally referred to simply as, 'Puputan Renon'). The site is adjacent to the Bali Governor's office and is hard to miss with its grand structure that resembles a Balinese Hindu priest's praying bell, or 'bajra'. Inside the base is a museum that displays various historical dioramas of the people's past struggle for independence.

=== Museums ===
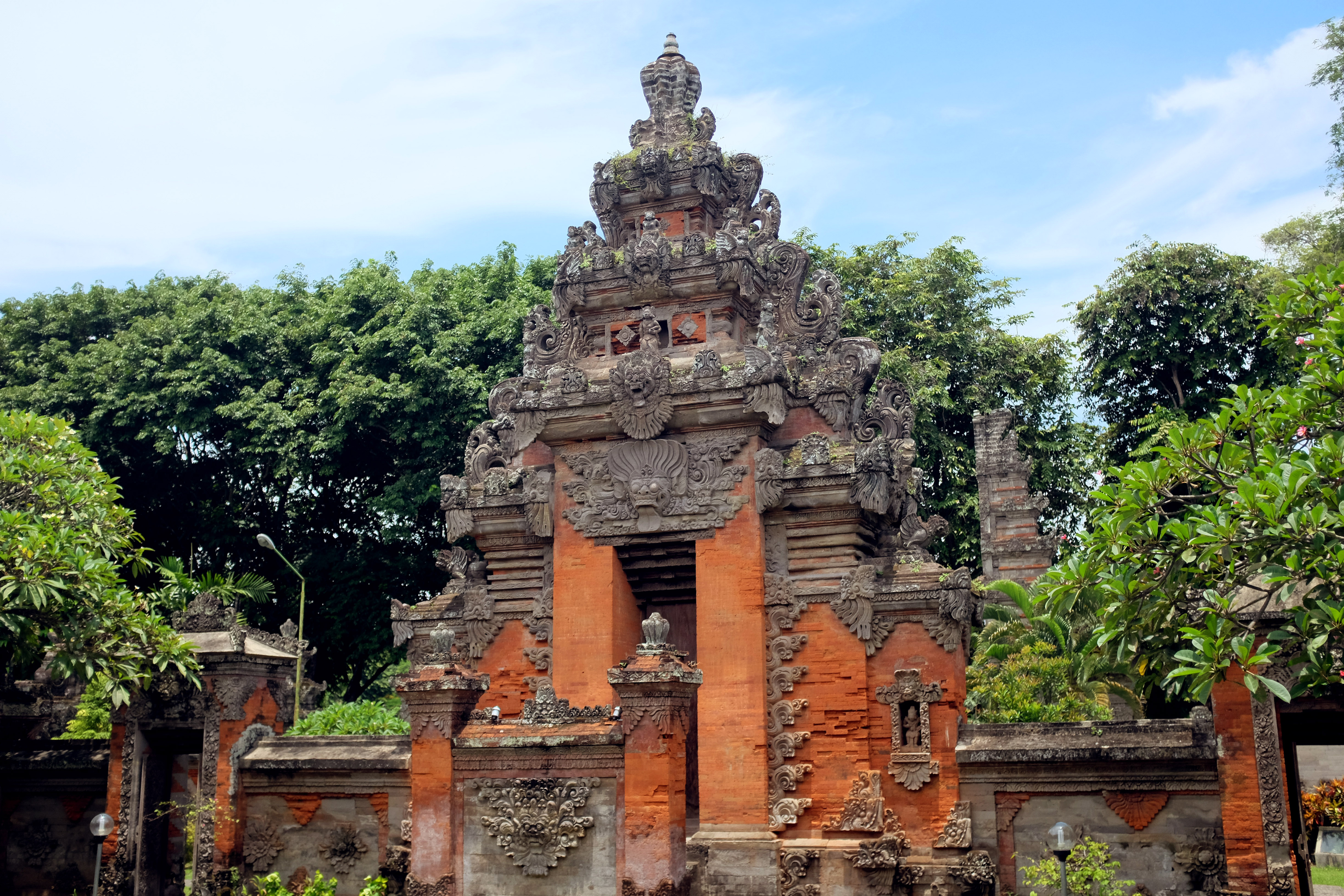
.

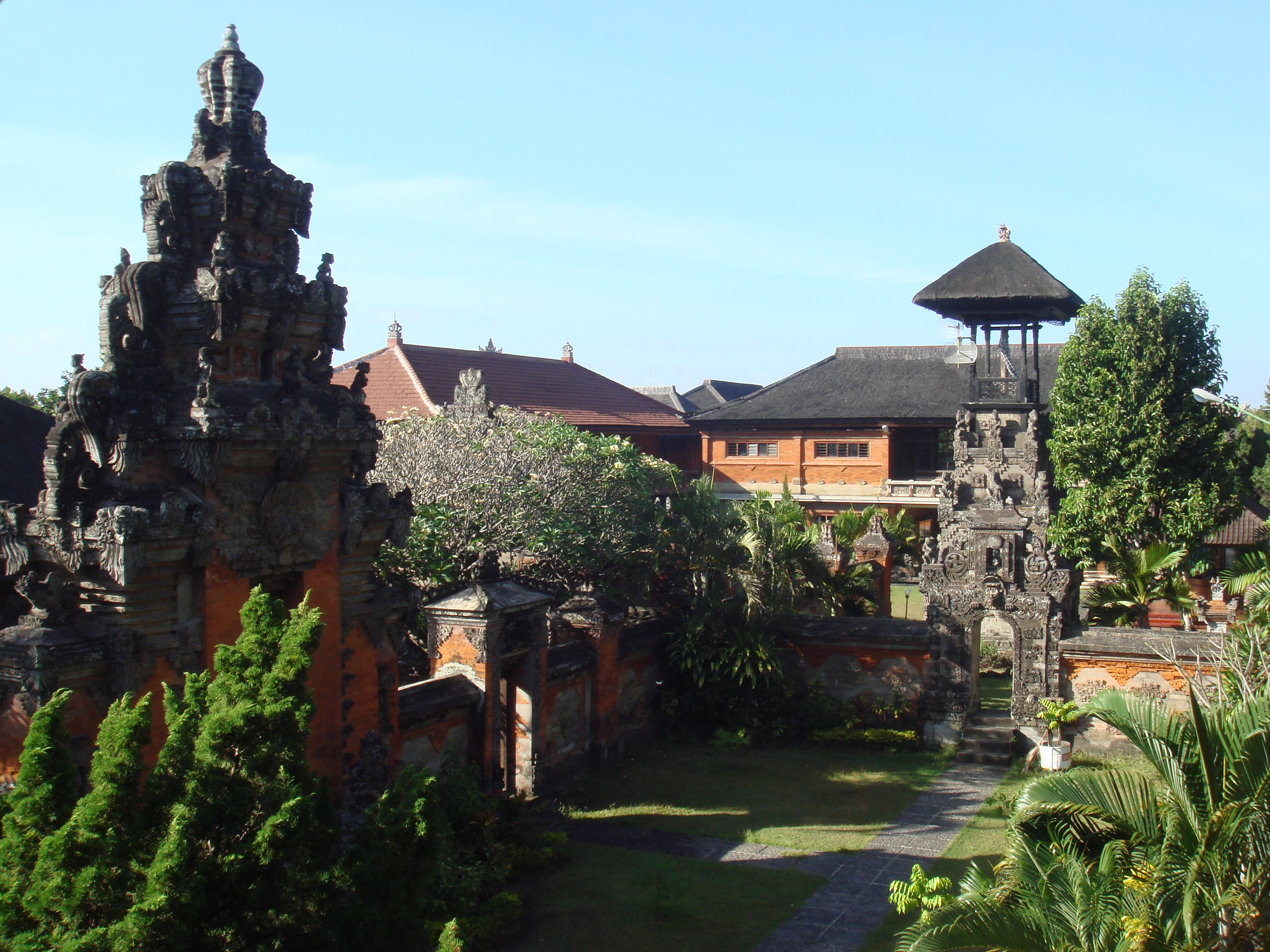
Bali Museum

The Bali Museum features Balinese art and history. The museum is built in the traditional Balinese style. There are four main buildings inside the museum, each with their unique specialization of exhibits.

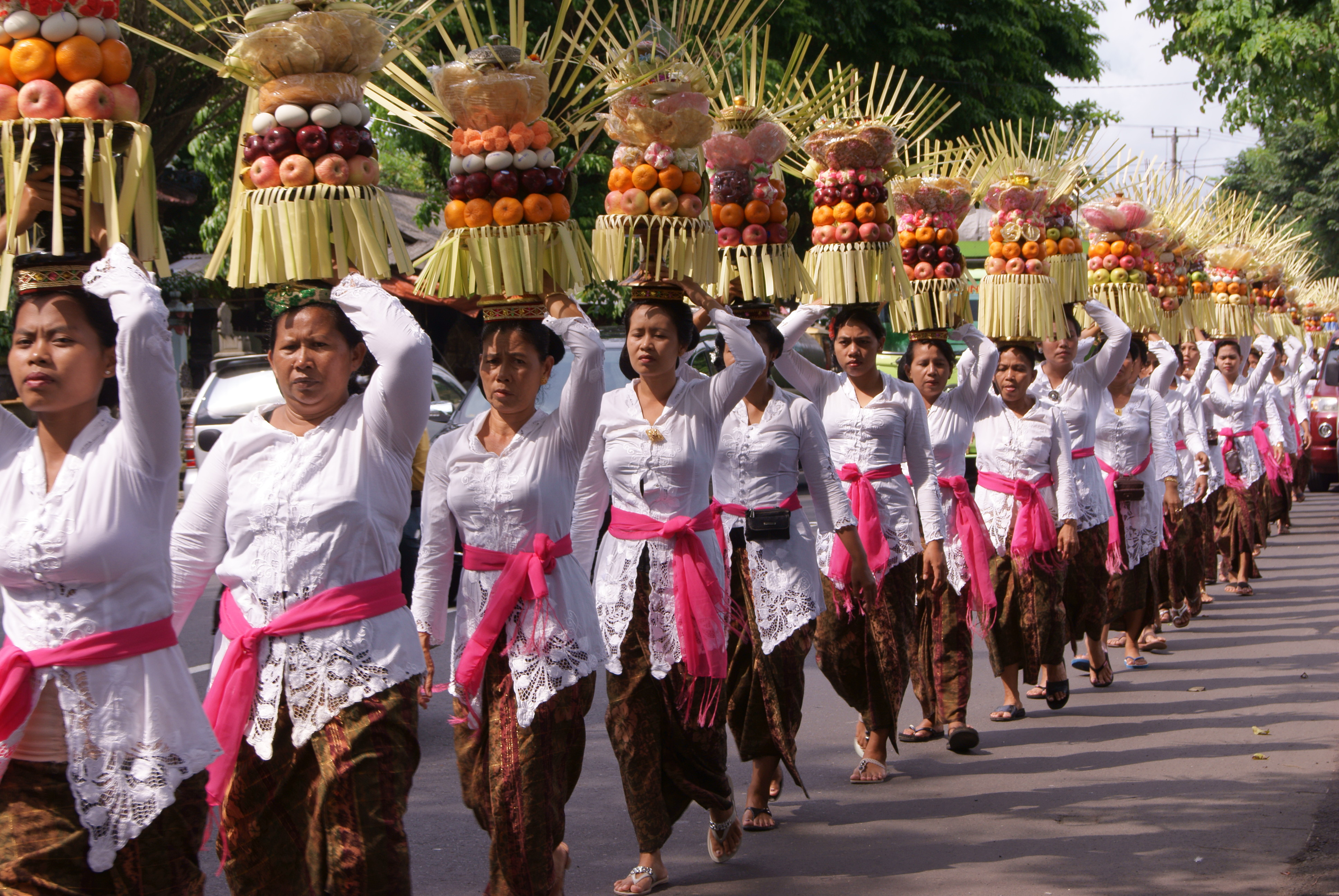
Balinese ritual

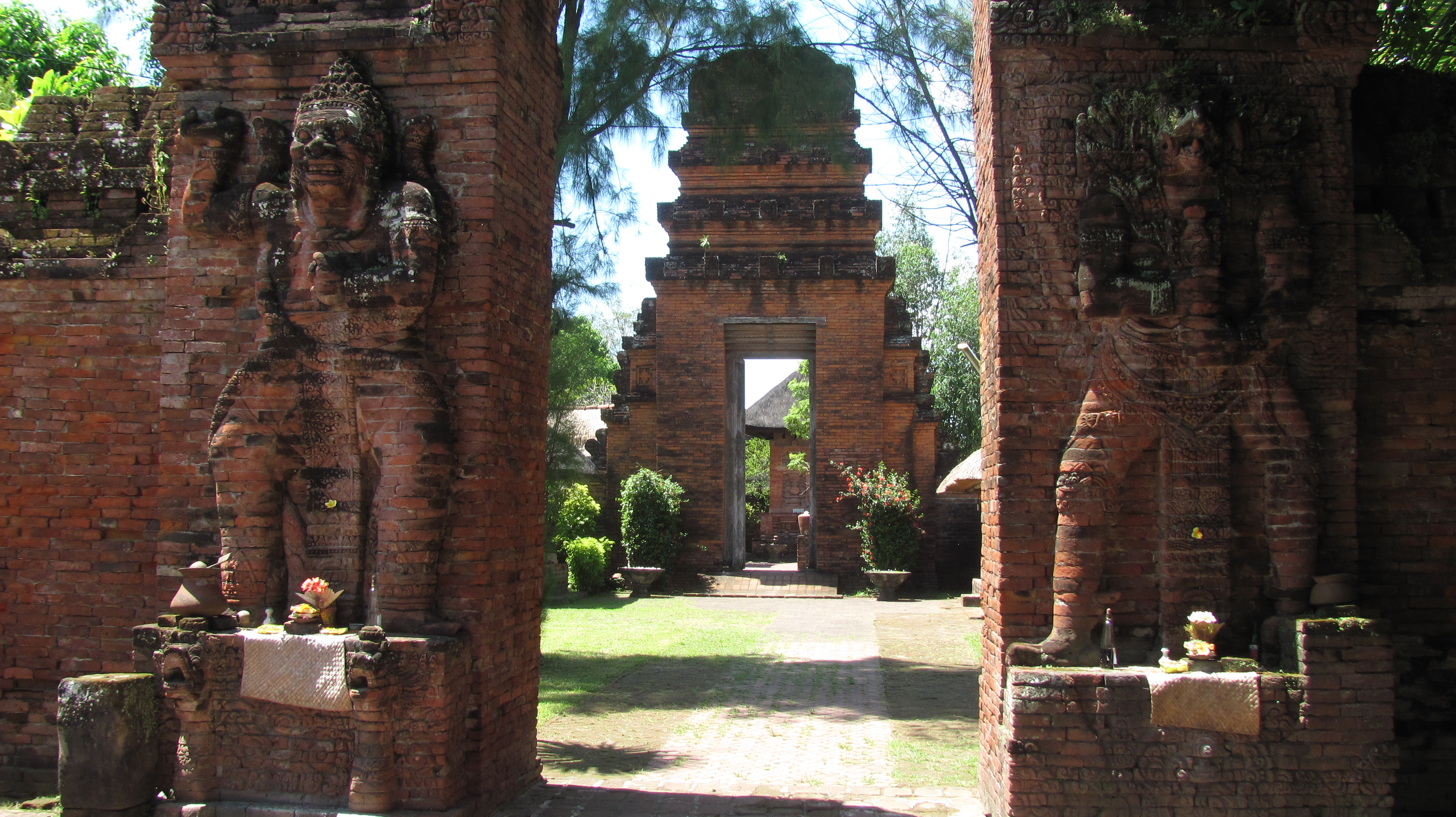
Hindu temple Pura Maospahit

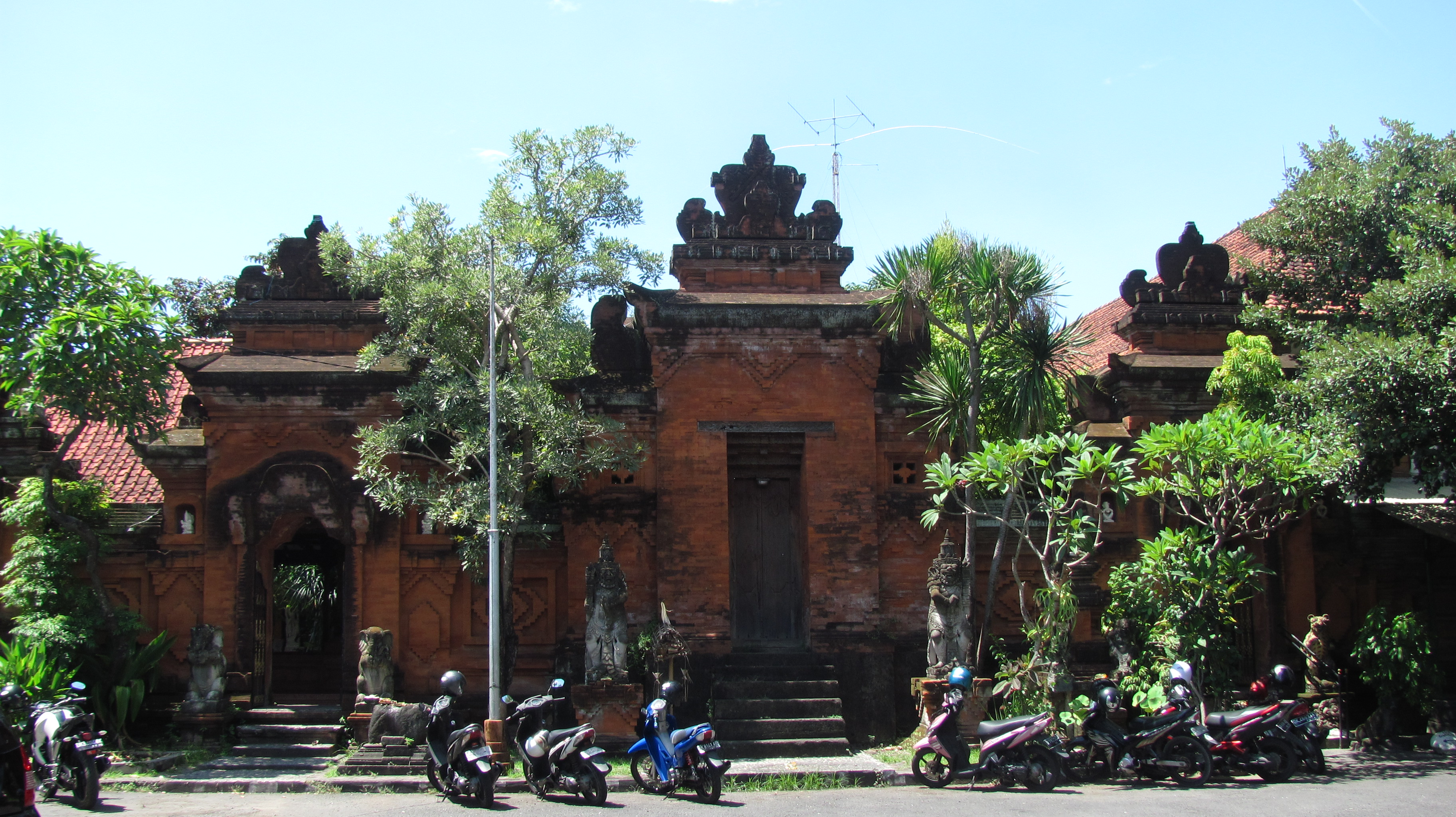
Puri Pemecutan Palace

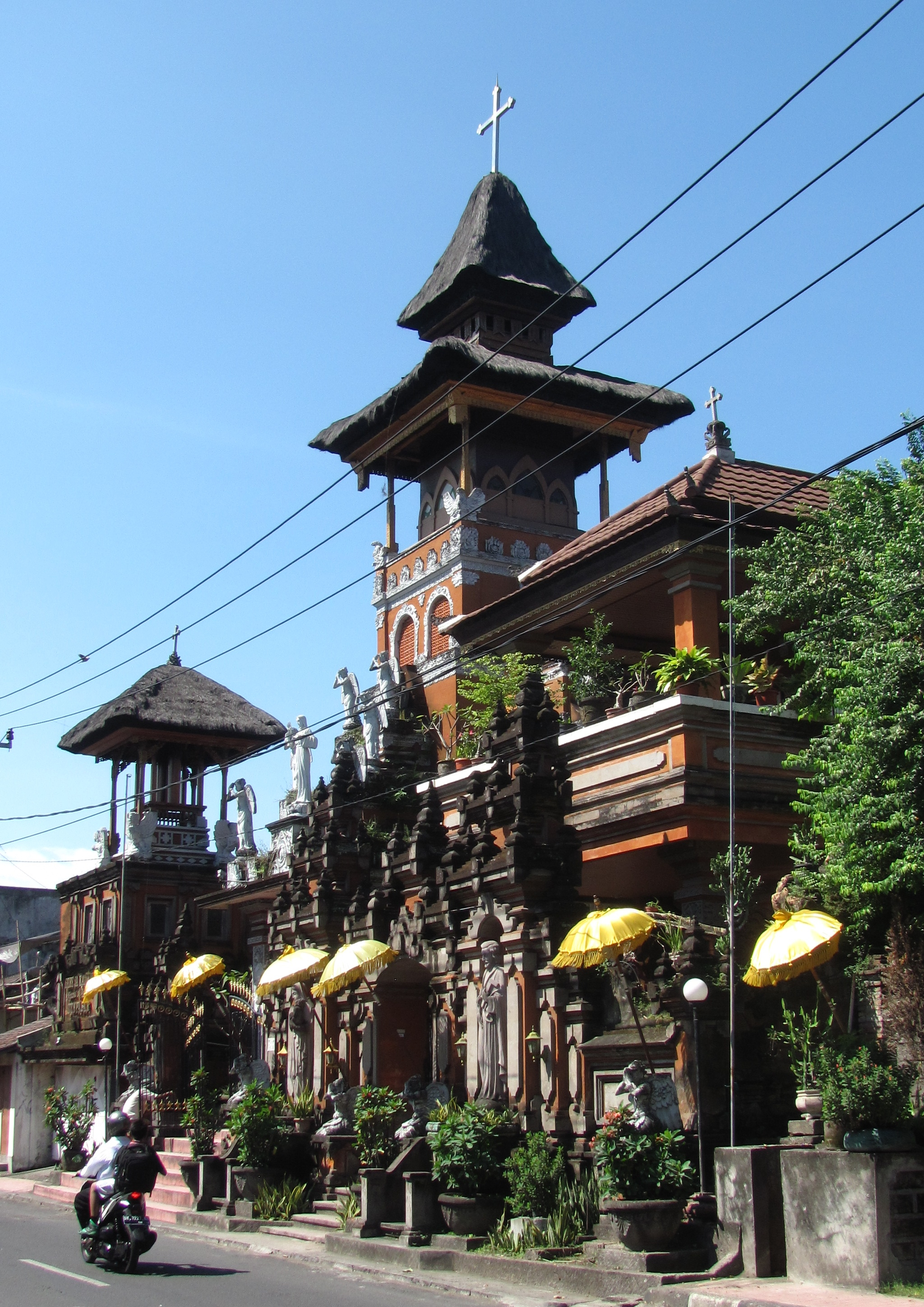
Saint Joseph's Roman Catholic Church

== Sister cities ==
Denpasar is twinned with:

- Asenovgrad, Bulgaria
- Mossel Bay, South Africa
- Spassky District, Russia
- Palembang, Indonesia
- Veracruz, Veracruz, Mexico
- Gran Canaria, Spain
- Phuket, Thailand
- Haikou, China
- George Town, Penang, Malaysia
- Kuching, Sarawak, Malaysia
- Kuala Lumpur, Malaysia

== See also ==
- Bali Museum
- Denpasar International Airport
- List of twin towns and sister cities in Indonesia
