= 2024 Denpasar mayoral election =

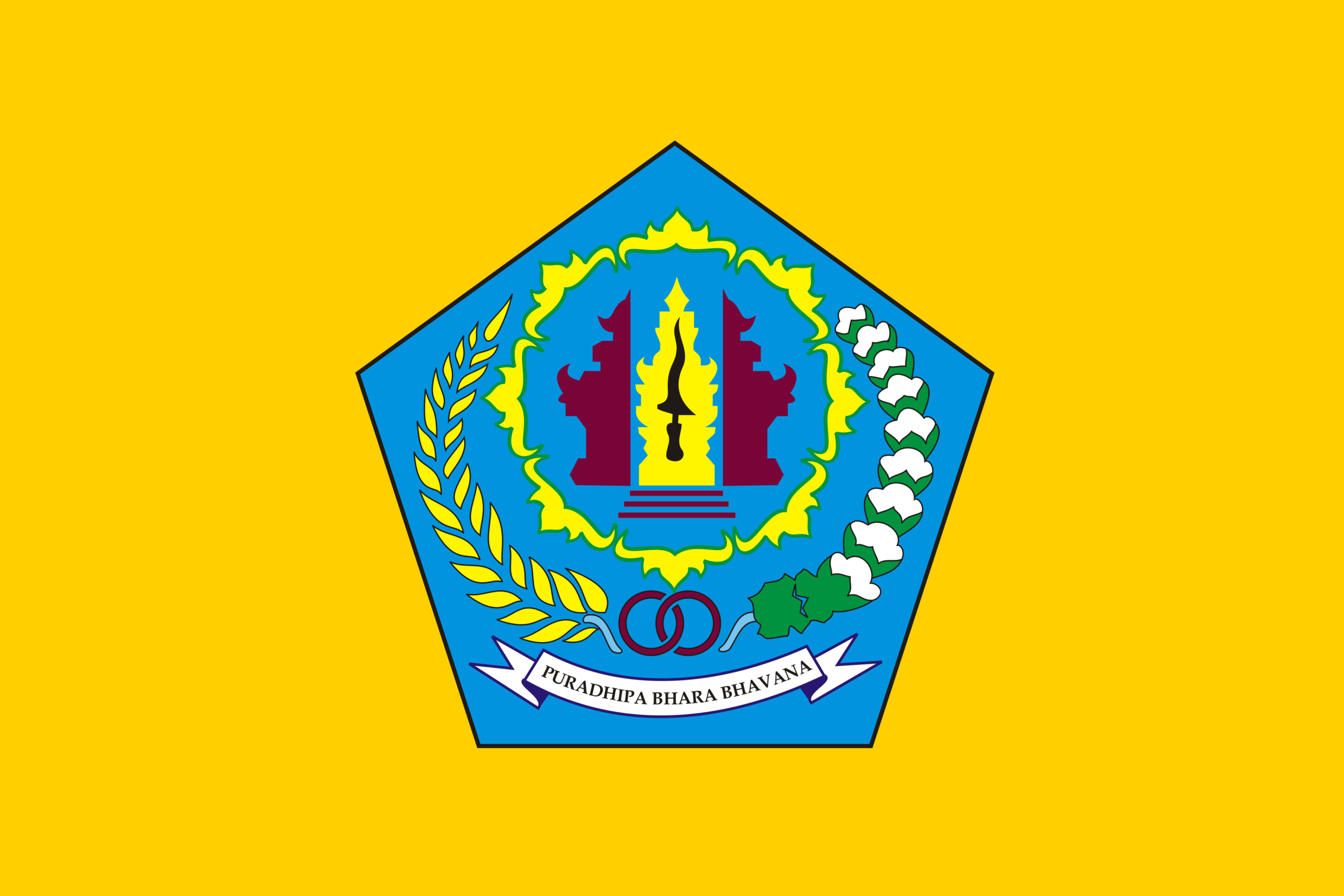
- 27 November 2024
- Registered: 507,561
- Turnout: 59.54% (▲5.75pp)
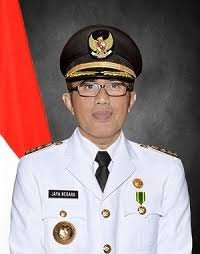

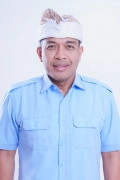
Candidate	I Gusti Ngurah Jaya Negara	Gede Ngurah Ambara Putra
Party	PDI-P	Gerindra
Alliance	Alliance of 7 political parties	KIM Plus
Running mate	I Kadek Agus Arya Wibawa	I Nengah Adi Yasa Susanto
Popular vote	217.568	75,963
Percentage	74.12%	25.88%
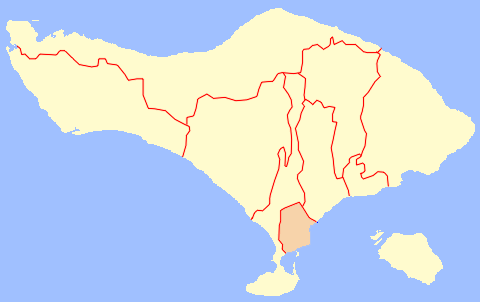
- Location map of Denpasar
Mayor before election
Dewa Gede Mahendra Putra (acting)
Independent
Elected Mayor
I Gusti Ngurah Jaya Negara
PDI-P

The 2024 Denpasar mayoral election was held on 27 November 2024 as part of nationwide local elections to elect both the mayor and vice mayor of Denpasar, Bali, Indonesia, for a five-year term (2025–2030). The previous election was held in 2020. Former Mayor I Gusti Ngurah Jaya Negara of the Indonesian Democratic Party of Struggle (PDI-P) won the election in a landslide with 74% of the vote, securing a second term. He defeated Gede Ngurah Ambara Putra of the Gerindra Party, who received 25%.

== Electoral system ==
The election, like other local elections in 2024, follow the first-past-the-post system where the candidate with the most votes wins the election, even if they do not win a majority. It is possible for a candidate to run uncontested, in which case the candidate is still required to win a majority of votes "against" an "empty box" option. Should the candidate fail to do so, the election will be repeated on a later date.

== Political map ==
Following the 2024 Indonesian legislative election, seven political parties are represented in the Denpasar DPRD:

Political parties	Seat count
Indonesian Democratic Party of Struggle (PDI-P)	22 / 45
Great Indonesia Movement Party (Gerindra)	9 / 45
Party of Functional Groups (Golkar)	7 / 45
Indonesian Solidarity Party (PSI)	3 / 45
Democratic Party (Demokrat)	2 / 45
NasDem Party	1 / 45
Gelora Party	1 / 45

== Candidates ==
=== Nominations ===
According to electoral regulations, in order to qualify for the election, candidates were required to secure support from a political party or a coalition of parties controlling 9 seats (20 percent of all seats) in the Denpasar Regional House of Representatives (DPRD). The Indonesian Democratic Party of Struggle and the Gerindra Party, with 22 and 9 seats in the DPRD respectively, are both eligible to nominate a candidate without forming coalitions with other parties. Candidates may alternatively demonstrate support to run as an independent in form of photocopies of identity cards. In Denpasar's case, this corresponds to 42,152 copies. No independent candidates registered with the General Elections Commission (KPU) before the set deadline.

=== Nominees ===
1
2024 Advanced Indonesia Coalition Plus ticket
Gede Ngurah Ambara Putra	I Nengah Yasa Adi Susanto
for Mayor	for Vice Mayor
tepi	tepi
Indonesia Senator from Bali (2019–2024)	Businessman
Parties
13 / 45 (29%) Gerindra (9 seats); NasDem (3 seats); PSI (1 seat)

The pair is also supported by the three non-parliamentary parties, namely the Nusantara Awakening Party (PKN, the Prosperous Justice Party (PKS), and the Labour Party.

Although some member parties of the Advanced Indonesia Coalition Plus (KIM Plus) gave their support to the Jaya-Wibawa pair, the Ngurah Ambara-Nengah Adi Susanto pair is still supported by the national coalition KIM Plus since the Gerindra Party was supported this pair and de facto hold the coalition.

=== Nominees ===
2
2024 Indonesian Democratic Party of Struggle ticket
I Gusti Ngurah Jaya Negara	I Kadek Agus Arya Wibawa
for Mayor	for Vice Mayor
tepi	tepi
Mayor of Denpasar (2021–2025)	Vice Mayor of Denpasar (2021–2025)
Parties
31 / 45 (69%) PDI-P (22 seats); Golkar (7 seats); Democratic (2 seats); Gelora (1 seat)

The Jaya-Wibawa pair is also supported by the three non-parliamentary parties, namely the National Awakening Party (PKB), the Indonesian Unity Party (Perindo), and the People's Conscience Party (Hanura).

=== Former potential candidates ===
The following are individuals who have either been publicly mentioned as a potential candidate by a political party in the DPRD, publicly declared their candidacy with press coverage, or considered as a potential candidate by media outlets:

- I Gusti Ngurah Jaya Negara (PDI-P), incumbent mayor.

- I Kadek Agus Arya Wibawa (PDI-P), incumbent vice mayor (as running mate).

- Anak Agung Ngurah Rai Iswara, former city secretary of Denpasar.
- Ida Bagus Gede Sidharta, businessman in the tourism industry.
- Ida Bagus Ngurah Sidhayatra Wijaya, son of former Denpasar mayor Ida Bagus Rai Mantra.

== Results ==
Candidate	Running mate	Party	Votes	%
I Gusti Ngurah Jaya Negara	I Kadek Agus Arya Wibawa	Indonesian Democratic Party of Struggle	217,568	74.12
Gede Ngurah Ambara Putra	I Nengah Yasa Adi Susanto	Gerindra Party	75,963	25.88
Total			293,531	100.00
Valid votes			293,531	97.02
Invalid/blank votes			9,004	2.98
Total votes			302,535	100.00
Registered voters/turnout			508,140	59.54
Source: KPU
