= 2020 Denpasar mayoral election =

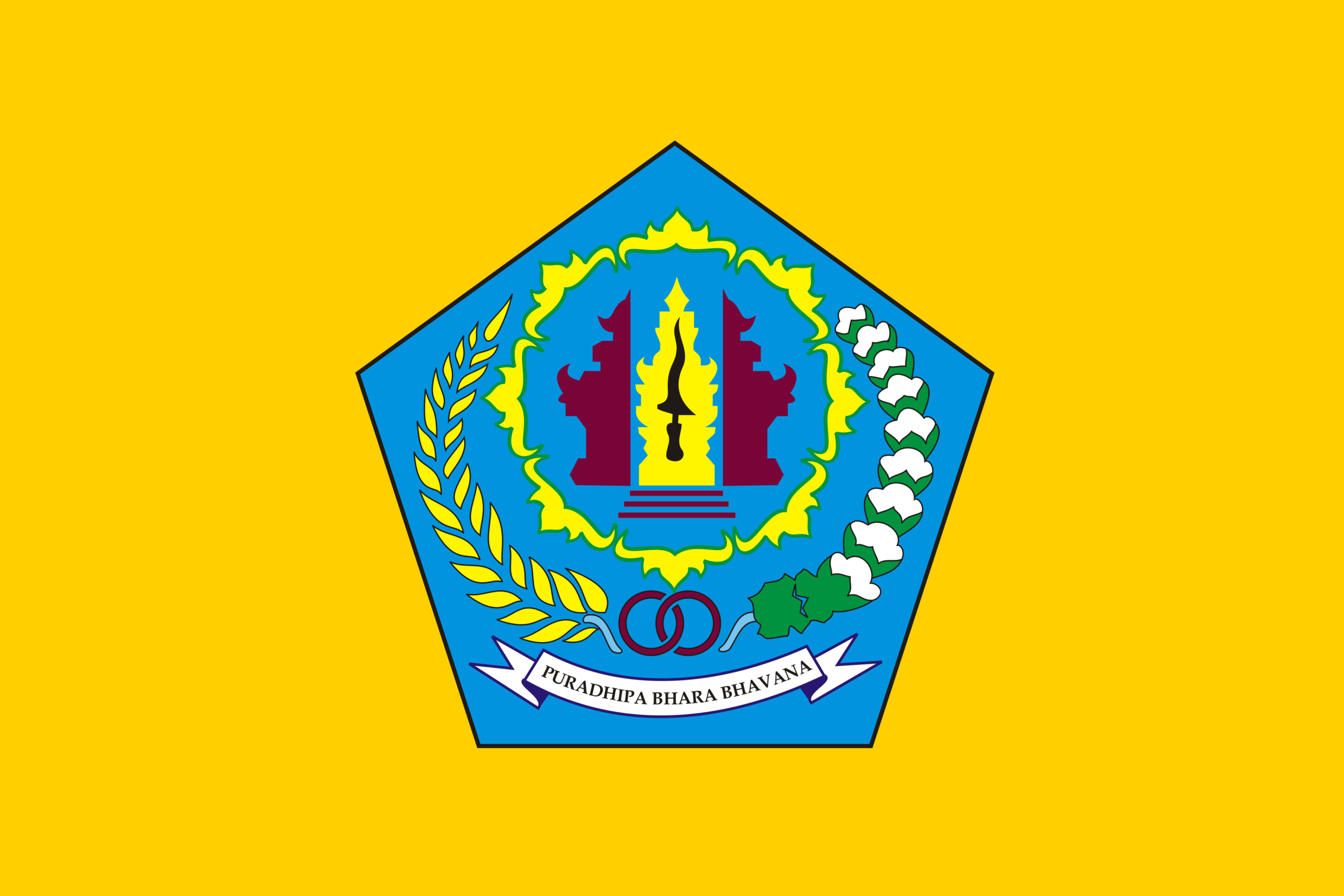
← 2015	9 December 2020	2024 →
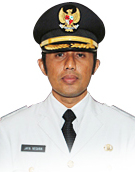

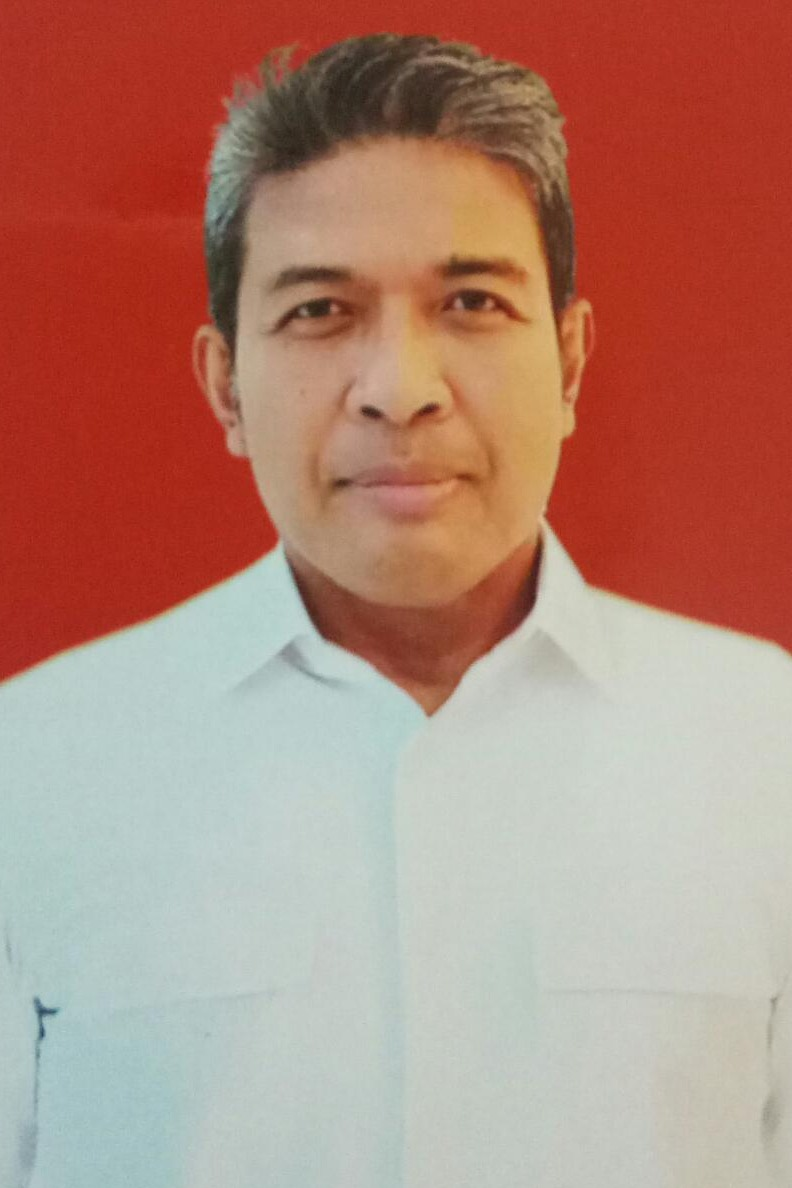
Candidate	I Gusti Ngurah Jaya Negara	Gede Ngurah Ambara Putra
Party	PDI-P	Independent (Golkar's nominee)
Alliance	Gerindra – PSI – Hanura	Golkar –Democratic – NasDem
Running mate	I Kadek Agus Arya Wibawa	Made Bagus Kertanegara
popular vote	184,655	42,730
Percentage	81.21%	18.79%
Supported by	PKS, PBB, Perindo, PKB, Gelora	PAN
- Results by district and subdistrict
Mayor before election
Ida Bagus Rai Mantra
PDI-P
Elected mayor
I Gusti Ngurah Jaya Negara
PDI-P

The 2020 Denpasar mayoral election was held on 9 December 2020 to elect both the mayor and vice-mayor of Denpasar, Bali, Indonesia, for the five-year term 2021–2025. I Gusti Ngurah Jaya Negara from the Indonesian Democratic Party of Struggle (PDI-P) was elected mayor, winning more than 80% of the vote.

The incumbent mayor, Ida Bagus Rai Mantra, was term-limited and couldn't run for re-election.

== Parliamentary seats ==
The results of the 2019 legislative election in Denpasar City there are 7 Political Parties with a total of 45 Seats in the Denpasar City Regional House of Representatives (DPRD):

No.	Political parties	Number of seats	Change in seats (2014)
1	PDI-P	22 / 45	▲4 seats
2	Golkar	8 / 45	Steady
3	Gerindra	4 / 45	▼1 seats
4	Democratic	4 / 45	▼2 seats
5	NasDem	3 / 45	▲2 seats
6	PSI	2 / 45	New entry
7	Hanura	2 / 45	▼2 seats

== Candidates ==
The general election was attended by two pairs of mayoral and vice mayoral candidates.

Number order	Candidates for Mayor and Vice Mayor		Parties	DPRD seats	Ref.
1			PDI-P (22 seats); Gerindra (4 seats); PSI (2 seats); Hanura (2 seats)	30 / 45	
1	I Gusti Ngurah Jaya Negara (PDI-P)	I Kadek Agus Arya Wibawa (PDI-P)	PDI-P (22 seats); Gerindra (4 seats); PSI (2 seats); Hanura (2 seats)	30 / 45	
1	Vice Mayor of Denpasar (2016-2021)	Member of the Denpasar City Regional House of Representatives (2019-2020)	PDI-P (22 seats); Gerindra (4 seats); PSI (2 seats); Hanura (2 seats)	30 / 45	
2			Golkar (8 seats); Democratic (4 seats); NasDem (3 seats)	15 / 45	
2	Gede Ngurah Ambara Putra (Non-Partisan)	Made Bagus Kertanegara (Non-Partisan)	Golkar (8 seats); Democratic (4 seats); NasDem (3 seats)	15 / 45	
2	Head of the Education Park 45 Foundation Denpasar City	Deputy of the Traditional Village Council Denpasar	Golkar (8 seats); Democratic (4 seats); NasDem (3 seats)	15 / 45	

== Results ==
Candidate	Running mate	Party	Votes	%
I Gusti Ngurah Jaya Negara	I Kadek Agus Arya Wibawa	PDI-P	184,655	81.21
Gede Ngurah Ambara Putra	Made Bagus Kertanegara	Independent	42,730	18.79
Total			227,385	100.00
Valid votes			227,385	95.01
Invalid/blank votes			11,940	4.99
Total votes			239,325	100.00
Registered voters/turnout			444,929	53.79
Source: General Elections Commission and Antara
