= 2018 Bali gubernatorial election =

Local election in Indonesia

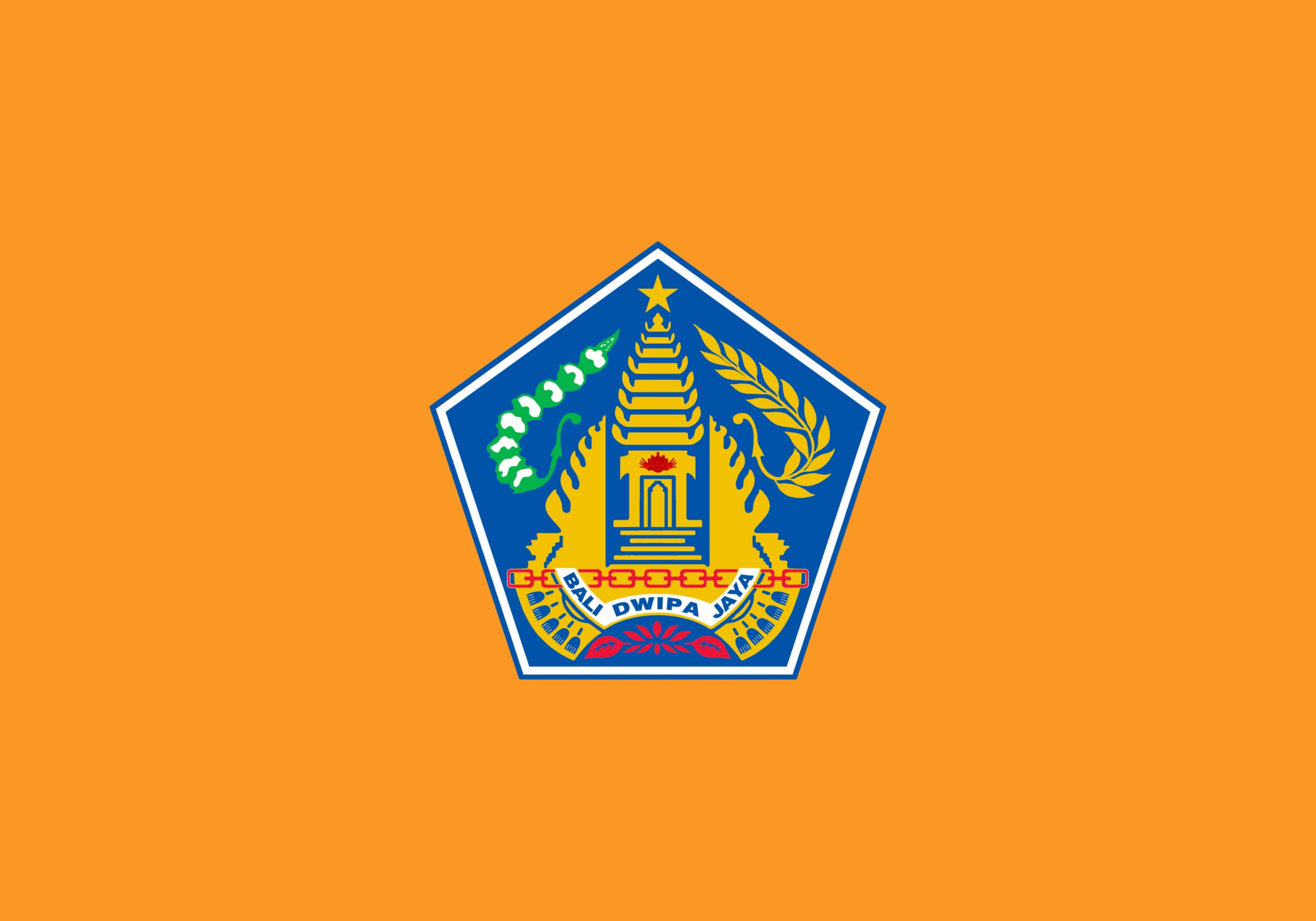
← 2013	27 June 2018	2024 →
- Registered: 3,060,875
- Turnout: 70.11%
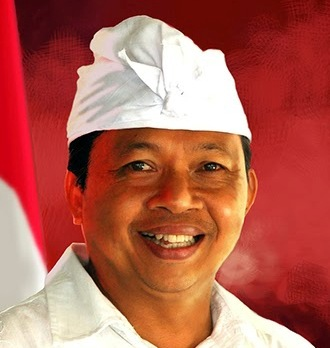

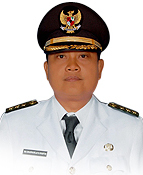
Candidate	I Wayan Koster	Ida Bagus Rai Dharmawijaya Mantra
Party	PDI-P	Independent (Golkar's nominee)
Alliance		Bali People's Coalition
Running mate	Tjokorda Oka Artha Ardana Sukawati	I Ketut Sudikerta
Popular vote	1,213,075	889,930
Percentage	57.68%	42.32%
- Results by city/regency
Governor before election
I Made Mangku Pastika
Democratic
Elected Governor
I Wayan Koster
PDI-P

The 2018 Bali gubernatorial election took place on 27 June 2018 as part of the simultaneous local elections in Indonesia. It was held to elect the governor of Bali along with their deputy for five-year term (2018–2023), whilst members of the Bali Regional House of Representatives (DPRD) will be re-elected in 2019. Candidate I Wayan Koster of the Indonesian Democratic Party of Struggle (PDI-P) won this election defeating the candidate nominated by the Golkar Party Ida Bagus Rai Dharmawijaya Mantra.

Incumbent I Made Mangku Pastika was barred from participating in the re-elections after having served two full terms. Contesting the election were Denpasar's mayor Ida Bagus Rai Dharmawijaya Mantra and House of Representatives member I Wayan Koster.

== Timeline ==
Registration for party-backed candidates were opened between 8 and 10 January 2018, while independent candidates were required to register between 22 and 26 November 2017. The numerical order of the candidates were determined on 13 February through a lottery. The campaigning period would commence between 15 February and 24 June, with a three-day election silence before voting on 27 June.

Up until the registration deadline, no independent candidates registered to contest the election. On 23 April, the regional KPU declared that there will be 2,982,201 eligible voters across the province.

== Candidates ==
Order No.	Candidate	Most recent position	Running mate	Parties (Note: Including parliamentary and non-parliamentary parties)	DPRD seats
1	I Wayan Koster	Member of the House of Representatives (2014–2018)	Tjokorda Oka Artha Ardhana Sukawati	PDI-P; PKB; Hanura; PAN; PKPI	27 / 55
2	Ida Bagus Rai Dharmawijaya Mantra	Mayor of Denpasar (2008–2021)	I Ketut Sudikerta	Golkar; Gerindra; NasDem; Democratic	28 / 55

PDI-P's chairwoman Megawati Soekarnoputri announced third-term House of Representatives (DPR) member I Wayan Koster as the party's candidate for the elections on 11 November 2017. He was part of the 10th commission, which covers education, sports, tourism and creative economy. In the same announcement, former regent of Gianyar Tjokorda Oka Artha Ardana Sukawati (Cok Ace) was endorsed by PDI-P as his running mate. Soon afterwards, the National Mandate Party (PAN) endorsed him as well. Other parties supporting him are the National Awakening Party (PKB), Hanura, and the Indonesian Justice and Unity Party (PKPI).

Ida Bagus Rai Dharmawijaya Mantra (Rai Mantra) initially attempted to register at PDI-P which had supported him in the 2015 Denpasar mayoral election. However, Golkar, whose cadre I Ketut Sudikerta was already the sitting vice-governor, decided to place its support behind the mayor attaching Sudikerta as his running mate after NasDem and Gerindra endorsed Rai Mantra. The Democratic Party also endorsed him.

== Issues ==
I Wayan Koster stated that he would like to see a reform on Indonesia's family planning program which recommends two children per family, saying that it defied Balinese traditions which ideally has four children. Rai Mantra stated that if elected, he would consistently oppose the reclamation program in Benoa Bay.

== Election results ==
Results by Regency/City

Gubernatorial Candidates-Vice Gubernatorial Candidates	Votes	
Gubernatorial Candidates-Vice Gubernatorial Candidates	Voters	%
Koster - Ace	1,213,075	57.68%
Mantra - Kerta	889,930	42.32%
Number of valid votes	2,103,005	97.99%
Invalid votes	43,088	2.01%
Number of valid and invalid votes	2,146,093	100.00%
Voter turnout	2,146,093	70.11%
Registered voters	3,060,875	100.00%
Source		

Vote Acquisition per Regency
Region	KBS-Ace	Mantra-Kerta	Valid votes	Invalid votes	Total
Badung Regency	210,175 (74.94%)	70,290 (25.06%)	280,465	3,626	284,091
Bangli Regency	96,327 (66.32%)	48,917 (33.68%)	145,244	2,504	147,748
Buleleng Regency	220,923 (69.09%)	98,859 (30.91%)	319,782	4,778	324,560
Gianyar Regency	186,076 (64.76%)	101,256 (35.24%)	287,332	12,751	300,083
Jembrana Regency	81,783 (52.91%)	72,801 (47.09%)	154,584	1,635	156,219
Karangasem Regency	90,891 (40.63%)	132,795 (59.37%)	223,686	5,028	228,714
Klungkung Regency	39,653 (32.80%)	81,232 (67.20%)	120,885	4,279	125,164
Tabanan Regency	199,384 (68.14%)	93,246 (31.86%)	292,630	3,765	296,395
Denpasar City	87,863 (31.56%)	190,534 (68.44%)	278,397	4,722	283,119
Total	1,213,075 (57.68%)	889,930 (42.32%)	2,103,005	43,088	2,146,093
