= 2024 Bali gubernatorial election =

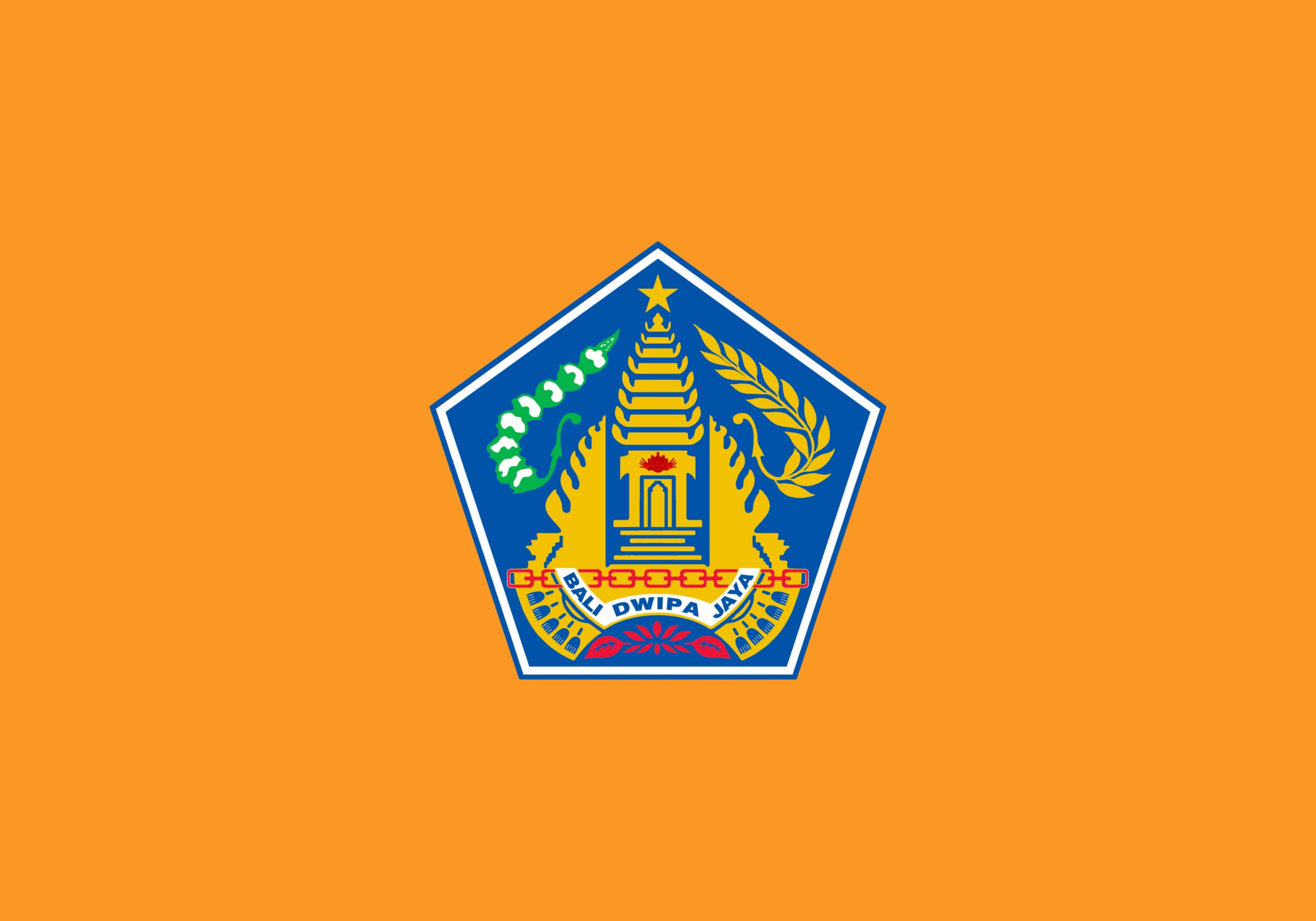
- 27 November 2024
- Registered: 3,283,893
- Turnout: 72.00% (▲1.89pp)
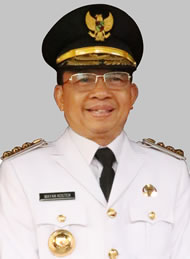

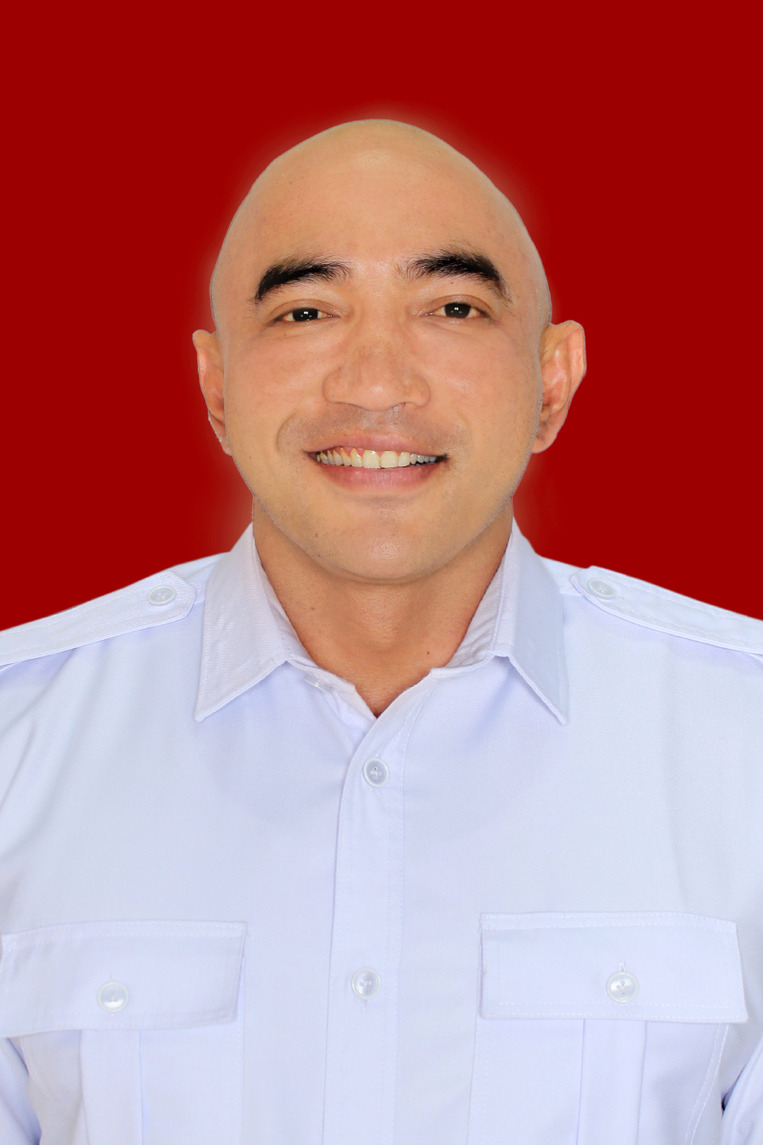
Candidate	I Wayan Koster	Made Muliawan Arya
Party	PDI-P	Gerindra
Alliance	Bali Angunggah Shanti	KIM Plus
Running mate	I Nyoman Giri Prasta	Putu Agus Suradnyana
popular vote	1,413,604	886,251
Percentage	61.46%	38.54%
- Results by city/regency and district (Interactive version)
Governor before election
Sang Made Mahendra Jaya (acting)
Independent
Elected Governor
I Wayan Koster
PDI-P

The 2024 Bali gubernatorial election was held on 27 November 2024, as part of 2024 Indonesian local elections across Indonesia, to elect both the governor and vice governor of Bali for a five-year term (2025-2030). Former governor I Wayan Koster of the Indonesian Democratic Party of Struggle (PDI-P) elected for a second term.

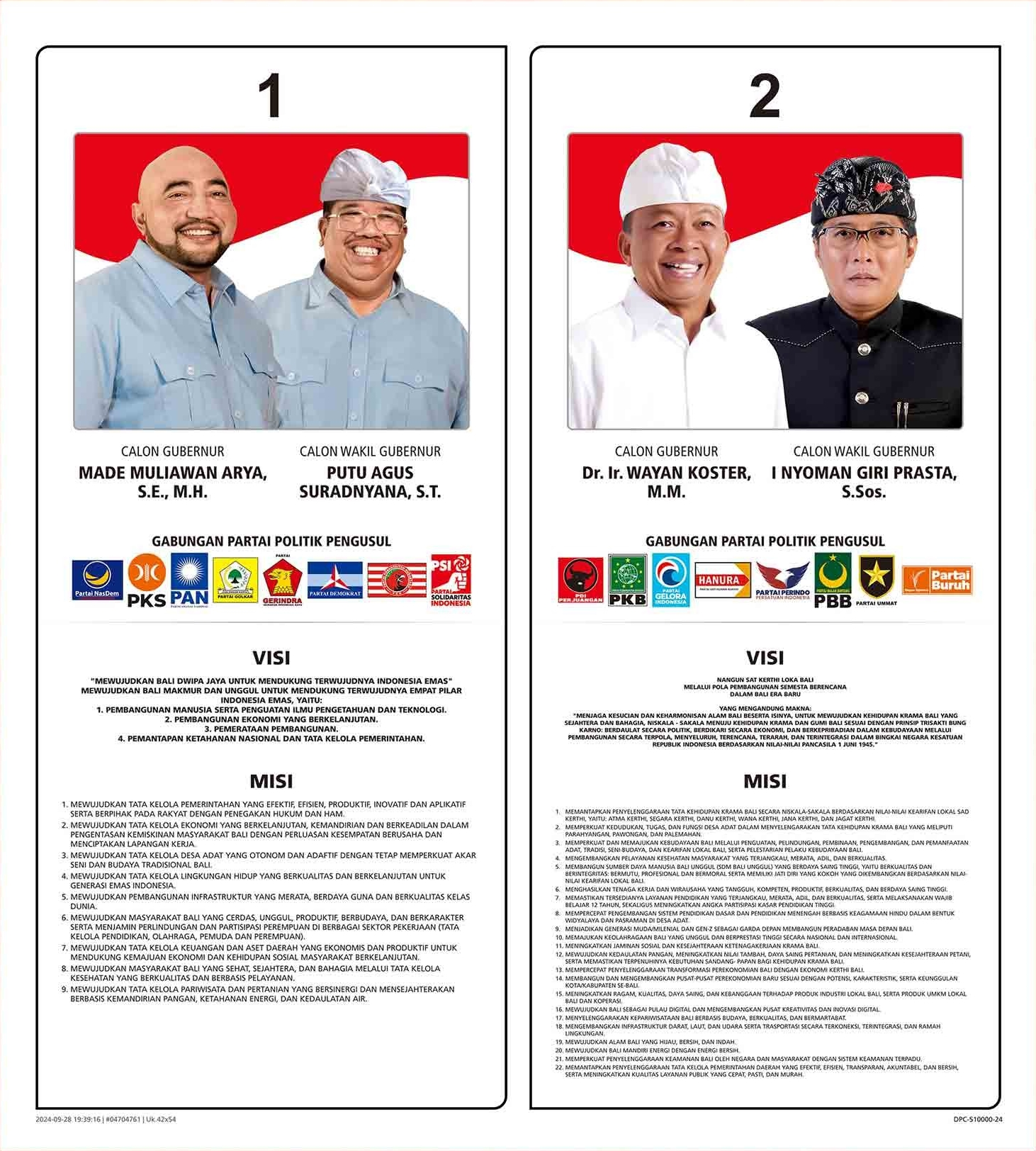
Photos of candidates for governor and vice governor candidate election, showing the nominating and supporting parties logos and visions and missions of the candidates in the Indonesian language.

The 2024 Bali gubernatorial election competition was enlivened by two gubernatorial candidates, one of whom has a boxing background and a regional leader of the Gerindra Party of Bali, namely Made Muliawan Arya known as De Gadjah to Make Bali Great Again, supported by several different parties that were members of the national alliance Advanced Indonesia Coalition+, including Gerindra, Golkar, Democratic, NasDem and PSI. Meanwhile, the other candidate was the former governor of Bali, I Wayan Koster, who was controversial because of his rejection of the Israeli national team at the U20 World Cup in Bali in 2023, Koster was again supported by the Indonesian Democratic Party of Struggle (PDI-P) and other parties that alliance with the PDI-P in Bali. For the result, I Wayan Koster defeated Made Muliawan Arya in the election, winning more than 61% of the vote.

== Electoral system ==
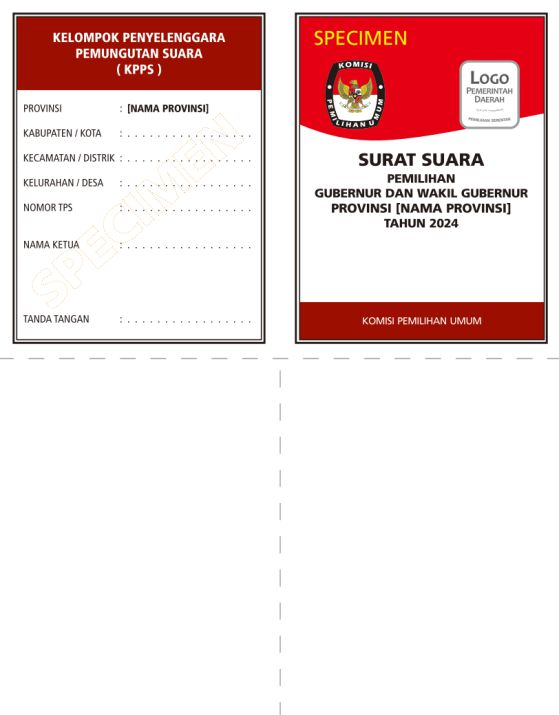
Ballot design to elect governor and vice governor

The election, like other Indonesian local elections in 2024, followed the first-past-the-post system where the candidate with the most votes wins the election, even if they do not win a majority. It was possible for a candidate to run uncontested, in which case the candidate was still required to win a majority of votes "against" an "empty box" option. Should the candidate fail to do so, the election would be repeated at a later date.

== Political map ==
Following the 2024 Indonesian general election, there is six political parties were represented in the Bali Regional House of Representatives (DPRD):

Political parties	Seats count
Indonesian Democratic Party of Struggle (PDI-P)	32 / 55
Great Indonesia Movement Party (Gerindra)	10 / 55
Party of Functional Groups (Golkar)	7 / 55
Democratic Party (Demokrat)	3 / 55
NasDem Party (NasDem)	2 / 55
Indonesian Solidarity Party (PSI)	1 / 55

The results of the legislative election 2024 in Bali Province show 6 political parties with a total of 55 seats in the Bali Provincial DPRD. The initial rule was that political parties or coalitions of political parties could nominate candidate pairs for Governor and Deputy Governor if they met the threshold of 25% of the total valid votes or 20% of seats in the Bali Provincial DPRD, 11 seats out of 55 seats. Only PDI-P can nominate its own candidate without having to form a coalition/alliance.

On August 20, 2024, the Constitutional Court (MK) issued MK Decision No. 60/PUU-XXII/2024 and the Constitutional Court decision No. 70/PUU-XXII/2024 which granted part of the lawsuit filed by Labour Party and Gelora Party against the Regional Election Law. 5 Constitutional Court Decision: Political Parties Without Seats Can Nominate Candidates up to the Age of Regional Heads even though they do not have DPRD seats with the threshold regulated according to the requirements. The DPT in Bali Province is 3,269,516 voters, so according to the regulation, Provinces with a population listed on the permanent voter list of more than 2,000,000 (two million) people up to 6,000,000 (six million) people, Political Parties Participating in the Election or a Coalition of Political Parties Participating in the Election must obtain at least 8.5% (eight and a half percent) of valid votes in the province to complete the candidate pair for governor and deputy governor. Based on these regulations and following the results of the 2024 Election, there are 3 political parties that can nominate their own candidates without having to form a coalition, namely PDI-P (57.18%), Gerindra Party (12.83%), and Golkar Party (12.75%).

The following is the votes acquisition and seats acquisition of the Bali Regional House of Representatives as a result of the 2024 general election.

Ballot Number	Political parties	Vote acquisition		Seats acquisition	Seat changes (2019)
3	PDI-P	1,446,583	57.18%	32 / 55	▼1
2	Gerindra	324,648	12.83%	10 / 55	▲4
4	Golkar	322,569	12.75%	7 / 55	▼1
14	Democratic	152,506	6.03%	3 / 55	▼1
5	NasDem	85,335	3.37%	2 / 55	Steady
15	PSI	52,517	2.08%	1 / 55	Steady
1	PKB	47,774	1.89%	0 / 55	
8	PKS	21,279	0.84%	0 / 55	
7	Gelora	18,375	0.73%	0 / 55	
10	Hanura	16,885	0.67%	0 / 55	▼1
17	PPP	8,829	0.35%	0 / 55	
6	Labour	8,573	0.34%	0 / 55	
16	Perindo	7,573	0.30%	0 / 55	
9	PKN	6,922	0.27%	0 / 55	
12	PAN	3,825	0.15%	0 / 55	
11	Garuda	3,125	0.12%	0 / 55	
24	Ummah	1,709	0.07%	0 / 55	
13	PBB	914	0.04%	0 / 55	
Total		2,529,941	100.00%	55	

== Candidates ==
=== Gerindra Party and others ===
Gerindra Party had confirmed that Made Muliawan Arya would ran as a gubernatorial candidate in the 2024 Bali gubernatorial election, Made Muliawan Arya ultimately accompanied by Putu Agus Suradnyana who is the former regent of Buleleng for two terms. Made Muliawan Arya was often compared to various other political figures in Bali, including Ida Bagus Rai Mantra the previous gubernatorial candidate in 2018 and former mayor of Denpasar, and I Nyoman Giri Prasta the incumbent regent of Badung. Since the previous July 2024, there had been a lot of support for the Made Muliawan Arya-Putu Agus Suradnyana pair which is known as the Mulia-PAS pair, starting with support from several prominent figures including famous artists. The pair were inaugurated on August 25, 2024, and continued with official registration at the General Elections Commission (KPU) of Bali. The pair has a visions:

Realizing Bali Dwipa Jaya to Support the Realization of Golden Indonesia

Realizing a Prosperous and Superior Bali to Support the Realization of the Four Pillars of Golden Indonesia, namely:

1. Human Development and Strengthening of Science and Technology
2. Sustainable Economic Development
3. Equitable Development
4. Strengthening National Resilience and Governance

The pair was supported by a most of the member parties in the Advanced Indonesia Coalition+ with the six parliamentary parties in the Bali Regional House of Representatives (DPRD) controlling 23/55 of seats (42%) namely the Gerindra Party (10 seats), Golkar (7 seats), Democratic (3 seats), NasDem (2 seats) and (PSI) (1 seat) and three supporting non-parliamentary parties that do not control any seats in the DPRD, namely the Prosperous Justice Party (PKS), the National Mandate Party (PAN), and the Nusantara Awakening Party (PKN) and officially became competitors for the pair of the single nominated party of PDI-P

=== Nominees ===
1
2024 Advanced Indonesia Coalition Plus ticket
Made Muliawan Arya	Putu Agus Suradnyana
for Governor	for Vice Governor
	Border
Deputy Speaker of the Denpasar City Regional House of Representatives (2014–2024); Regional Leadership Council (DPD) of the Gerindra Party of Bali (2021–present)	Regent of Buleleng (2012–2022)
Parties
23 / 55 (42%) Gerindra (10 seats); Golkar (7 seats); Democratic (3 seats); NasDem (2 seats); PSI (1 seat)

The pair of Made Muliawan Arya and Putu Agus Suradnyana is known as Mulia-PAS pair.

=== PDI-P ===
The recommendation from the Indonesian Democratic Party of Struggle (PDI-P) Center was only issued on August 23, 2024, supporting again I Wayan Koster as a candidate for governor and supporting I Nyoman Giri Prasta as the candidate for vice governor.

PDI-P is no longer nominating Tjokorda Oka Artha Ardana Sukawati (Cok Ace) as a candidate for vice governor to accompany Koster, who can actually still be nominated to run for the second term. Koster-Giri pair was officially registered with the KPU on August 29. The pair have a vision:

Building Sat Kerthi Loka Bali which means maintaining the sanctity and harmony of the Balinese environment and its contents, to realize a prosperous and happy Balinese life, both physically and mentally.

Koster-Giri was supported by an alliance of political parties in Bali with the only one parliamentary party (PDI-P) controlling 31 seats (56%) in the Bali Regional House of Representatives (DPRD) and seven supporting non-parliamentary parties not controlling any seats in the DPRD, namely the National Awakening Party (PKB), the Indonesian People's Wave Party (Gelora), the People's Conscience Party (Hanura), the Indonesian Unity Party (Perindo), the Crescent Star Party (PBB), the United Development Party (PPP), the Ummah Party, and the Labour Party, the alliance is known as Bali Angunggah Shanti or Nangun Sat Kerthi Loka Bali.

=== Nominees ===
2
2024 Indonesian Democratic Party of Struggle ticket
I Wayan Koster	I Nyoman Giri Prasta
for Governor	for Vice Governor
Governor of Bali (2018–2023); Member of the House Representatives (2004–2018)	Regent of Badung (2016–2024)
Parties
31 / 55 (56%) PDI-P (31 seats)

== Debates ==
The General Elections Commission (KPU) planned three debates to be attended by the 2024 Bali gubernatorial election participants. The first debate was held on October 30, the second debate on November 9, and the third debate on November 20. The KPU then announced a change in schedule; the second debate was postponed four days from the previous schedule, and the second debate was postponed to November 9 because on the 13th all stations were required to follow the North Sumatra debate. The Bali gubernatorial election debate would be broadcast live on the Bali KPU YouTube channel. The exchange of ideas between the two candidate pairs would last for 120 minutes, consisting of 100 minutes of debate and 20 minutes of advertising. It will run from 19.00 to 21.00.

In its inaugural discussion, the Bali KPU set the theme of the tourism sector discussion as "Formatting Bali Towards Sustainable Tourism". Sub-themes include security, law and public order (kamtibmas), environmental issues and spatial planning, cultural resilience, infrastructure and transportation facilities, and tourism economy.

The second discussion will focus on regional autonomy with the theme "Responding to the Dynamics of Regional Autonomy in Bali". This will discuss the relationship between the central and regional governments, regional taxes and levies, collaborative or pentahelix governance, innovation in developing local revenue sources, and human resource development.

In the third debate, the Bali KPU set the theme "Ngardi Bali sané Shanti lan Jagadhita" ("Realizing a Peaceful and Prosperous Bali"), which will discuss the issues of workers, women, children and marginalized groups. The third debate is also related to smart agriculture. digitalization of public services and education, and physical and mental health.

No.	Day and date	Venue	Theme	Panelists	Moderator	Announcer (official)	Debate participation			
P Participant N Nonparticipant							Candidate pair 1		Candidate pair 2	
P Participant N Nonparticipant							Made Muliawan Arya	Putu Agus Suradnyana	I Wayan Koster	I Nyoman Giri Prasta
1	Wednesday, October 30, 2024	Prime Plaza Hotel Sanur	"Formatting Bali Towards Sustainable Tourism": Law and security public order (kamtibmas); Pikobet weakening and spatial planning; Cultural resilience; Infrastructure and transportation facilities; Economy and tourism.	Nyoman Sri Subawa; I Gedé Suwindia; Anak Agung Istri Ari Atu Dewi; Anak Agung Putu Agung Suryawan Wiranatha; Agoes Ganesha Rahyuda; I Madé Rai Ridharta; Madé Krisna Dinata	Happy Goeritman; Okky Satrial SY	TVRI Bali; RRI	P	P	P	P
2	Monday, November 9, 2023	Bali Beach Convention	"Responding to the Dynamics of Regional Autonomy in Bali": Regional taxes and levies; Collaborative governance or pentahelix; Innovation in promoting local revenue sources; Human Resource Development (Human Resources)	Bambang Callitus; Adisty Larasati	TVRI Bali; RRI		P	P	P	P
3	Wednesday, 20 November 2024	Bali Nusa Dua Convention Center	"Ngardi Bali sané Shanti lan Jagadhita": Employment; Women; Young people; Sekaa marginal; Smart agriculture; Digitalization public fatherhood and education; Physical and mental health	Ni Nyoman Déwi Pascarani; I Ketut Satriawan; Gedé Sedana; Ni Luh Kartini; I Nengah Sujaya; Luh Riniti Rahayu; Anak Ayu Sri Wahyuni	Davie Pratama; Fanni Imaniar	TVRI Bali; RRI	P	P	P	P

== Controversies ==
=== Debate ===
In one of the debates, candidate pair number 1, Made Muliawan Arya and Putu Agus Suradnyana (Mulia-PAS), touched on candidate pair number 2, I Wayan Koster and I Nyoman Giri Prasta (Giri-Prasta), for rejecting the presence of the Israeli national team in Bali at the 2023 FIFA U-20 World Cup. De Gadjah said that sport should not be mixed with politics, this immediately made the audience cheer and sparked chaos and disputes between supporters of the two candidate pairs.

=== Fraud voting video ===
In Karangasem Regency of Bali, on the voting day, a viral video circulated on social media, in which someone voted for four ballots for the Bali gubernatorial election alone. From the results of the temporary investigation, it was suspected that the action of residents who voted for five ballots occurred at one of the polling stations in Sangkan Gunung Village, Sidemen, Karangasem District, Bali.

=== Reports of fraud from each candidate pair ===
Candidate pair Made Muliawan Arya-Putu Agus Suradnyana (Mulia-PAS) reported candidate pair I Wayan Koster I Nyoman Giri Prasta to the General Elections Supervisory Body (Bawaslu). Mulia-PAS through its legal team reported three alleged election violations to the General Elections Supervisory Body in the form of special financial assistance funds (BKK), meetings with community organizations during the quiet period, and alleged deployment of ASN. Koster-Giri's legal team also submitted a report to the Bali Police regarding the distribution of cheap rice and coupons in the 2024 Bali gubernatorial election.

=== Inauguration schedule ===
Acting Governor of Bali Sang Made Mahendra Jaya insisted that the gubernatorial inauguration would still be held on February 7 even though there was still a lawsuit process at the Constitutional Court (MK). The inauguration will be held on March 13, 2025.

Meanwhile, the governor-elect and vice governor-elect I Wayan Koster and I Nyoman Giri Prasta said that they had no problem if the governor's inauguration was postponed from February 7-6 to February 18-20 2025.

== Results ==
Candidate	Running mate	Party	Votes	%
I Wayan Koster	I Nyoman Giri Prasta	Indonesian Democratic Party of Struggle	1,413,604	61.46
Made Muliawan Arya	Putu Agus Suradnyana	Gerindra Party	886,251	38.54
Total			2,299,855	100.00
Valid votes			2,299,855	97.27
Invalid/blank votes			64,620	2.73
Total votes			2,364,475	100.00
Registered voters/turnout			3,283,893	72.00
Source: General Elections Commission

=== Results by city/regency ===
General Elections Commission official results

City/Regency	①		②		Valid		Invalid		Total votes	Turnout	
City/Regency	Votes	%	Votes	%	Votes	%	Votes	%	Total votes	Voters	%
Badung Regency	111,062	35.23%	204,186	64.77%	315,248	97.72%	7,354	2.28%	322,602	412,434	78.22%
Bangli Regency	37,298	24.96%	112,125	75.04%	149,423	97.13%	4,422	2.87%	153,845	196,044	78.47%
Buleleng Regency	153,444	42.69%	206,028	57.31%	359,472	97.98%	7,396	2.02%	366,868	594,619	61.70%
Gianyar Regency	90,362	28.79%	223,469	71.21%	313,831	96.92%	9,981	3.08%	323,812	392,342	82.53%
Jembrana Regency	73,468	43.00%	97,402	57.00%	170,870	97.88%	3,692	2.12%	174,562	244,978	71.26%
Karangasem Regency	125,986	45.72%	149,560	54.28%	275,546	96.31%	10,557	3.69%	286,103	392,702	72.85%
Klungkung Regency	48,841	40.74%	71,044	59.26%	119,885	96.66%	4,138	3.34%	124,023	168,793	73.48%
Denpasar City	145,440	49.95%	145,759	50.05%	291,199	96.24%	11,378	3.76%	302,577	507,561	59.61%
Tabanan Regency	100,350	32.97%	204,031	67.03%	304,381	98.16%	5,702	1.84%	310,083	374,420	82.82%
Total	886,251	38.54%	1,413,604	61.46%	2,299,855	97.27%	64,620	2.73%	2,364,475	3,283,893	72.00%
Source: General Elections Commission

== Response ==
=== Candidate 01 ===
Candidate for governor Made Muliawan Arya revealed the results of his team's internal calculations. Muliawan said that the vote tally of Made Muliawan Arya-Putu Agus Suradnyana (Mulia-PAS) was far behind pair number 2, I Wayan Koster-I Nyoman Giri Prasta (Koster-Giri). De Gadjah then congratulated the Koster-Giri candidate. He hoped that the candidate pairs who were his rivals in the 2024 Bali gubernatorial election would fulfill the promises made during the campaign. De Gadjah did not detail the results of the internal calculations carried out by his winning team. Even so, he said the chance for the Mulia-PAS candidate to catch up with their rivals was very small. He also accepted gracefully the results of the 2024 Bali gubernatorial election even though there had been no official decision from the KPU. He respected and appreciated the decisions of the Balinese people.

== Determination and inauguration ==
I Wayan Koster; Governor-elect	I Nyoman Giri Prasta; Vice governor-elect

The candidate pair number 2, I Wayan Koster and I Nyoman Giri Prasta, were officially appointed as governor and vice governor of Bali elected by the KPU of Bali Province in an Open Plenary Meeting on January 9 2025 based on Bali Province General Election Commissions Decision Number 26 of 2025. They were inaugurated by the president of Indonesia Prabowo Subianto at National Palace, Jakarta on February 20, 2025 together with all elected regional heads (governors, mayors and regents) across Indonesia.

== Gallery ==
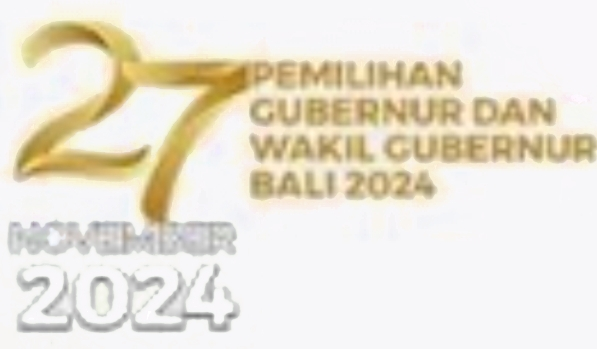
Election logo

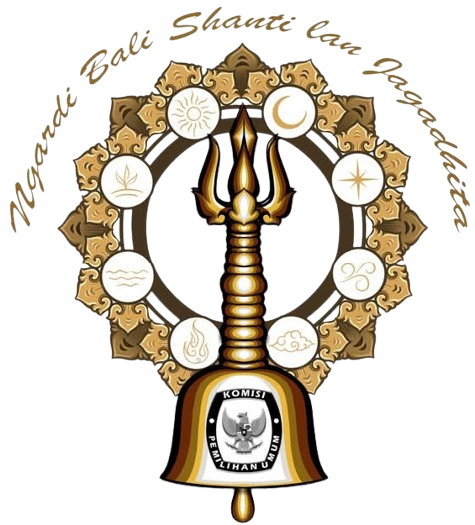
Election mascot, a Genta

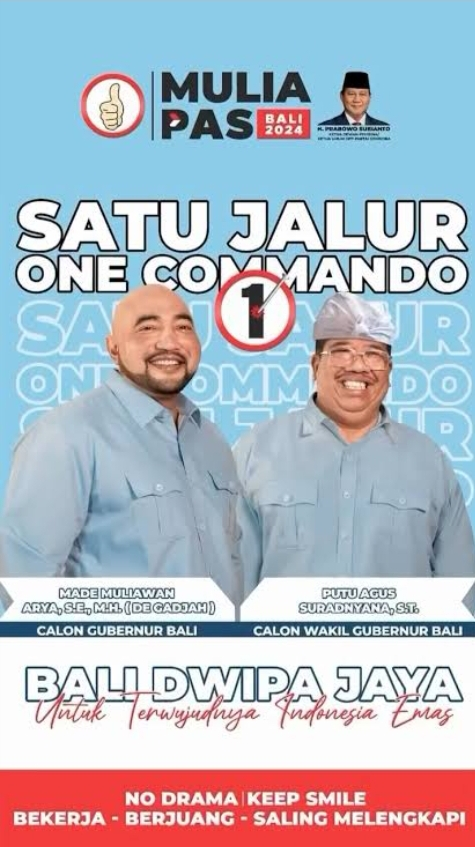
Campaign poster of Made Muliawan Arya and Putu Agus Suradnyana

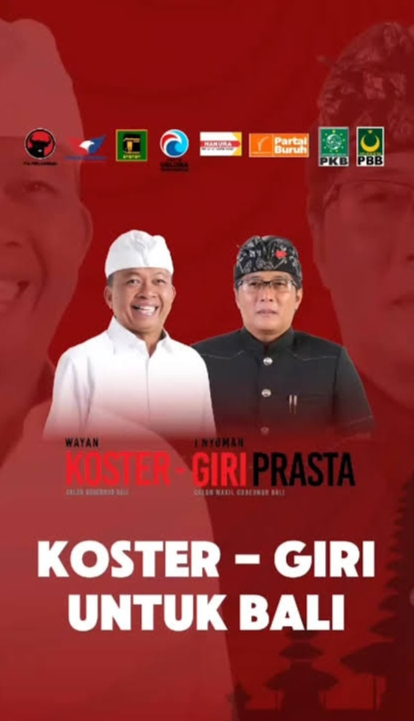
Campaign poster of I Wayan Koster and I Nyoman Giri Prasta
