= Ida Bagus Mantra =

Indonesian politician

- ᬇᬤᬩᬕᬸᬲ᭄ᬫᬦ᭄ᬢ᭄ᬭ
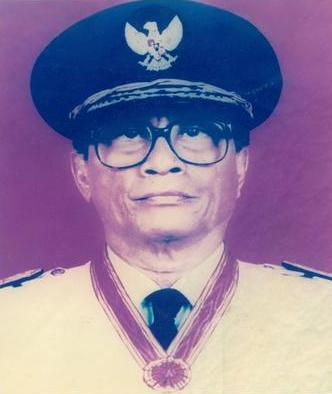
- Official portrait, 1978

4th Governor of Bali
- In office 27 August 1978 – 27 August 1988
- President: Suharto
- Vice Governor: I Dewa Gde Oka
- Preceded by: Sukarmen
- Succeeded by: Ida Bagus Oka

Personal details
- Born: 8 May 1928 Badung, Bali, Dutch East Indies
- Died: 10 July 1995 (aged 67) Bali, Indonesia
- Party: Golkar
- Children: 4 (including Ida Bagus Rai Mantra)
- Education: Visva-Bharati University

Ida Bagus Mantra (Balinese: ᬇᬤᬩᬕᬸᬲ᭄ᬫᬦ᭄ᬢ᭄ᬭ; 8 May 1928 – 10 July 1995) was the fourth governor of Bali from 1978 to 1988. He later served as Indonesia's ambassador to India. He also served as a member of the House of Representatives in 1968. He is the father of Ida Bagus Rai Mantra, former mayor of Denpasar from 2010 to 2015.

Ida Bagus Mantra replaced Ida Bagus Oka as governor of Bali

== Biography ==
=== Early life and education ===
Ida Bagus Mantra was born on May 8, 1928. His father, Ida Bagus Rai, was a pedanda (Hindu religious leader) in Gria Kedaton. The spiritual atmosphere in Gria formed Ida Bagus Mantra's identity and character as a polite and religious person.

In his life journey, Ida Bagus Mantra studied Eastern literature at AMS (Algemeene Middelbare School) Makasar (1947-1949), then continued his studies at Visva-Bharati University, Shantiniketan, West Bengal, India; a college founded by Rabindranath Tagore. He earned his master's degree in 1954, while he earned his doctorate in 1957 with a dissertation entitled "Hindu Literature and Religion in Indonesia".

=== Udayana University ===
Ida Bagus Mantra is the figure behind the establishment of the Udayana Faculty of Letters, a branch of Airlangga University Surabaya, which was inaugurated on September 29, 1958. The Udayana Faculty of Letters is expected to be a source of inspiration and motivation in exploring and maintaining Balinese culture. In 1962-1964, Prof. Dr. Ida Bagus Mantra was appointed as Dean of the Faculty of Letters in addition to actively participating in midwifery Udayana University Denpasar. That is why he was later trusted to serve as the first Rector of Udayana University (1964-1968) where "Culture" was made the main characteristic of the Main Scientific Pattern at Udayana University Denpasar. Furthermore, Ida Bagus Mantra also initiated the formation of Maha Widya Bhawana Hindu Dharma Institute (IHD) on October 3, 1963, which is now Hindu University of Indonesia Denpasar. In addition, Ida Bagus Mantra is also recorded as one of the founders of Parisada Hindu Dharma Bali, on February 23, 1959 at a meeting at the Faculty of Letters Udayana, which was the forerunner of Parisada Hindu Dharma Indonesia as the highest assembly of Hindus in Indonesia.

=== Director General of Culture ===
Ida Bagus Mantra was then trusted by the government to serve as Director General of Culture of the Department of Education and Culture for a period of ten years (1968-1978). During his decade of leadership as Director General of Culture, Ida Bagus Mantra, showed his real role for Bali such as; development, renovation of temples, including Besakih Temple, Pulaki Temple and others and building cultural activity centers such as the construction of the Denpasar Cultural Park (Denpasar Art Center), the construction of cultural centers in several districts such as Buleleng Regency and Gianyar Regency also exploring, enriching, arts and culture that are almost extinct or still developing in society; and encouraging the construction and rehabilitation of museums and antiquities.

=== Governor of Bali ===
Prof. Dr. Ida Bagus Mantra was appointed as Governor of Bali in 1978. In the first year of his term, Ida Bagus Mantra rolled out a policy to establish Balinese Culture inspired by Hindu values as the basic capital for the development of the Bali region and then launched the Bali Arts Festival (PKB) program which is held for a full month every year with a colossal Balinese arts and culture festival and an exhibition of artists' works including the results of the folk craft industry, which continues to be an annual tradition in Bali to this day.

As Governor of Bali, Ida Bagus Mantra, clearly embodied the philosophy of local wisdom Tri Hita Karana in development in Bali. The implementation of this philosophy is evident in the construction of offices or buildings in Bali which are arranged with concepts and forms with Balinese architectural nuances and also enforced the stipulation that the construction of office buildings, hotels and others must not exceed the height of a coconut tree.

Other matters concerning his policies as governor are about the development of tourism with a Balinese cultural perspective, traditional village competitions and subak competitions throughout Bali, and placing traditional villages/pakraman as traditional institutions with spiritual and cultural nuances as central and strategic institutions in conceptualizing and activating Tri Hita Karana in the daily lives of the Balinese people. This policy is manifested in the form of Regional Regulation (Perda) number 06 of 1986 concerning the Position, Function and Role of Traditional Villages whose existence has a legal basis. In addition, he also issued a policy in the form of a Perda that underlines the existence of LPD in Bali by referring to LPD as a Savings and Loan Business Entity owned by traditional villages whose main function and purpose is to encourage the economic development of village communities through targeted savings and effective capital distribution. Which means that the regional regulation states that traditional villages are designated as the owners and managers of LPD. LPD has a role as an institution that plays a role in improving people's welfare through people's economic development, in addition to LPD as a source of original income for traditional villages, because in the regulation it is stipulated that 20% of the profits obtained by LPD are allocated for improving the empowerment of traditional villages.

=== Ambassadors Extraordinary in India ===
After retiring as Governor of Bali, Prof. Dr. Ida Bagus Mantra was entrusted to hold the position of Ambassador Extraordinary in India for a three-year term (1989-1992). After his term of service as ambassador ended and his term of service as a professor of cultural history at the Faculty of Letters, Udayana University, Denpasar in 1993. Ida Bagus Mantra was entrusted as a member of the Supreme Advisory Council in 1993.

== Death ==
He died on 10 July 1995, of kidney disease.

Political offices
Preceded by Sukarmen	Governor of Bali; 1978–1988	Succeeded by Ida Bagus Oka
