= I Gusti Ayu Bintang Darmawati =

Indonesian politician

- ᬇᬕᬸᬲ᭄ᬢᬶᬅᬬᬸᬩᬶᬦ᭄ᬢᬂᬤᬃᬫᬯᬢᬶ
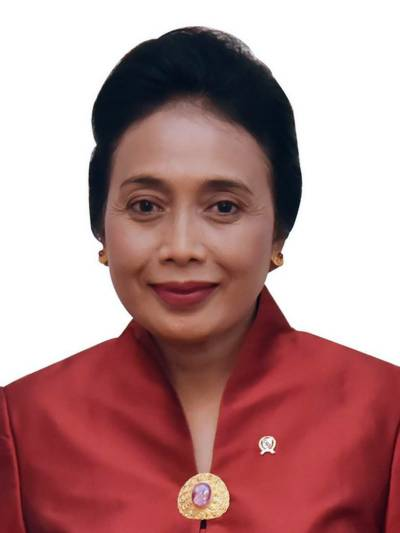
- Official portrait, 2019

10th Minister of Women Empowerment and Child Protection
- In office 23 October 2019 – 20 October 2024
- President: Joko Widodo
- Preceded by: Yohana Yembise
- Succeeded by: Arifah Choiri Fauzi

Personal details
- Born: 24 November 1968 (age 57) Denpasar, Bali, Indonesia
- Citizenship: Indonesian
- Party: PDI-P
- Spouse: Anak Agung Gede Ngurah Puspayoga
- Relations: I Gusti Ngurah Jaya Negara (older brother)
- Children: 1
- Education: Ngurah Rai University; Udayana University
- Cabinet: 41st Cabinet of Indonesia

I Gusti Ayu Bintang Darmawati (Balinese: ᬇᬕᬸᬲ᭄ᬢᬶᬅᬬᬸᬩᬶᬦ᭄ᬢᬂᬤᬃᬫᬯᬢᬶ; born 24 November 1968), also known by her marriage name Bintang Puspayoga is an Indonesian politician who served as the 10th Minister of Women Empowerment and Child Protection from 2019 to 2024 in the 41st Cabinet of Indonesia. She is also the first Balinese woman to become minister in Indonesia.

She is married to Anak Agung Gede Ngurah Puspayoga, a Balinese politician who had been Minister of Cooperatives & SMEs, Vice Governor of Bali, and Mayor of Denpasar. Her brother I Gusti Ngurah Jaya Negara was elected as Mayor of Denpasar in 2021.

Political offices
Preceded by Yohana Yembise	Minister of Women Empowerment and Child Protection; 2019–2024	Succeeded by TBA
