= I Nyoman Giri Prasta =

Vice Governor of Bali since 2025

- ᬇᬜᭀᬫᬦ᭄ᬕᬶᬭᬶᬧ᭄ᬭᬲ᭄ᬢ
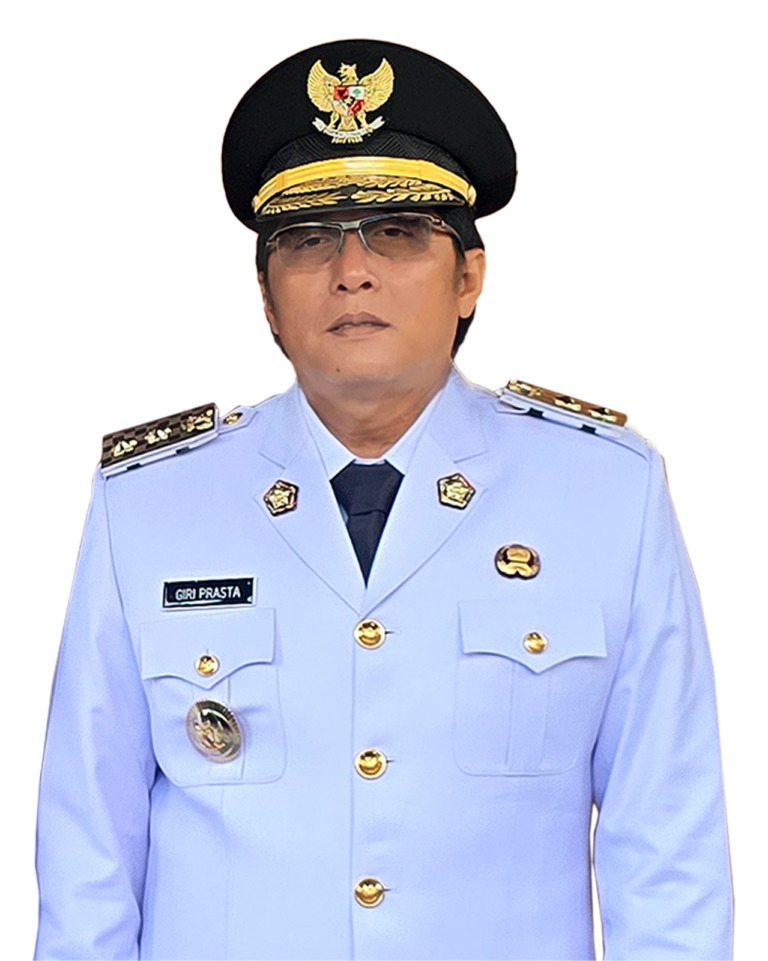
- Official portrait, 2025

10th Vice Governor of Bali
- Incumbent
- Assumed office 20 February 2025
- Governor: I Wayan Koster
- Preceded by: Tjokorda Oka Artha Ardana Sukawati

10th Regent of Badung
- In office 17 February 2016 – 20 February 2025
- Deputy: I Ketut Suiasa
- Preceded by: Yudha Saka (acting); Anak Agung Gde Agung
- Succeeded by: I Wayan Adi Arnawa

Speaker of the Badung Regency Regional House of Representatives
- In office October 6, 2014 – 2015
- Deputy: 2014–2019 period: I Ketut Suiasa; I Made Sunarta
- Succeeded by: I Putu Parwata Maelea Kusuma

Member of the Badung Regency Regional House of Representatives
- In office 2004–2009
- Constituency: Badung III

Personal details
- Born: 19 March 1972 (age 54) Pelaga, Petang, Badung, Bali, Indonesia
- Citizenship: Indonesia
- Party: PDI-P (since 2004)
- Spouse: Ni Kadek Seniasih
- Children: 3
- Education: Public Administration of Social and Politics in Margarana, Tabanan (BSS)
- Occupation: Politician; teacher; researcher
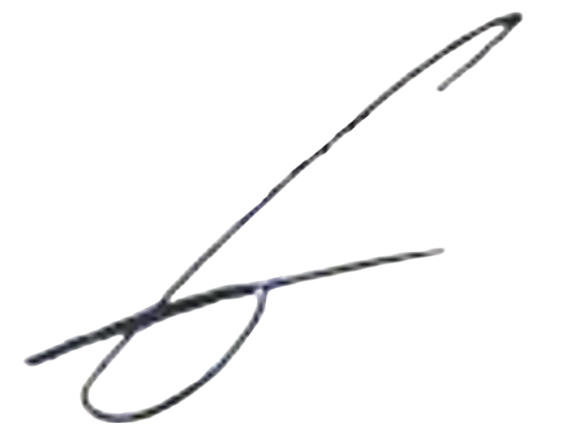
- Signature
- Website: Bali Province Govt. website
- Nicknames: Giri; Nang Oman Giri Prasta; Giri Prasta
- I Nyoman Giri Prasta's voice Giri Prasta Speech; Recorded September 2, 2024

I Nyoman Giri Prasta (Note: /i njoʊˈmɑːn ɡiːr ˈprɑːstə/ EE-nyou-MAHN-GEER-prahs-tah; Indonesian: [i ˌɲoman ˌɡiri ˈprast̪a]; Balinese: [i ˌɲoman ˌɡiri ˈprastə]) (Balinese: ᬇᬜᭀᬫᬦ᭄ᬕᬶᬭᬶᬧ᭄ᬭᬲ᭄ᬢ; born 19 March 1972) is an Indonesian politician who is the 10th vice governor of Bali since February 2025. He is a member of the Indonesian Democratic Party of Struggle (PDI-P), he previously was the 10th regent of Badung from 2016 to 2025.

Giri Prasta was a member and speaker of the Badung Regional House of Representatives (DPRD) from 2004 to 2015. He was a regent of Badung for two terms, Giri Prasta won the 2015 and 2020 Badung regent elections.

== Education and early career ==
Born in Badung, Bali on 19 March 1972, he studied at the Margarana Tabanan College of Social and Political Sciences, Bali. He is the son of Nyoman Sukarta, who works as a mantri, and Ni Ketut Suwiti, who worked as a midwife.

Giri Prasta got a social degree in education, started a career in the education, and then became a politician with joined with the Indonesian Democratic Party of Struggle (PDIP) in 2004.

== Political career ==
=== Parliament ===
Giri Prasta won a seat in the Badung Regency Regional House of Representatives in the 2004–2009 legislative elections, and became the speaker of the House for the 2011–2015 term.

=== Regent of Badung ===
He participated in the Badung regional head election (Pilkada) and won as Regent of Badung for two terms from 2016–2021, and 2021–2025.

He became Regent of Badung after being inaugurated on February 17, 2016, by the Governor of Bali at that time I Made Mangku Pastika at Wisma Sabha, Renon, Denpasar. He ran again in the second round as a candidate for Badung Regent in the Badung Regency Regional Election (Pilkada) in 2020 paired with I Ketut Suiasa against an empty box.

=== 2024 Candidate for Vice Governor of Bali ===
In 2024 Giri Prasta officially ran as a candidate for Vice Governor of Bali accompanying I Wayan Koster in the 2024 Bali gubernatorial election after receiving a recommendation from the PDI-P, some people regretted this decision because they wanted Giri Prasta to be nominated as governor instead of Koster. PDI-P give a recommendation to him because he is considered qualified and better known by the Balinese people than the previous vice governor Cok Ace. During the most of his campaign, Giri Prasta is in the spotlight and receives criticism from the public, Giri Prasta provided a grant to Balinese the incapable traditional villages (desa adat). As a result of the election, both candidate pairs managed to win the election with more than 61% of the vote. Koster-Giri was inaugurated on February 20, 2025.

== Honours ==
=== National Honours ===
- Indonesia: Satyalancana Karya Bhakti Praja Nugraha (30 July 2024)
