= I Gusti Ngurah Jaya Negara =

Indonesian politician (born 1966)

- ᬇᬕᬸᬲ᭄ᬢᬶᬗᬸᬭᬄᬚᬬᬦᬾᬕᬭ
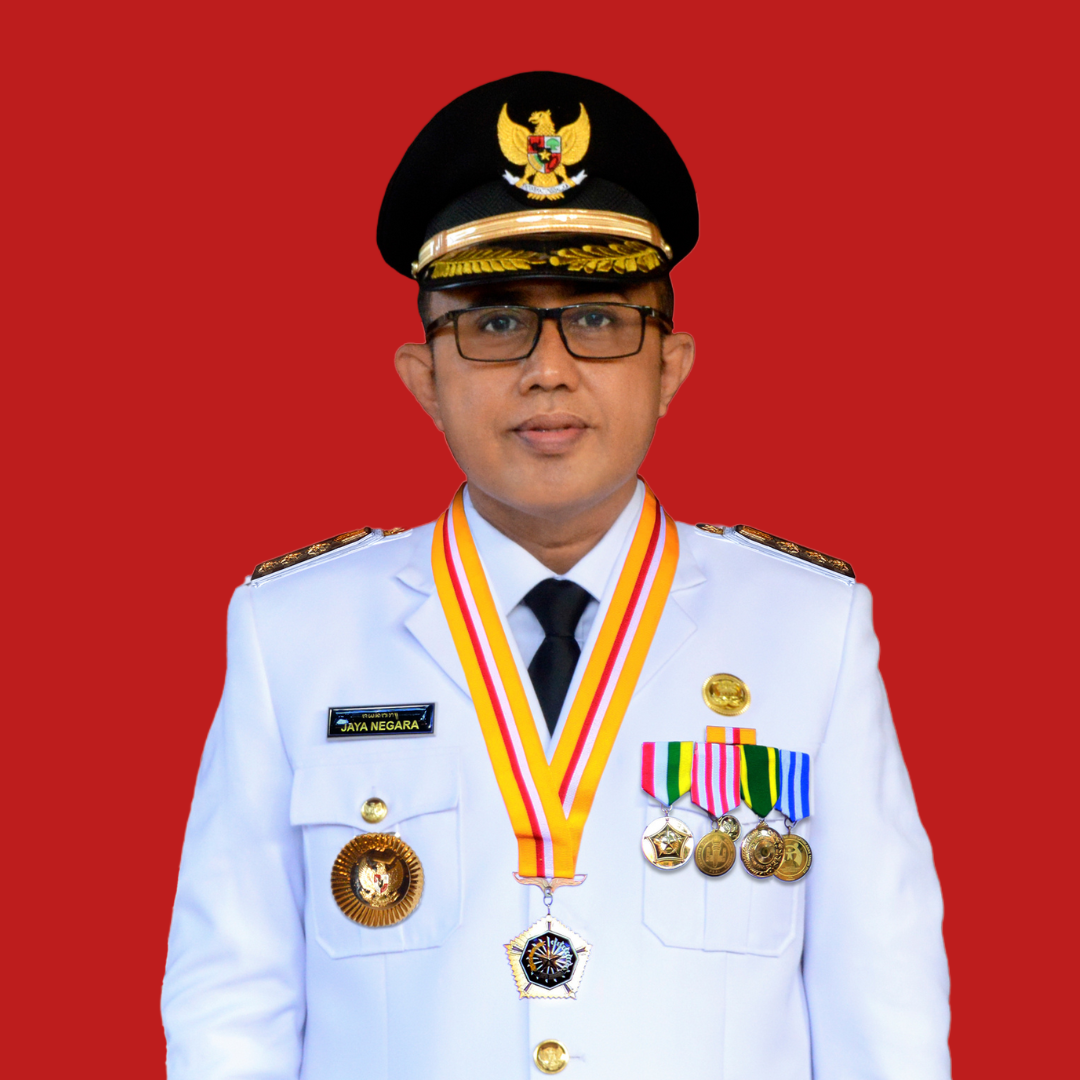
- Official portrait, c. 2021

5th Mayor of Denpasar
- Incumbent
- Assumed office 20 February 2025
- Vice Mayor: I Kadek Agus Arya Wibawa
- Preceded by: Dewa Gede Mahendra Putra (acting)
- In office 26 February 2021 – 26 September 2024
- Vice Mayor: I Kadek Agus Arya Wibawa
- Preceded by: Ida Bagus Rai Mantra
- Succeeded by: Dewa Gede Mahendra Putra (acting)

3th Vice Mayor of Denpasar
- In office 17 February 2016 – 17 February 2021
- In office 11 August 2010 – 11 August 2015
- Mayor: Ida Bagus Rai Mantra

Member of the Denpasar City Regional House of Representatives
- In office 1999–2009

Personal details
- Born: 4 July 1966 (age 60) Penatih, East Denpasar, Denpasar, Bali, Indonesia
- Party: PDI-P
- Spouse: Ni Sagung Made Antari
- Relations: I Gusti Ayu Bintang Darmawati (sister); Anak Agung Gede Ngurah Puspayoga (brother-in-law)
- Children: 1
- Parents: I Gusti Ngurah Gde Sutedja (father); Ni Jero Samiarsa (mother)
- Education: University of National Education (BEc)
- Occupation: Politician
- Profession: Banker
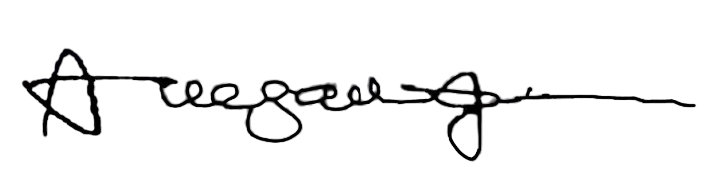
- Signature
- Website: Denpasar City Govt. website

I Gusti Ngurah Jaya Negara (Note: Indonesian: [i ˌɡust̪i ˌŋurah ˌd͡ʒaja nəˈɡara]; Balinese: [i ˌɡusti ˌŋurah ˌd͡ʒajə nəˈɡarə]) (Balinese: ᬇᬕᬸᬲ᭄ᬢᬶᬗᬸᬭᬄᬚᬬᬦᬾᬕᬭ; born 4 July 1966) more colloquially referred to as Gung Jaya or Turah Jayanegara is an Indonesian politician of the Indonesian Democratic Party of Struggle (PDI-P) who is current serving as mayor of Denpasar, Bali. Previously he had served as vice mayor of Denpasar from 2010 to 2015, and was a member of the Denpasar's parliament (DPRD).

Before becoming mayor, He had been the city's vice mayor under Rai Mantra for two terms, from 2010 to 2015 and 2016–2021, and before that he was elected twice to the city's legislature.

== Early life ==
I Gusti Ngurah Jaya Negara was born on 4 July 1966 in Puri Penatih district of Denpasar to I Gusti Ngurah Gde Sutedja and Ni Jero Samiata. His father was a teacher, and his mother was a housewife. He stated that during his childhood, he helped his parents earn money by selling ice pops after school and helping during harvests. His father lost his job as a teacher in 1971 due to his affiliation to the Indonesian National Party, and became an auto rickshaw driver. Jaya Negara graduated from Denpasar's State High School No. 1 in 1985, and in 1991 he graduated with a bachelors in economics from the National Education University in Denpasar. During his studies, his father involved him in the party activities of the Indonesian Democratic Party (PDI).

== Career ==
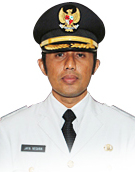
I Gusti Ngurah Jaya Negara as a Vice Mayor of Denpasar

After receiving his degree, Jaya Negara began to work at the private Utama Bank in 1991. The bank failed due to the Asian financial crisis and Jaya Negara was laid off in 1998. Afterwards, he became more active in politics. In the 1999 legislative election shortly after, he was elected as a member of the Denpasar City Regional House of Representatives as a member of the Indonesian Democratic Party of Struggle (PDI-P; a continuation of PDI). He was reelected for a second term in 2004, and became chairman of one of the House's commissions. In 2010, he ran as the vice-mayoral candidate of Ida Bagus Rai Mantra in Denpasar's mayoral election, and the pair won with 72.5% of the votes. They were sworn into office on 11 August 2010. They were reelected in 2015, and were sworn in to their second term on 17 February 2016.

Results of the 2020 Denpasar mayoral election by district and subdistrict

In the 2020 mayoral election, Jaya Negara ran to become the mayor of Denpasar and was elected with 184,655 votes (81.2%) with I Kadek Agus Arya Wibawa as his vice-mayoral candidate. They were sworn in on 26 February 2021. His early tenure as mayor focused on vaccination and economic aid programs in response to the COVID-19 pandemic, in addition to renovations to facilities at Sanur Beach.

== Personal life ==
=== Family ===
Two of his younger siblings are active in politics and government: his sister I Gusti Ayu Bintang Darmawati in 2019 was appointed as Minister of Women Empowerment and Child Protection in Joko Widodo's cabinet, and his brother I Gusti Ngurah Gede Marhaendra Jaya was elected into the Bali Regional House of Representatives as a PDI-P legislator in the 2024 Indonesian legislative election. Through Darmawati, Jaya Negara is brother-in-law of former minister, Bali vice governor, and Denpasar mayor Anak Agung Gede Ngurah Puspayoga.

== Honours ==
=== Honorary sign ===
- Indonesia
  - Satyalancana Karya Bhakti Praja Nugraha – 2024
