= Yohana Yembise =

Indonesian academic and politician

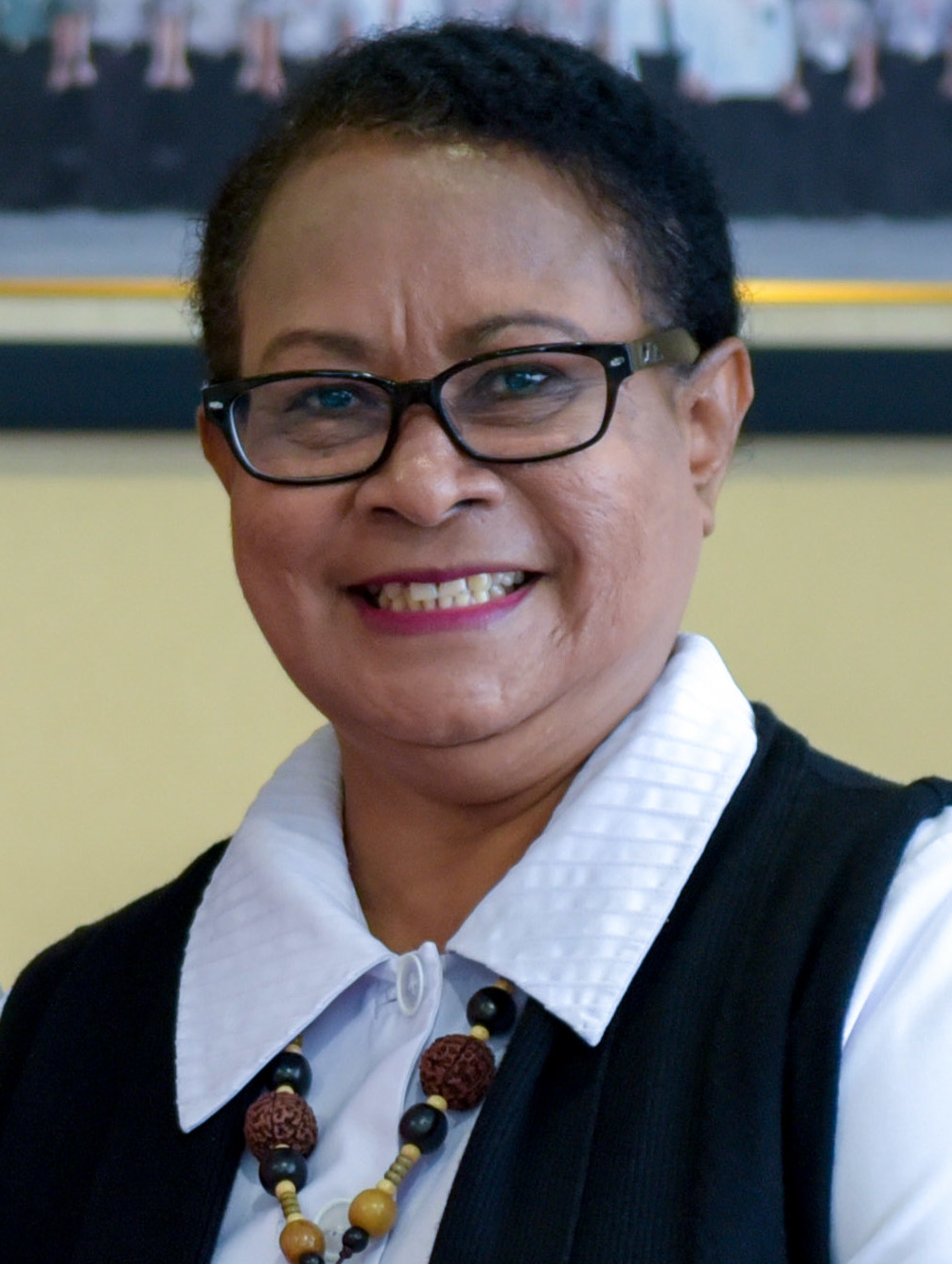
- Yembise in 2017

9th Minister of Women Empowerment and Child Protection
- In office 26 October 2014 – 22 October 2019
- President: Joko Widodo
- Preceded by: Linda Amalia Sari
- Succeeded by: I Gusti Ayu Bintang Darmawati

Personal details
- Born: Yohana Susana Yembise; 1 October 1958 (age 68) Manokwari, Netherlands New Guinea
- Party: Independent
- Spouse: Leo Danuwira
- Education: Cendrawasih University (dra.); Simon Fraser University (M.Sc.); University of Newcastle (Ph.D.)

Yohana Susana Yembise (born 1 October 1958) is an Indonesian academic and politician who served as Minister of Women Empowerment and Child Protection in Joko Widodo's Working Cabinet from 2014 to 2019.

== Early life and education ==
Yembise was born in the city of Manokwari, then part of Netherlands New Guinea, on 1 October 1958. The second child of eleven siblings, Yembise's father was a civil servant for Nabire Regency. Yembise was first educated in Jayapura and later studied in public high schools in Nabire, and was involved in a student exchange to Canada as a senior high schooler.

After completing high school, Yembise went to Cenderawasih University and studied English education, earning her bachelor's degree in 1985. She later went to Singapore and earned a diploma from the Southeast Asian Ministers of Education Organization - Regional English Language Center (SEAMEO RELC). Further on, she studied at Canada's Simon Fraser University for her education masters, graduating in 1994 and later a PhD from Australia's University of Newcastle in 2007.

== Academic career ==
She became a lecturer at Cenderawasih University's faculty of education. She was awarded a doctoral professorship in syllabus design and material development as the first female Papuan to become a professor in Indonesia in November 2012.

In 2011, she was selected as a member of a committee awarding the Australian Development Scholarship for Indonesia. Yembise noted that her team at Cenderawasih was "mapping out the number of highly educated women in Papua and designing positions for them".

=== Politics and ministry ===
Yembise ran as the regent of Biak Numfor Regency in 2013 as an independent candidate, but was unsuccessful. In an interview, Yembise remarked that many voters liked her but had already committed to candidates who provided funds for construction of houses of worship and others, and added that she was "failed by money".

On 26 October 2014, newly elected president Joko Widodo appointed and swore in Yembise as the Minister of Women's Empowerment and Child Protection, replacing Linda Amalia Sari. Yembise became the first female minister originating from Papua in the Indonesian government.

Yembise dubbed her program "Three Ends" - which included ending domestic violence and human trafficking in addition to ending inequality of economic access to women.

== Personal life ==
Yembise is married to Leo Danuwira. The couple has three children, including two daughters who studied abroad. She is a Christian.
