= I Wayan Koster =

Governor of Bali (2018–2023; since 2025)

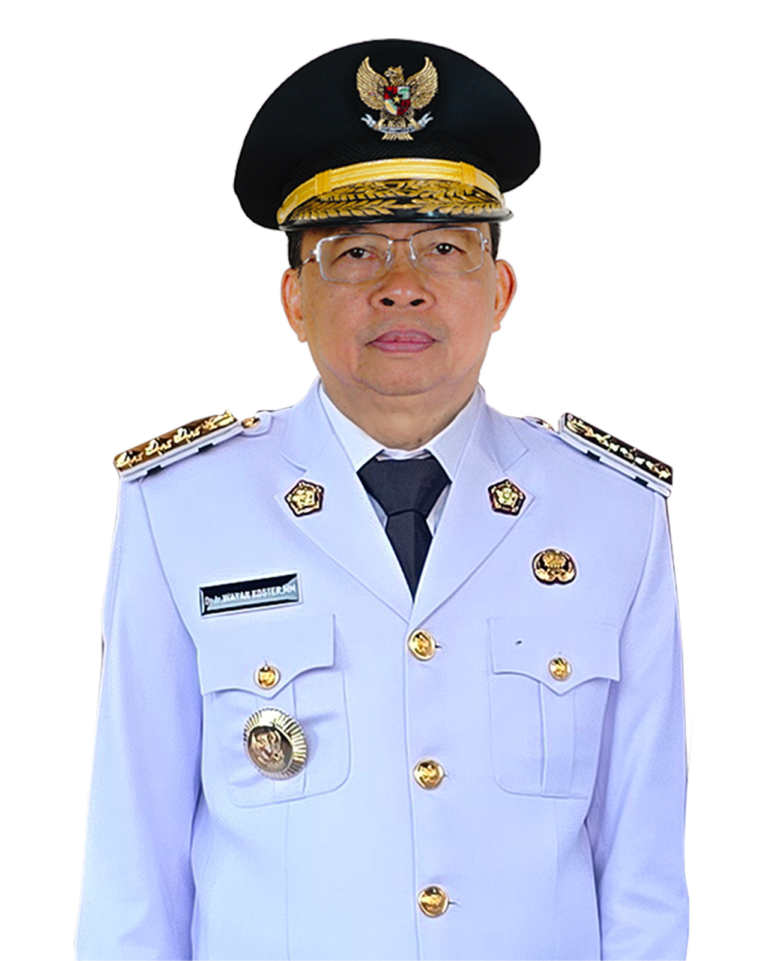
- Official portrait, 2025

8th Governor of Bali
- Incumbent
- Assumed office 20 February 2025
- Vice Governor: I Nyoman Giri Prasta
- Preceded by: Sang Made Mahendra Jaya (acting)
- In office 5 September 2018 – 5 September 2023
- Vice Governor: Tjokorda Oka Artha Ardana Sukawati
- Preceded by: I Made Mangku Pastika; Hamdani (acting)
- Succeeded by: Sang Made Mahendra Jaya (acting)

Member of the House of Representatives
- In office 1 October 2004 – 14 May 2018 (resign)
- Succeeded by: I Gusti Agung Putri Astrid Kartika
- Parliamentary group: Indonesian Democratic Party of Struggle Faction
- Constituency: Bali
- Majority: 37,947 (2004; 1st term); 185,901 (2009; 2nd term); 260,342 (2014; 3rd term)

Personal details
- Born: 20 October 1962 (age 63) Singaraja, Bali, Indonesia
- Citizenship: Indonesia
- Party: PDI-P
- Spouse: Ni Luh Putu Putri Suastini (m. 1999)
- Children: 2 daughters
- Education: Jakarta State University (Doctor)
- Alma mater: Bandung Institute of Technology (BMath); International Golden Institute (MM); Jakarta State University (Dr.)
- Occupation: Politician; engineer; researcher; academician
- Profession: Economist
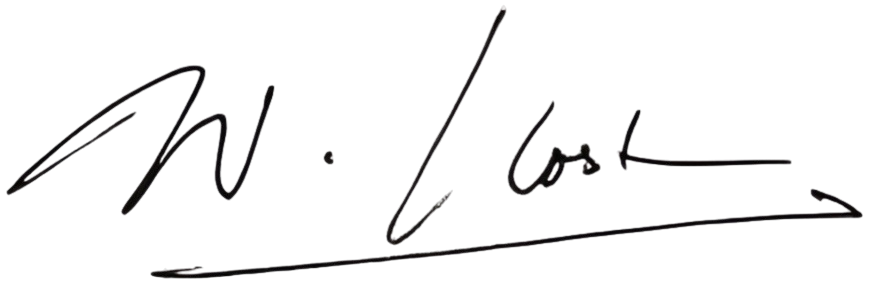
- Signature
- Website: Bali Provincial Govt. website; Party website
- Nicknames: Koster; Nang Ayan Koster; Wayan Koster
- I Wayan Koster's voice Koster makes a speech at the 2021 Bali governor's press conference regarding the new variant of COVID-19 mutation in Bali; Recorded 4 May 2021

I Wayan Koster (born 20 October 1962) is an Indonesian politician and economist who is the 8th governor of Bali, serving in 2018–2023 and since February 2025. He was a member of the House of Representatives (DPR) representing the province of Bali from 2004 to 2018.

A three-term parliamentarian representing his home province, Koster studied at Bandung Institute of Technology and Jakarta State University before becoming a lecturer and eventually joining the Indonesian Democratic Party of Struggle (PDI-P).

== Background ==
Koster was born in the town of Singaraja on 20 October 1962. He completed his first twelve years of education there from 1968, graduating high school in 1980. Afterward, he moved to Bandung to study at the Bandung Institute of Technology, from where he graduated in 1987 with a bachelor's degree in mathematics. Later on, he received a masters from the International Golden Institute (1995) and a doctorate from Jakarta State University (1999).

== Career ==
After earning his bachelor's degree, Koster worked at the Ministry of Education and Culture as a researcher between 1988 and 1995. He then became a non-permanent lecturer at Tarumanagara University, Pelita Harapan University, Jakarta State University and an economic institute.

=== Parliament ===
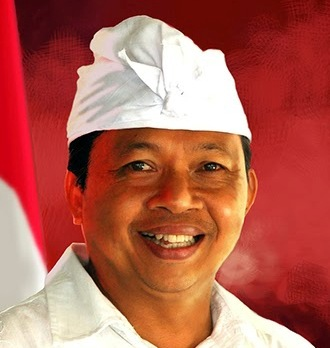
Koster as a member of the House of Representatives in 2014

By 2003, Koster was a specialist staff member in PDI-P. In 2004, he ran for a seat in the People's Representative Council as part of PDI-P. During the campaigning process, he headed a committee for a rally supporting the party in his hometown. Participants of the rally clashed with that of another rally supporting Golkar, resulting in two deaths from the latter group. Koster received a civil suit due to his position. Regardless, Koster secured a seat in the parliament after the 2004 election, and was sworn in on 1 October that year.

After being reelected in 2009 with 185,901 votes, Koster was investigated by the Corruption Eradication Commission several times during his second term. He was questioned in 2011 regarding a case in the education ministry, in 2013 regarding another case related to the National Sports Week, and in 2014 about the cases of Akil Mochtar and the Hambalang sports complex. He was reelected for a third term in 2014, winning 260,342 votes. This was the most votes for Bali candidates and the third-most votes won by a parliamentary candidate nationally, after fellow PDI-P members Karolin Margret Natasa and Puan Maharani.

During most of his time in parliament, Koster was part of the tenth commission covering education, culture, sports, tourism, and the creative economy. He had voiced opposition against a 2014 law that would alter the selection of the parliamentary speaker from appointment by the largest party in an election to that of a parliamentary vote. He also voiced his support for a law which would allow Balinese villages to pick between being a "cultural village" or a standard village. He was eventually retasked to the fifth commission on public works, transportation and rural development.

=== Governor of Bali ===
In 2018, Koster ran in the gubernatorial elections for Bali, resigning from his parliament seat in order to do so. Running with Tjok Oka Artha Ardhana Sukawati, the pair won with 57.68 percent of the votes. He was sworn in on 5 September 2018.

During the campaigning period, Koster stated that he wished to alter the family planning program in Bali by changing the recommended number of children from two to four in order to fit Balinese traditions.

Koster announced a ban on plastic, as stipulated in Gubernatorial Regulation (Pergub) No. 97/2018, expressing hope that the policy would lead to a 70 percent decline in Bali's marine plastics within a year. In 2021, he was one of twelve individuals named in a suit by the International Society for Krishna Consciousness (ISKCON, known locally as the "Hare Krishna") for allegedly hindering worship activities.

== Controversies ==
=== 2023 FIFA U-20 World Cup ===
On 21 March 2023, Koster stated that he rejected the participation of the Israel national under-19 football team in the 2023 FIFA U-20 World Cup, then scheduled to be held in Bali. His decision received a protest from the head of Local House of Representative of the Province of Bali. After FIFA announced that Indonesia was removed as a host of the U-20 World Cup, Indonesian internet users expressed their frustration by flooding Koster's Instagram account comment column.

2023 World Beach Games

On 4 July 2023, Indonesia announced it would no longer host the 2023 Association of National Olympic Committees (ANOC) World Beach Games. About 1,500 athletes from 100 countries were set to compete in Bali from August 5 to 15 in the youth-focused tournament featuring sports including beach soccer, surfing, sailing and beach volleyball. ANOC cited no political reason for Indonesia’s withdrawal in its statement but it follows reported comments from Bali Governor Wayan Koster rejecting Israel’s presence in Bali ahead of the games.

== Electoral history ==
Elections	For	Constituency	Political party	Popular vote	Results
2004	Member of the House of Representatives	Bali	Indonesian Democratic Party of Struggle	37,947	Elected
2009	Member of the House of Representatives	Bali	Indonesian Democratic Party of Struggle	185,901	Elected
2014	Member of the House of Representatives	Bali	Indonesian Democratic Party of Struggle	260,342	Elected
2018	Governor of Bali	Bali	Indonesian Democratic Party of Struggle	1,213,075	Elected
2024	Governor of Bali	Bali	Indonesian Democratic Party of Struggle	1,413,604	Elected

Political offices
Preceded by I Made Mangku Pastika	Governor of Bali; 2018–2023	Succeeded by Sang Ade Mahendra
