= University of National Education =

Private university in Indonesia

- Universitas Pendidikan Nasional ᬉᬦᬶᬯ᬴ᬾᬃᬲᬶᬢᬲ᭄ᬧᭂᬦ᭄ᬤᬶᬤᬶᬓᬦ᭄ᬦᬲᬶᬬᭀᬦᬮ᭄
- Motto: Techno Research-preneur Undiversity
- Type: Private University
- Established: 17 February 1969 (as AKABA)
- Rector: Prof. Ir. Dr. Nyoman Sri Subawa, ST., S.Sos., MM., IPM.
- Location: Denpasar, Bali, Indonesia; 8°40′38″S 115°13′37″E
- Nickname: Undiknas
- Website: www.undiknas.ac.id

University of National Education (Indonesian: Universitas Pendidikan Nasional; Balinese: ᬉᬦᬶᬯ᬴ᬾᬃᬲᬶᬢᬲ᭄ᬧᭂᬦ᭄ᬤᬶᬤᬶᬓᬦ᭄ᬦᬲᬶᬬᭀᬦᬮ᭄ abbreviated as Undiknas), is a private university in Denpasar, Bali, Indonesia. This university was established by I Gusti Ngurah Gorda and Ketut Sambereg. It was previously known as Akademi Keuangan dan Perbankan (AKABA) and was established on 17 February 1969 by Yayasan Pendidikan Kejuruan Nasional (YPKN).

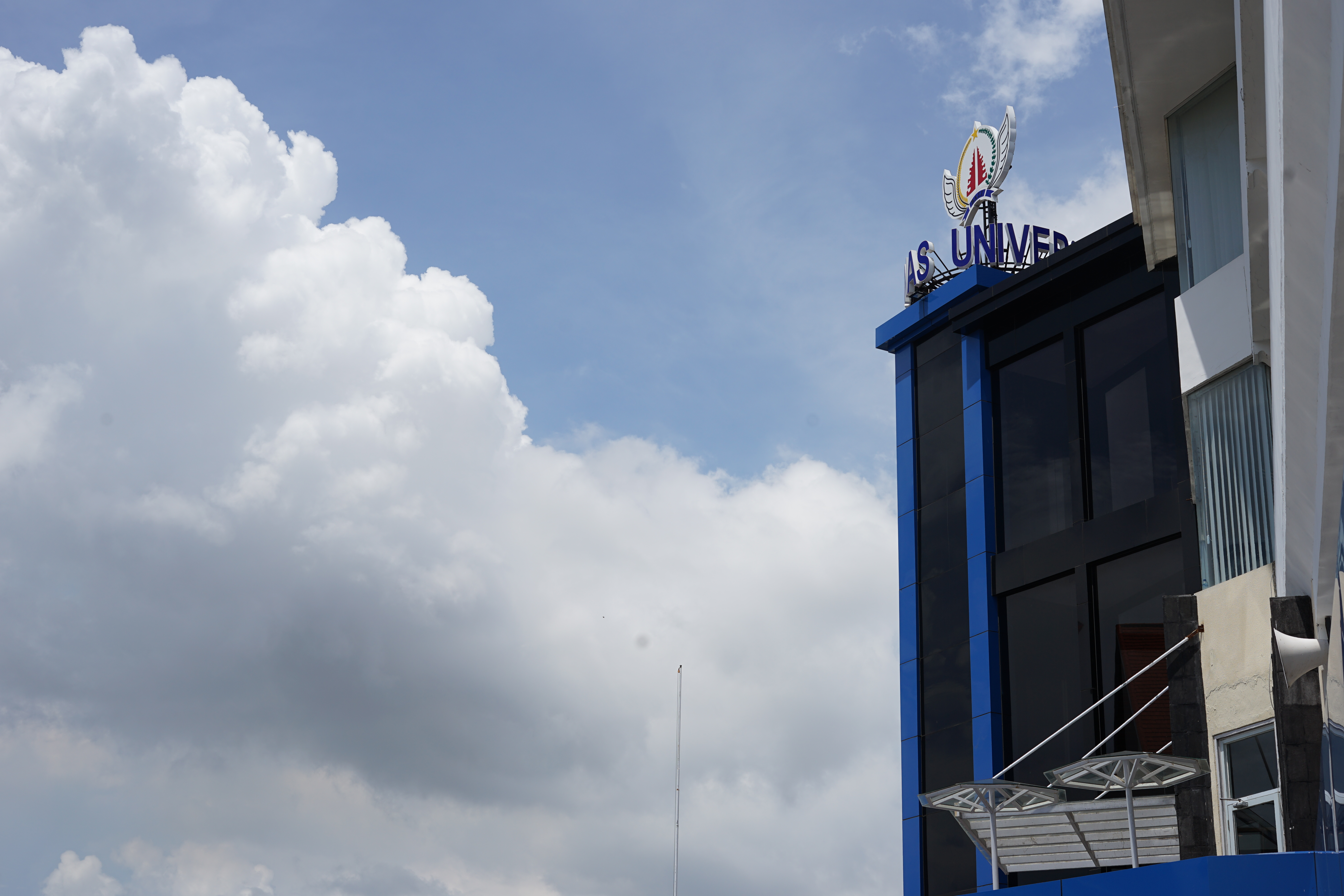
University building

Currently, Undiknas has 15 study programs, with the composition of

9 Study programs at the undergraduate level (S1)

3 Study programs at the master's level (S2)

1 Professional Program

1 Applied Bachelor's Program (D4)

1 Doctoral Program (S3)

Nine Study Programs at the undergraduate level, Professional Program, and Applied Bachelor's are managed through Four faculties, namely:

- Faculty of Economics and Business
- Faculty of Law
- Faculty of Social Sciences and Humanities
- Faculty of Engineering and Informatics

Meanwhile,

Study programs at the Master's level, Engineering Program and Doctoral are managed through the Undiknas postgraduate program called Undiknas Graduate School.

== Faculty ==
=== Faculty of Economics and Business ===
Excellent in producing graduates with integrity, professionalism, entrepreneurial spirit, and global competitiveness (“Empowering globally competitive professional-preneur with integrity”).

=== Faculty of Law ===
In the Law Study Program, Faculty of Law, National Education University, it is the only study program on campus that provides a direct Advocate Education and Training Program (PENLAT), the contents of which are Legal Consultation, Business Law, Courts and Lawyers in Bali.

The practicum provided in the Law Laboratory is a mock trial practicum, the contents of which are the application of all the results of PENLAT, including Criminal Courts, Civil Courts, State Administrative Courts, and Constitutional Court Court Procedures.

=== Faculty of Social Sciences and Humanities ===
Has 2 Study Programs including

==== Communication Science Study Program ====
The Communication Science Study Program is a study program whose graduates mostly become National Artists, with quality talents and knowledge obtained since studying at Undiknas University.

Carrying the tagline Techno Research-preneur University, the Communication Science study program also offers programs that are global and digital-based.

In collaboration with the Ministry of Foreign Affairs, this study program has succeeded in directly inviting several Consulates General and Ambassadors of European Countries who are members of VISEGRAD Europe who provide knowledge about communication science. Where this activity will continue to be carried out in collaboration with other countries.

There are 2 concentrations in the Communication Science study program, Public Relations and Journalism. Unlike other campuses, Undiknas University provides an opportunity for all students of the Communication Science study program to directly dive into private radio and television to increase students' insight.

==== Public Administration Study Program ====
The Public Administration Study Program offers global programs, one of which is building bilateral cooperation between Indonesia and the United States and students of this study program have successfully participated in the "INDONESIA USA 70TH YOUTH AMBASSADOR" activity in June 2019.

In addition, the Public Administration Study Program also collaborates with the Indonesian Association for Public Administration (IAPA) whose members are Academics and Practitioners in the field of Public Administration who actively conduct studies and research to create better governance based on up-to-date issues making this study program much more promising.

The graduates of this program are recognized in the field. One of the example is placement at the Timor Leste Embassy.

=== Faculty of Engineering and Informatics ===
has 3 study programs including

=== Civil Engineering Study Program ===
Is one of the study programs that has an important role in the development of a country, especially in infrastructure and economic development. This study program studies the process of designing, building, and renovating, not only buildings, but also road infrastructure, bridges, dams and other infrastructure.

There are 5 concentrations offered by the Civil Engineering study program, including Structure, Geotechnics, Transportation, Hydrology and Construction Management.

Graduates of this study program can immediately take a professional Engineer degree at Undiknas University too, so you can get 2 degrees.

=== Electrical Engineering Study Program ===
Undiknas University's Electrical Engineering Study Program is the only study program at a PTS (Private University) in Bali

With the competition of RevOlusi 4.0, the Electrical Engineering Study Program, provides a lot of debriefing to all electrical engineering students, who have collaborated with informatics engineering.

Students from the Electrical Engineering Study Program, have won the Line Follower robot making competition by winning 1st place in the national level.

=== Information Technology Study Program ===
Undiknas has just given birth to a new study program for the last 2 years and was named the Information Technology Study Program

As we all know, when discussing this study program, our minds will immediately focus on just a system or application. But not with a new study program owned by Undiknas University.

In just 2 years, young and reliable lecturers in collaboration with information technology students will already launch a "platform" named Udawa (Universal Digital Agriculture Watering) system which is an embedded device that can help regulate agriculture activities of farmers.

== Masters Program ==
Currently, Undiknas Postgraduate School has begun to step on the ASEAN level, this is proven by the registration of Undiknas Postgraduate School as a member of ABEST21, an international accreditation institution headquartered in Japan. Several studies conducted by Undiknas Postgraduate School lecturers have also been published in reputable international publications. Regularly, students, lecturers, and employees are accustomed to being given enrichment programs abroad (Thailand, Malaysia, Singapore) to find out about developments occurring at the ASEAN level. In order to clarify the achievement of the vision of becoming an excellent Undiknas Postgraduate School, milestones have been determined which are then described as follows:

| 1. | In 2018 – 2023, Undiknas Postgraduate School will strengthen ASEAN competitiveness by strengthening the quality of Tridharma of Higher Education by adopting governance standards according to the ASEAN-scale international accreditation body (ABEST21), synergizing with partner universities or foreign institutions at the ASEAN level in the field of Tridharma of Higher Education, Recruiting lecturers who have doctoral qualifications from reputable foreign universities. |
| 2. | In 2023 – 2028, after being able to compete at the ASEAN level, the competitiveness of Undiknas Postgraduate School will be further enhanced at the ASIA level. This is realized in improving the quality of study program governance and implementation of Tridharma of Higher Education through submitting AACSB accreditation (international accreditation body), strengthening the quality of Tridharma of Higher Education through synergy with partner universities in Asian countries without closing the opportunity for synergy with universities in other regions (for example universities in Australia, the United States, and Europe). Intense mobility of students and lecturers at the Asian level through programs such as: joint research, joint publication, student exchange and enrichment programs. |
| 3. | In 2028 - 2033, competitiveness at this milestone is further expanded at the Asia-Pacific level, manifested in continuing the stages in submitting accreditation to AACSB and adopting governance according to AACSB standards. Strengthening the quality of the Tridharma of Higher Education through synergy with partner universities in Asia-Pacific countries. Increasing the ranking of the Undiknas Postgraduate School in the list of business school rankings by reputable international rankings, so that it can be in the top 600 positions in the Asia-Pacific region. |
| 4. | In 2033 - 2038, the Undiknas Postgraduate School is superior, namely entering the ranks of the best Postgraduate Programs in Asia-Pacific. |

== Engineer Program ==
This study program, specifically for those of you who have obtained a bachelor's degree (S1), the Engineer Study Program is one of the seven professional fields stipulated in the decision Minister of Education and Culture 2015 concerning Sndikti.

Environment is a technical activity using expertise and expertise based on the mastery of science and technology to increase added value and effectiveness by paying attention to safety, health, benefit, and community welfare and environmental sustainability.
