= Cok Ace =

Deputy Governor of Bali

Tjokorda Oka Artha Ardana Sukawati
- ᬢ᭄ᬚᭀᬓᭀᬃᬤᬑᬓᬅᬃᬝᬅᬃᬤᬦᬲᬸᬓᬯᬢᬶ
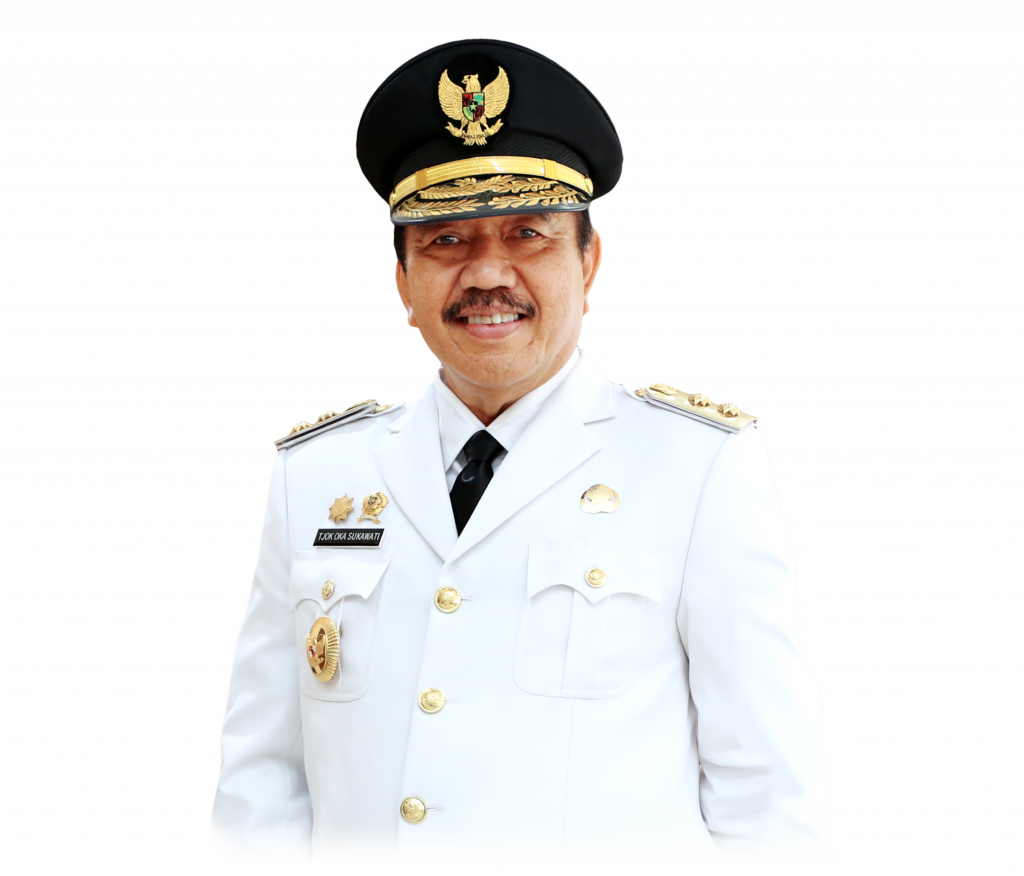
- Official portrait, 2023

9th Vice Governor of Bali
- In office 5 September 2018 – 5 September 2023
- Governor: I Wayan Koster
- Preceded by: I Ketut Sudikerta
- Succeeded by: I Nyoman Giri Prasta

10th Regent of Gianyar
- In office 2008–2013
- Vice Regent: Dewa Made Sutanaya
- Preceded by: A.A.G. Agung Bharata
- Succeeded by: A.A.G. Agung Bharata

Personal details
- Born: January 23, 1957 (age 69) Ubud, Gianyar, Bali
- Party: PDI-P
- Spouse: Tjokorda Istri Putri Hariyani Ramaswati
- Children: 4
- Relatives: Tjokorda Gde Raka Soekawati (uncle); Tjokorda Ngurah Wim Sukawati (cousin)
- Education: Universitas Udayana
- Occupation: Politician; scientist
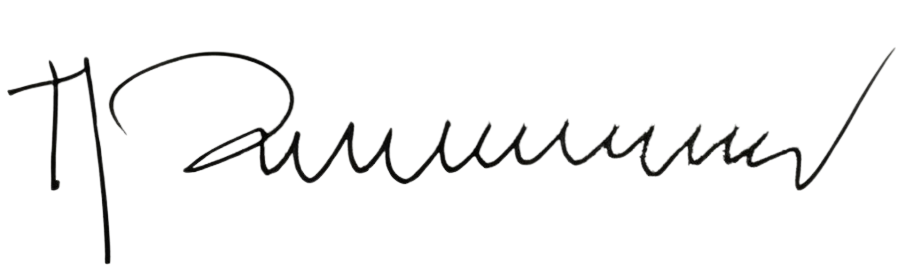
- Signature
- Nickname: Cok Ace

Tjokorda Oka Artha Ardana Sukawati (Balinese: ᬢ᭄ᬚᭀᬓᭀᬃᬤᬑᬓᬅᬃᬝᬅᬃᬤᬦᬲᬸᬓᬯᬢᬶ; born 23 January 1957), known as Cok Ace is an Indonesian politician, scientist and nobleman who is the 9th Vice Governor of Bali from 2018 to 2023, He was previously the 10th regent of Gianyar from 2008 to 2013.

His royal house is Sukawati.

== Background ==
In 1910, Tjokorda Gde Agung Sukawati was born as the youngest son of the King of Ubud, Tjokorda Gde Agung Sukawati (also called Tjokorda Gede Putra Sukawati), who became the heir to the Ubud Kingdom and the father of Cok Ace. Tjokorda Gde Agung Sukawati had wives including, Anak Agung Rai Mengwi, his first wife, where from this marriage he did not have children, so he married for the second time with A.A. Niyang Agung and had a daughter, namely Tjokorda Istri Atun Sukawati alias Cok Atun. Cok Atun married to Puri Singapadu, Singapadu, Sukawati, Gianyar.

It was only in his third marriage in 1940, with Anak Agung Rai Bumbungan, also called A.A. Niyang Rai Bungbungan, from Puri Bungbungan, Bungbungan, Banjarangkan, Klungkung, that Tjokorda Gde Agung Sukawati was blessed with three sons, namely Cok Ace, Tjokorda Gde Putra Sukawati alias Cok Putra who is now the panglingsir of Puri Agung Ubud and Tjokorda Gde Raka Sukawati alias Cok De.

A.A. Niyang Rai Bungbungan, Cok Ace's mother, died in 2011.

On October 10, 2018, Tjokorda Gde Bayuputra Sukawati or also known as Cok Tra who is the second son of Cok Ace married Cokorda Istri Ari Sintya Dewi from Puri Kemuda Sari Ubud.

== Personal interests ==
=== Artist ===
One of Cok Ace's abilities in the arts is by becoming Calon Arang or a dancer who performs the Sidakarya mask play.
