= Mayor of Denpasar =

Political position held by the regional leader of Denpasar City

- Wali Kota Denpasar
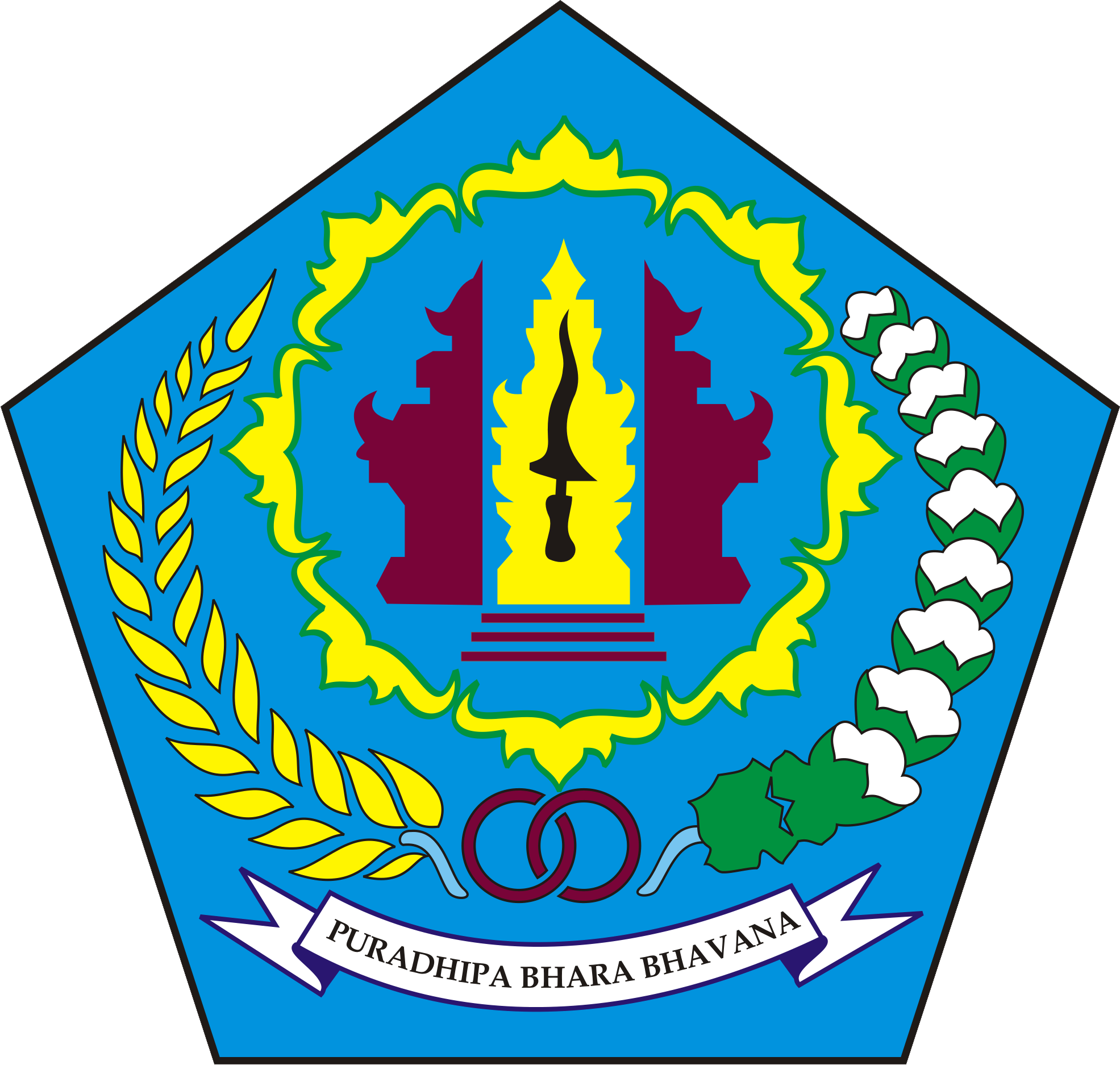
- Coat of arms of Denpasar

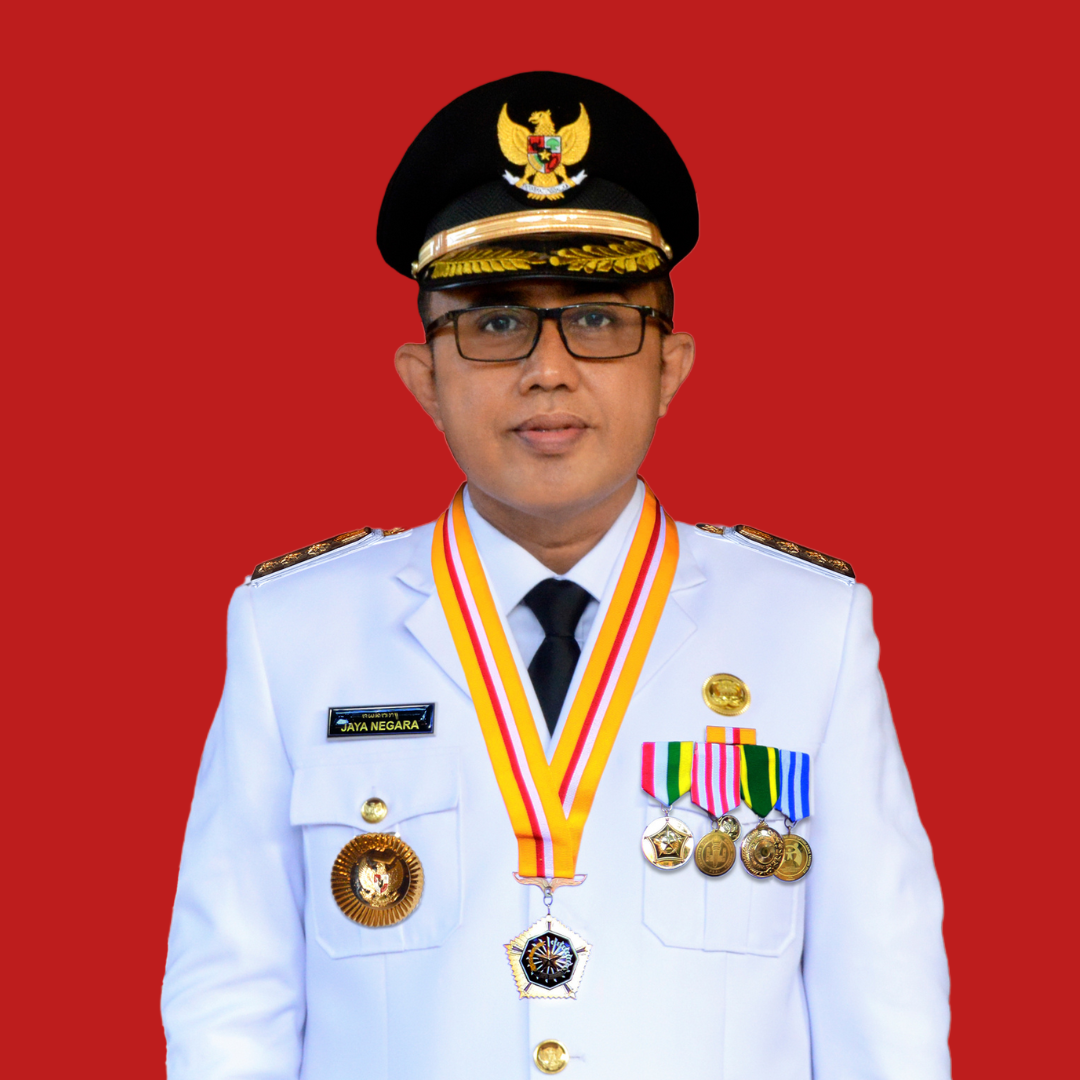
- Incumbent; I Gusti Ngurah Jaya Negara since 20 February 2025
- Term length: 5 years
- Inaugural holder: I Gusti Ngurah Wardana
- Formation: 1978
- Website: denpasarkota.go.id

Mayor of Denpasar is the head of the second-level region who holds the government in Denpasar together with the Vice Mayor and 45 members of the Denpasar City Regional House of Representatives. The mayor and vice mayor of Denpasar are elected through general elections held every 5 years. The first mayor of Denpasar was I Gusti Ngurah Wardana, who governed the city period from 1978 to 1983.

Before becoming an autonomous city, Denpasar was an administrative city and was part of Badung Regency.

== List ==
The following is a list of the names of the Mayors of Denpasar from time to time.

Administrative Mayor of Denpasar
Num.	Portrait	Mayor	Beginning of office	End of Term	Political Party / Faction	Period	Note.	Vice mayor
1		I Gusti Ngurah Wardana	1978	1983	Golkar (Note: The Joint Secretariat of Golongan Karya was not a political party during the period 1964 to 1998. Golkar is a group of Golkar groups that oversees several Parent Organization Groups (KINO), including the Republic of Indonesia Civil Servant Corps (KORPRI) which includes civil servants. This official was formerly a bureaucrat in the Ministry of Home Affairs of the Republic of Indonesia who was "employed" as an administrative mayor as well as a member of Golkar.)	1		—
2		I Gusti Putu Rai Andayana	1983	1987	Golkar	2		—
3		Anak Agung Ngurah Gde Agung	1987	1991	Golkar	3		—
Mayor of Denpasar
Num.	Portrait	Mayor	Beginning of office	End of Term	Political Party / Faction	Period	Note.	Vice mayor
1		I Made Suwendha	1992	1997	Independent	1		—
2		Komang Arsana	1997	1999	Independent	2		—
3		Anak Agung Gede Ngurah Puspayoga	2000	2005	PDI-P	3		I Ketut Robin (2000–2003)
3		Anak Agung Gede Ngurah Puspayoga	11 August 2005	24 October 2008	PDI-P	4		Ida Bagus Rai Dharmawijaya Mantra
4		Ida Bagus Rai Dharmawijaya Mantra	24 October 2008	11 August 2010	PDI-P	4		—
4		Ida Bagus Rai Dharmawijaya Mantra	11 August 2010	11 August 2015	PDI-P	5		I Gusti Ngurah Jaya Negara
—		Anak Agung Gede Geriya (Action Mayor)	11 August 2015	17 February 2016	Independent	—		—
(4)		Ida Bagus Rai Dharmawijaya Mantra	17 February 2016	17 February 2021	PDI-P	6		I Gusti Ngurah Jaya Negara
—		I Made Toya (Daily Executive)	17 February 2021	26 February 2021	Independent	—		—
5		I Gusti Ngurah Jaya Negara	26 February 2021	24 September 2024	PDI-P	7		I Kadek Agus Arya Wibawa
—		Dewa Gede Mahendra Putra (Acting Mayor)	24 September 2024	23 November 2024	Independent	7	—	
(5)		I Gusti Ngurah Jaya Negara	23 November 2024	20 February 2025	PDI-P	7		I Kadek Agus Arya Wibawa
(5)		I Gusti Ngurah Jaya Negara	20 February 2025	Incumbent	PDI-P	8		I Kadek Agus Arya Wibawa

== See also ==
- Denpasar
- List of incumbent regional heads and deputy regional heads in Bali
