= Ida Bagus Rai Mantra =

Indonesian politician (born 1967)

- ᬇᬤᬩᬕᬸᬲ᭄ᬭᬿᬫᬦ᭄ᬢ᭄ᬭ

Indonesia Senator from Bali
- Incumbent
- Assumed office 1 October 2024
- President: Joko Widodo; Prabowo Subianto
- Constituency: Bali
- Majority: 494.496 (2024)

4th Mayor of Denpasar
- In office 17 February 2016 – 17 February 2021
- Governor: I Made Mangku Pastika; I Wayan Koster
- Deputy: I.G.N. Jaya Negara
- Preceded by: A.A.G. Ngurah Puspayoga
- Succeeded by: I.G.N. Jaya Negara
- In office 24 October 2008 – 28 August 2015
- Governor: I Made Mangku Pastika
- Deputy: I.G.N. Jaya Negara
- Preceded by: A.A.G. Ngurah Puspayoga
- Succeeded by: A.A. Gede Geriya (Acting)

2nd Vice Mayor of Denpasar
- In office 11 August 2005 – 24 October 2008
- Governor: I Made Mangku Pastika
- Preceded by: I Ketut Robin
- Succeeded by: I.G.N. Jaya Negara

Personal details
- Born: Ida Bagus Rai Dharmawijaya Mantra; 30 April 1967 (age 59) Denpasar, Bali, Indonesia
- Party: Independent
- Other political affiliations: PDI-P (2008–2017)
- Parent: Ida Bagus Mantra
- Education: Udayana University; Hindu University of Indonesia
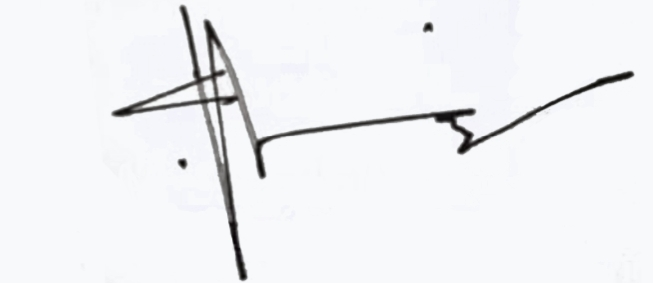
- Signature

Ida Bagus Rai Dharmawijaya Mantra (Balinese: ᬇᬤᬩᬕᬸᬲ᭄ᬭᬿᬟᬃᬫᬯᬶᬚᬬᬫᬦ᭄ᬢ᭄ᬭ; born 30 April 1967) is an Indonesian politician and former mayor of Denpasar from 2016 to 2021. Since October 2024, he is a senator for Bali in the Regional Representative Council (DPD).

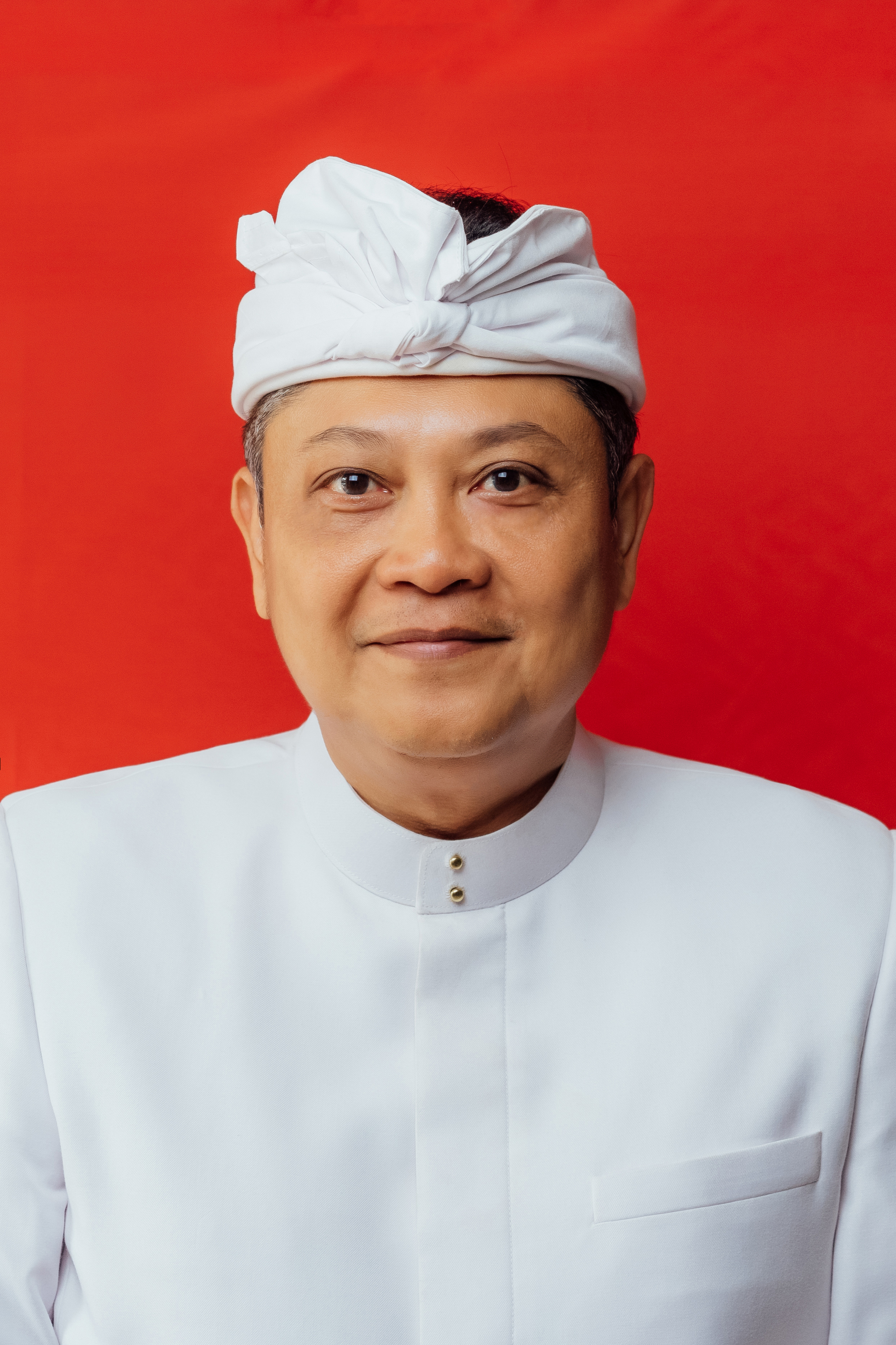
Electoral portrait, 2023

He ran for governor in the 2018 Bali gubernatorial election, but lost.

== Electoral history ==
Elections	For	Constituency	Political party	Popular vote	Results
2008	Mayor of Denpasar	Denpasar	Indonesian Democratic Party of Struggle	Unknown	Elected
2011	Mayor of Denpasar	Denpasar	Indonesian Democratic Party of Struggle	Unknown	Elected
2015	Mayor of Denpasar	Denpasar	Indonesian Democratic Party of Struggle	191,347	Elected
2018	Governor of Bali	Bali	Independent	889,930	Not elected
2024	Senator	Bali	Independent	494,698	Elected
