= Denpasar City Regional House of Representatives =

Denpasar City Regional House of Representatives Dewan Perwakilan Rakyat Daerah Kota Denpasar
- 2024–2029 Period
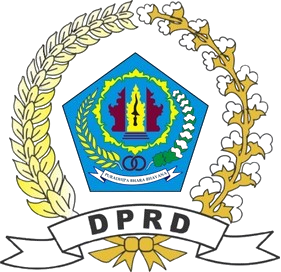

Type
- Type: Unicameral
- Term limits: 5 years

History
- New session started: 19 August 2024

Leadership
- Speaker: I Gusti Ngurah Gede, S.H., PDI-P since 7 October 2024
- 1st Vice Speaker: Ida Bagus Yoga Adi Putra, S.H., M.Kn., Gerindra since 7 October 2024
- 2nd Vice Speaker: I Wayan Mariyana Wandhira, S.T., Golkar since 7 October 2024
- 3rd Vice Speaker: Dr. Made Oka Cahyadi Wiguna, S.H., M.Kn., PSI since 7 October 2024

Structure
- Seats: 45
- Political groups: Government (32) PDI-P (22) Golkar (7) Demokrat (2) Gelora (1) Opposition (13) Gerindra (9) PSI (3) NasDem (1)

Elections
- Voting system: Open list
- Last election: 14 February 2024

Meeting place
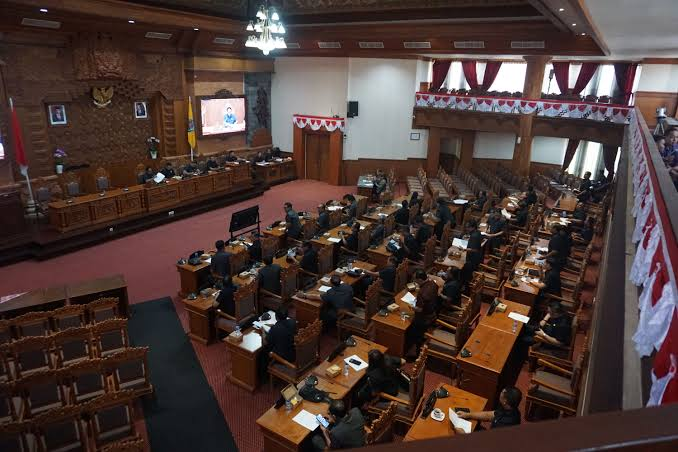
- Denpasar City Regional House of Representatives Building; Melati Street Number 17; Dangin Puri Kangin, North Denpasar, Denpasar; Bali, Indonesia

Website
- www.dprd.denpasarkota.go.id

The Denpasar City Regional House of Representatives (Indonesian: Dewan Perwakilan Rakyat Daerah Kota Denpasar, DPRD Kota Denpasar) is the unicameral municipal legislature of Denpasar, Bali, Indonesia. It has 45 members, who are elected every five years, simultaneously with the national legislative election.

== Legal basis ==
The legislature for Denpasar was formed along with those of other cities in Bali under Law Number 1 of 1992, which organized city governments within the province.

== General election results ==
=== 2024 Indonesian legislative election ===
The official valid votes received by political parties contesting the 2024 Indonesian legislative election in each electoral district (constituency) for members of the Denpasar City Regional House of Representatives are as follows.

2024 Indonesian legislative election results

Electoral district	PKB	Gerindra	PDI-P	Golkar	NasDem	Labour	Gelora	PKS	PKN	Hanura	Garuda	PAN	PBB	Democratic	PSI	Perindo	PPP	Ummat	Valid votes
Denpasar City 1	1,248	9,336	18,372	4,320	766	181	1,049	2,372	269	34	59	296	67	2,640	3,118	510	132	124	44,893
Denpasar City 2	1,079	12,741	23,556	4,811	954	207	946	3,168	71	32	60	204	19	6,214	3,578	438	41	575	58,694
Denpasar City 3	2,294	11,444	46,614	16,925	3,680	326	3,775	1,081	118	83	107	228	40	1,726	5,563	679	46	36	94,765
Denpasar City 4	609	9,867	32,251	11,269	4,351	337	888	773	249	30	52	47	67	5,162	2,761	383	46	25	69,167
Denpasar City 5	1,462	20,726	46,904	12,736	1,816	455	2,698	2,988	157	123	75	737	111	1,752	6,279	1,522	36	168	100,745
Total	6,692	64,114	167,697	50,061	11,567	1,506	9,356	10,382	864	302	353	1,512	304	17,494	21,299	3,532	301	928	368,264
Source: General Elections Commission of Indonesia

== Composition ==
The following is the composition of members of the Denpasar City Regional House of Representatives in the last three periods.

Party	Total seats		
Party	2014–2019	2019–2024	2024–2029
Gerindra seats	5	▼4	▲9
PDI-P seats	18	▲22	22
Golkar seats	8	8	▼7
NasDem seats	1	▲3	▼1
Gelora seats			1
PKS seats	3	▼0	0
Hanura seats	4	▼2	▼0
Demokrat seats	6	▼4	▼2
PSI seats		2	▲3
Total Seats	45	45	45
Total Party	7	7	7

== Electoral district ==
In the 2019 Legislative Election and the 2024 Legislative Election, the Denpasar City Regional House of Representatives election was divided into 5 electoral districts as follows:

Electoral District Name	Electoral District Area	Number of Seats
DENPASAR CITY 1	West Denpasar A (Dauh Puri, Dauh Puri Kangin, Dauh Puri Kauh, Dauh Puri Klod, Pemecutan Klod, Tegal Harum)	6
DENPASAR CITY 2	West Denpasar B (Padangsambian Kaja, Padang Sambian, Padangsambian Klod, Pemecutan, Tegal Kerta)	7
DENPASAR CITY 3	North Denpasar	12
DENPASAR CITY 4	East Denpasar	8
DENPASAR CITY 5	South Denpasar	12
TOTAL		45

== See also ==
- Bali Regional House of Representatives
- Denpasar
- Bali
