= Dutch intervention in Bali =

Dutch intervention in Bali may refer to:

- Dutch intervention in Northern Bali (1846)
- Dutch intervention in Northern Bali (1848)
- Dutch intervention in Bali (1849)
- Dutch intervention in Bali (1858)
- Dutch intervention in Bali (1906)
- Dutch intervention in Bali (1908)

== See also ==
- Dutch intervention in Lombok and Karangasem, 1894
