= Sumatra's West Coast Residency =

Administrative subdivision of the Dutch West Indies

Sumatra's West Coast Residency Sumatra's Westkust Residentie
- Residency of Dutch East Indies
- 1819–1942
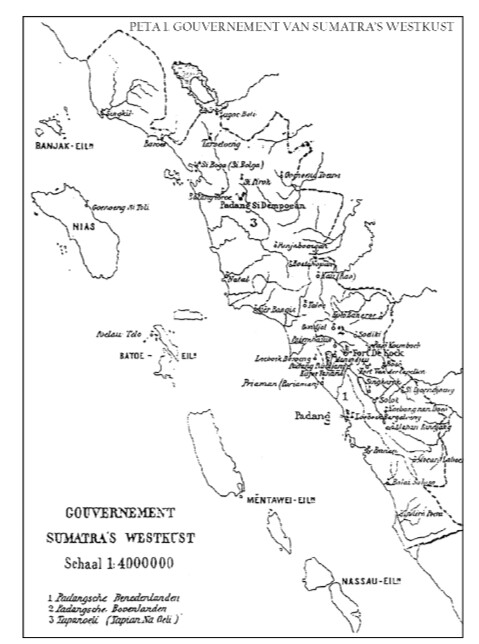
- Map of Sumatra's Westkust Residentie
- Capital: Padang
- History
  - Establishment: 1819
  - Invasion of Sumatra: 14 February – 28 March 1942
Preceded by	Succeeded by
Pagaruyung Kingdom	Japanese occupation of West Sumatra
- Today part of: West Sumatra

West Coast Sumatra (Dutch: Sumatra's Westkust Residentie, abbreviated SWK) refers to the administrative region in the Dutch East Indies that covered the west coast of Sumatra, including the Mentawai, Nias, Banyak and Batu Islands.

== Background ==
The area originally had the status of a keresidenan in 1819, rose to gouvernement from 1837, and became a keresidenan again from 1914 until it was occupied by the Japanese in 1942. The administrative centre of the West Coast of Sumatra is located in Padang.

When the region had gouvernement status, the West Coast of Sumatra once housed a number of keresidenan, namely Padangsche Bovenlanden, Padangsche Benedenlanden, Bengkulu, Tapanuli, Singkil, Rokan Hulu, Kampar, Kuantan Singingi, and Kerinci. Today, part of the West Coast of Sumatra is inherited by the Province of West Sumatra, while other parts are incorporated into the Provinces of Aceh (Singkil), North Sumatra (Batu Islands, Nias and Tapanuli), Riau (Rokan Hulu, Kampar and Kuantan Singingi), Jambi (Kerinci) and Bengkulu.

Until 1862, the West Coast of Sumatra was ruled by middle-ranking officers, and between 1862-1915 by civilian governors. Notable leaders in this area were Andreas Victor Michiels (1838-1849), Jan van Swieten (1849-1858) and Elisa Netscher (1870-1878).

== Chronic ==
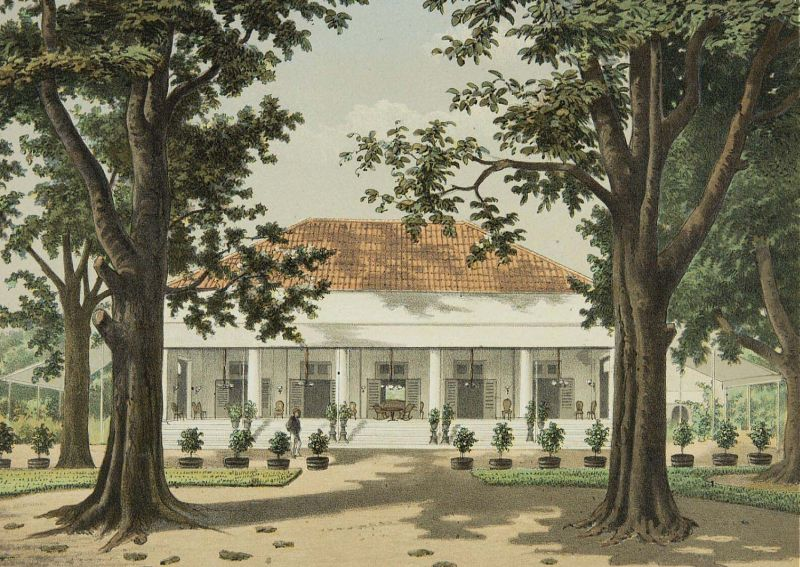
Governor's residence Westkust van Sumatra or ‘west coast of Sumatra’ (lithograph based on a painting by Josias Cornelis Rappard, 1883-1889)

In early October 1842, overseer Eduard Douwes Dekker arrived on the West Coast of Sumatra.

Pastor Marius Buys travelled in this area between 1878-1879. The prints were published as serialised stories in the Opregte Haarlemsche Courant between 1878-1882, and later published as a book.

During the Japanese occupation from 1942 to 1945, the West Coastal region of Sumatra, which had the status of a prefecture, was called Sumatora Nishi Kaigan Shu.

== List of authorities ==
=== Dutch East Indies ===
The ruler who once reigned in Sumatra's Westkust.

Name	Took office	Occupation
James du Puy	May 1819 – November 1823	Assistant Resident
Antoine Theodore Raaff	November 1823 – April 1824	Assistant Resident
Jean Chrétien Baud	April 1824 – December 1824	Assistant Resident
Hubert Joseph Jean Lambert de Stuers	December 1824 – July 1829	Assistant Resident
Hendrik Mauritz Gillavry	July 1829 ‒ March 1831	Assistant Resident
Cornelis Pieter Jacob Elout	March 1831 – February 1834	Assistant Resident
Emanuel Alexander Intveld Francis	February 1834 – November 1837	Assistant Resident
A.V. Michiels	November 1837 – February 1849	Governor
J. Van Swieten	February 1849 – September 1858	Governor
A. Meis	September 1858 – 3 August 1861	Governor
Cornelis Albert de Brauw	3 August 1861 – November 1862	Governor
Jules Félicien Romain Stanislas van den Bossche	6 November 1862 – 28 July 1868	Governor
N.A.T. Arriens	28 July 1868 – 24 February 1870	Governor
Elisa Netscher	24 February – 3 April 1878	Governor
Hendrik Dirk Canne	3 April 1878 – 12 June 1885	Governor
R.C. Kroesen	12 June 1885 – 13 July 1889	Governor
O.M. De Munnick	13 July 1889 – 5 June 1894	Governor
W.J.M. Michielsen	5 June 1894 – 29 September 1898	Governor
A. M. Joekes	29 September 1898 – 22 April 1902	Governor
E. A. T. Weber	22 April 1902 – 12 February 1905	Governor
F. A. Heckler	12 February – 16 February 1910	Governor
J. Ballot	16 February 1910 – 12 August 1915	Governor dan Assistant Resident
J.D.L. Le Febvre	12 August 1915 – 15 September 1919	Assistant Resident
W.A.C. Whitlau	15 September 1919 – 10 June 1926	Assistant Resident
P.C. Arends	10 June 1926 – 29 July 1927	Assistant Resident
George Francois Elbert Gonggrijp	29 July 1927 – 2 January 1932	Assistant Resident
B.H.F Van Heuven	2 January 1932 – 28 February 1935	Assistant Resident
Adriaan Isaac Spits	28 February 1935 – 7 May 1937	Assistant Resident
Gerardus Arnoldus Bosselaar	7 May 1937 – 1942	Assistant Resident

== Bibliography ==
- Buys, Marius. Twee jaren op Sumatra's Westkust, Amsterdam 1886
- Gusti Asnan, Pemerintah Daerah Sumatera Barat dari VOC hingga Reformasi, Yogyakarta: Citra Pustaka, 2006.
