= Jan van Swieten =

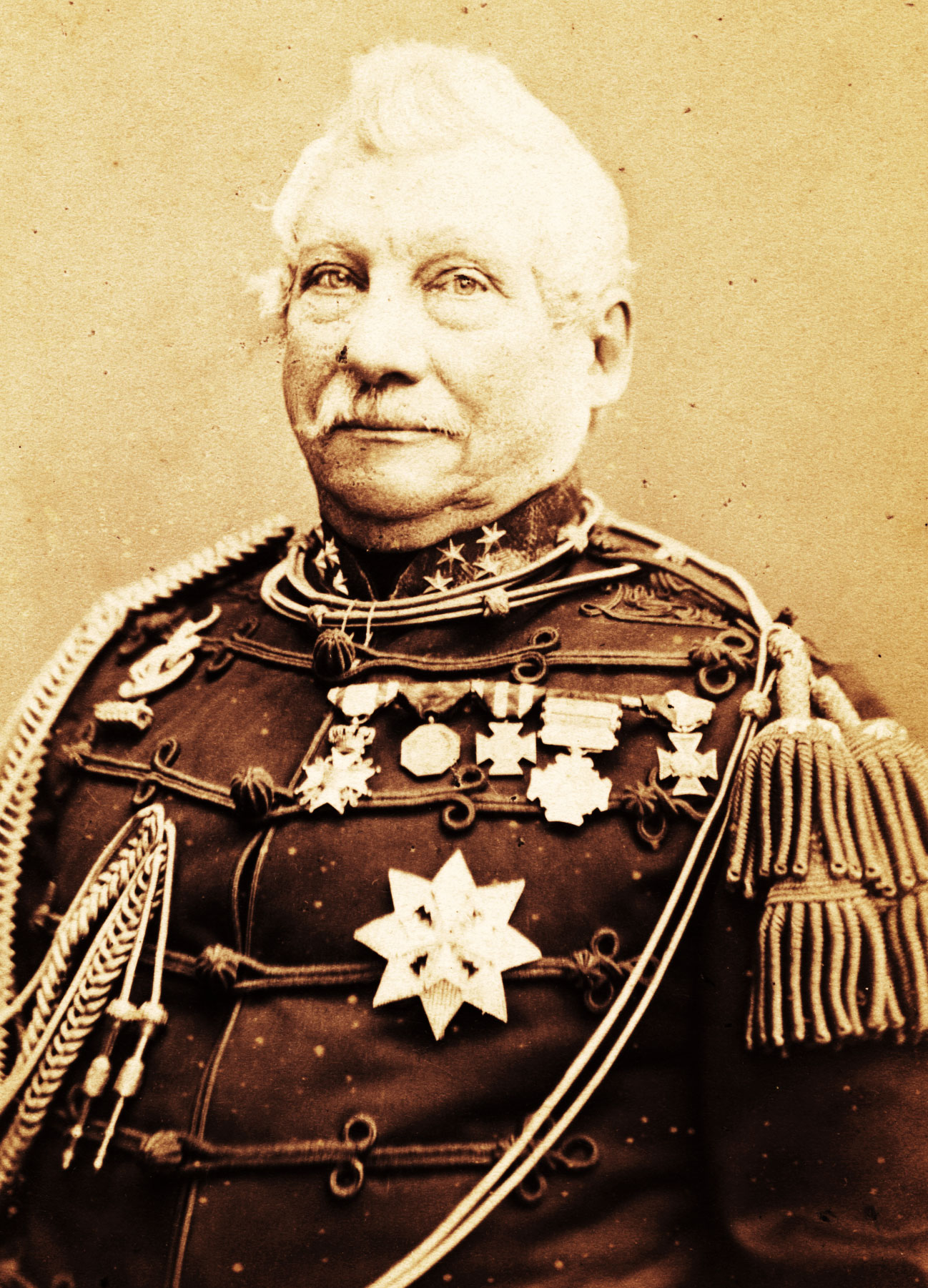
- Lieutenant-General Jan van Swieten in 1874
- Born: Mainz
- Died: The Hague
- Military career
- Allegiance: Netherlands
- Branch: Royal Dutch East Indies Army
- Service years: 1822–1874
- Rank: Lieutenant-General
- Commands: Chief of Staff of the Royal Dutch East Indies Army
- Conflicts: Belgian Revolution, Dutch intervention in Northern Bali (1848); Dutch intervention in Bali (1849); Second Aceh Expedition
- Awards: Military William Order (Knight Grand Cross); Commander of the Order of Orange-Nassau; Knight of the Order of the Dutch Lion; Officer's Cross

Johannes (Jan) van Swieten (Mainz, 28 May 1807 – The Hague, 9 September 1888) was a Dutch General and politician.

== History ==
Van Swieten started his career in 1821 as an volunteer and started as a cadet in 1822, in 1824 became a second Lieutenant. Jan van Swieten played an important role as an officer in the Dutch East Indies and led expeditions in Java. Returned to the Netherlands in 1862, and was politically active for some time. In 1873 he was appointed commander of an expedition to Java and Sumatra after a botched local invasion of Aceh in March. He recaptured The Kraton. In 1874 he received the Grand Cross of the Military Order of William.

He served as commander of the Royal Netherlands East Indies Army from 1858-1862.

== Career ==
- Second Lieutenant in Dutch East Indies Army, from 1827 to 1830 (participated in the Java War)
- First Lieutenant under Prince Frederik, Duke of Saxe-Weimar, 1830
- First Lieutenant in the field, from 1830 to 1834 in the Army
- Captain Dutch East Indies Army, battalion Rifles Guards “Van Cleerens” (in Java), from 1835 to 1842
- Captain Dutch East Indies Army (Sumatra), from 1842 to 1845
- Convoy commander south of Dataran Tinggi Padang Dutch, East Indies Army, from 1845 to 1846
- Officer Dutch East Indies Army in Java, from 1846 to 1848
- Chief of Staff Bali second expedition, from 1848 to 1849
- Battalion commander Bali third expedition, 1849
- Civil and military governor Sumatra's west coast, from 1849 to 1858
- Commander Royal Netherlands East Indies Army, from 1858 to 1862
- Retired, from 1862 to 1873
- Member Council of State in extraordinary service, from February 16, 1864 to September 9, 1888
- Member of the House of Representatives, of September 19, 1864 to October 1, 1866 (for the constituency Amsterdam)
- Government commissioner and commander to the Dutch East Indies, from 1873 to 1874 (Second Aceh Expedition)
- Retired as a soldier, 1874

== Officers ranks ==
- Second lieutenant of infantry, from 1826 to 1829
- First lieutenant of infantry from 1829 to 1835
- Captain of infantry, from 1835 to 1841
- Major of infantry, from 1841 to 1844
- Lieutenant-colonel of infantry, from 1844 to 1849
- Colonel of infantry, from 1849 to 1853
- Major General of Infantry, from 1853 to 1858
- Lieutenant-General of Infantry, from 1858 to September 9, 1888 (from 1862 on non-active)
