= Puputan =

Balinese term for a mass ritual suicide

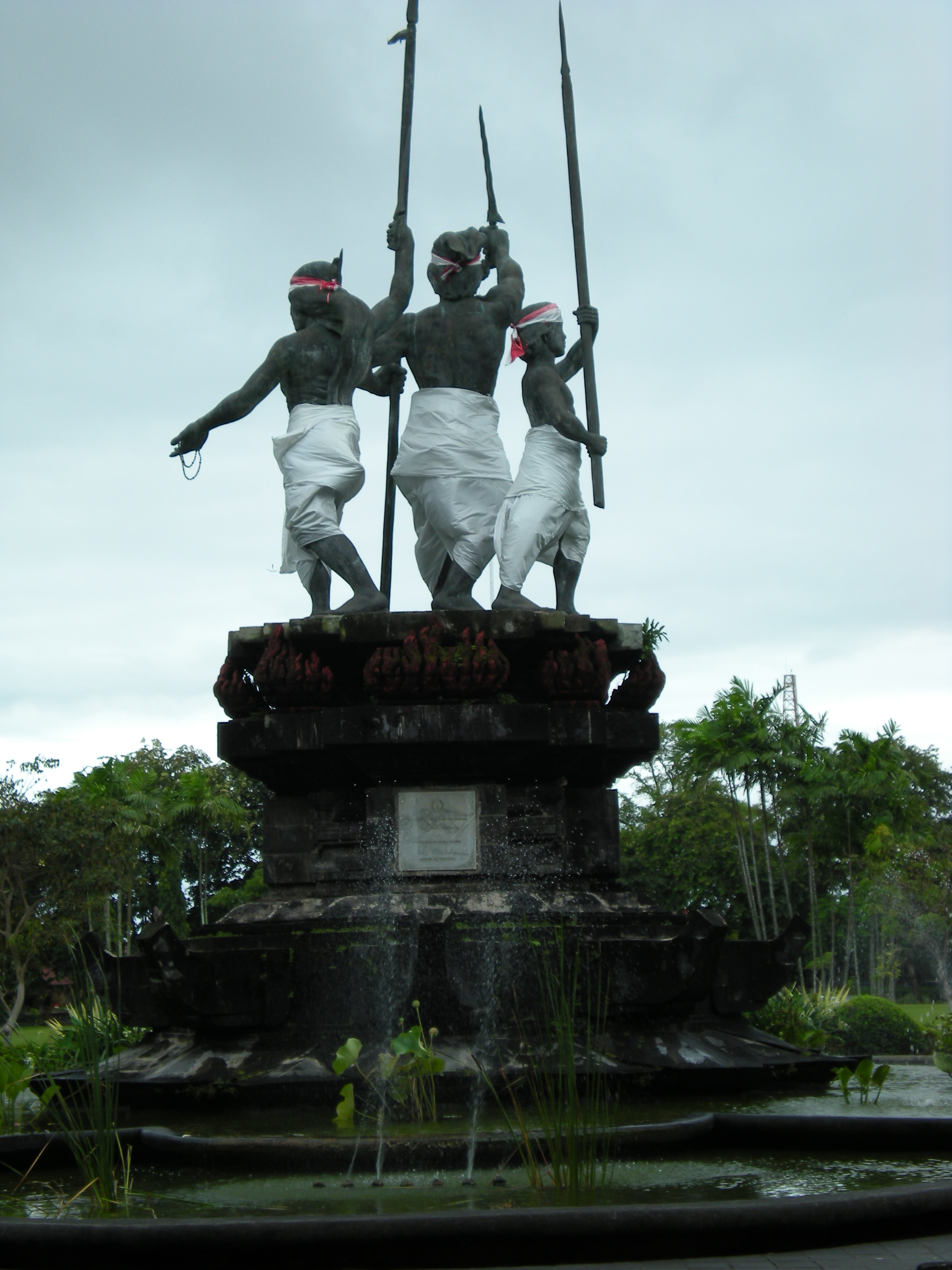
Monument to the 1906 Puputan, located in Taman Puputan (Puputan Park), Denpasar, Bali.

Puputan (Balinese: ᬧᬸᬧᬸᬢᬦ᭄) is a Balinese term for a mass ritual suicide in preference to facing the humiliation of surrender. It originally seems to have meant a last desperate attack against a numerically superior enemy. Notable puputans in the history of Bali occurred in 1906 and 1908, when the Balinese were being subjugated by the Dutch.

== 1771–1773 ==
The fall of the Blambangan Kingdom in the 18th century was followed by numerous rebellions against the Dutch East India Company. These included a fight-to-the-death that became known as Puputan Bayu or Blambangan-Oorlog (Blambangan War), in 1771–1773. The Dutch sent Muslim and Christian missionaries to tame the Osing people's fighting spirit. Only then Banyuwangi was captured; a long and ambitious dream toward further occupation on Bali was launched by the Dutch.

== 1849 ==
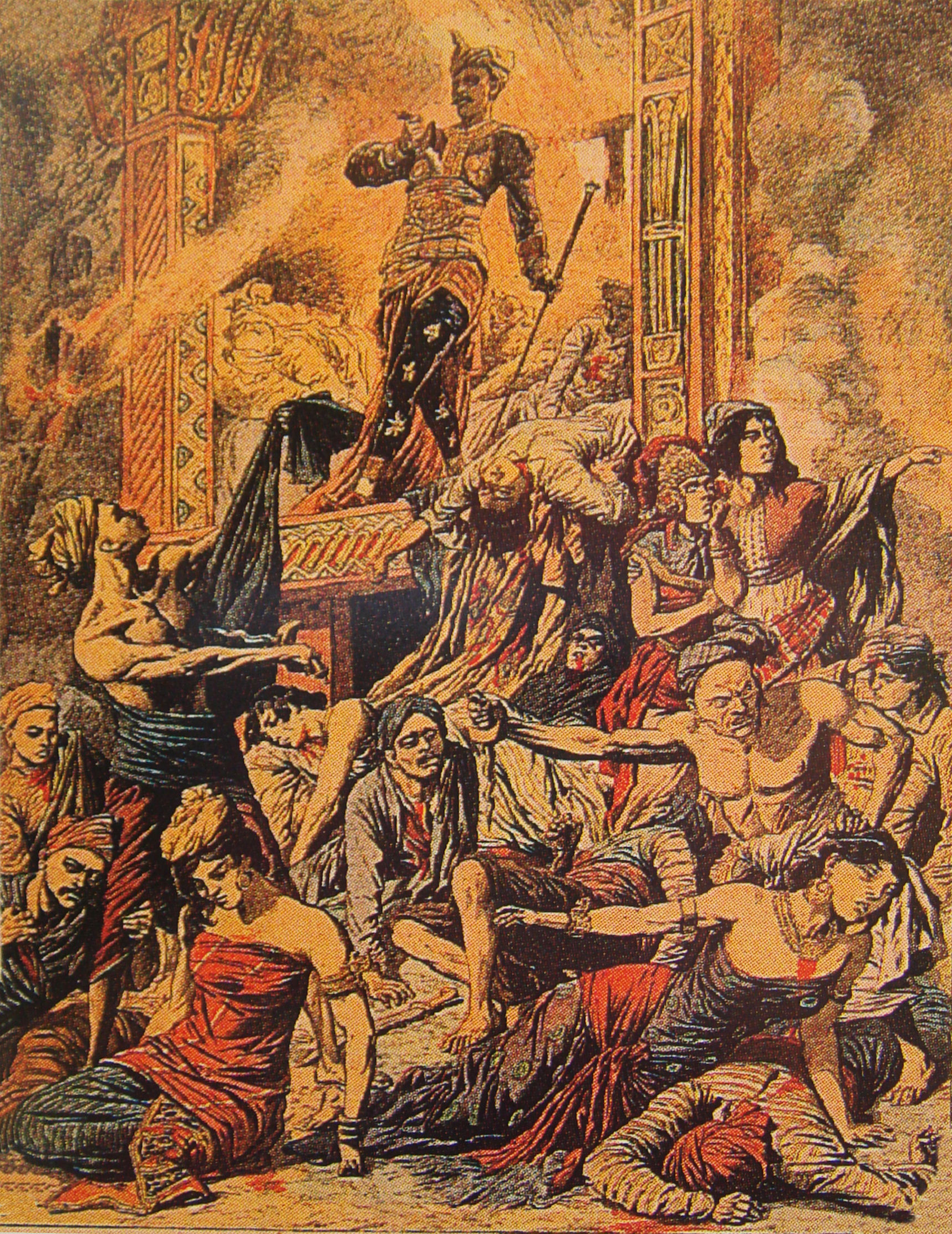
The Raja of Buleleng killing himself with 400 followers, in an 1849 puputan against the Dutch. Le Petit Journal, 1849.

The Dutch intervention in Bali in 1849 was a major military intervention in Northern and Southern Bali, following two failed attempts; the 1846 intervention and the 1848 intervention. The Dutch used as a pretext Balinese salvage claims over shipwrecks, which were customary to the Balinese, but unacceptable under international law.

== 1906 ==
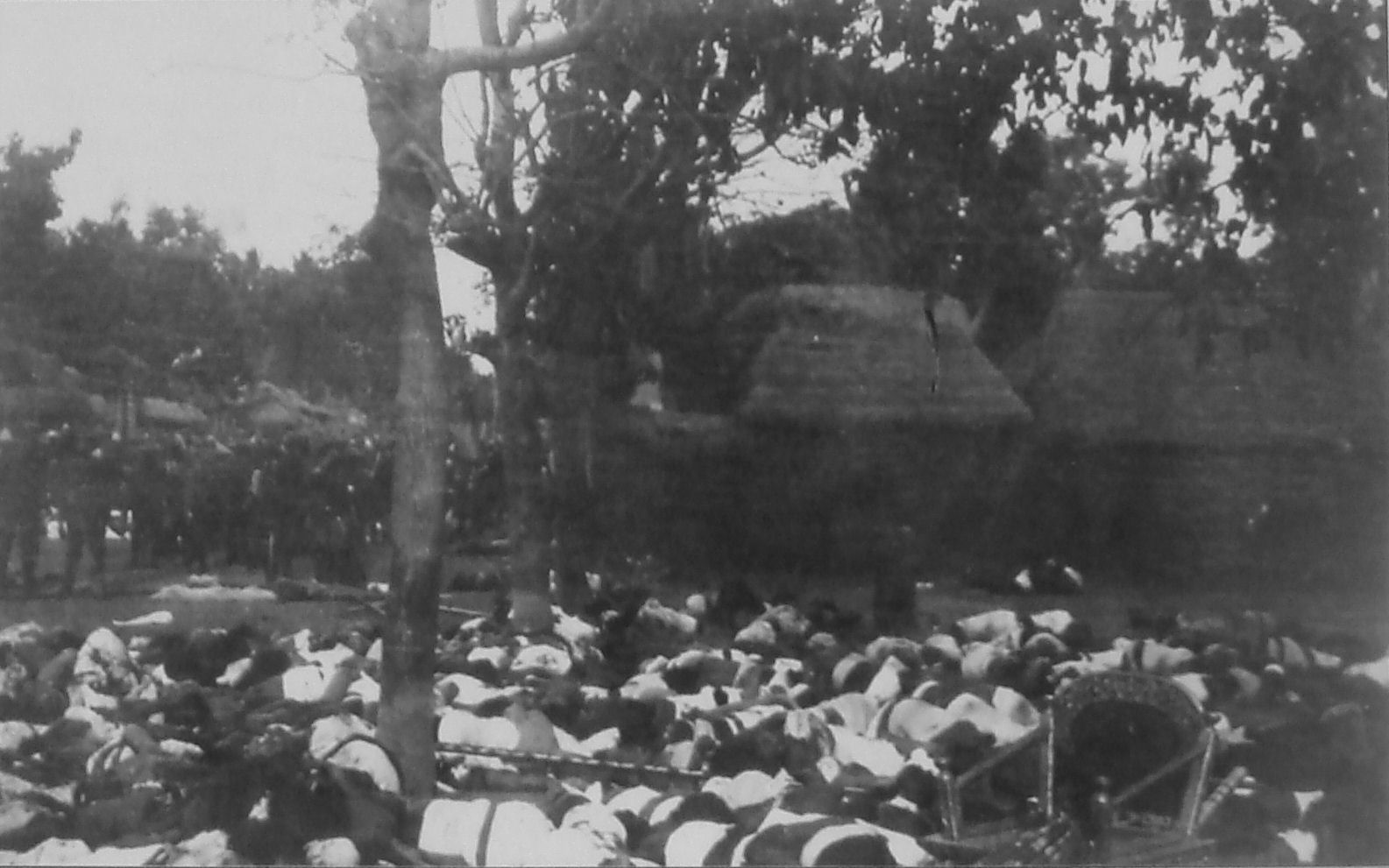
Badung Puputan 1906

On 14 September 1906, a substantial force of the Royal Dutch East Indies Army, named the Sixth Military Expedition, landed at the northern part of Sanur Beach. It was under the command of Major General M.B. Rost van Tonningen. Badung soldiers made some attacks on the bivouacs of the Dutch at Sanur on September 15, and there was some resistance again at Intaran village. (Note: Notice at the Bali Museum)

=== Kesiman ===
Overall, the force managed to move inland without much resistance, and arrived in the city of Kesiman on 20 September 1906. There, the local king, a vassal of the king of Badung, had already been killed by his priest, as he had refused to lead an armed resistance against the Dutch. The palace was in flames and the city was deserted.

=== Denpasar ===
The force marched to Denpasar, Bali, as if in a dress parade. They approached the royal palace, noting smoke rising from the puri and hearing a wild beating of drums coming from within the palace walls.

Upon their reaching the palace, a silent procession emerged, led by the Raja on a palanquin carried by four bearers. The Raja was dressed in traditional white cremation garments, wore magnificent jewelry, and carried a ceremonial kris. The other people in the procession consisted of the Raja's officials, guards, priests, wives, children, and retainers, all of whom were similarly attired. They had received the rites of death, were dressed in white, and had had their ritual kris blessed.

When the procession was a hundred paces from the Dutch force, they halted and the Raja stepped down from the palanquin and signaled a priest, who plunged his dagger into Raja's breast. The rest of the procession began killing themselves and others. Women mockingly threw jewelry and gold coins at the troops.

A 'stray gunshot' and an 'attack by lance and spear' prompted the Dutch to open fire with rifles and artillery. As more people emerged from the palace, the mounds of corpses rose higher and higher. The whole procession numbered hundreds, and is said to have been over 1,000 people in all. It was mown down by Dutch gunfire.

Alternative accounts describe that the Dutch first opened fire on the Balinese mass moving outside of the palace gate, only equipped with traditional krises, spears, and shields, and that survivors killed themselves, or had themselves killed by their followers according to the dictates of the puputan.

The soldiers stripped the corpses of the valuables and sacked the ruins of the burned palace. The palace of Denpasar was razed to the ground.

The same afternoon, similar events occurred in the nearby palace of Pemecutan, where the co-ruler Gusti Gede Ngurah resided. The Dutch let the nobility at Pemecutan kill themselves, and proceeded with the looting.

The massacre is remembered locally as the "Badung Puputan", as a symbol of resistance to foreign aggression. A huge bronze monument was erected on the central square of Denpasar, where the royal palace used to stand, commemorating Balinese resistance in the Puputan.

=== Tabanan ===
The Dutch force continued to the kingdom of Tabanan, where King Gusti Ngurah Agung and his son fled. They surrendered to the Dutch, and attempted to negotiate a settlement to become a regency of the Netherlands.

The Dutch only offered them exile to nearby Madura or Lombok, and they preferred to kill themselves (puputan) in prison two days later. Their palace was plundered and razed by the Dutch.

== 1908 ==
Another puputan occurred on 18 April 1908, at Klungkung Palace. The intervention was triggered by a Balinese revolt against a Dutch attempt to impose an opium monopoly in their favour. The Raja of Karangasem opposed the monopoly, leading to Balinese riots in the capital of Klungkung. Riots also erupted in Gelgel, when the Balinese killed a Javanese opium dealer. The Dutch sent troops to quell the riots. In Gelgel, they killed 100 Balinese, forcing the Raja to flee to Klungkung. The Dutch then bombarded the city of Klungkung.

In a final confrontation on 18 April 1908, Dewa Agung Jambe, the Raja of Klungkung, accompanied by 200 followers, made a desperate sortie out of his Palace, clad in white and armed with a legendary kris supposed to wreak havoc on the enemy according to a prophecy. The kris failed to fulfill the desired outcome, and the Raja was instead shot by a Dutch bullet. Immediately, the six wives of the king resorted to puputan, killing themselves with their kris, soon followed by the other Balinese in the procession.

== 1946 ==
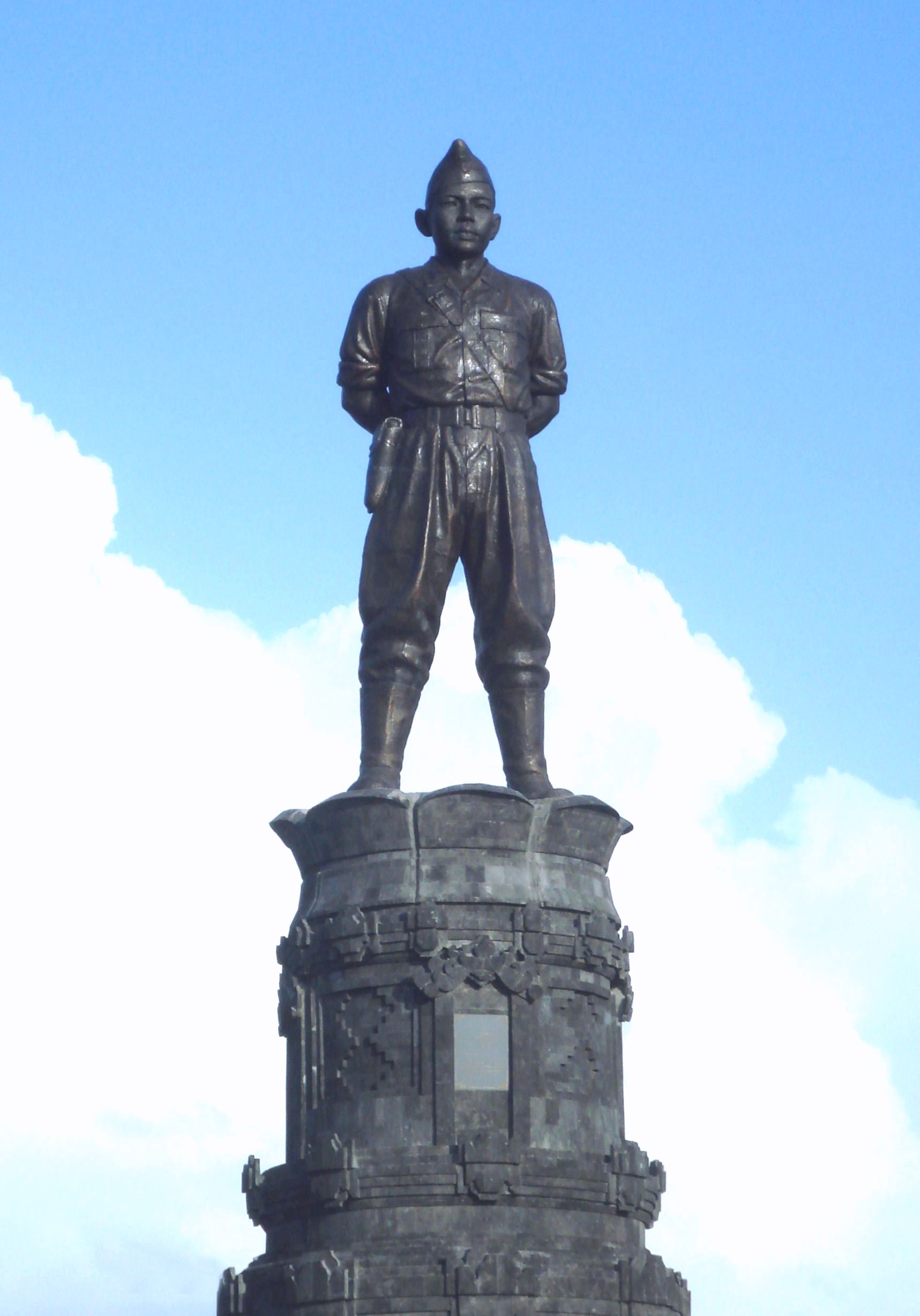
Independence fighter I Gusti Ngurah Rai organized a last puputan against the Dutch Army at the Battle of Margarana in 1946, in which 98 soldiers died with him.

The Battle of Margarana (Balinese: ᬧᬸᬧᬸᬢᬦ᭄ ᬫᬃᬕᬭᬦ, romanized: Puputan Margarana) was a battle fought between the Netherlands Indies Civil Administration (NICA) and the recently created, rebelling Ciung Wanara Battalion that occurred in Marga in Bali, Indonesia.

== See also ==
- Timeline of Indonesian history
- Jauhar, Rajput practice of India
- Seppuku
- Siege of Masada
- Persecution of Hindus
- Mass suicide
