= Michiels Monument, Padang =

Coordinates: 0.955638°S 100.355863°E

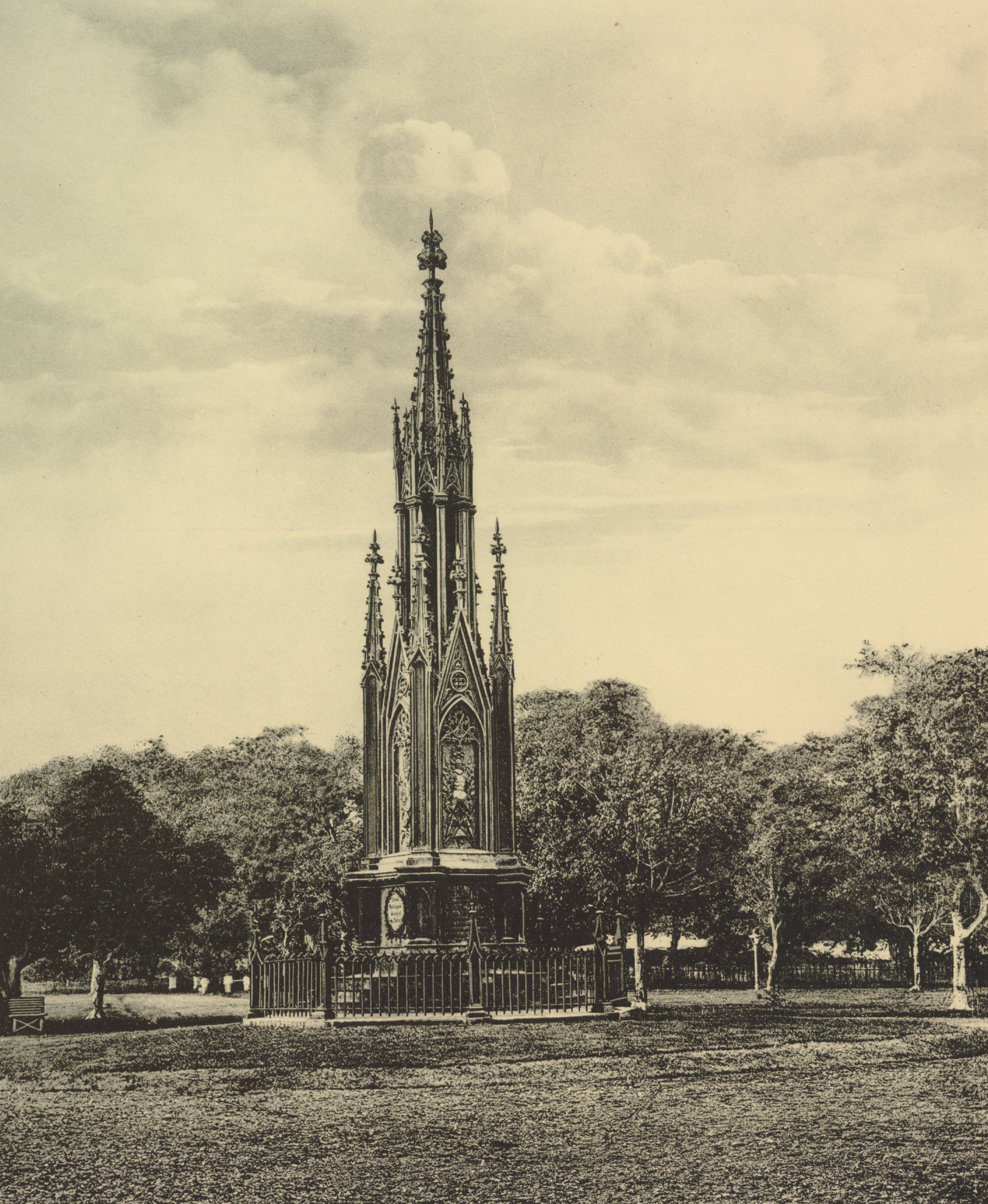
Early 20th-century photograph of the Michiels Monument in Padang.

Michiels Monument (Dutch Michielsmonument) was a monument in Padang, West Sumatra, Indonesia. The monument was erected in 1855 at the Michielsplein, in what is now Taman Melati, close to Adityawarman Museum. The monument was dedicated to Andreas Victor Michiels, subjugator of West Sumatra. The monument was demolished by the Japanese during World War II.

== History ==
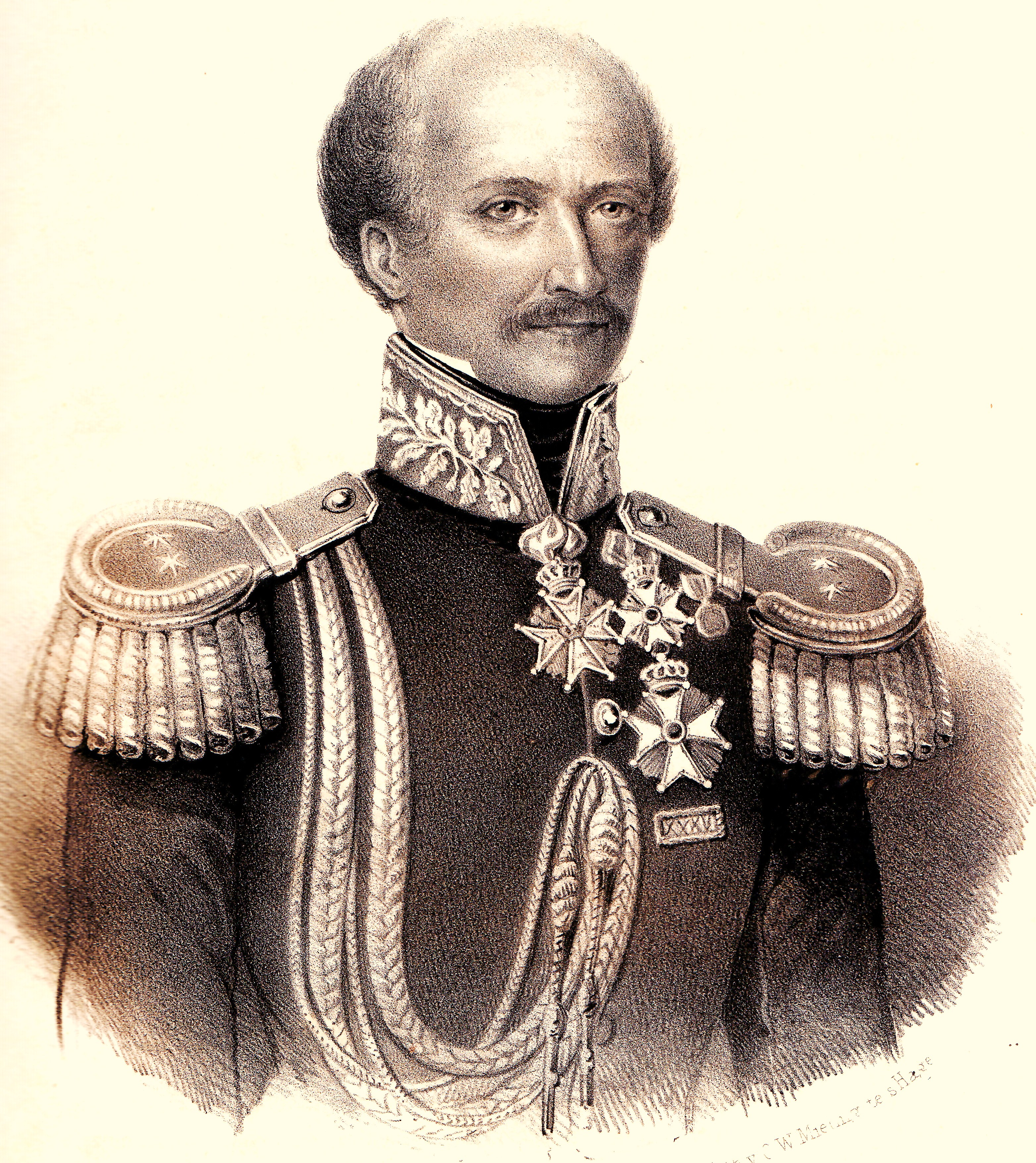
Andreas Victor Michiels.

The Dutch colonial government erected the Michiels monument in 1855 to commemorate General Andreas Victor Michiels. Michiels was a military and administrative officer in the Dutch East Indies who had led many expeditions to subdue revolts in the region, including West Sumatra. An imposing neo-Gothic structure was built to commemorate him and to express Dutch dominance. Similar impressive neo-Gothic iron structures dedicated to Michiels were erected in Batavia and Surabaya in more or less similar form.

During the Japanese occupation of Indonesia, many Dutch colonial monuments in Padang were destroyed, including the Michiels monument. The iron from the Michiels monument was converted into arms. The other iron monuments of Michiels in Batavia and Surabaya were destroyed similarly to be converted into arms.

On 9 March 1950, within three months of the transfer of sovereignty, the Indonesian administration built a freedom monument on the exact site of the Michiels monument dedicated to the unknown soldiers. This monument was located in front of Adityawarman Museum.

== Monument and symbol ==
During the colonial period, the city of Padang had many, often political, monuments. Among these monuments were those that commemorated: Lieutenant A.T. Raaff (the first Dutchman to fight in the hinterland of Padang (1855); Willem Hendrik de Greve (discoverer of the Ombilin coal deposits, unveiled in 1880); the Sarekat Adat Alam Minangkabau (an organization of conservative pro-Dutch Indonesians, unveiled in 1919); the Jong Sumatranen Bond (a moderately nationalist movement, inaugurated in 1920); W.A.C. Whitlau (a local administrator, the clock tower dedicated to him was built in 1922 and was demolished in 1934 because it was considered an obstacle to traffic); and Sutan Masabumi (a Minangkabau royal loyal to the Dutch cause, erected in 1930).

The Michiels monument was a 10-meter high iron tower and was the tallest monument in Padang. The monument was designed as a neogothic tower, standing on a marble base, and topped with a neo-Gothic sculpture made of iron. The Michiels monument was located at Michiels plein (Michiels Square). Michiels plein, although only the second largest square, was the most important in Padang. Many daily activities e.g. playing football were forbidden on the square. The largest square in Padang, the Plein van Rome (now Lapangan Imam Bonjol) was normally used for sports and a market.

== Cited works ==
- Columbijn, Freek (1993). "2. The power of symbols in the urban arena: The case of Padang (West Sumatra)". In Nas, Peter J.M. (ed.). Urban Symbolism. BRILL. ISBN 9789004098558.
- Nas, Peter J.M.; Samuels, Annemarie (2006). Hypercity: The Symbolic Side of Urbanism. London: Routledge. ISBN 9780710312792.
