= I Gusti Ketut Jelantik =

Balinese Prime Minister of Buleleng

- Born: 1800; Tukadmangga, Buleleng, Dutch East Indies
- Died: 1849 (aged 48–49); Jagaraga, Buleleng, Dutch East Indies

I Gusti Ketut Jelantik (1800–1849) was a Balinese Prime Minister of the state of Buleleng, who resisted the imposition of Dutch treaties.

== Military career ==
He became a leader in the resistance against the Dutch invasion of Bali, fighting them in several Dutch military interventions: the Dutch intervention in Northern Bali during 1846, 1848, and 1849.

In 1849, he escaped the Dutch offensive in Buleleng with the ruler of Buleleng, and fled to escape to allied Karangasem, but he was ultimately killed in an ambush by forces of Lombok, allies of the Dutch.

He has been designated as an Indonesian National Hero.
