= Dutch intervention in Bali (1858) =

Dutch intervention in Bali of 10–26 December 1858 was the fourth punitive expedition of the Royal Netherlands East Indies Army (KNIL) on the island. This expedition was directed against certain chiefs (pungawwa) of Buleleng who were fomenting revolt and opposition to the Dutch-appointed regent.

After the Dutch intervention of 1849, the prince of Bangli was given charge of the administration of Buleleng. Unable to win the confidence of either the chiefs or the people, he resigned in 1854 and the Dutch appointed a regent under the supervision of a Dutch controleur (comptroller). In Jembrana the people revolted against the oppressions of the restored prince, and the Dutch replaced him with another regent and two advisors, one Dutch the other approved by the local chiefs.

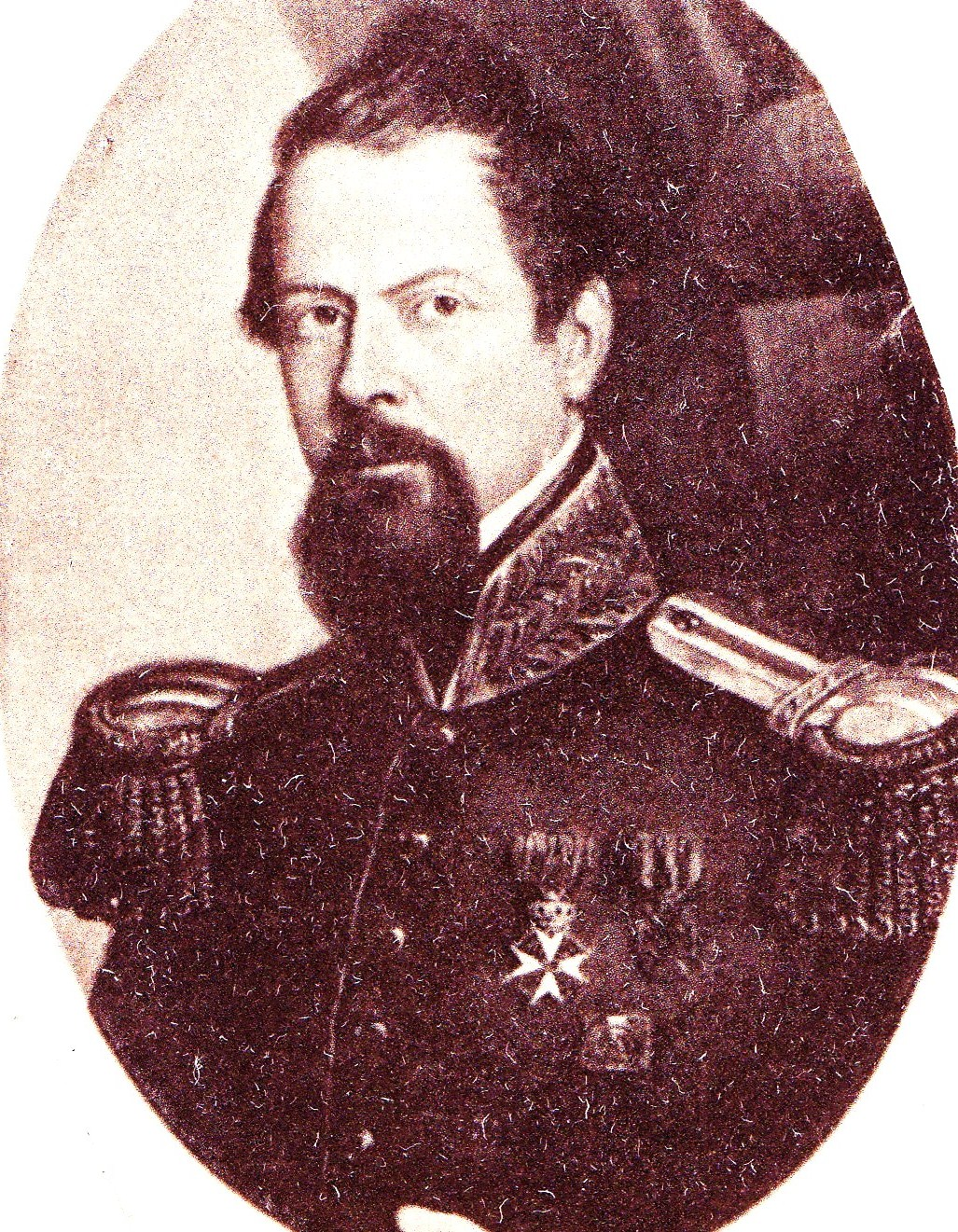
van Steijn van Hensbroek

When the deposed prince of Jembrana, who had gone into exile in Buleleng, invaded his former princedom, the people failed to rise in support. The Dutch had the chiefs of Buleleng banish him from Bali. One pungawwa, Njoman Gempol of Bandjar Djawa, opposed this and tried to foment popular unrest against the Dutch by spreading rumours (true or false) of Dutch misrule on Java. Summoned by the Dutch authorities he refused to appear, and when the chiefs were asked to extradite him they refused. Towards the end of 1858 three warships, three transports and two kruisboten (cutters) under Lieutenant Captain (Kapitein-luitenant ter zee) van Hasselt left Java for Buleleng with a force consisting of the 13th Infantry Battalion and two mortars under Lieutenant Colonel Karel Felix van Steijn van Hensbroek. The total number of troops was 707 infantryman under 12 officers. Political control of the expedition fell to assistant residents Bosch and van Bloemen Waanders.

On 11 December 1858 the Dutch forces landed without resistance and began marching on Bandjar Djawa. They intended to arrest Njoman Gempol, but he fled into the kampungs. The show of force—and sacking of villages—was enough to get the chiefs to comply with the order to extradite Gompal. He was betrayed by some farmers and handed over. By the end of December the troops had returned to Surabaya. Gompal and his fellow chief, Ida Mahe Rai, were exiled to Java.

== Sources ==
- W. A. Terwogt. 1900. Het land van Jan Pieterszoon Coen. Geschiedenis van de Nederlanders in oost-Indië. Hoorn: P. Geerts.
- G. Kepper. 1900. Wapenfeiten van het Nederlands Indische Leger, 1816–1900. The Hague: M. M. Cuvee.
- A. J. A. Gerlach. 1876. Nederlandse heldenfeiten in Oost Indë. 3 vols. The Hague: Gebroeders Belinfante.
