= Andreas Victor Michiels =

Dutch officer (1797–1849)

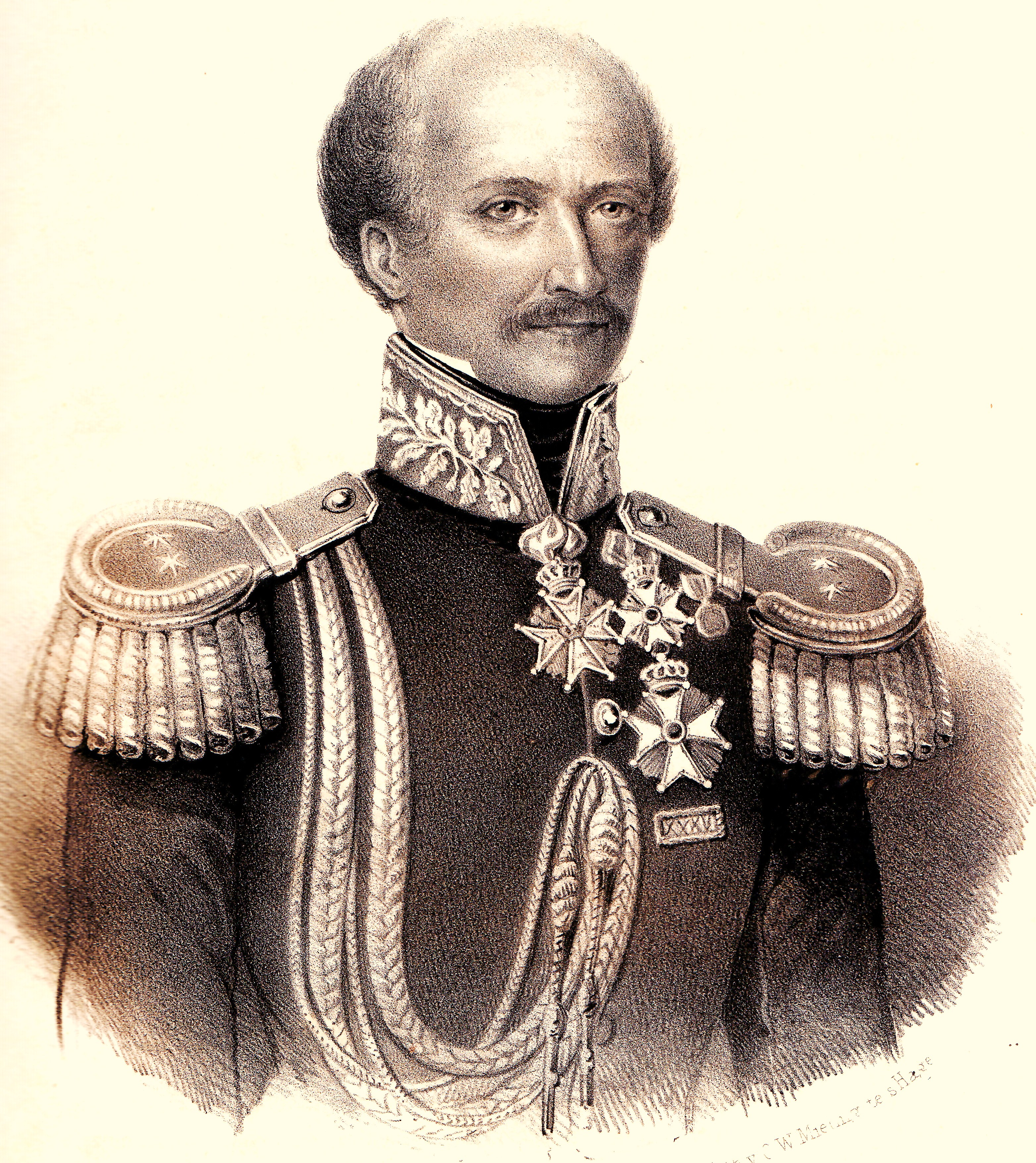
- Anonymous portrait, c. 1802–1820

Governor of West Coast Sumatra
- In office November 1837 – February 1849
- Appointed by: Kingdom of the Netherlands
- Preceded by: Emanuel Alexander Intveld Francis
- Succeeded by: Jan van Swieten

Personal details
- Born: 30 May 1797 Maastricht, French Republic
- Died: 25 May 1849 (aged 51) Kusamba, Bali

Andreas Victor Michiels (30 May 1797 – 25 May 1849) was a Dutch military and administrative officer in the Dutch East Indies. He was Governor of West Coast Sumatra from 1837 until 1849. In 1849 he was appointed commander of the Royal Dutch East Indies Army. He led the Dutch 3rd expedition in Bali, in which he perished in May 1849.

== Early life and military career ==
Michiels entered military service at age 17 years, participated in the Battle of Waterloo, and in 1817 went to the island of Java, where he was directly involved in the conflict in Cirebon. On 29 August 1818 he was promoted to captain. He fought in the Java War as a colonel commandant. On 22 November 1828, King William I appointed Michiels a knight and officer in the Military William Order, one year before he was appointed as a major. In the years 1831 and 1832, he participated in the conquest of Narras and Kottiangan, in 1832, he led an expedition against the Jambi Sultanate; the month of May in that year he was appointed lieutenant-colonel and in November he was awarded a knighthood in the Order of the Netherlands Lion. He led the raid on Bonjol and under his leadership he was able to take it. For his success, he was promoted to colonel on 3 October 1837. Under his leadership, in 1838 he conquered Kuta, and in 1840 overpowered Barus, Tapoes and Singkil, in 1841 he suppressed a rebellion in Batipo and in 1844 and 1845, a general attack was launched. Michiels also received the honor of the Dutch people for the achievement. In 1841, he was appointed as an aide in the special service of kings and commanders of the Military William Order. In 1843, Michiels obtained the rank of major general.

== Governor of West Coast of Sumatra ==
On 20 November 1837, Michiels was appointed governor of the West Coast of Sumatra. He supported the traditional leaders and with their assistance, the Dutch government was established in the Minangkabau highlands. His policy was rather rough and was criticized by Ferdinand Vermeulen Krieger and Wolter Robert van Hoëvell.

As governor of the West Coast of Sumatra, in 1843, Michiels had a serious clash with Eduard Douwes Dekker, who was then serving as controller at Natal (now in Mandailing Natal Regency, North Sumatra) because of a cash budget deficit. Dekker was suspended from office, and moved to Padang without earning anything. Dekker included a character General Van Damme in his novel Max Havelaar based upon Michiels.

== End of life ==
On 19 February 1849 Michiels was appointed temporary commander of the Royal Dutch East Indies Army and leader of government affairs and chairman of Bali for the 3rd expedition against a number of kingdoms in Bali. He was succeeded as governor by Jan van Swieten. After victories in a number of skirmishes, Michiels was killed in a night attack led by Dewa Agung Istri Kanya. His tombstone is now in a cemetery now known as Taman Prasasti Museum, Jakarta, Indonesia.

== See also ==
- Michiels Monument in Padang
