= Dutch intervention in Bali (1849) =

Military expedition in 1849

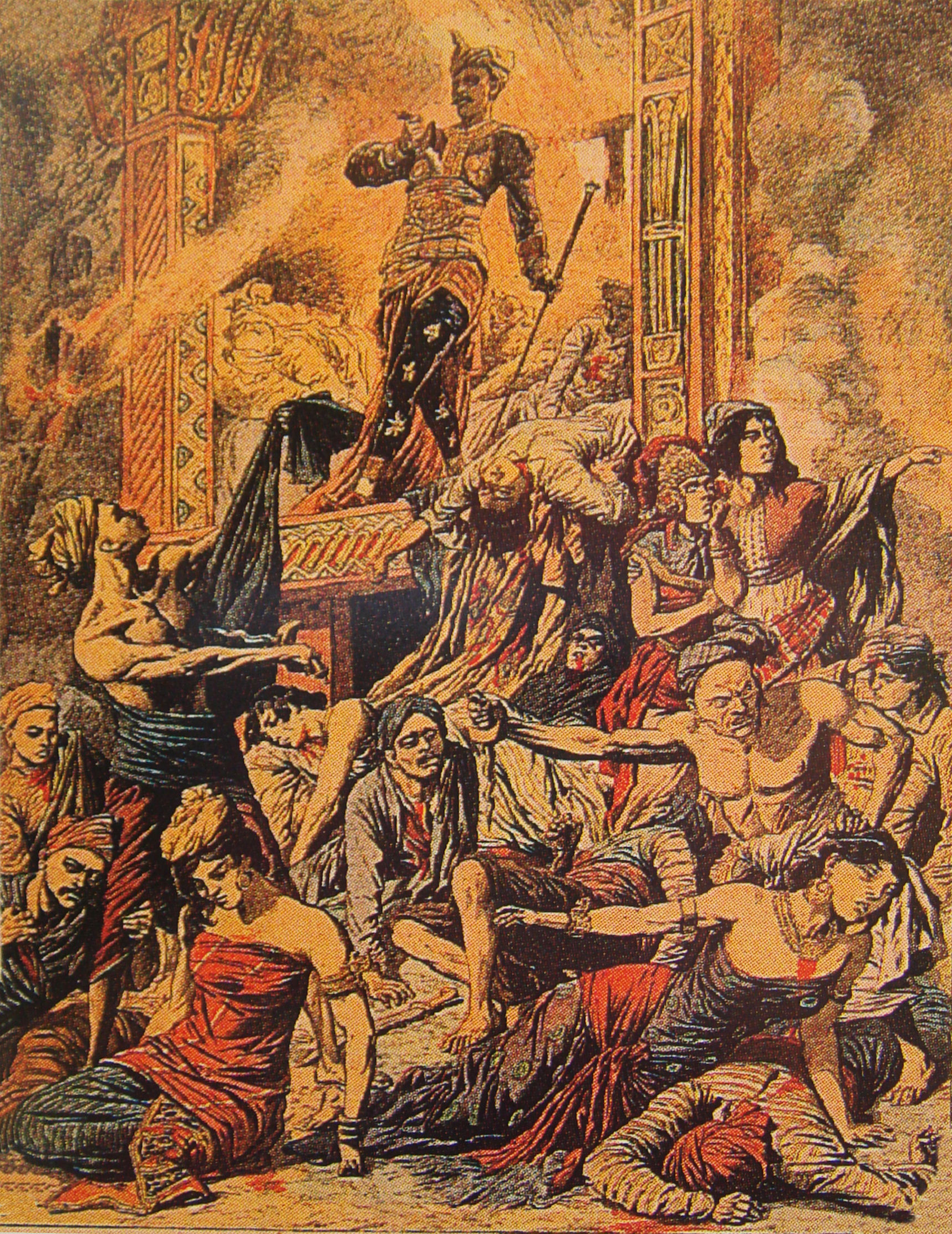
- The Raja of Buleleng killing himself with 400 followers, in an 1849 puputan against the Dutch. Le Petit Journal, 1849.
Date	1849–1850
Location	Bali, (now Indonesia)
Result	Dutch victory on Northern Bali; Stalemate on Southern Bali
Territorial changes	Northern Bali were recaptured by the Dutch

Belligerents
Netherlands; Lombok	Kingdom of Buleleng; Kingdom of Jembrana; Kingdom of Klungkung; Kingdom of Karangasem

Commanders and leaders
Andreas Victor Michiels †	I Gusti Ketut Jelantik †

Strength
100 ships 3,000 sailors 5,000 well-trained soldiers	33,000 men

Casualties and losses
34	1,000s

The Dutch intervention in Bali in 1849 was a major Dutch military intervention in Northern and Southern Bali, following two failed interventions, the 1846 intervention and the 1848 intervention. The Dutch used as a pretext Balinese salvage claims over shipwrecks, which were customary to the Balinese, but unacceptable under International law.

== Dutch naval expedition ==
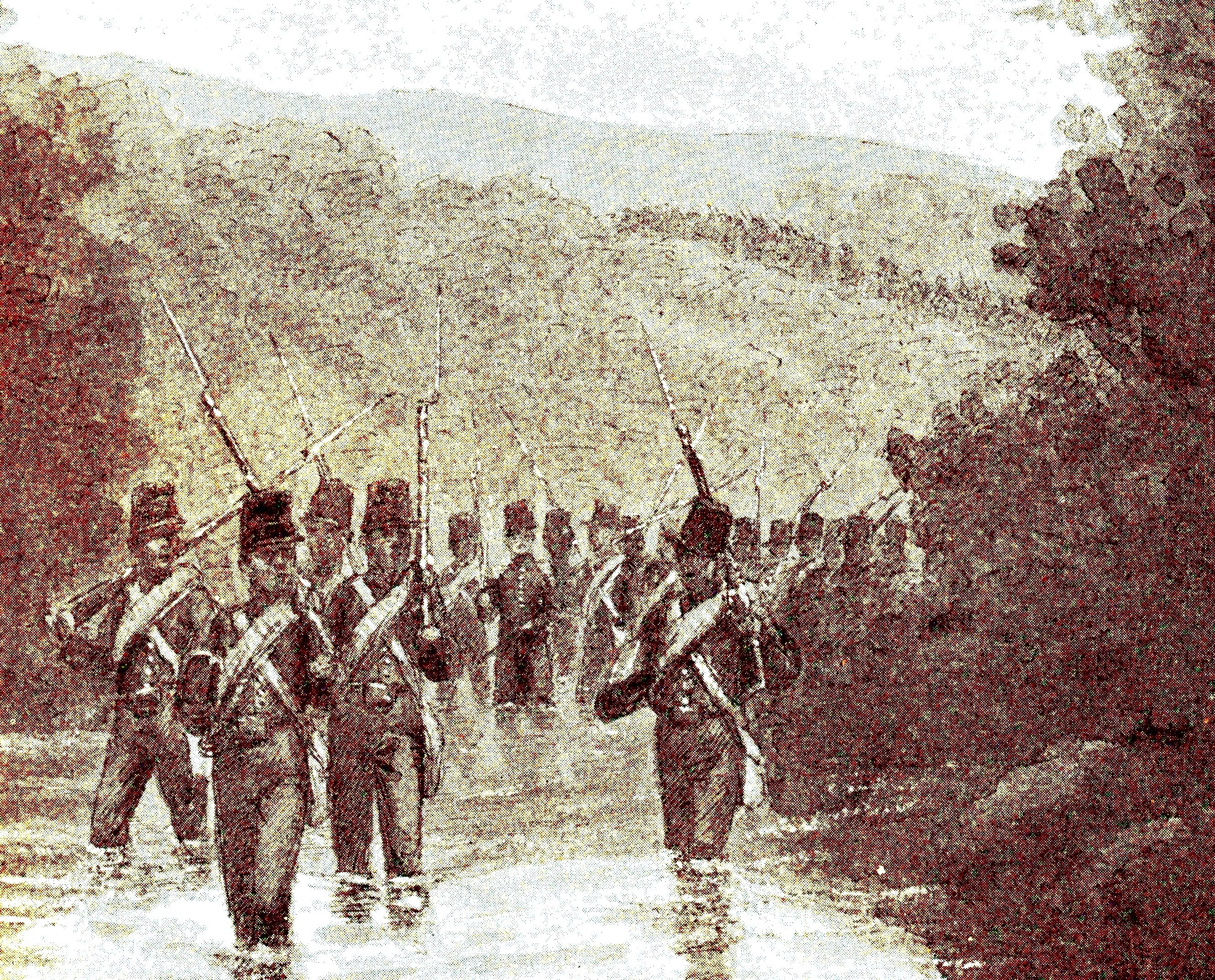
March of the 7th Battalion near Sangsit.

The expedition arrived off Buleleng in 1849. It was a considerable force of the Royal Dutch East Indies Army, composed of 100 ships, 3,000 sailors, and 5,000 well-trained soldiers, including a majority of Dutch troops.

The Dutch landed in Buleleng and marched on Singaraja, only to discover that the whole town had been abandoned. The Dutch occupied the town, but soon faced a dilemma by the arrival of a Balinese delegation. Dutch General Andreas Victor Michiels had been ordered not to enter into negotiations with the Balinese, but to capture dead or alive the Rajas of Buleleng and Karangasem and Patih Jelantik. Hoping to lure these leaders into his grasp Michiels agreed to talk. In an apparent effort to awe his enemy Michiels ordered thousands of his troops to line the western side of the Singaraja main road. However, the plan to capture Jelantik and the Raja had to be abandoned, as they arrived with over 10,000 troops of their own who lined the other side of the street. With the two opposing armies standing literally face to face an extremely dangerous situation had developed. Michiels now had no choice but to pretend he was interested in negotiation since any attempt to capture the Balinese leaders would be sure to give way to a bloody pitched battle. Thus Michiels met with the Balinese and informed them that if they followed the general agreements laid out in the 1841-1843 treaties and destroyed all their fortifications then the government would be appeased. With the rejection of the ultimatum by the Balinese, war became the only option. On 15 April around 4,000 Netherlands Indies soldiers began the steep march to Jagaraga where they met with stiff Balinese resistance.

When they saw their situation was desperate, the Balinese committed the first Puputan, or mass-suicide, the Dutch would witness in their conflicts with Bali. In this encounter, the Dutch lost 34 men, and the Balinese thousands, including the wife of Jelantik, who was part of the Puputan. I Gusti Ketut Jelantik and the ruler of Buleleng managed to escape to allied Karangasem.

== Southern Bali campaign ==
Reluctant to follow them over land, the Dutch returned to their ships and sailed to Southern Bali, where they landed in Padang Bai in order to attack Klungkung, nominal overlord of Buleleng. In the meantime, however, the Dutch managed to establish an alliance with neighbouring Lombok against Karangasem, an old enemy of Lombok. Lombok troops were sent onboard Dutch ships, and ambushed Buleleng leaders. In this encounter both Jelantik and the Raja of Buleleng were killed, and the ruler of Karangasem committed ritual suicide.

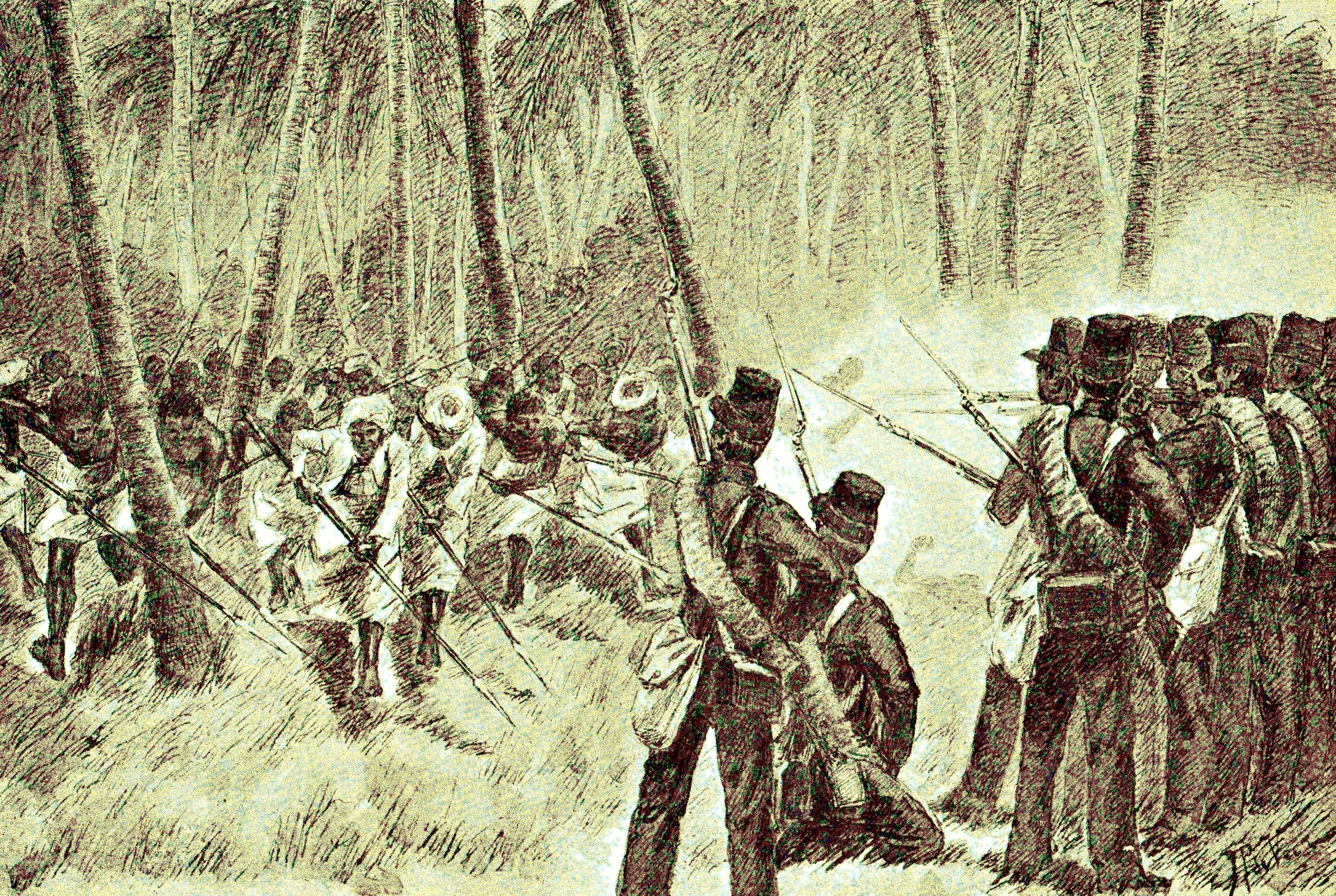
Attack of the Balinese in Kosamba.

The Dutch continued their campaign into Klungkung, occupying Goa Lawah and Kusamba. The climate and diseases were taking their toll on the Dutch troops, which were in a precarious position. An outbreak of dysentery among Dutch troops prevented them from striking a decisive blow. The Dutch suffered heavy casualties when Dewa Agung Istri Kanya led a night offensive against the Dutch in Kusamba, killing the commander Major General Michiels. The Dutch were forced to retreat to their ships, confronted by a force of 33,000 Balinese from Badung, Gianyar, Tabanan and Klungkung. This resulted in a stalemate.

== Treaty ==
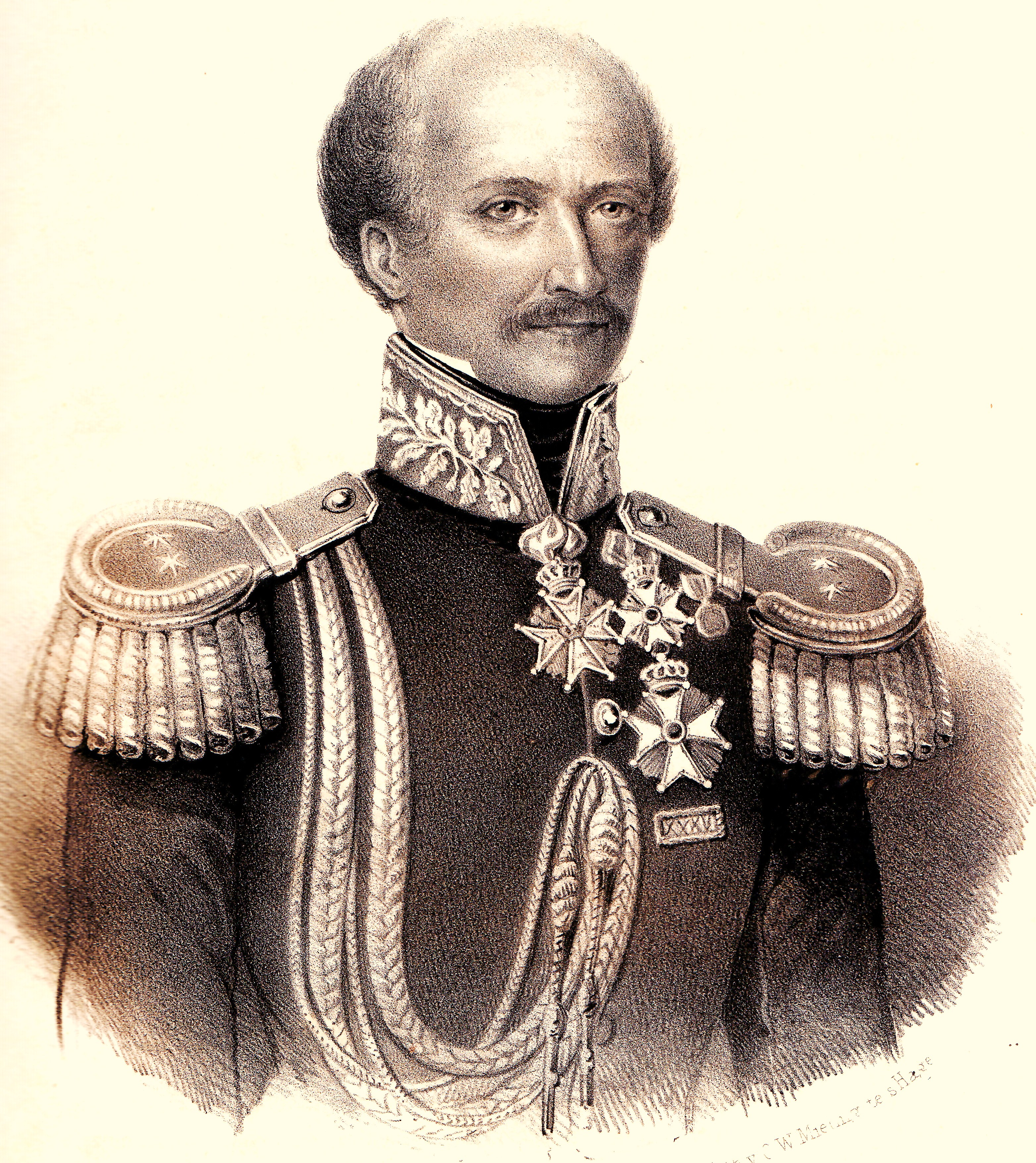
General Andreas Victor Michiels was killed by Klunkung forces in Kosamba in 1849.

The death of Jelantik nevertheless represented a considerable blow to Balinese resistance. Through the intervention of the trader Mads Lange and the ruler Kesiman of Badung, a new treaty was signed in July 1849, giving control over Buleleng and Jembrana to the Dutch. The ruler of Lombok obtained control over Karangasem. The Dutch had their headquarters in Singaraja, where a Dutch Controller ruled over the local Raja from 1855.

== See also ==
- History of Bali
