= Dutch intervention in northern Bali (1846) =

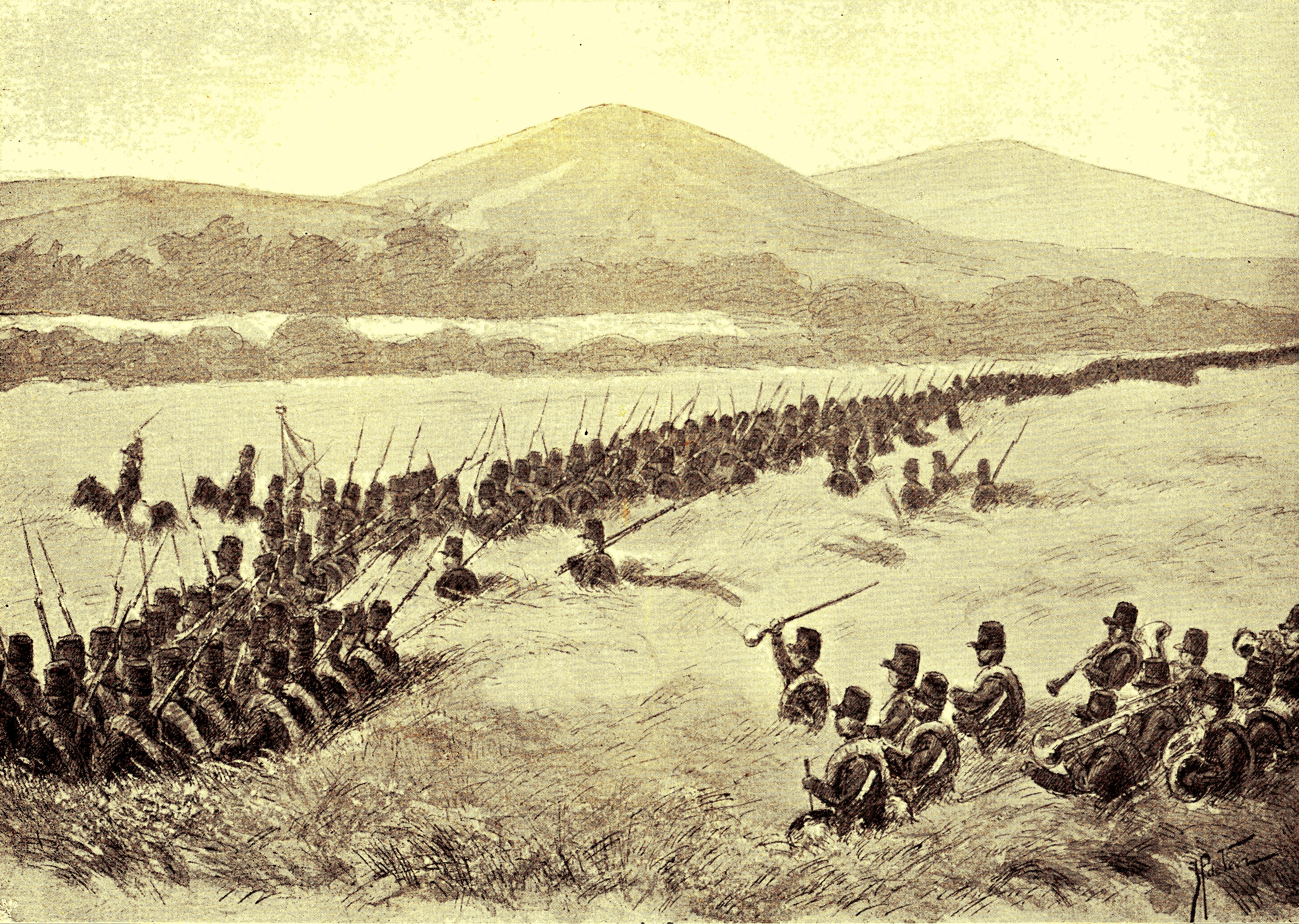
- The Dutch 7th Battalion advancing in Bali in 1846.
Date	June 1846
Location	Bali
Result	Dutch victory
Territorial changes	Northern Bali captured by the Dutch

Belligerents
Dutch East Indies	Bali Kingdom: Kingdom of Buleleng; Kingdom of Karangasem

Commanders and leaders
Engelbertus Batavus van den Bosch; Gerhardus Bakker; Abraham Johannes de Smit van den Broecke; Cornelis Albert de Brauw	I Gusti Ketut Jelantik

Strength
2 frigates 4 steamships 12 schooners 40 smaller ships 1,700 soldiers	+10,000 fighters

The Dutch intervention in Northern Bali in 1846 was the first in a long series of Dutch military interventions on Bali island, until total control was achieved with the Dutch intervention in Bali in 1908. The Dutch used as a pretext Balinese salvage claims over shipwrecks, which were customary to the Balinese, but unacceptable to the Dutch.

The expedition arrived off Buleleng in June 1846. It was composed of 2 frigates, 4 steamships, 12 schooners, 40 smaller ships, 1,700 soldiers including 400 Europeans and 230 cannons. The port was fortified by Balinese forces, and the frigates bombarded it. After a landing, the Dutch forces were able to capture and destroy the royal palace at Singaraja.

The Balinese agreed to recognize the treaties and to accommodate a small Dutch garrison. Once the main Dutch force had returned to Java, the local Balinese ruler Jelantik refused to pay the agreed settlement to the Dutch and endeavoured to unite Balinese forces against them.

A second expedition would be undertaken in 1848, Dutch intervention in Northern Bali (1848), which would also fail against Jelantik. Finally however in 1849, the Dutch intervention in Bali (1849), was able to take control of the northern Bali kingdoms of Buleleng and Jembrana.
