= Dutch intervention in northern Bali (1848) =

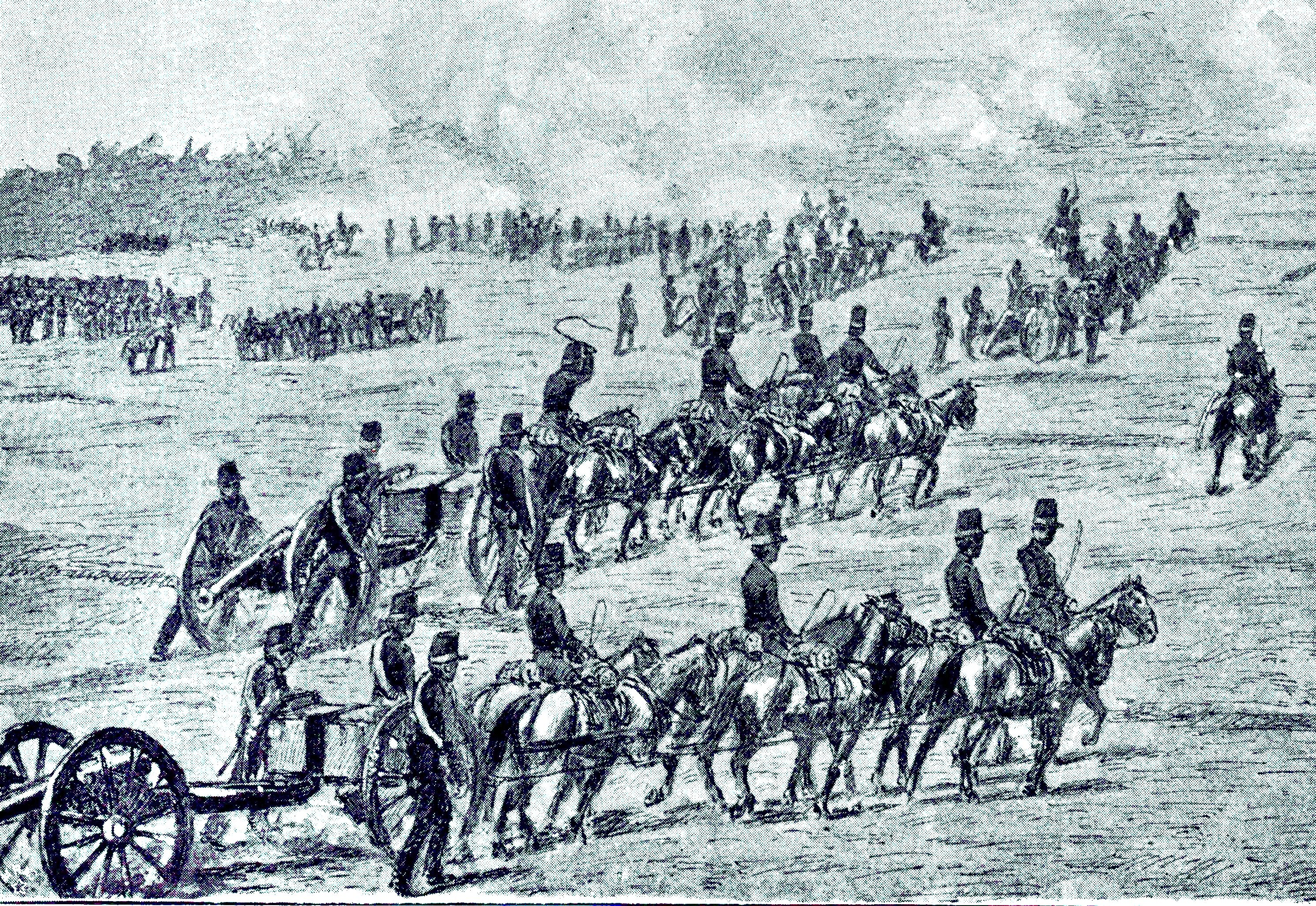
- Dutch artillery during the intervention
Date	May 7, 1848-1850
Location	Bali, Indonesia
Result	Dutch victory

Belligerents
Dutch East Indies; Lombok	Bali Kingdom: Kingdom of Buleleng; Kingdom Klungkung; Kingdom of Karangasem

Commanders and leaders
(Dutch East Indies) Andreas Victor Michiels	I Gusti Ketut Jelantik †

Strength
2,400 soldiers	14,500 soldiers 1,500 riflemen

Casualties and losses
200 killed	1,000s

The Dutch intervention in northern Bali was the second in a long series of six Dutch military interventions on Bali island, until total control was achieved with the Dutch intervention in Bali in 1908. The Dutch used as a pretext Balinese salvage claims over shipwrecks, which were customary to the Balinese, but unacceptable under International law.

The expedition arrived in 2,400 men, a third of which was composed of Europeans, the rest being Javanese and Madurese soldiers, as well as one company of Africans, probably from the Dutch colony in Ghana. The force landed in Bali on 7 May 1848 in the area of Sangsit.

The Balinese numbered 16,000, including about 1,500 equipped with firearms under Jelantik. After the Dutch landing, the Balinese withdrew to their fortified position in Jagaraga about 4 kilometers away.

== Battle of Jagaraga ==
The Dutch attacked the Balinese in Jagaraga despite the intense tropical heat. The Balinese counter-attacked and routed the Dutch, who left 200 dead and had to reimbark on their ships.

After this humiliating defeat, the Dutch would return, this time successfully, with the Dutch intervention in Bali (1849).
