= Camp Victory (New South Wales) =

Royal Netherlands East Indies Army base during World War II in Australia

Coordinates: 28.8347°S 153.0277°E

Camp Victory, also known as Camp Casino, was an Australian Army and Royal Netherlands East Indies Army (KNIL) base and prisoner of war camp, used during World War II, near Casino, New South Wales, Australia. The Dutch government-in-exile was given extraterritorial rights over the management and conduct of the base. It was named Camp Victory by the Dutch government in the hopes of a swift recapture of the Dutch East Indies. The camp consisted mostly of tents, with only a few buildings for administrative, ablutions and recreational purposes.

== Military Units ==
=== Australian Army ===
The Australian 25th Brigade was reconstituted in Casino and established Camp Casino at the start of 1942. As part of the 7th Division, they had just returned from the fighting in the North Africa and the Middle East. With Brigade Headquarters being housed at the Casino Drill Hall in town and some sub-units being stationed at the Casino Showgrounds, called Camp Rawalpindi. Leave periods were instituted for the returning soldiers, as many of them were from New South Wales and Queensland. This was followed by training and conducting anti-invasion exercises in the region. This Brigade moved to the Caboolture to begin training for fighting in New Guinea at the end of May 1942.

The Australian 15th Brigade, as part of the 3rd Division then took over the facilities around Casino. They operated in the region from May, 1942 until they also moved to Queensland and for action in New Guinea, in September 1942. During their stay, they prepared for a possible invasion along the Australian coastline. Initially as a Commonwealth Military Force unit initially, many drafts of soldiers were transferred to the Australian Imperial Force(AIF) to provide reinforcements for units serving in New Guinea. The Brigade was reorganised and transferred to the AIF on their departure from Casino.

=== Royal Netherlands East Indies Army ===
The Australian Government gave extraterritorial rights to the Dutch, for the use of several military bases around Australia, including Camp Casino. It was soon occupied by the Royal Netherlands East Indies Army and the camp was renamed Camp Victory, in the hope of the liberation of the Netherlands and the Dutch East Indies.

Known in Dutch as the Koninklijk Nederlands Indisch Leger or KNIL for short. From a pre-war strength of 120,000 soldiers, only a few thousand had managed to be evacuated after the Japanese Invasion of the Dutch East Indies. The 1st Infantry Battalion (KNIL) was the primary military unit to be trained at the facility, moving from Camp Darley, near Bacchus Marsh, Victoria.

The 1st Company had about 500 Surinamese and Dutch Antilles soldiers, who were not allowed to serve in Europe. This was based on racism grounds, in the belief that their service would antagonise South African Army soldiers they might serve alongside. Despite this, these troops were poorly treated by their Dutch commander and other officers at Casino. They were forbidden to enter the town or to interact with the local White Australians, together with a lack of medical care or social services. The coloured soldiers were also paid less than their Dutch counterparts and paid in Japanese Invasion Money that could only be used within the camp.

The 2nd Company consisted of soldiers who were evacuated from the Dutch East Indies after their occupation by the Japanese. They were predominantly from the Western Islands of Java, Sumatra, Bali and Lombok.

The Papuan Battalion was formed from Dutch New Guinea and Moluccan soldiers. Trained as light infantry and intended to establish Dutch Colonial rule and garrison duties in newly liberated regions of Dutch New Guinea and Ambon, Morotai and surrounding islands.

A Technical Battalion was also based at Camp Victory. This was mostly made up of oil industry workers that had managed to be evacuated from Dutch Borneo, with the intention of operating the oil fields quickly after their recapture.

A Labour Battalion was a semi-military unit, consisting of political prisoners held at the camp and used for general labour tasks at Camp Victory. Some were sent to Camp Columbia to construct the Dutch East Indies Government-In-Exile headquarters at Wacol near Brisbane, Queensland.

The Netherlands East Indies Forces Intelligence Service conducted field training at Camp Victory, from their school at Camp Columbia. They trained to support intelligence operations across New Guinea, Borneo and Moluccan Islands.

In 1945, there was a plan for up to 30,000 Dutch soldiers to be recruited from the newly liberated regions of the Netherlands. Australia accepted responsibility for equipping and training these troops at locations, such as Camp Victory. The end of the war came about before any intakes of soldiers arrived.

=== Royal Netherlands East Indies Army Air Force ===
Later in the war was two units of the Royal Netherlands East Indies Army Air Force, in Dutch the Militaire Luchtvaart van het Koninklijk Nederlands-Indisch Leger (ML-KNIL). By the end of 1945, it was intended for 5,000 service members to be recruited, especially in newly liberated regions of the Netherlands, then equipped and trained in Australia before service across the South West Pacific.

They established military aviation training for Dutch service personnel was also conducted at Casino Airport, with the aviators staying at Camp Victory. Many Dutch aviators enlisted in 1944 and 1945, with the liberation of the Netherlands, and were sent to Australia for training. The surrender of Japan in August, 1945 curtailed the need for the Dutch airmen. The initial intakes had only just completed infantry training. With their training delayed and they often ended up guarding the Indonesian KNIL soldiers at the end of World War 2 instead of flying. Further recruitment was discontinued.

== Prison ==
=== Political Prisoners ===
Fearing that Indonesian Nationalists would join with the Imperial Japanese forces to fight the Dutch colonialists, political prisoners of the Tanah Merah Prison were brought to Camp Victory, in 1942. The Netherlands East Indies government-in-exile (in Australia), feared that partisan armies, which would prejudice postwar reimposition of Dutch colonial rule in the Indies. Thus they organised for the prisoners to be brought to Australia and to be interned as 'prisoners of war' despite being non-combatants. This did not fit entirely well with the host country, and on 7 December 1943, the Tanah Merah prisoners were freed from their Australian prison camps.

=== Indonesian KNIL Soldiers ===
However with the end of the war drawing near, there were great fears about Indonesian Nationalism amongst their soldiers of Indonesian descent. Thus at the end of the war, the ethnically Dutch soldiers imprisoned some of their Indonesian counterparts within Camp Victory. Many Javanese soldiers refused to work and started strikes within the camp at the end of the war. They were then arrested, court-martialled and then imprisoned within the camp.

KNIL soldiers of Indonesian ethnicity were brought from all across Australia to Camp Victory to also be imprisoned after conducted similar strikes or refusing to work. This did not sit well many within the local Casino community, especially as several protests, hunger strikes and riots took place within the confines of the Camp, with some fearing a mass breakout. The inmates hung one prisoner suspected of being a thief and Dutch soldiers killed one Indonesian prisoner 13 bullet wounds in one incident, wounded two others while trying to remove a prisoner from the camp. The Maritime unions on Australia's docks refused cargo or shipping between Australia and Dutch controlled ports, as a protest. In 1946, the prisoners were transferred to Brisbane, court martialled and transported to Dutch controlled prisons in the Dutch East Indies. With the last prisoners leaving, the Camp Victory was closed and the land returned to the control of the Australian Government. The base had been in operation from 1942 until 1946.

== Military Deaths ==
Several deaths occurred with KNIL soldiers during training, two drownings, vehicle accidents or in one case, walking into a propeller. Each was buried with military honours at the Casino General Cemetery, opposite the camp. Ten soldiers of the KNIL are buried there.
