= Van Mook–MacArthur Civil Affairs Agreement =

1944 agreement between the United States and Dutch government-in-exile

The Van Mook–MacArthur Civil Affairs Agreement was an agreement between the United States and the Dutch government-in-exile. It concerned the jurisdiction over and administration of civil affairs in Dutch East Indies territory liberated by an Allied expeditionary force during WWII.

== Background ==
The Constitution of the Netherlands of 1922 had abolished any juridical distinction between the European territories of the Dutch Empire and the former “overseas” or “colonial” territories. Constitutionally, therefore, the Kingdom of the Netherlands was an integral whole consisting of four administrative areas:

- The Netherlands
- Suriname
- Territory of Curaçao
- Dutch East Indies

Under normal conditions, the Crown was charged by the Constitution of the Netherlands with the “supreme administration” over the Dutch East Indies, while the “general administration” of the East Indies was entrusted to the Governor General. Since the Japanese occupation of the Dutch East Indies, both the supreme administration and the general administration of Indies affairs (Both Dutch and West Indies) rests with the Dutch government-in-exile acting with the advice of various agencies such as;

- Ministry for Overseas Territories,
- Ministry for the Coordination of Warfare of the Kingdom
- Netherlands Indies Commission for Australia and New Zealand (NINDICOM)

== Agreements ==
“We have let you down after you went to war for us. It is my duty to restore you to Indonesia”, General Douglas MacArthur declared a month after the capitulation of the Royal Netherlands East Indies Army (KNIL) in Java to Lieutenant Governor-General of the Dutch East Indies Hubertus van Mook. This happened during an interview in Melbourne, April 4, 1942.

The first agreement for postwar policy planning in regard to Japan and areas under Japanese control, between the United States and the Netherlands, were signed in London, on May 16, 1944. It was agreed that the Allied forces in the liberated areas would be utilized for NICA's administrative tasks, but due to political conflicts with the American State Department - which wanted the Netherlands to commit to a date for the colony's independence or full autonomy according to the Atlantic Charter, signed by the Dutch government - it took until 10 December 1944 for the parties (Hubertus van Mook and Douglas MacArthur) to sign the Van Mook–MacArthur Civil Affairs Agreement. Its key provision was that areas recaptured by Allied troops would revert to Dutch rule via the Netherlands Indies Civil Administration (NICA).

The first NICA detachments landed at Hollandia in New Guinea, April 1944. Their commander was Colonel C. Giebel, Staff Officer NICA (SONICA). The CONICA was authorised to execute emergency measures and to carry out the orders of the Military Authority. By the time Japan surrendered, NICA units and 1st Infantry Battalion (KNIL) had landed in New Guinea (Hollandia, Biak, Numfur and Manokwari), the Moluccas (Morotai) and Borneo (Tarakan and Balikpapan).

On August 15, 1945, it was announced that the entire Dutch East Indies would be transferred from the South West Pacific Area (SWPA) to the South East Asia Command (SEAC). The liberation of Sumatra, Java, Bali and Lombok was now the responsibility of the British. The Australian troops were assigned to the occupation of Borneo, Celebes, the Moluccas and the other islands in the eastern East Indies. August 24, 1945 the Anglo–Dutch Civil Affairs Agreement was established and the Van Mook–MacArthur Civil Affairs Agreement expired.
