= 1st Infantry Battalion (KNIL) =

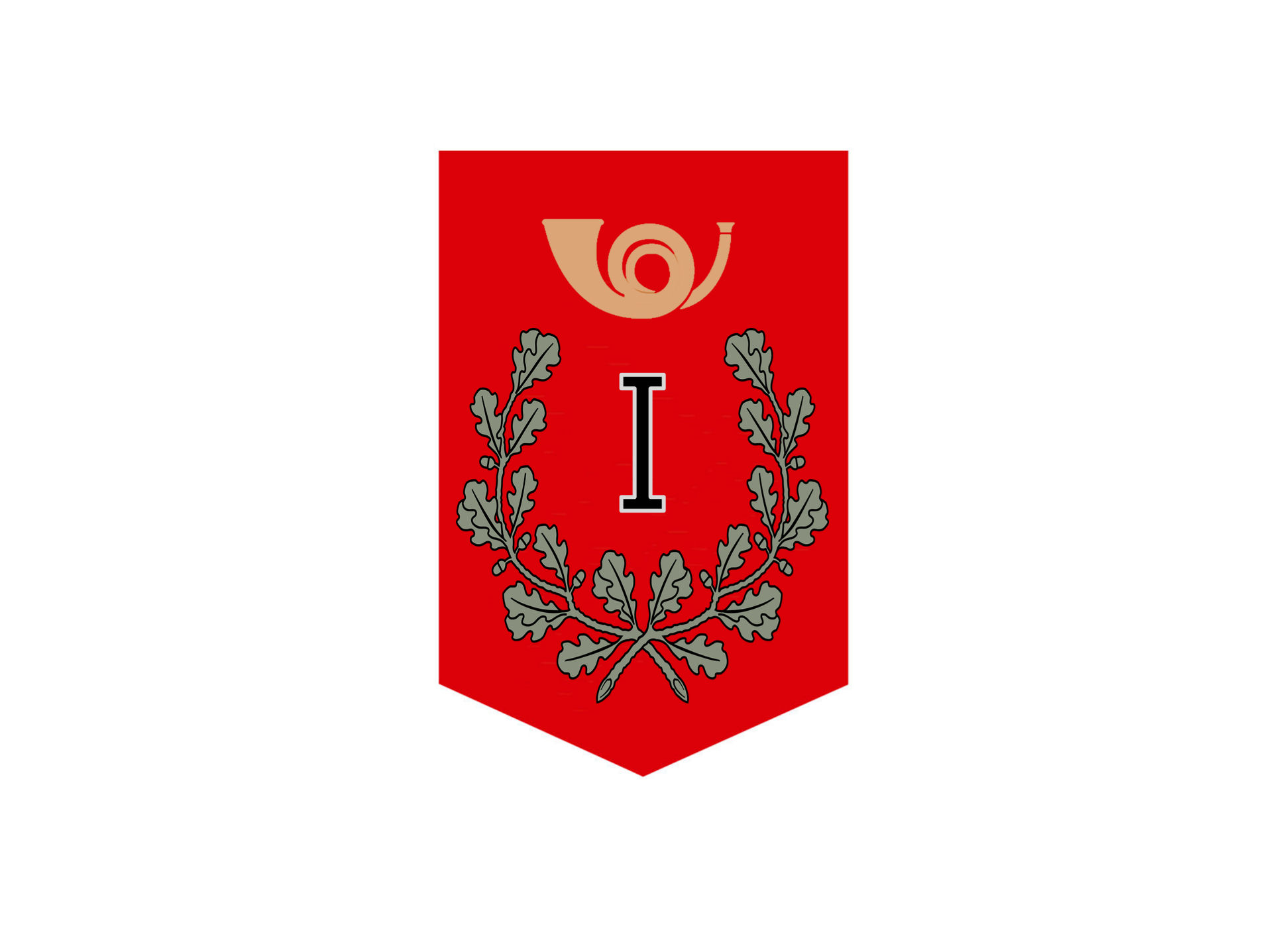
- 1st Infantry Battalion KNIL insigna
- Branch: Royal Netherlands East Indies Army
- Type: Battalion landing team
- Size: 3,000
- Nickname: Matjans (The Tigers)
- Engagements: World War II; Indonesian National Revolution

The 1st Infantry Battalion of the Royal Netherlands East Indies Army was a Dutch colonial military unit that was active in the Dutch East Indies during World War II and the Indonesian National Revolution.

== Background ==
On March 7, 1942, just before the fall of Java, Lieutenant Governor General Huib van Mook and 14 officials flew to Australia to establish a Dutch East Indies government to continue the fight. Van Mook was recalled to London, but on April 8 the Netherlands Indies Commission for Australia and New Zealand (NINDICOM) was established. The Commission was headed by Ch. O. van der Plas and further consisted of J.E. van Hoogstraten, Raden Loekman Djajadiningrat and R.E. Smits. Its seat was located in Melbourne, where the headquarters of the Supreme Allied Commander in Asia, the American General Douglas MacArthur, was then located. The Commission worked together with the Dutch ambassador Van Aerssen Beyeren in Canberra.

== World War II ==
=== Formation ===
On June 1, 1944, at Camp Victory, near Casino, New South Wales, the 1st Battalion KNIL was founded. With this establishment the first large unit of the new KNIL was formed.

The service sections, later the "Technical Battalion" led by Lieutenant Colonel IJsseldijk, consisting of BPM and ex-KPM personnel, were intended for oil extraction immediately after the conquest of the oil fields in Tarakan and Balikpapan.

The armed forces commanded by Lieutenant Colonel Breemouer included the 1st and 2nd Cie "Overseas", consisting of Surinamese and Antillean War Volunteers; the 36 NEI Coy "Timor-Coy", evacuated from Timor to Australia in December 1942 and consisted of small interpreters and guides / battle groups, which were partly assigned to American units in the Pacific; small groups of liberated Dutch East Indies prisoners of war on New Guinea, the Bismarck Archipelago islands in the Pacific; and deployed war volunteers in the Dutch East Indies from personnel of the Princess Irene Brigade.

The armed forces were renamed 1st Infantry Battalion on November 15, 1944, and after having passed the Jungle Warfare School, they were brought into battle.

=== Structure ===
1st Battalion KNIL (3000 men). This consisted on November 15, 1944 of;

Technical Battalion (Commander Lt. Col. IJsseldijk);

- NICA (Netherlands Indies Civil Administration),
- NEFIS (Netherlands East Indies Forces Intelligence Service),
- The Technical Battalion ("Oil Battalion"),
- Papua Battalion (for deployment to New Guinea only)
- No. 120 (Netherlands East Indies) Squadron RAAF

1st Infantry Battalion KNIL

- Rudimentary staff/staff Cie
- I Inf.I.
- II Inf. I.
- 2 Military Aviation Squadrons of the Royal Netherlands Indies Army (ML-KNIL)

=== Operations ===
January 9, 1945: Landing of the US 93rd Division at Biak, and a few weeks later at Morotai. In this (at a later stage) the 1st Inf. I Bat. KNIL takes part.

May 1, 1945: Landing of the 9th Australian Division at Tarakan. The 2nd Inf. I Bat. takes part and suffers her first losses.

July 1, 1945: Landing of the 7th Australian Division at Balikpapan. The 1st Inf I Bat is part of the first landing echelon.

== Indonesian War of Independence ==
On October 4, 1945 the 1st Bat.Inf. in Batavia consisted of:

- 1st Cie KNIL
- 2nd Cie KNIL
- 6th Cie KNIL / both founded in Tarakan from the Netherlands liberated there.
- 8th Cie KNIL \ Dutch East Indies prisoners of war.

From October 1945, the Battalion was charged with ensuring order and peace in the southern and eastern fringes of Batavia. On October 10, the 5 Cie KNIL arrives from Australia, consisting of War Volunteers. On March 8, 1948 the battalion was disbanded due to demobilization. On May 26, the battalion is re-established as 1st Infantry Battalion. In February 1949 were added to the battalion:

- 5th Cion (ex 4-Inf XXII),
- 6th Cion (ex 3-Inf XII),
- 7th Cie (ex 2-Inf XXII) and two Peleton ex 4-Inf XV.
- 6-Inf I and 7-Inf I operated outside battalion level under the command of C-W Brigade and C-V Brigade.

Soldiers of Inf I were nicknamed 'the Matjans' (the Tigers) because of their camouflage suits (Jungle warfare suits).

== Commanders ==
- Lieutenant General Ludolph Hendrik van Oyen 1944–1946
- Lieutenant Colonel IJsseldijk 1944–1945
- Lieutenant Colonel Breemouer. 1944–1945
- Lieutenant Colonel F. Mollinger 1945–1946
- Lieutenant Colonel P.G. Koopmans 1946–1949
- Lieutenant Colonel C. de Jong 1949–1950
- Captain J.W. Zijlstra, commander of the 1st Inf. I Bat.

== Images ==
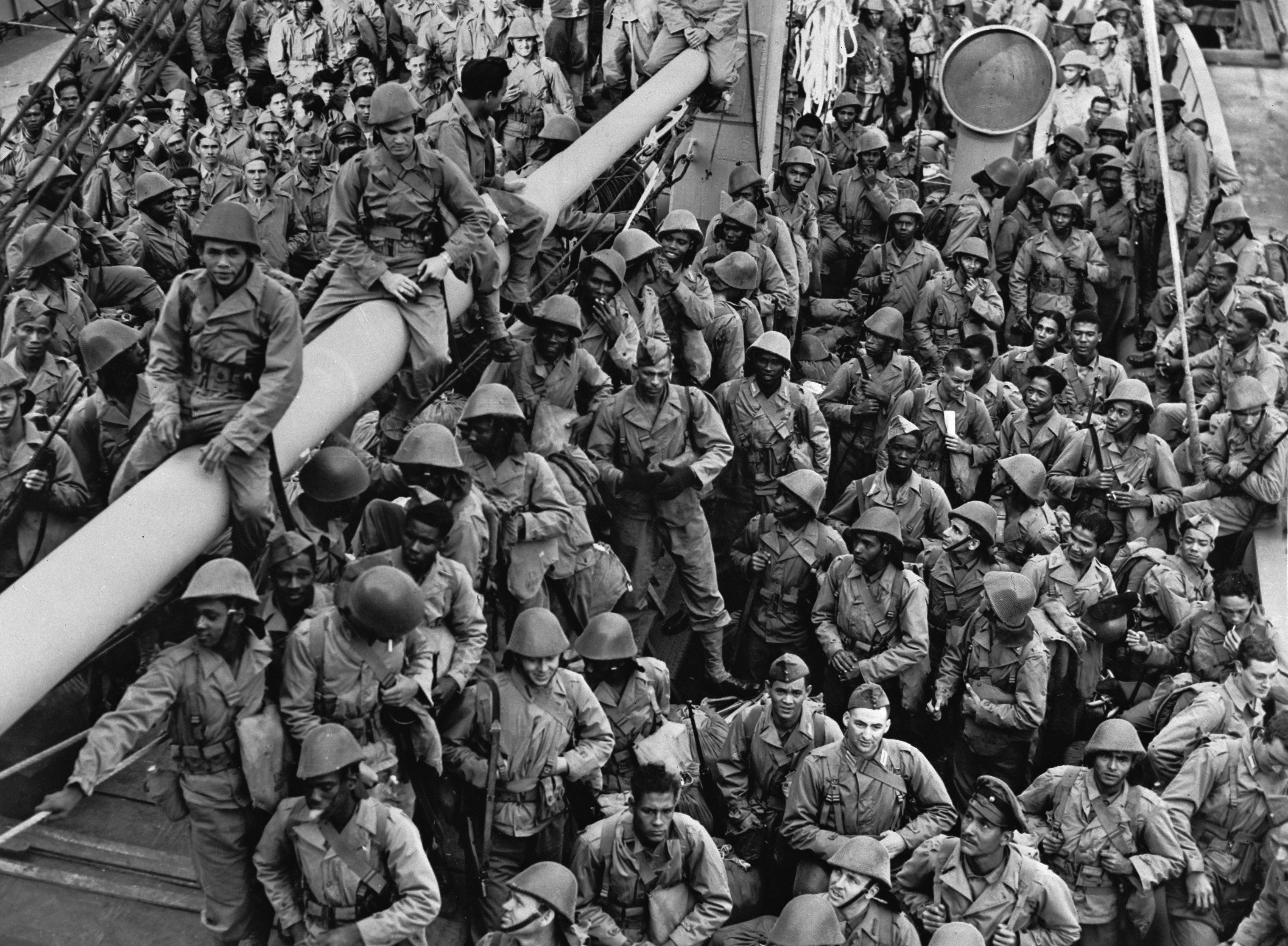
From Suriname, the Dutch West Indies, Creoles, together with Javanese and Hindus arrive in Australia (1944)

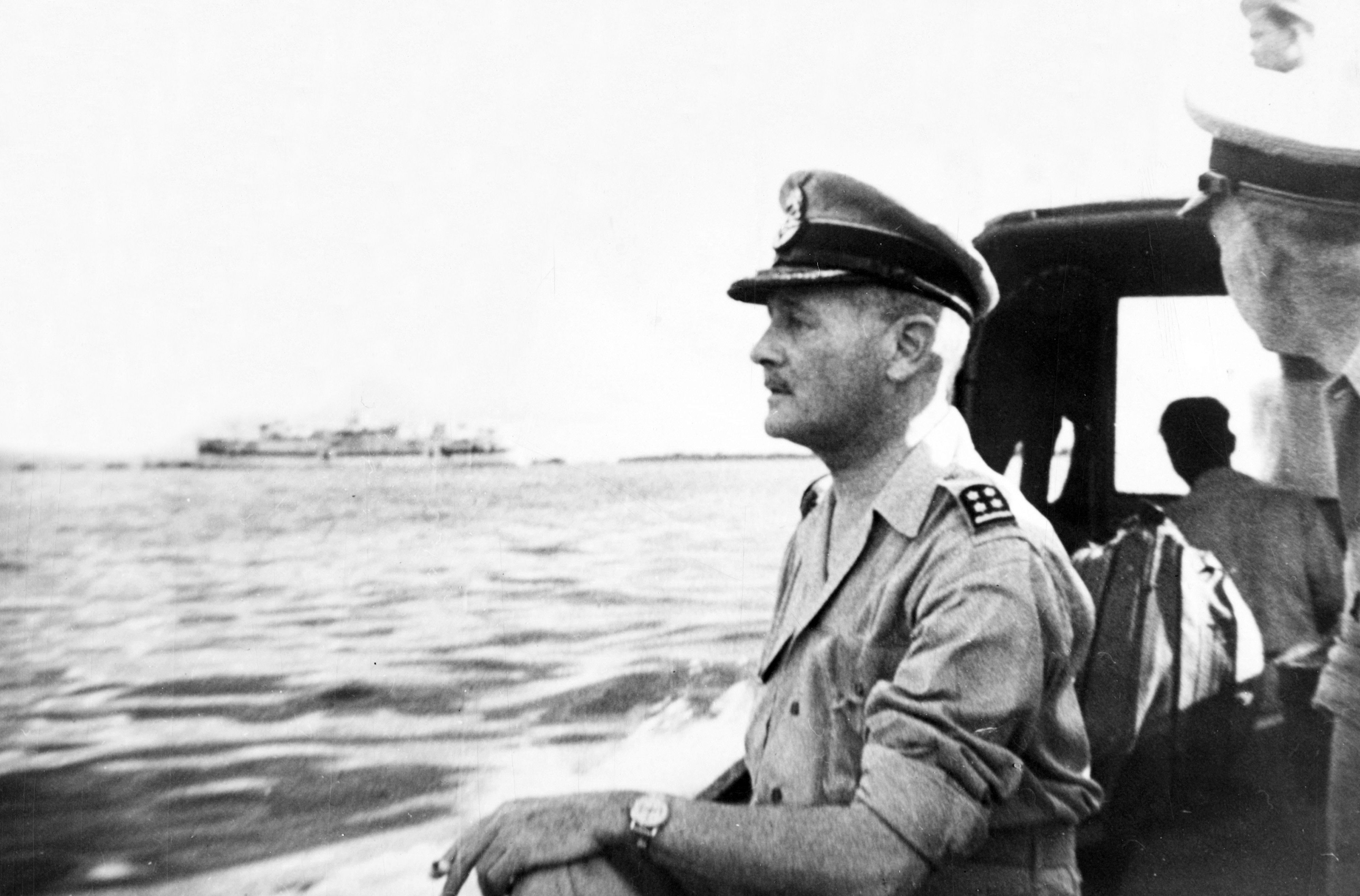
Acting KNIL commander Lt-Gen van Oyen (left) and Lt-Kol Dr. Brandon (right) are brought back to Lingkas by LST after visiting a location on Tarakan Island. (1945)

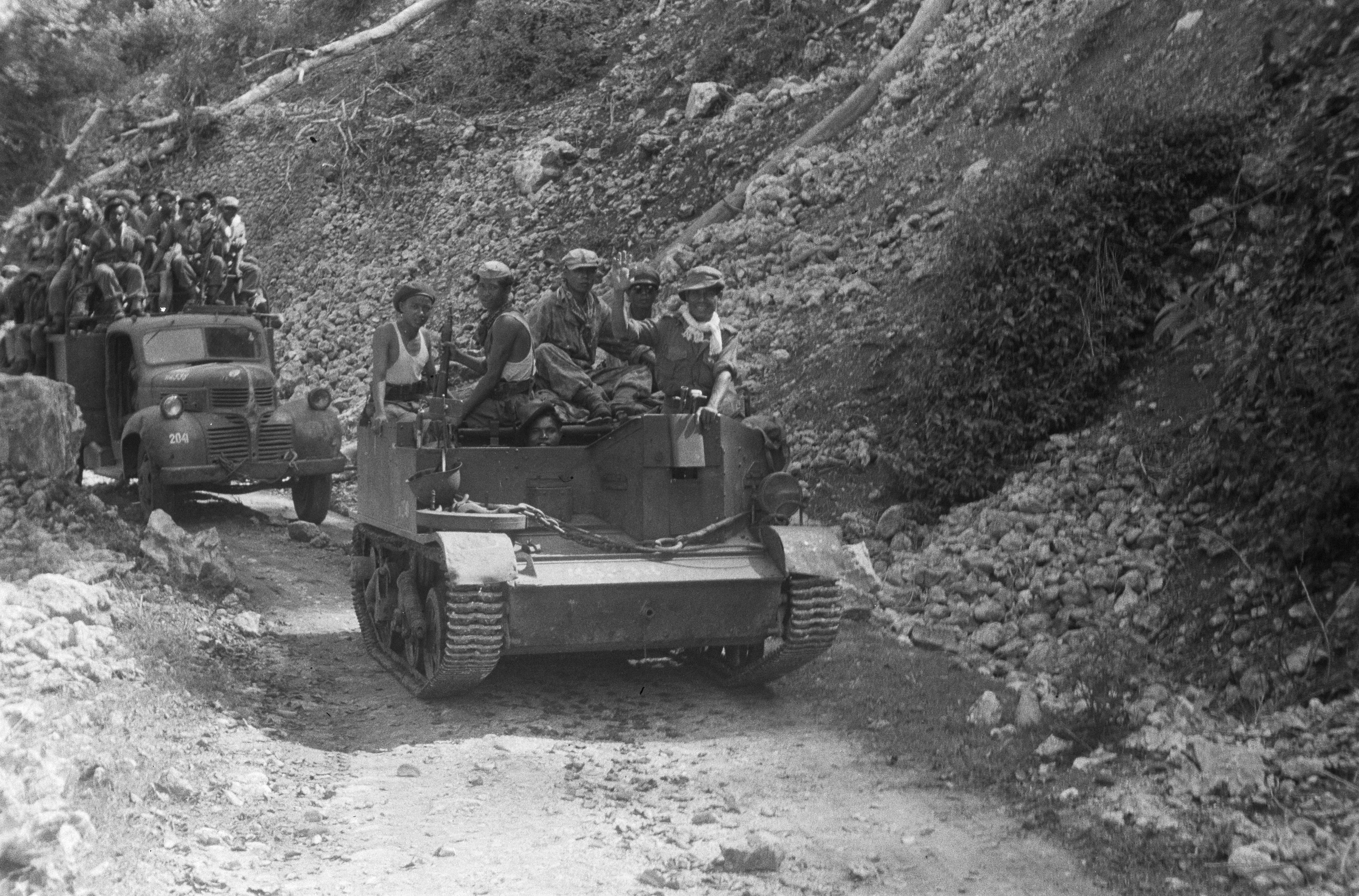
The famous 1st Infantry Battalion (KNIL)

== See also ==
- Van Mook–MacArthur Civil Affairs Agreement
