= Camp Columbia (Wacol) =

US Army military camp in Australia

Coordinates: 27°34′59.86″S 152°56′12.78″E

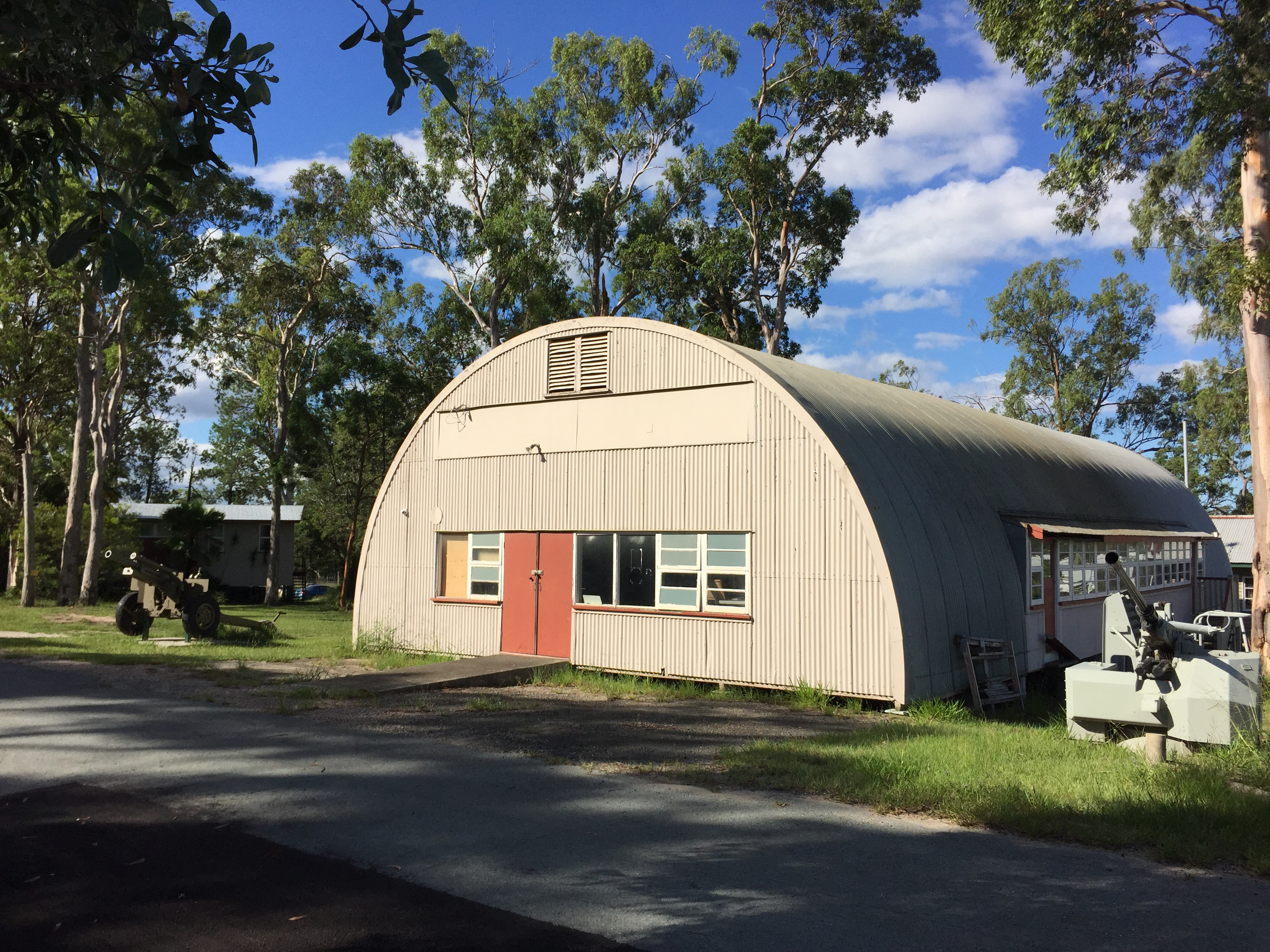
Old Wacol Military Barracks

Camp Columbia was a United States Army military camp located in Wacol, near Brisbane, Queensland, Australia. It was built during World War II to accommodate US troops. It was then used by the Dutch East Indies administration with displaced persons, a demobilisation camp, migrant reception centre, before becoming an Australian army camp, Sanananda Barracks, from 1951 to 2000.

== US military use (1942–1944) ==
Originally created as a US military motor pool, the Sixth US Army Headquarters was stationed here from April 1943. The design and construction of this and all other US camps in Brisbane was done by US Major Willard Farrar.

The camp, now under Commanding-General US Sixth Army, Walter Krueger, became an Officer Candidate School from 1942 to 1945.

== Dutch government use (1944–1946) ==
As the war progressed further north through the Pacific, the US military moved out of Camp Columbia and part of it was transferred to the Netherlands East Indies Government-In-Exile. It was then occupied by soldiers of the Royal Netherlands East Indies Army (Dutch: Koninklijk Nederlands Indisch Leger (KNIL)). The Netherlands East Indies Forces Intelligence Service (NEFIS) was headquartered here and conducted training to enable operations in support of the Allied campaigns in the South West Pacific. It also housed the Royal Netherlands East Indies Army Women's Corps after it was formed from Dutch civilians within Australia, Dutch colonies and from liberated regions of the Netherlands. The Netherlands Indies Civil Administration (NICA) was a semi-military and civilian organisation responsible for restoring the civil administration of the Dutch East Indies upon liberation. It also handled civilian refugees from the Dutch East Indies, their welfare and eventual repatriation.

The Dutch were to hand over the site back to Australia after 1 May 1946, with the 300 troops and Java evacuees moving to other camps in southern Queensland.

September 1945 saw 1500 Dutch prisoners-of-war being received at the camp after their recent release, where they would remain for a few weeks, before transported to Java or Nederlands.

Some Indonesian persons were still in the camp by September 1945, with about 400 going on strike over a waterfront labour trade dispute, related to the Indonesian National Revolution, to separate from Netherlands. The camp at this time was under the command of Lieutenant-Colonel G. A. de Stoppelaar, who had been in the Dutch East Indies for over ten years. In November 1945, seventy-four Indonesian seaman were arrested for deserting a Dutch ship, taken from the camp, and detained at the Boggo Road Gaol.

== Post-WW2 use ==
In July 1945, a month before the end of World War II in the Pacific theatre, the camp was used by the Australian military as a staging camp for the demobilisation of Australian Imperial Forces soldiers. Moving the administrative centre from the Kalinga camp, it was to handle 10 000 soldiers who were to be released in the forthcoming months. Camps were described as one of the best in Queensland, with hot and cold water, mess huts, and mess. Medical and dental equipment was to be installed to cater for the processing of soldiers.

The camp then served as a migrant reception and training centre. The camp was then known as the "Wacol East Dependants Holding Camp for Displaced Persons". Buildings were being prepared to house an initial 50 families from February 1947, the camp selected because it could accommodate up to 4600 persons. By July 1949, the camp housed 160 families, and plans were for more buildings to be converted into temporary housing for another 66 families.

== Australian army camp (1951–2000) ==
Planned by August 1950 on a 64 acres (26 ha) section, to cater for 1000 trainees, the camp became a National Service training camp once the camp sewer system was restored as the pumping stations had not been used since the US military departure. About 130 Hawksley aluminium and eight Riley-Newsum timber (imported from Lincoln, England, manufactured by H. Newsum and Sons Company Limited, to meet the shortages) prefabricated cottages were being erected for married instructional staff and other personnel. Imported Swedish prefabricated three-bedroom homes were originally planned.

By December 1951 approval had been given for the four-lane Brisbane–Ipswich highway extension to continue on from the Camp Columbia entrance.

After national service concluded in 1959, the camp was used by the Citizen Military Forces (later renamed as the Army Reserve). Sanananda Barracks, named for the 1942–1943 battle in now-Papua New Guinea, became home to the 1st Regiment, Royal Australian Artillery in the 1960s. With ageing facilities, military use reduced to mostly reserve units and cadet training. The camp closed in 2000.

The old Wacol Army Barracks had been converted into the Wacol Military Museum.

== Post-military life ==
Today the area is the residential and light industrial trade suburb of Wacol.

== See also ==
- Moreton Correctional Centre
