= Royal Netherlands East Indies Army =

Dutch colonial military

- Koninklijk Nederlands Indisch Leger
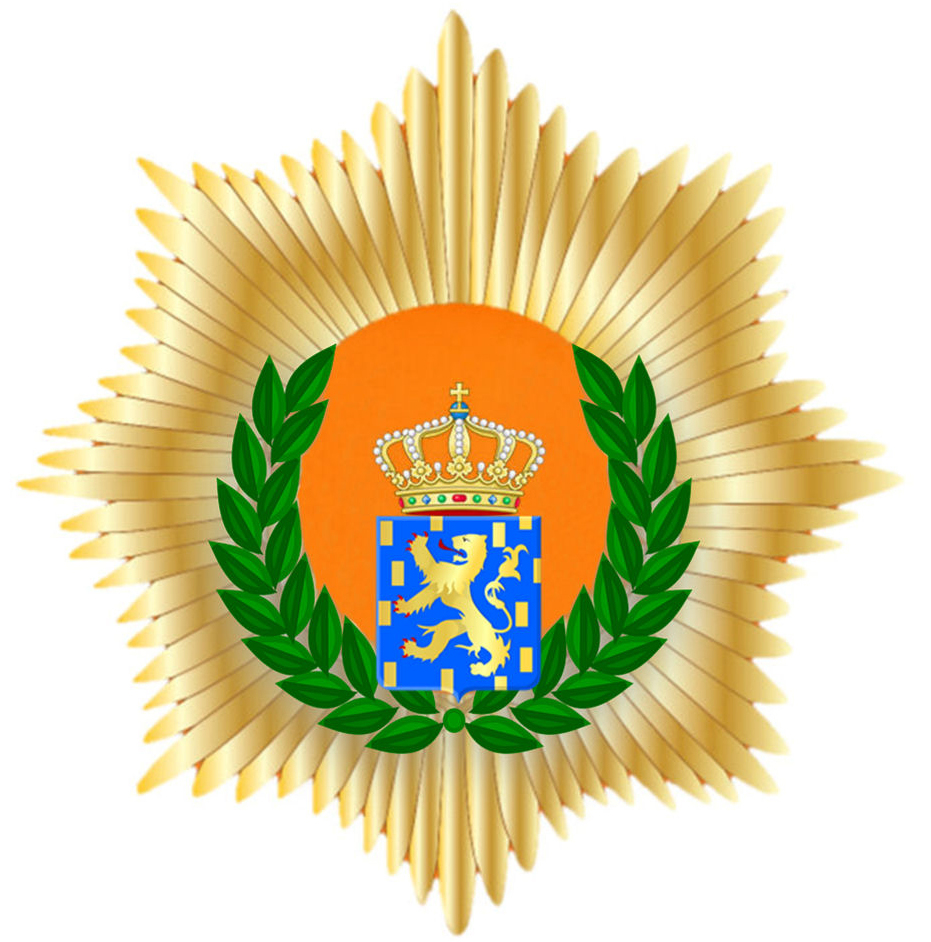
- Royal Netherlands East Indies Army coat of arms
- Active: 14 September 1814–26 July 1950
- Countries: Dutch East Indies
- Allegiance: Netherlands
- Type: Army
- Headquarters: Bandung, Dutch East Indies
- Nickname: KNIL
- Engagements: War of Pattimura 1817; First expedition to Palembang 1819; Second expedition to Palembang 1821; Expedition to the West Coast of Borneo 1823; First Bone War 1824–1825; Java War 1825–1830; Dutch expedition on the west coast of Sumatra 1831; First Sumatran expedition 1832; Padri War 1821–1837; Second Sumatran expedition 1838; Expeditions to Bali: Dutch intervention in northern Bali (1846); Dutch intervention in northern Bali (1848); Dutch intervention in Bali (1849); Expedition to the western section of Borneo 1850–1854; Expedition against the Chinese in Montrado 1854–1855; War on Nias Island (1838–1863): Nias Expedition 1855–1864; Palembang Highlands Expeditions 1851–1859; Banjarmasin War 1859–1867; Second Bone War 1859–1860; Pasoemah Expedition 1864–1868; Sunggal War 1872–1895; Batak War 1878–1907; Mandor rebellion 1884–1885; Jambi uprising 1885; Dutch intervention in Lombok and Karangasem 1894; Unrest in Java 1900–1907; Merauke uprising 1902; Campaigns against Dayak; Kerinci Expedition 1903; Actions on Yapen 1903; Resistance on Tidore 1904; Aceh War 1873–1904: Edi Expedition 1890; Pedir Expedition 1897–1898; Third Bone War 1905; Dutch intervention in Bali (1906); Dutch intervention in Bali (1908); Communist rebellion in Sumatra 1927; World War II: Malayan campaign 1941–1942; Dutch East Indies campaign 1941–1942; New Guinea campaign 1942–1945; Borneo campaign 1945; Indonesian National Revolution 1945–1949

Commanders
- Commander: See list
- Notable commanders: Hein ter Poorten; Simon Spoor

Aircraft flown
- Army Air Force

The Royal Netherlands East Indies Army (Dutch: Koninklijk Nederlands Indisch Leger; KNIL, pronounced [knɪl]; Indonesian: Tentara Kerajaan Hindia Belanda) was the military force maintained by the Kingdom of the Netherlands in its colony of the Dutch East Indies, in areas that are now part of Indonesia. The KNIL's air arm was the Royal Netherlands East Indies Army Air Force. Elements of the Royal Netherlands Navy and Government Navy were also stationed in the Netherlands East Indies.

== History ==
=== 1814–1942 ===
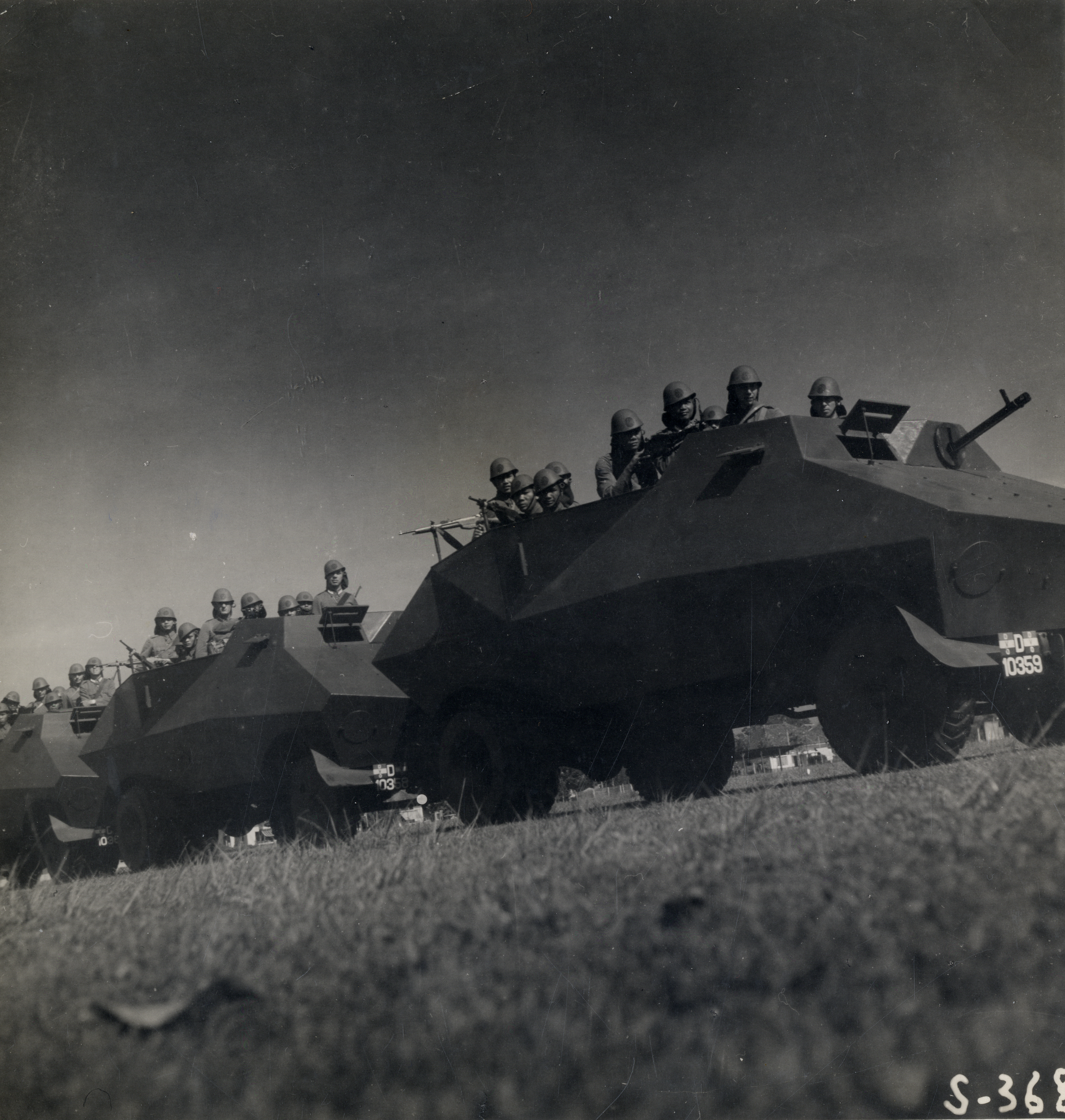
KNIL armoured troops 1941 one year before the Japanese invasion of the Dutch East Indies

The KNIL was formed by royal decree on 14 September 1814. It was not part of the Royal Netherlands Army, but a separate military arm specifically formed for service in the Netherlands East Indies. Its establishment coincided with the Dutch drive to expand colonial rule from the 17th century area of control to the far larger territories constituting the Dutch East Indies seventy years later.

The KNIL was involved in many campaigns against indigenous groups in the area including the Padri War (1821–1845), the Java War (1825–1830), crushing the final resistance of Bali inhabitants to colonial rule in 1849, and the prolonged Aceh War (1873–1904). In 1894, Lombok and Karangasem were annexed in response to reports of the local Balinese aristocracy oppressing the native Sasak people. Bali was finally taken under full control with the Dutch intervention in Bali (1906) and the final Dutch intervention in Bali (1908).

In the nineteenth and early twentieth centuries, the KNIL resumed the conquest of the Indonesian archipelago. After 1904 the Netherlands East Indies were considered pacified, with no large-scale armed opposition to Dutch rule until World War II, and the KNIL served a mainly defensive role protecting the Dutch East Indies from the possibility of foreign invasion.

Once the archipelago was considered pacified the KNIL was mainly involved with military policing tasks. To ensure a sizeable European military segment in the KNIL and reduce costly recruitment in Europe, the colonial government introduced obligatory military service for all resident male conscripts in the European legal class in 1917. In 1922 a supplemental legal enactment introduced the creation of the Home Guard (Dutch: Landstorm) for European conscripts older than 32.

=== World War II ===
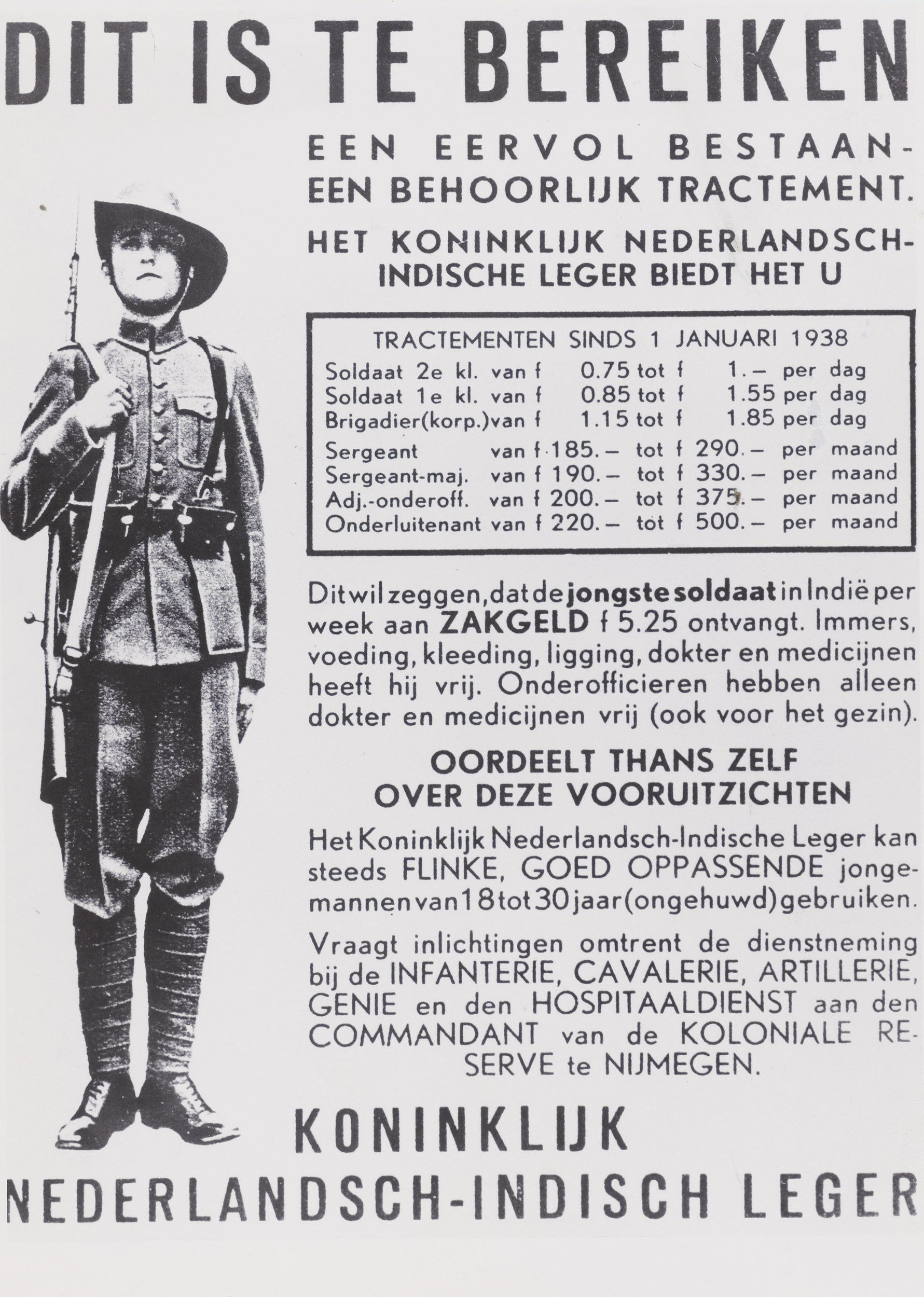
Poster for recruitment for the KNIL. 1938

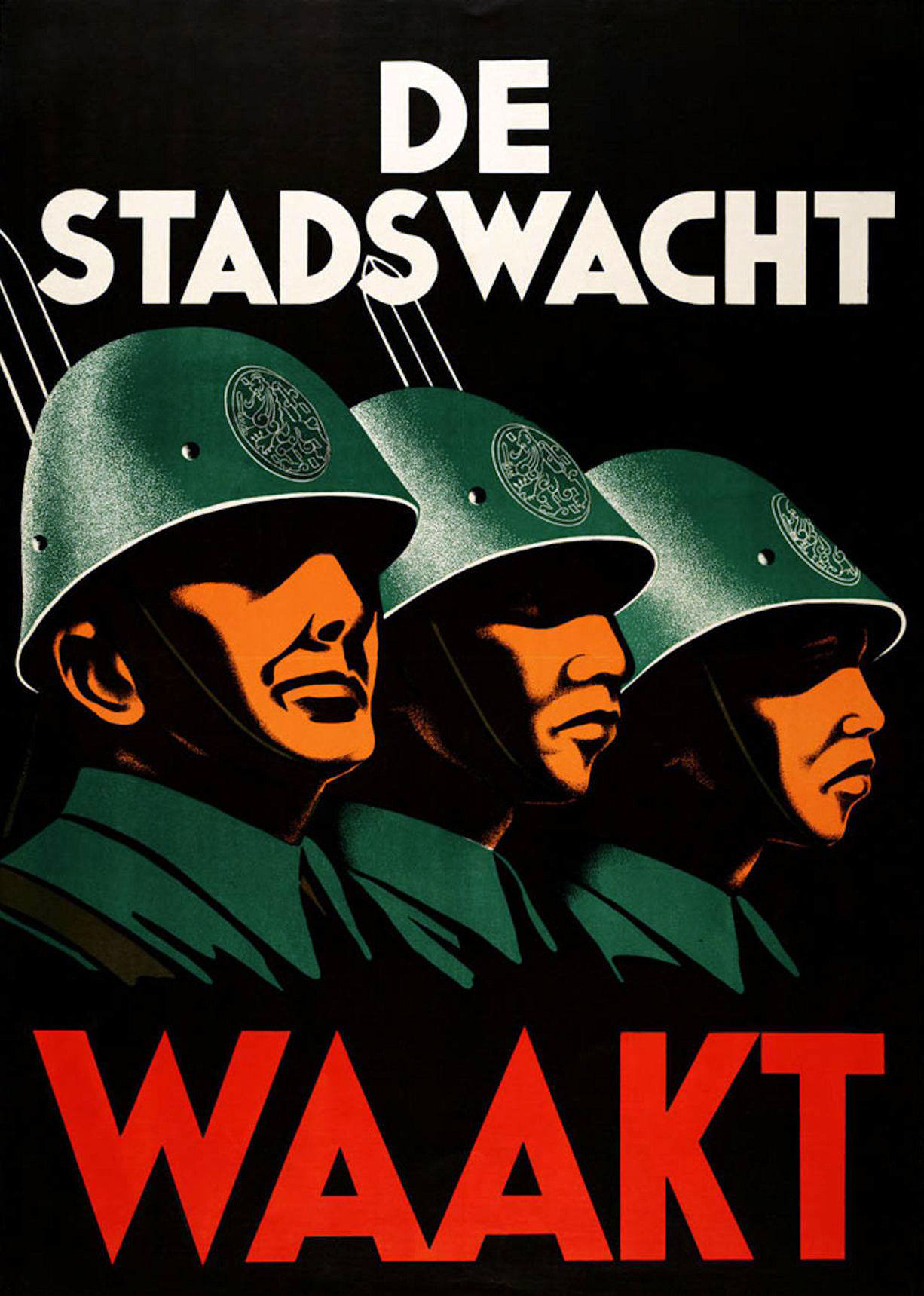
Home Guard poster (1941)

Dutch forces in the Netherlands East Indies were severely weakened by the defeat and occupation of the Netherlands itself, by Nazi Germany, in 1940. The KNIL was cut off from external Dutch assistance, except by Royal Netherlands Navy units. The KNIL, hastily and inadequately, attempted to transform into a modern military force able to protect the Dutch East Indies from foreign invasion. By December 1941, Dutch forces in Indonesia numbered around 85,000 personnel: regular troops consisted of about 1,000 officers and 34,000 enlisted soldiers, of whom 28,000 were indigenous. The remainder were made up of locally organised militia, territorial guard units and civilian auxiliaries. The KNIL air force, Militaire Luchtvaart KNIL (Royal Netherlands East Indies Air Force; ML-KNIL) numbered 389 planes of all types, but was largely outclassed by superior Japanese planes. The Royal Netherlands Navy Air Service, or MLD, also had significant forces in the NEI.

During the Dutch East Indies campaign of 1941–42, by forces of the Empire of Japan, most of the KNIL and other Allied forces were quickly defeated. Most European soldiers, which in practice included all able bodied Indo-European males, were interned by the Japanese as POWs. 25% of the POWs did not survive their internment.

A handful of soldiers, mostly indigenous personnel, mounted guerrilla campaigns against the Japanese. These were usually unknown to, and unassisted by, the Allies until the end of the war.

During early 1942, some KNIL personnel escaped to Australia. Some indigenous personnel were interned in Australia under suspicion of sympathies with the Japanese. The remainder began a long process of re-grouping. In late 1942, a failed attempt to land in East Timor, to reinforce Australian commandos waging a guerrilla campaign ended with the loss of 60 Dutch personnel.

Four "Netherlands East Indies" squadrons (the RAAF-NEI squadrons) were formed from ML-KNIL personnel, under the auspices of the Royal Australian Air Force, with Australian ground staff.

KNIL infantry forces (much like their counterparts in the UK), were augmented by recruitment among Dutch expatriates around the world and by colonial troops from as far away as the Dutch West Indies. During 1944–45, some small units saw action in the New Guinea campaign and Borneo campaign.

==== Camp Victory ====
Just north of Casino, New South Wales, a camp was established in 1942 for the KNIL. Originally a stock reserve, it was established by the 7th Australian Division when they returned from serving in the North Africa and before the transferred to fighting in the South West Pacific. The KNIL troops established workshops, canteens and training buildings, while most of the accommodation was in tents. The camp was renamed to Camp Victory, to show the intent on the recapture of the Dutch East Indies from Japanese Occupation.

Initially used by the 1st Infantry Battalion, this camp consisted of Surinamese and Dutch Antilles soldiers, evacuated infantry soldiers from Java and Ambon and a Technical Battalion. For a short period, a Papuan Battalion was raised and trained as infantry at Camp Victory for service in Western New Guinea. In 1944, aviation training commenced at Casino Airport with airman from newly liberated regions of the Netherlands. Upon the declaration of the Indonesian Republic, the Dutch soldiers in that battalion interned and imprisoned 500 of their Indonesian native comrades within the camp. Harsh treatment and penalties were issued out by the Dutch on any independence seeking soldiers. This led to the deaths of two KNIL native soldiers; one was a possible suicide and the other was a protest leader. This brought about condemnation from Australian locals, who forced the Australian authorities to repatriate all the imprisoned soldiers, despite being reluctant to heed earlier requests for assistance.

==== Camp Darley ====
Darley Camp had originally been established in the 1930s as an Australian Army training facility. By mid-1942, with growing numbers of Dutch evacuees arriving in Melbourne, the camp was made available to the Netherlands East Indies Army (KNIL) by the Australian military authorities. It became one of the key centres for hosting, rehabilitating, and training Dutch troops who had escaped from Java, Sumatra, Timor, and surrounding regions.

These included not only Dutch-born personnel but also Indo-European officers and enlisted men. Some had been evacuated by sea on KPM merchant ships; others had made hazardous escapes by air or smaller vessels. At Darley Camp, they received equipment, medical care, basic supplies, and updated training aligned with Allied operations.

It operated as a reception and transit facility for KNIL personnel evacuated from Southeast Asia. Also as an initial training site for Dutch troops, including drilling, tactics, and language familiarisation. There was a depot for clothing, medical inspection, and administrative reorganisation. After this, it acted as a point of reassignment for personnel to move across to units across Queensland and New South Wales, including those attached to Allied operations

==== Camp Columbia ====
This was a base at Wacol, Brisbane. It was built and served as the headquarters for the Sixth US Army and accommodation for American soldiers. As the war progressed further into the Pacific, it was transferred to the Netherlands East Indies Government In Exile. It housed the Netherlands Indies Civil Administration (NICA) and Netherlands East Indies Forces Intelligence Service (NEIFIS). It also served as the headquarters for KNIL forces within Australia. Women recruited into Royal Netherlands East Indies Army Corps (VK-KNIL) first served at Camp Columbia and trained at local hospitals before serving elsewhere in Australia and across the East Indies.

=== 1945–1950 ===
Following World War II, the KNIL was used in two large military campaigns in 1947 and 1948 to re-establish Dutch control of Indonesia. During the Indonesian War of Independence the KNIL trained the Dutch-born conscripts that arrived in the Dutch East Indies and made them familiar with the way that battles were fought in the colony. The KNIL and its Ambonese auxiliaries have been accused of committing war crimes during this "police action". Dutch efforts to re-establish their colony failed and Dutch recognition of Indonesian sovereignty came on 27 December 1949. On 26 January 1950, elements of the KNIL were involved in an abortive coup in Bandung planned by Raymond Westerling and Sultan Hamid II. The coup failed and only accelerated the dissolution of the federal Republic of the United States of Indonesia.

The KNIL was disbanded by 26 July 1950 with its indigenous personnel being given the option of demobilising or joining the newly formed Indonesian military. However, efforts to integrate former KNIL units were impeded by mutual distrust between the predominantly Ambonese KNIL troops and the Javanese-dominated Republican military, leading to clashes at Makassar in April and the attempted secession of an independent Republic of South Maluku (RMS) in July. These revolts were suppressed by November 1950 and approximately 12,500 Ambonese KNIL personnel and their families opted for temporary resettlement in the Netherlands. (Note: The complicated story of the disbanding of the KNIL is set out briefly here. For a more extended analysis see Manuhutu (1987); Steylen (1996: 33–63); van Amersfoort (1982: 101–108). The psychological impact of the dissolution of the KNIL on the Ambonese servicemen is described in Wittermans (1991).) Following this, the KNIL ceased to exist but its traditions are maintained by the Regiment Van Heutsz of the modern Royal Netherlands Army. At the time of disbandment the KNIL numbered 65,000, of whom 26,000 were incorporated into the new Indonesian Army and should be received with the same rank. It is estimated that around 39,000 of the remaining KNIL troops who majority of whom came from Ambon, took the option of retiring or joining the Royal Dutch Armed Forces and serving in Papua or Suriname. Some of them were involved in the Dutch contingent in Korean War (1950–1953).

== Recruiting ==
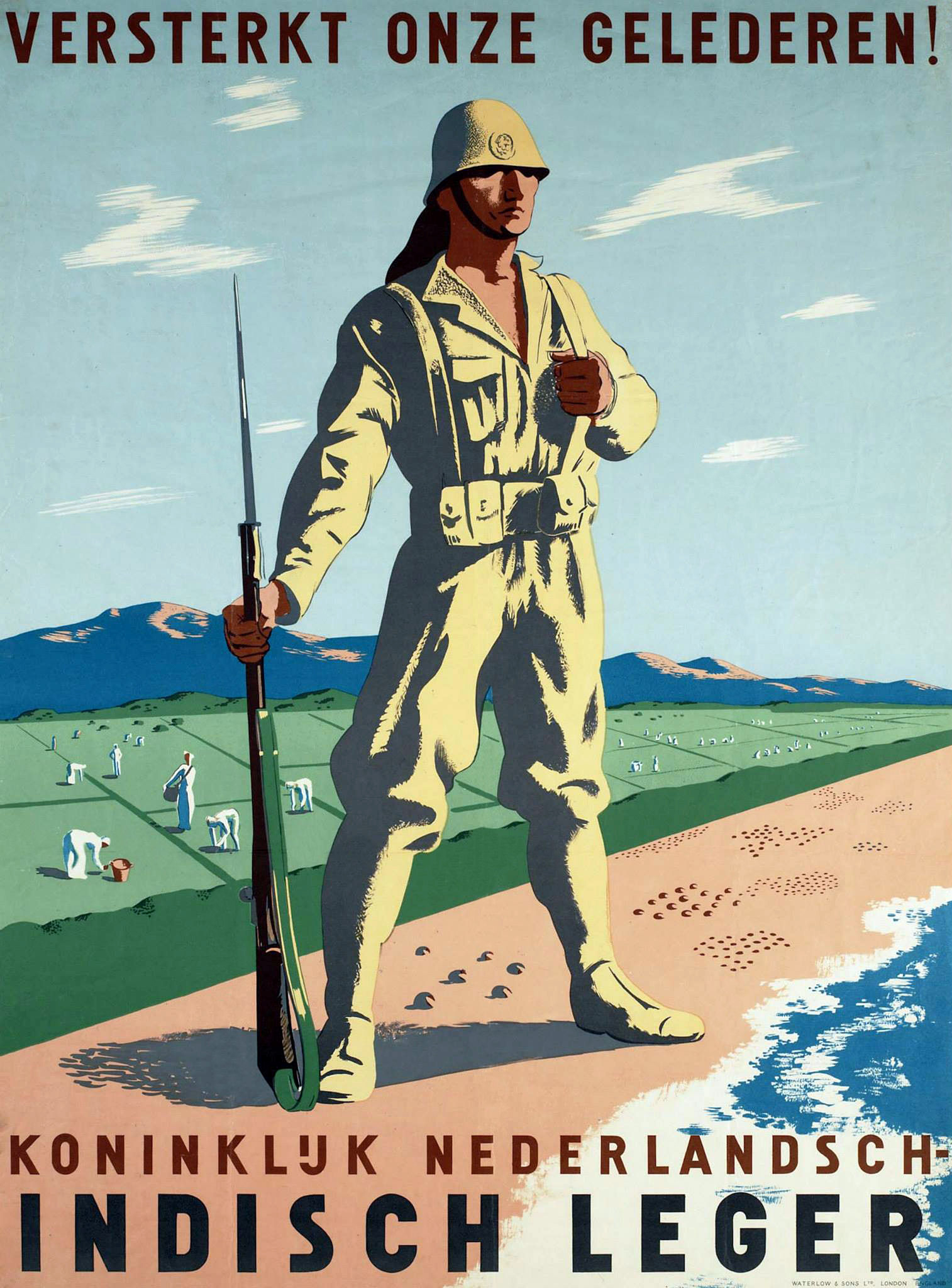
Recruitment poster – Versterkt onze gelederen! (1944)

During its formation, it was stated that the KNIL would include both European and indigenous soldiers. In the beginning the KNIL was equally divided, which meant that half the army consisted of European soldiers, while the other half was made up of indigenous soldiers. However, starting from the late 1830s the ratio between European soldiers and indigenous soldiers went from 1:1 to 1:3. The reason for this was that there were not enough European volunteers to keep up with the recruitment of indigenous soldiers. Besides European volunteers and indigenous recruits the KNIL also recruited foreign mercenaries of several nationalities during the 19th century. During the protracted Aceh War the numbers of European troops were kept to 12,000 but continued Achenese resistance necessitated the deployment of up to 23,000 indigenous soldiers (mainly from Java, Ambon, and Manado). Even slaves of the Ashanti (Ivory Coast and Ghana) were recruited in limited numbers for service in the East Indies (see Belanda Hitam). The ratio of foreign and indigenous troops to those of Dutch origin was reported to be 60% to 40%. After the Aceh War, the enlistment of non-Dutch European troops ceased and the KNIL came to consist of Dutch regulars recruited in the Netherlands itself, Indonesians, Indos (Eurasians), and Dutch colonists living in the East Indies and undertaking their military service.

In 1884 personnel strength was numbered at 13,492 European, 14,982 Indonesian, 96 African (though some sources put the number of Africans much higher) and at least 1,666 Eurasian recruits. The officer corps was wholly European and was probably close to 1,300. There were also about 1,300 horses. Recruitment was carried out in the Netherlands and Indonesia, with over 1,000 Dutch subjects and 500 foreigners enlisting annually. The foreign troops consisted of Flemish, German, Swiss, and French volunteers. Walloons, Arabs, and nationals of both the United Kingdom and United States were forbidden from serving. Other foreigners who could not prove fluency in either Dutch or German were also not accepted for service.

It was against the law to send Dutch conscripts from the Netherlands to the East Indies but Dutch volunteers continued to enlist for colonial service in the KNIL. In 1890 a Colonial Reserve Corps (Koloniale Reserve) was established in the Netherlands itself to recruit and train these volunteers and to re-integrate them into Dutch society upon the conclusion of their overseas service. On the eve of the Japanese invasion in December 1941, Dutch regular troops in the East Indies consisted of about 1,000 officers and 34,000 men, of whom 28,000 were indigenous. The largest proportion of these "native troops" had always consisted of Javanese and Sundanese soldiers. (Note: Javanese was always the largest indigenous element of the colonial army.) (Note: The KNIL statistics of 1939 show at least 13,500 Javanese and Sundanese under arms compared to 4,000 Ambonese soldiers.) During the Japanese occupation, most of the Dutch and Ambonese personnel were interned in POW camps.

During the Indonesian National Revolution, the KNIL's officers were still largely Dutch and Eurasians although most of its troops were recruited from predominantly Indonesian Christian ethnicities, particularly Batak, Moluccas, Timor and Manado. Although there were larger numbers of Javanese, Sundanese, Madurese, Bantenese, Sumatran and other Muslim troops in Dutch service, these received comparatively lower rates of pay than their Christian counterparts, leading to resentment and distrust. The Dutch sought to take advantage of these ethnic tensions by claiming that the Ambonese would lose their special privileges and pensions under a Javanese-dominated government. As noted above, these factors contributed to clashes between demobilised KNIL units and the Republic of Indonesia's military throughout 1950.

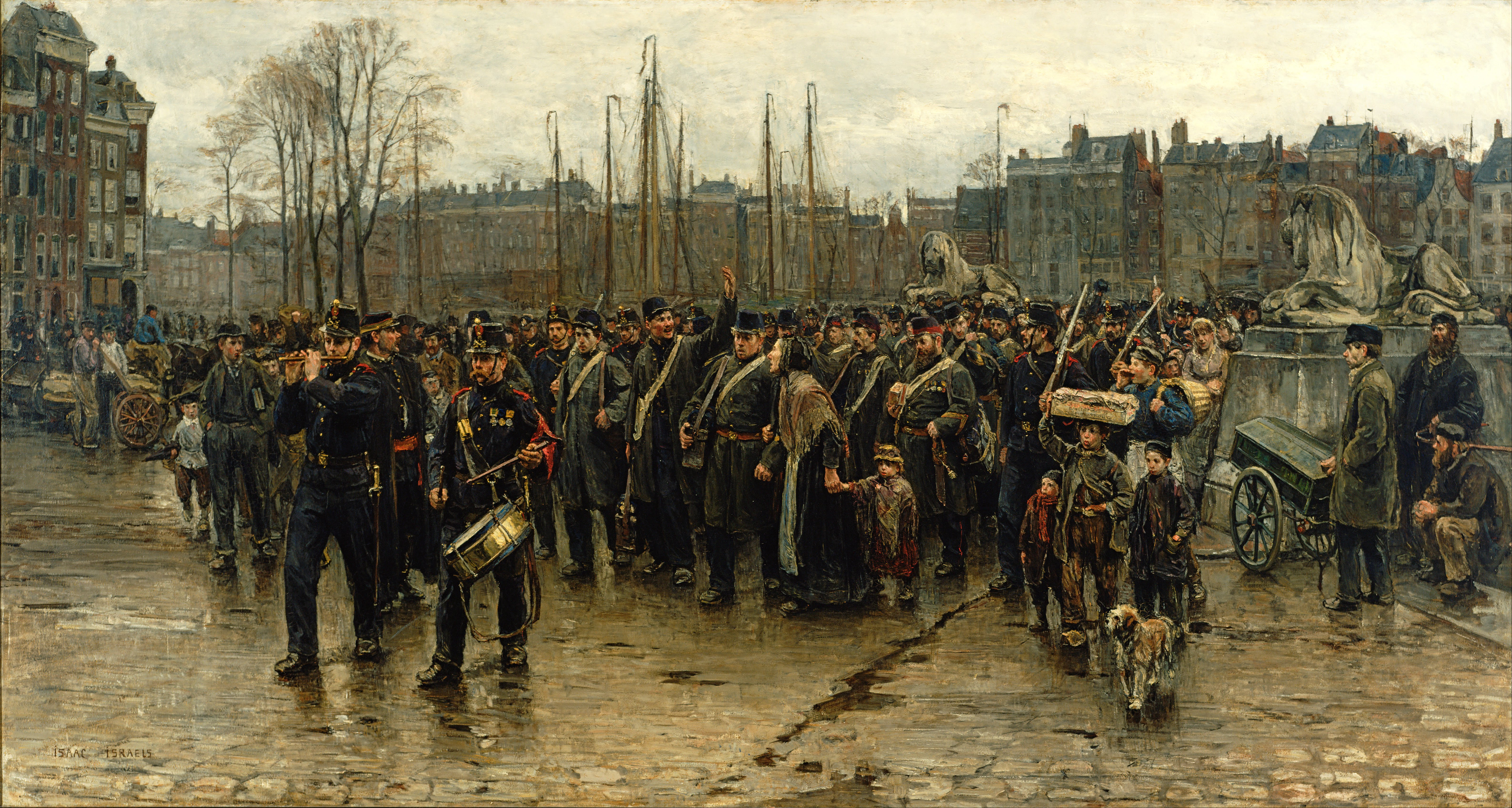
Isaac Israëls, Het transport der kolonialen (Transport of the Colonial Soldiers), showing recruits for the Royal Netherlands East Indies Army marching through Rotterdam to their transport to the Dutch East Indies

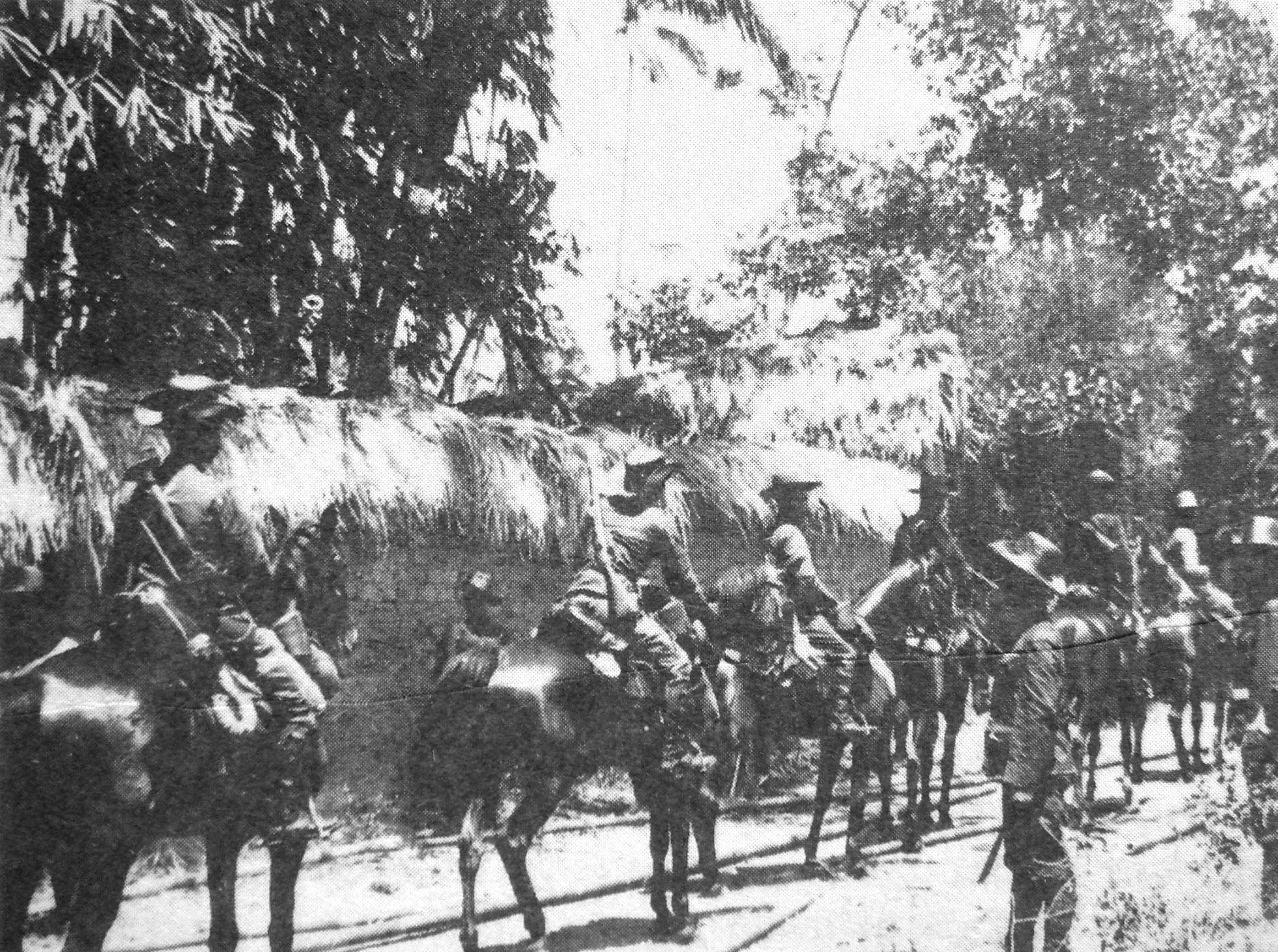
Cavalry of the Royal Dutch East Indies Army in 1906 during the Dutch intervention in Bali (1906)

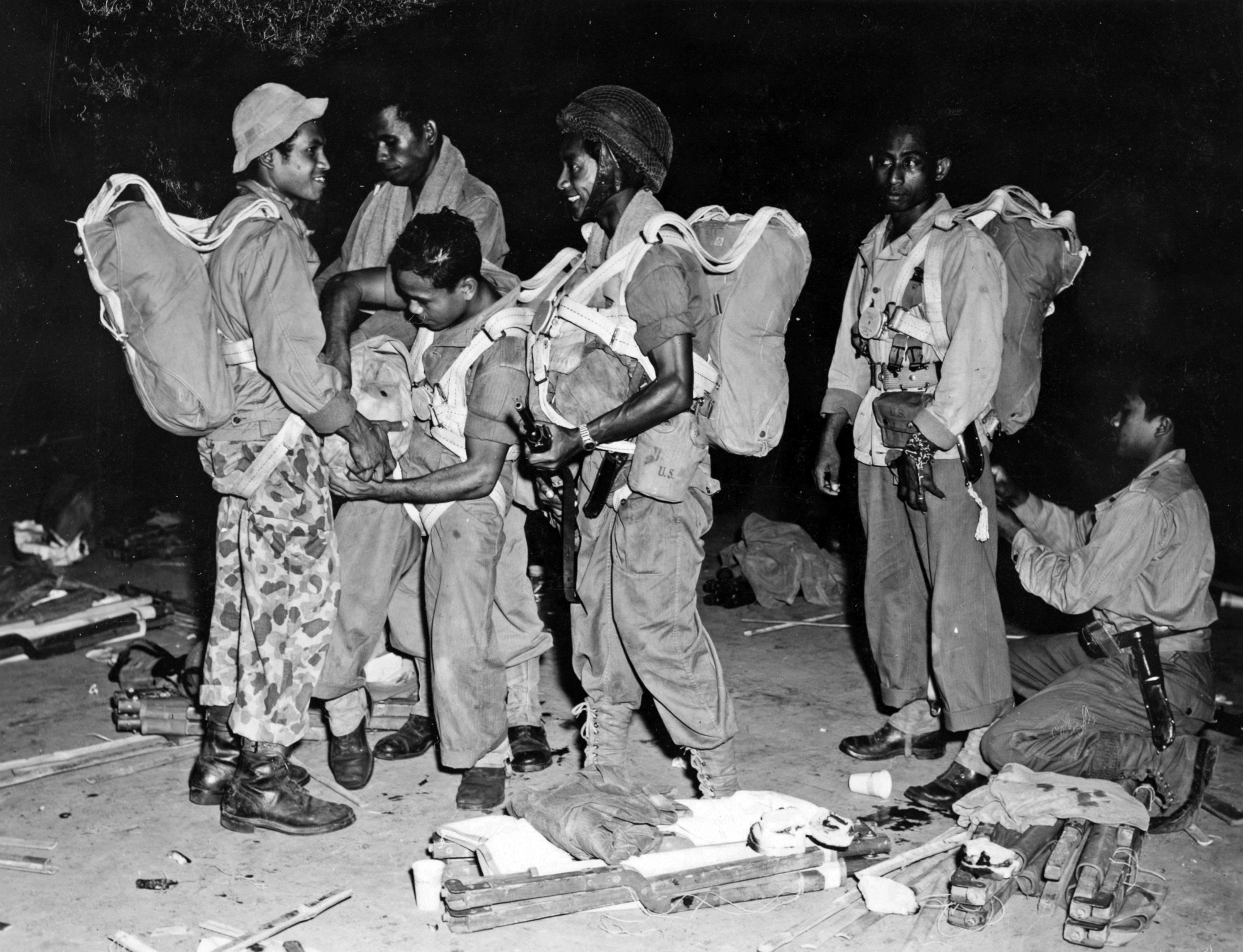
Paratroopers are being prepared for an action (1948)

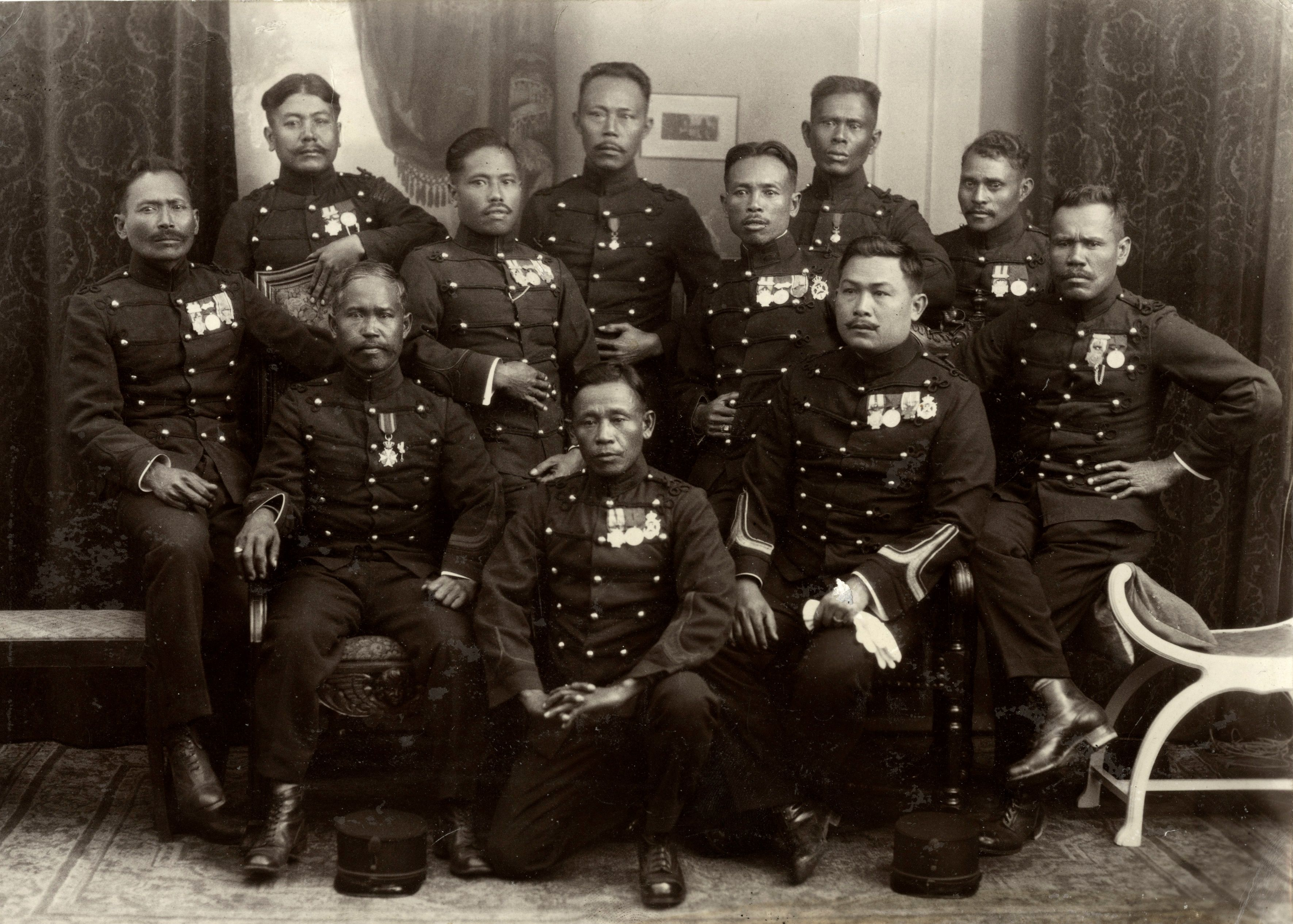
Decorated indigenous KNIL soldiers, 1927

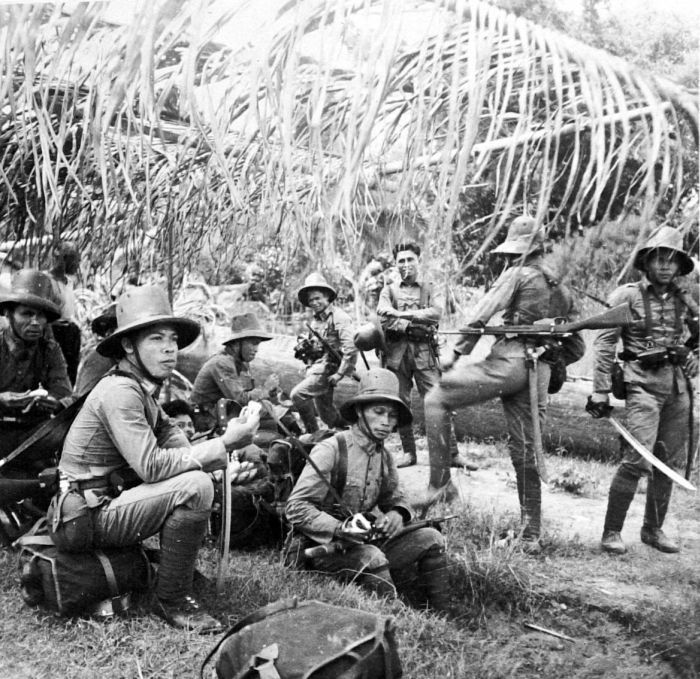
Indigenous KNIL troops, 1938

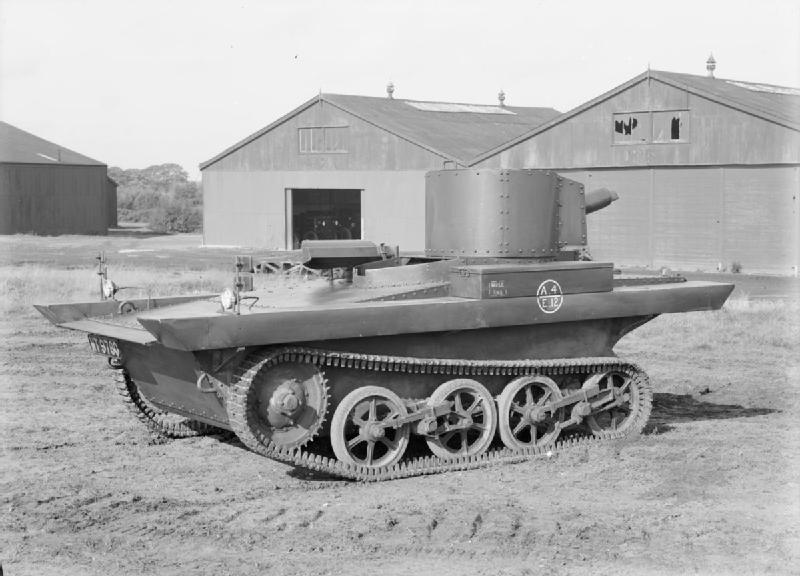
The Vickers light amphibious tank was used by Dutch forces in the East Indies.

== Ranks ==
Officers

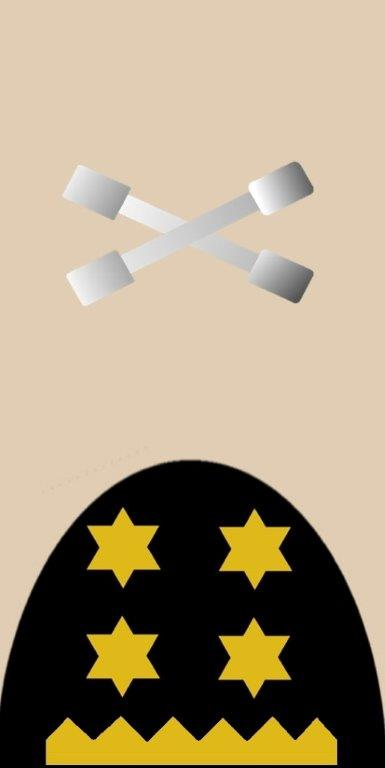
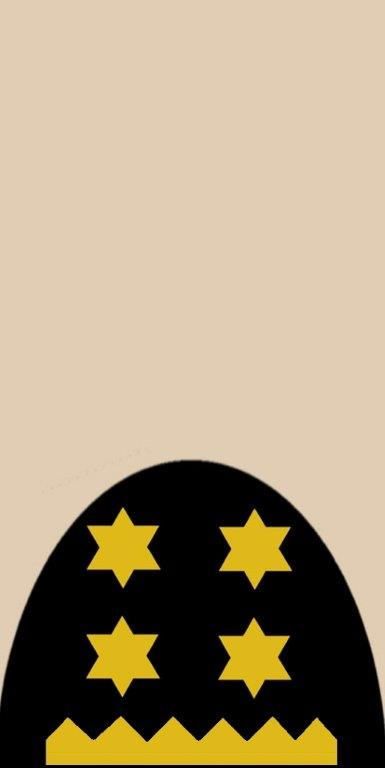
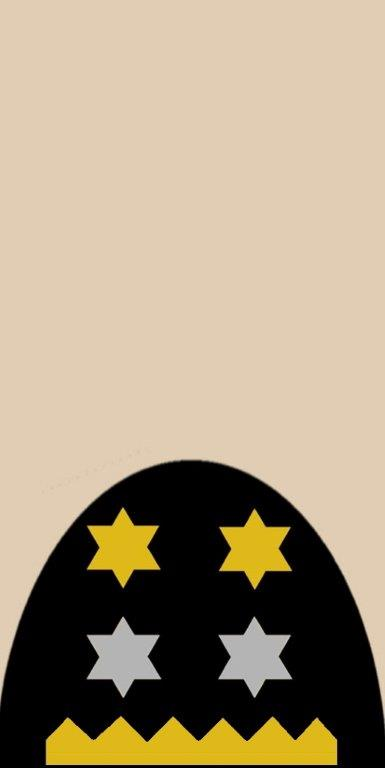
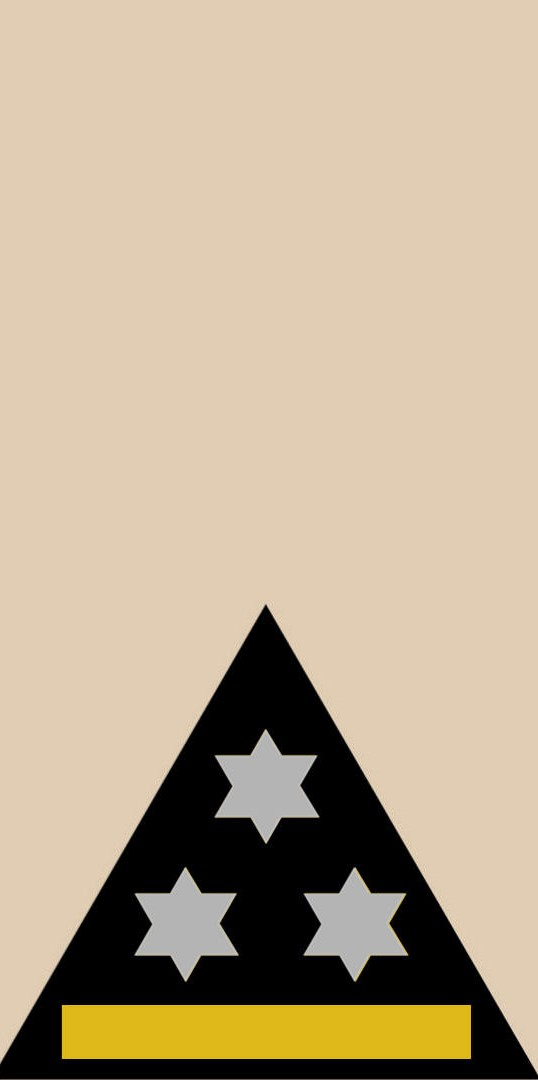
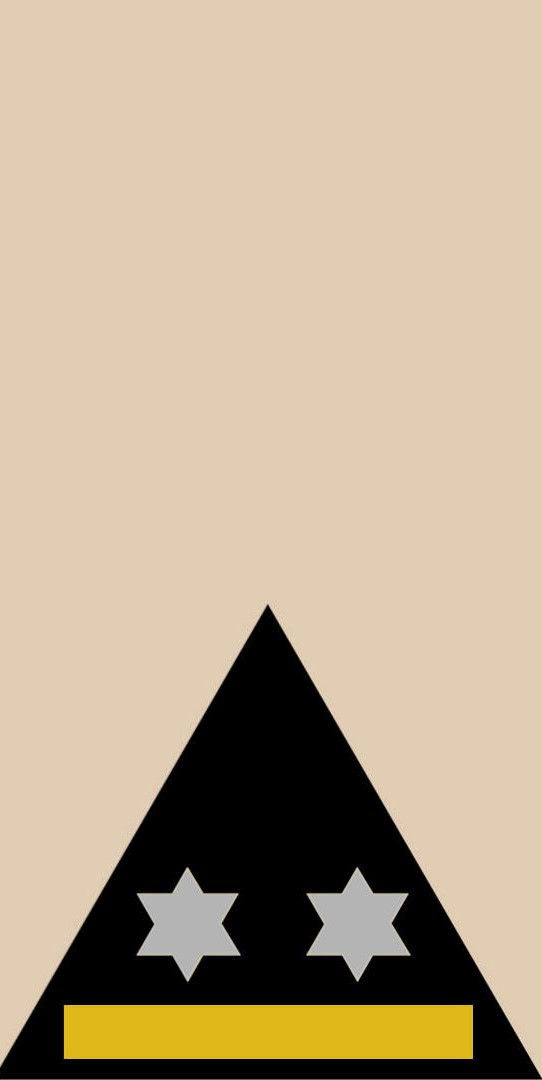
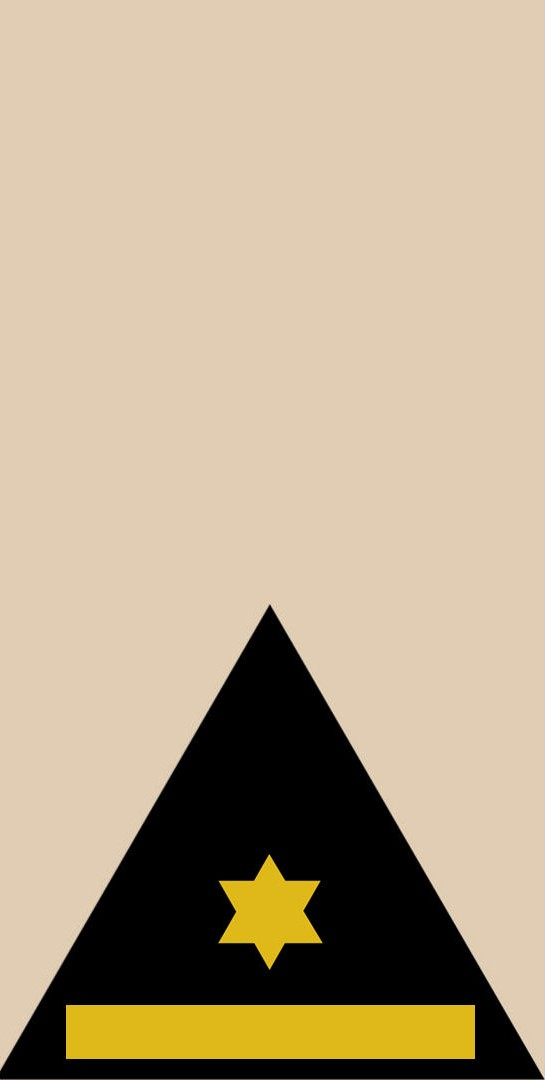
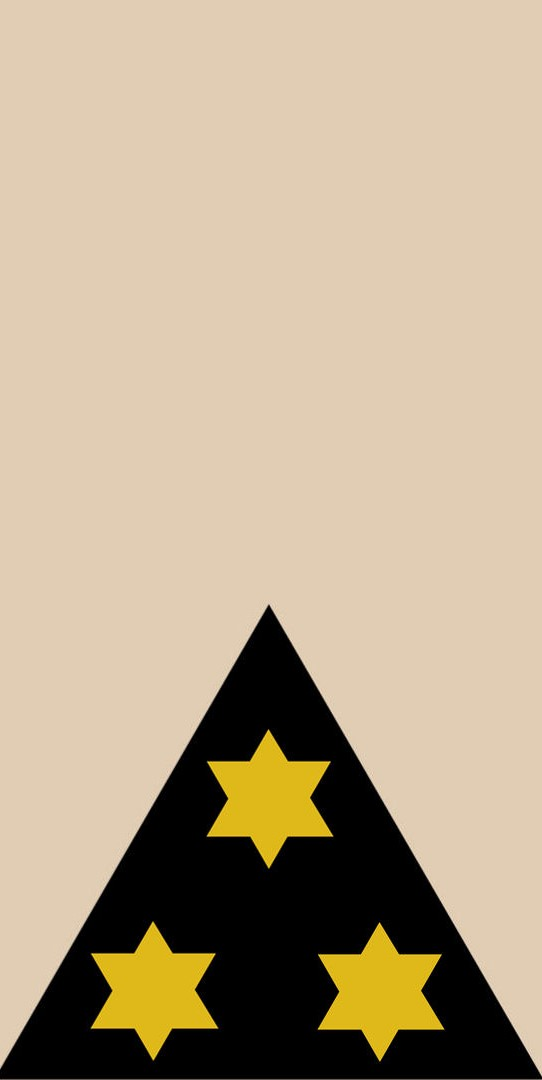
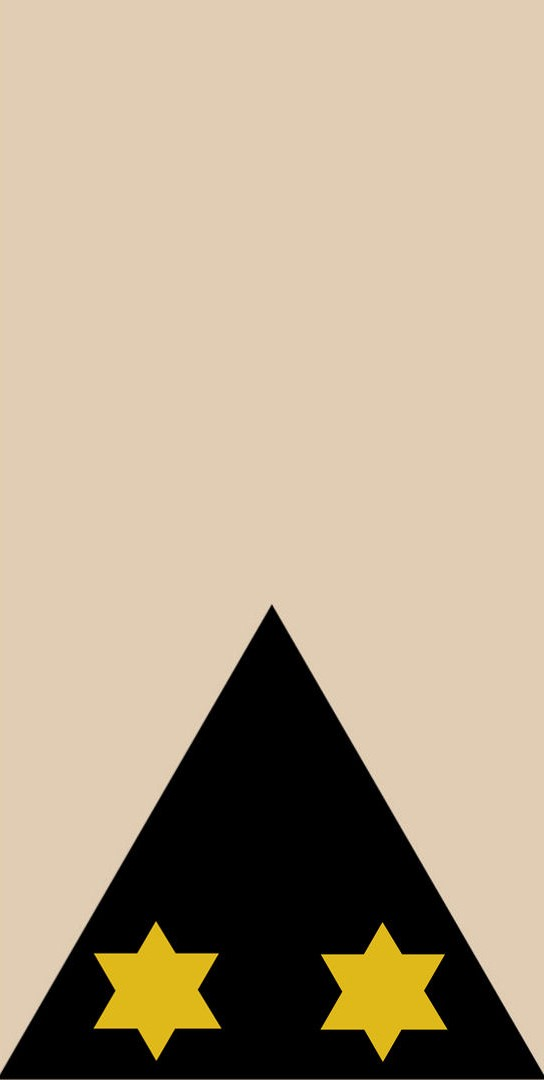
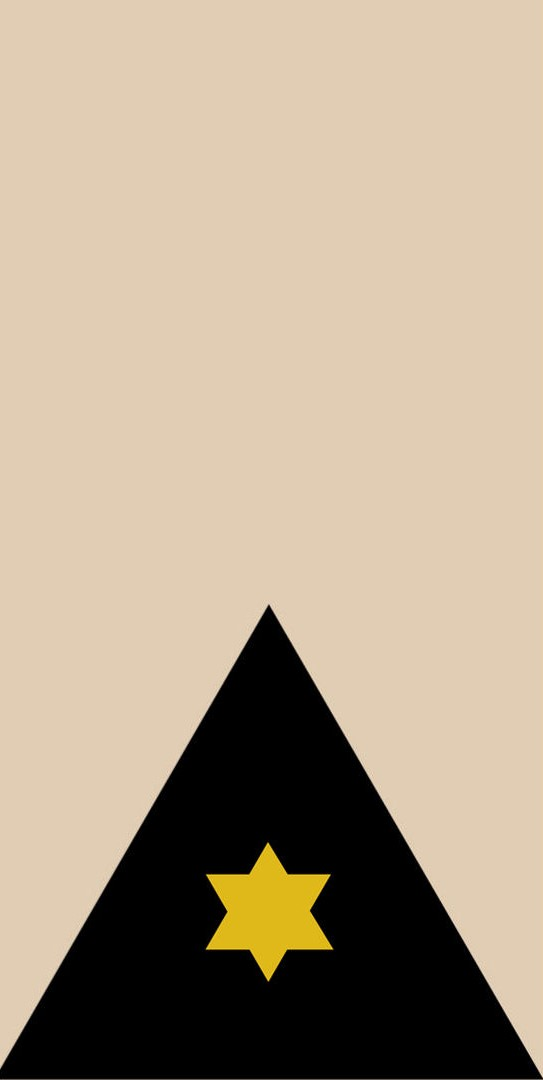
Rank group	General / flag officers			Senior officers			Junior officers
Royal Netherlands East Indies Army (1942–1950)
Royal Netherlands East Indies Army (1942–1950)	Generaal	Luitenant-generaal	Generaal-majoor	Kolonel	Luitenant-kolonel	Majoor	Kapitein	1e Luitenant	2e Luitenant

Others

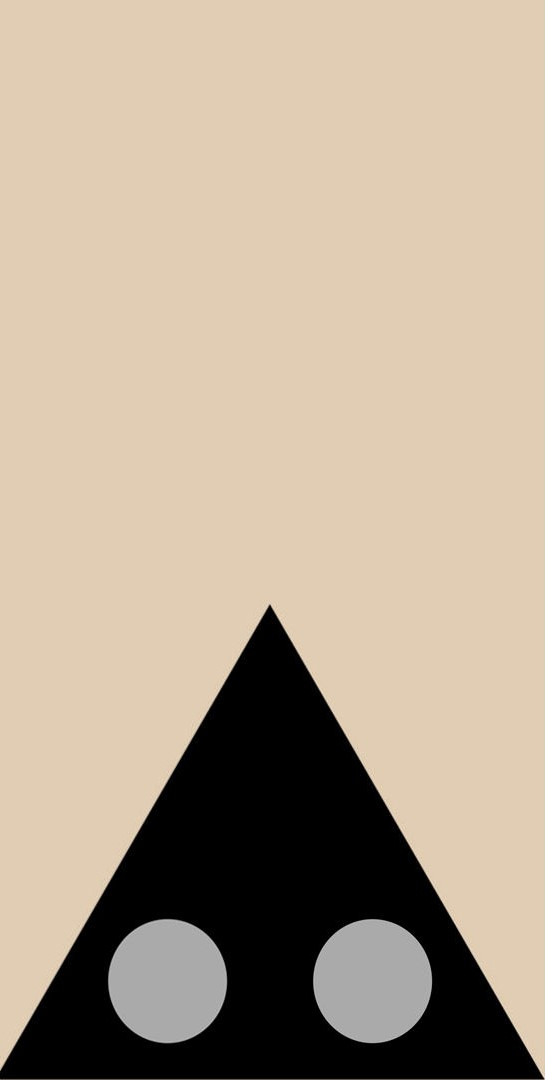
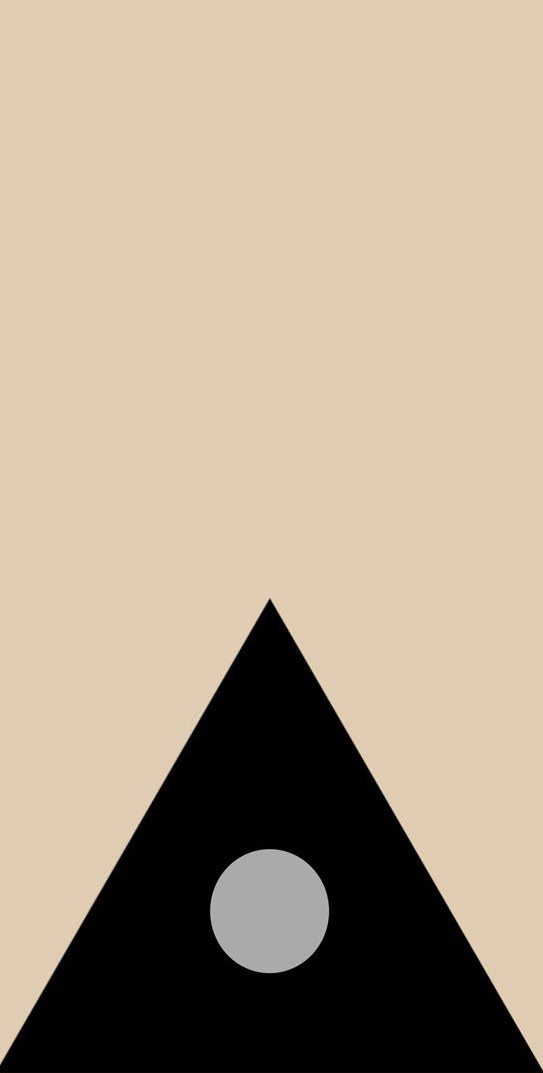
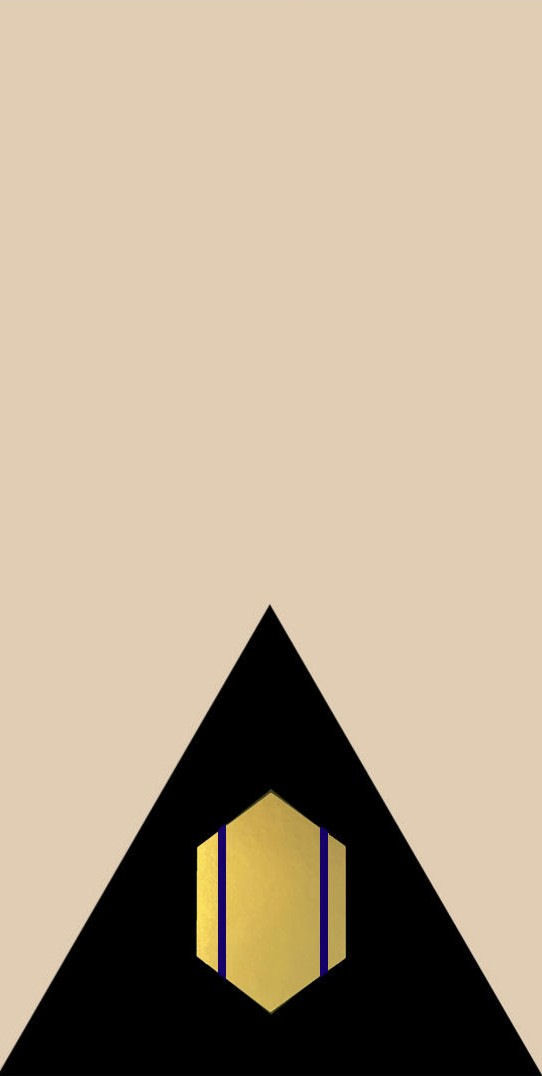
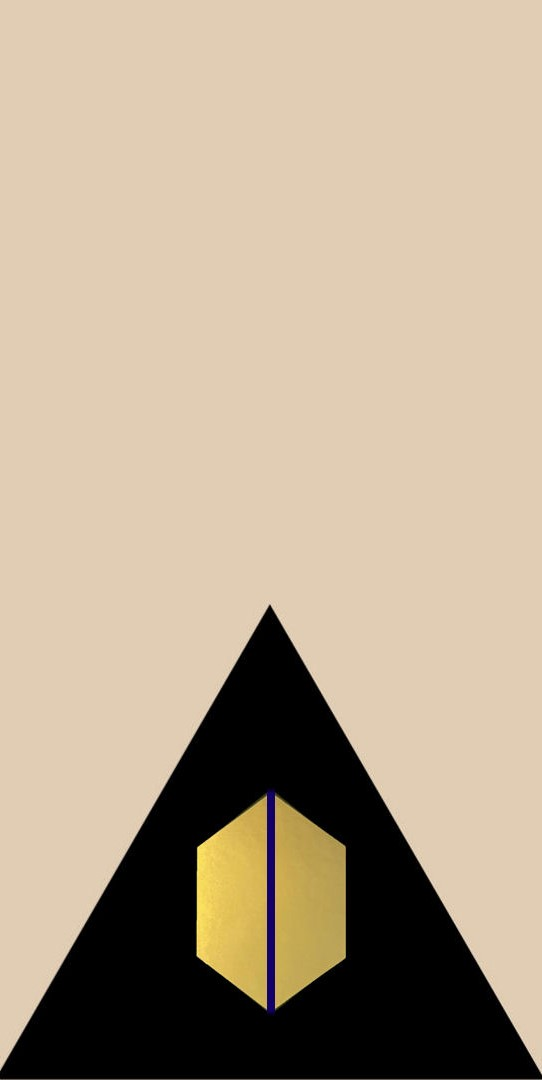
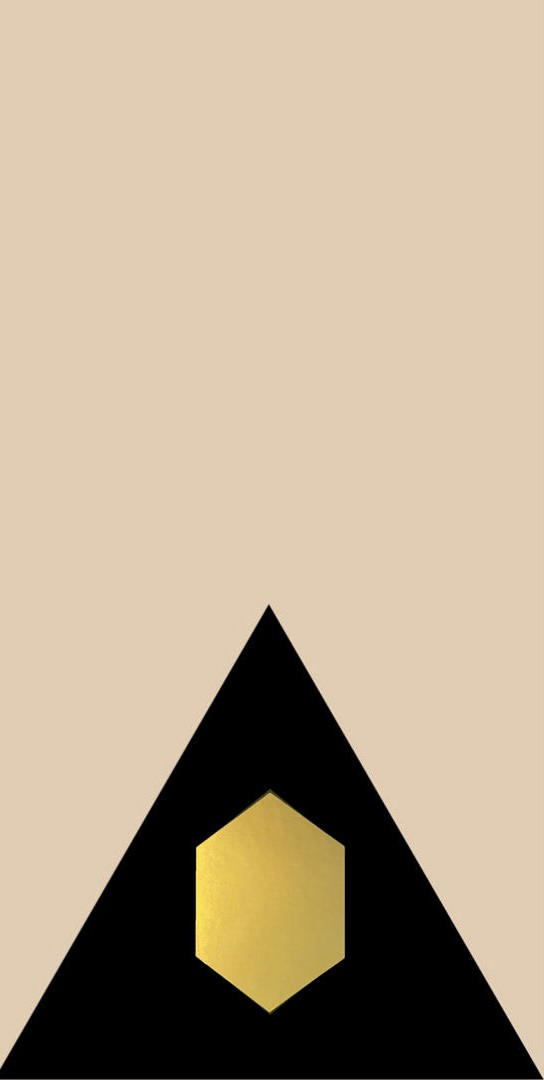
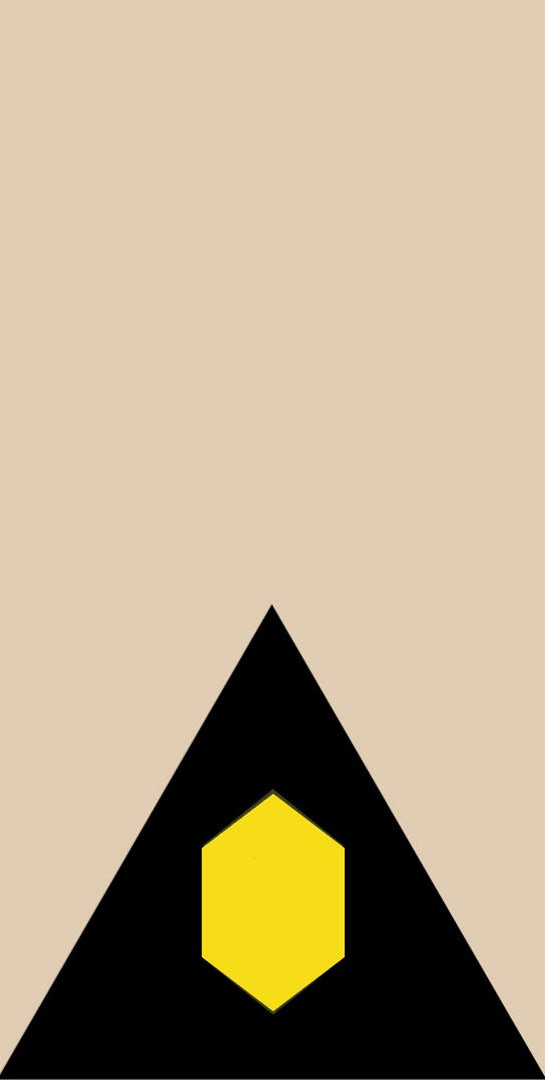
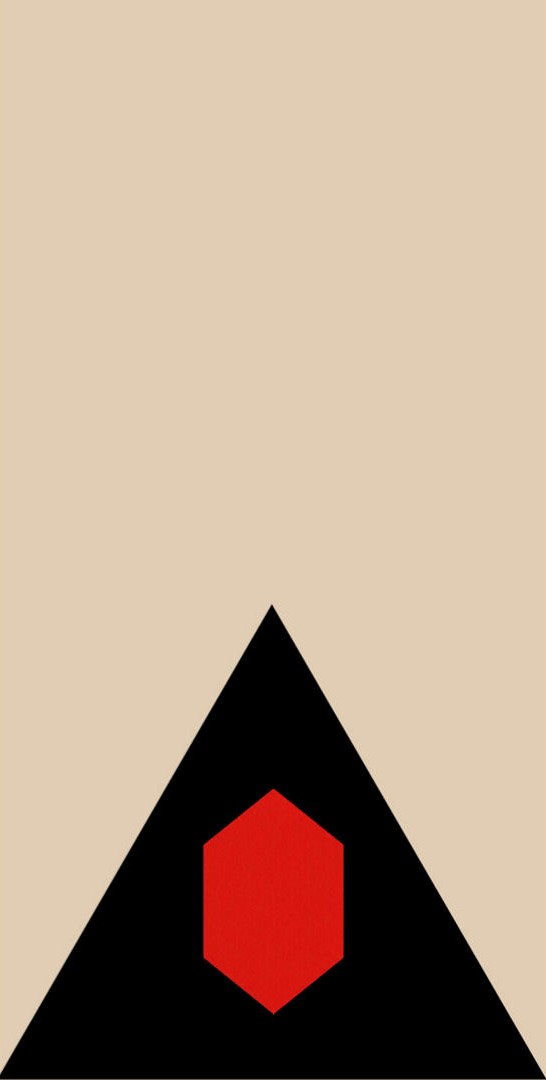
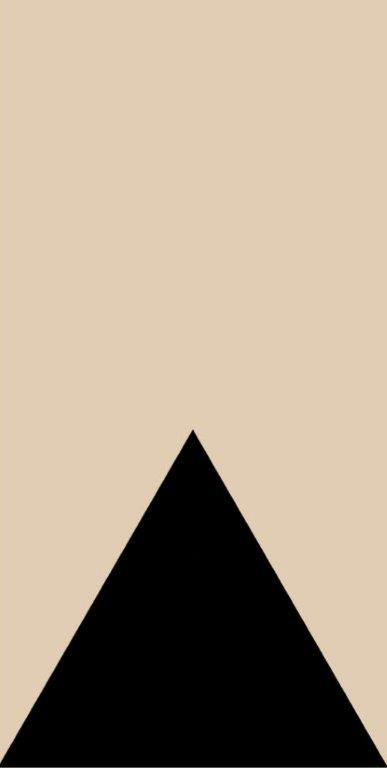
Rank group	Senior NCOs					Junior NCOs	Enlisted
Royal Netherlands East Indies Army (1942–1950)
Royal Netherlands East Indies Army (1942–1950)	Onderluitenant	Adjudant	Sergeant majoor	Sergeant	Sergeant der 2e Klass	Korporaal	1e Soldaat	Soldaat

== Commanders ==
- 1815–1819 General-major Carl Heinrich Wilhelm Anthing
- 1819–1822 General-major Hendrik Merkus de Kock
- 1822–1828 General-major Josephus Jacobus van Geen
- 1829–1830 General-major Hendrik Merkus de Kock
- 1830–1835 Luitenant-generaal Hubert de Stuers
- 1835–1847 General-major Frans David Cochius
- 1847–1849 General-major Carel van der Wijck
- 1849–1849 Luitenant-generaal Andreas Victor Michiels
- 1849–1851 Luitenant-generaal Bernhard of Saxe-Weimar-Eisenach
- 1851–1854 General-major Gerhardus Bakker
- 1854–1858 Luitenant-generaal François de Stuers
- 1858–1862 Luitenant-generaal Jan van Swieten
- 1862–1865 Luitenant-generaal Charles Pierre Schimpf
- 1865–1869 Luitenant-generaal Augustus Johannes Andresen
- 1869–1873 Luitenant-generaal Willem Egbert Kroesen
- 1873–1875 Luitenant-generaal Nicolaus Whitton
- 1875–1879 Luitenant-generaal Gillis Pieter de Neve
- 1879–1883 Luitenant-generaal Huibert Gerard Boumeester
- 1883–1887 Luitenant-generaal Karel Lodewijk Pfeiffer
- 1887–1889 Luitenant-generaal Anthonie Haga
- 1889–1893 Luitenant-generaal Theodoor Johan Arnold van Zijll de Jong
- 1893–1895 Luitenant-generaal Adriaan Gey van Pittius
- 1895–1897 Luitenant-generaal Jacobus Augustinus Vetter
- 1897–1900 Luitenant-generaal Lammert Swart

== See also ==
- Royal Netherlands East Indies Army Women's Corps (VK-KNIL) — women's branch of the KNIL, 1944–1950
- British Indian Army — having a similar function in British India
- Military Mission for Indonesia — Dutch instruction and advisory group staffed by many ex-KNIL personnel
