= Netherlands Indies Civil Administration =

1944–1947 semi-military organisation in the Dutch East Indies

- Nederlandsch-Indische Civiele Administratie
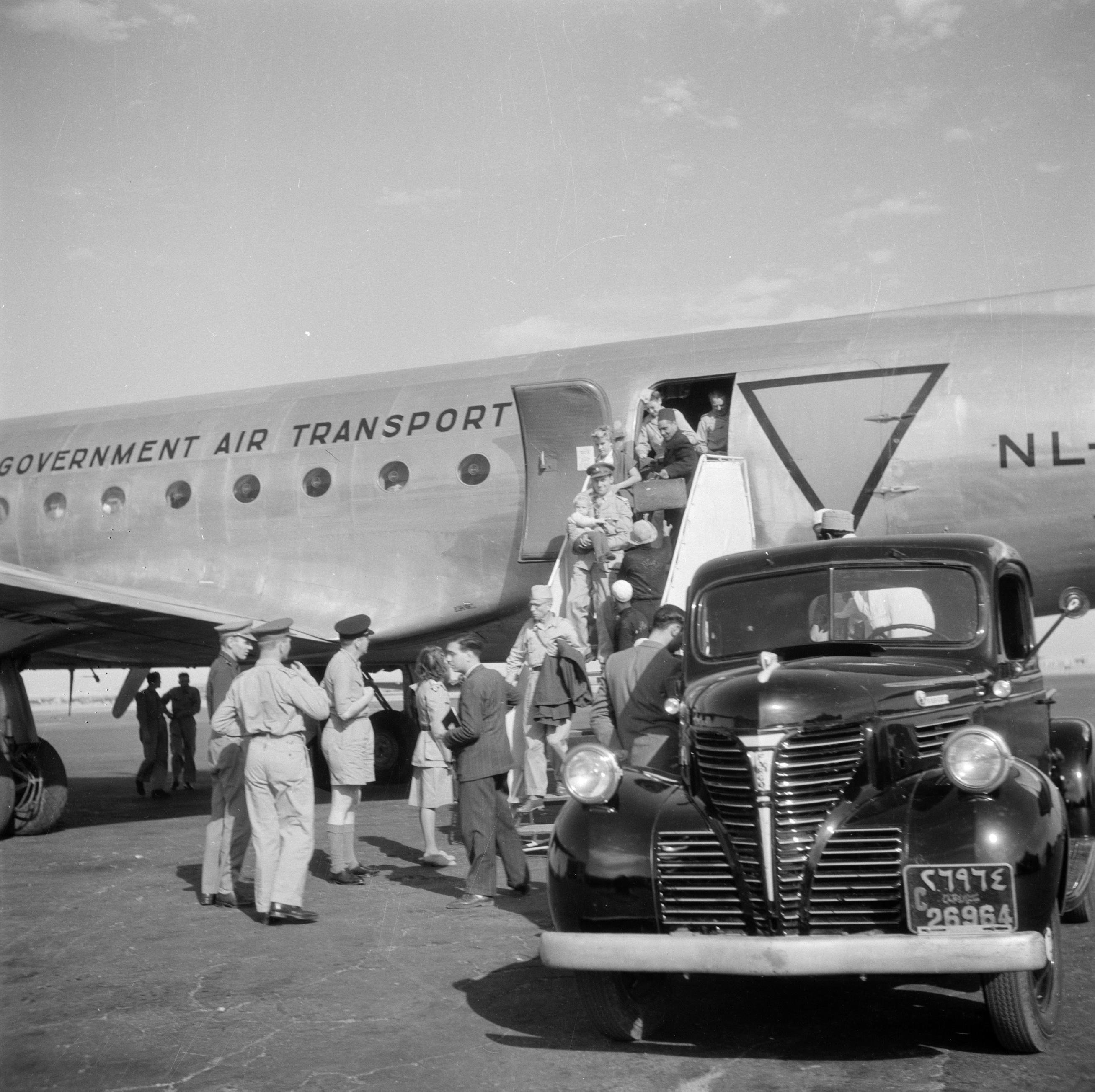
- Arrival of NICA personnel at Kemayoran Airport in Batavia, November 1945
- Leaders: Hubertus Johannes van Mook; Raden Abdulkadir Widjojoatmodjo
- Dates active: 1944–1947
- Allegiance: Netherlands; Dutch East Indies
- Active regions: Indonesian Archipelago
- Status: Semi-military

The Netherlands Indies Civil Administration (Dutch: Nederlandsch-Indische Civiele Administratie, NICA) was a semi-military organisation, established in April 1944, tasked with the restoration of civil administration and law of Dutch colonial rule after the capitulation of the Japanese occupational forces in the Dutch East Indies (present-day Indonesia) at the end of World War II.

In January 1946, its name was changed to the Allied Military Administration–Civil Affairs Branch (AMACAB). After the disengagement of the British South East Asia Command (SEAC) from the Indonesian Archipelago, the organization was renamed as the Temporary Administrative Service (Dutch: Tijdelijke Bestuursdienst, TB) in June 1946.

== Foundation ==
The NICA was established on 3 April 1944 in Australia and operated as a link between the Netherlands East Indies government-in-exile in Melbourne and the Allied high command in the South West Pacific Area (SWPA). Based at Camp Columbia in Brisbane, it originally reported into the Allied command structure. In early 1944, Dutch Lieutenant Governor-General Hubertus van Mook and US General Douglas MacArthur, supreme commander of the SWPA, agreed that territory of the Dutch East Indies recaptured by Allied troops was to be transferred to the civil administration of the NICA. Due to political procrastination by the United States Department of State, it was 10 December 1944 before the Van Mook–MacArthur Civil Affairs Agreement was officially signed.

== Early activity ==
Still in April 1944, the first NICA detachments went ashore at Hollandia (present-day Jayapura) in Western New Guinea, during the Battle of Hollandia. NICA staff consisted of Dutch totoks, Indos, and native Indonesian military or militarized personnel that wore uniforms. The general management was in the hands of Colonel Conrad Giebel, who had the rank of Staff Officer NICA (SONICA). Each detachment was headed by a Commanding Officer NICA (CONICA) responsible for local governance. Before the capitulation of Japan, NICA units already established civil administration in Western New Guinea (i.e. at Hollandia, Manokwari, and on the Schouten Islands), in the Moluccas (on Morotai), and in Borneo (on Tarakan and at Balikpapan).

US support and supplies to the NICA virtually ended when it became clear that after 15 August 1945, military command was transferred from the American SWPA to the British South East Asia Command (SEAC). The 250 NICA detachments planned for deployment to Java were halted. The reoccupation of Sumatra, Java, Bali, and Lombok became a British responsibility, while the rest of the archipelago became an Australian responsibility. On 24 August, the Dutch signed the new Anglo–Dutch Civil Affairs Agreement with Lord Mountbatten, supreme commander of the SEAC.

In September 1945, the first NICA representatives set foot in Batavia (present-day Jakarta). In response to the strong, averse reaction of the Indonesian revolutionaries to the arrival of the NICA and the inclusion of the colonial term 'Netherlands Indies' in its name, it was renamed in January 1946 to the Allied Military Administration–Civil Affairs Branch (AMACAB), without a Dutch translation. After the departure of British and Australian forces from the Indonesian Archipelago, its name was changed into the Temporary Administrative Service (Tijdelijke Bestuursdienst, TB) in June 1946.

== Commanders ==
NICA's highest commander was the Dutch totok Acting Lieutenant Governor-General Hubertus Johannes van Mook (Semarang, 1894 – L'Isle-sur-la-Sorgue, 1965). His most senior adviser (in 1944) and second in command (by 1947) was the Javanese nobleman Raden Abdulkadir Widjojoatmodjo (Salatiga, 1904 - The Hague, 1992), a graduate from Leiden University and a protégé of Professor Christiaan Snouck Hurgronje. Before the war, he was a senior diplomat in both Jeddah and Mecca. In his roles for NICA he was also appointed colonel in the Royal Netherlands East Indies Army (Koninklijk Nederlands Indisch Leger, KNIL) and the resident of the Moluccas. In 1947, Widjojoatmodjo served as the Government Commissioner for Administrative Affairs for the State of Pasundan and as Director-General of General Negotiation Affairs of the Kingdom of the Netherlands with the Republic of Indonesia.

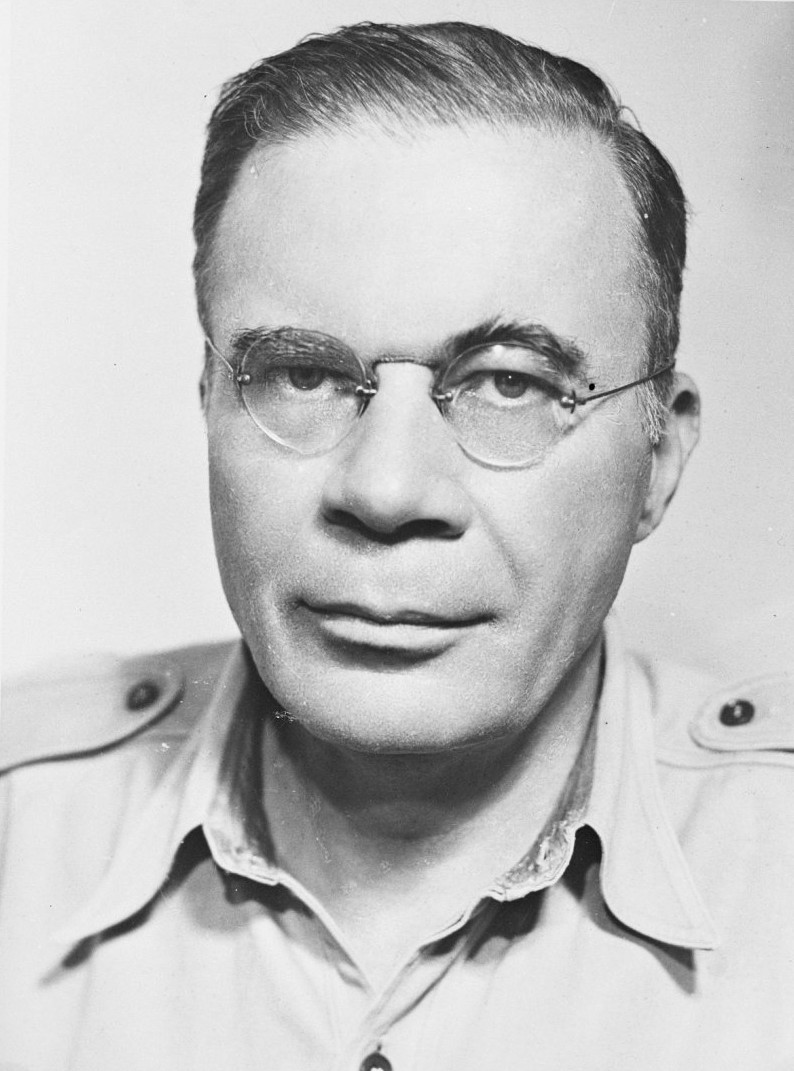
Hubertus Johannes van Mook

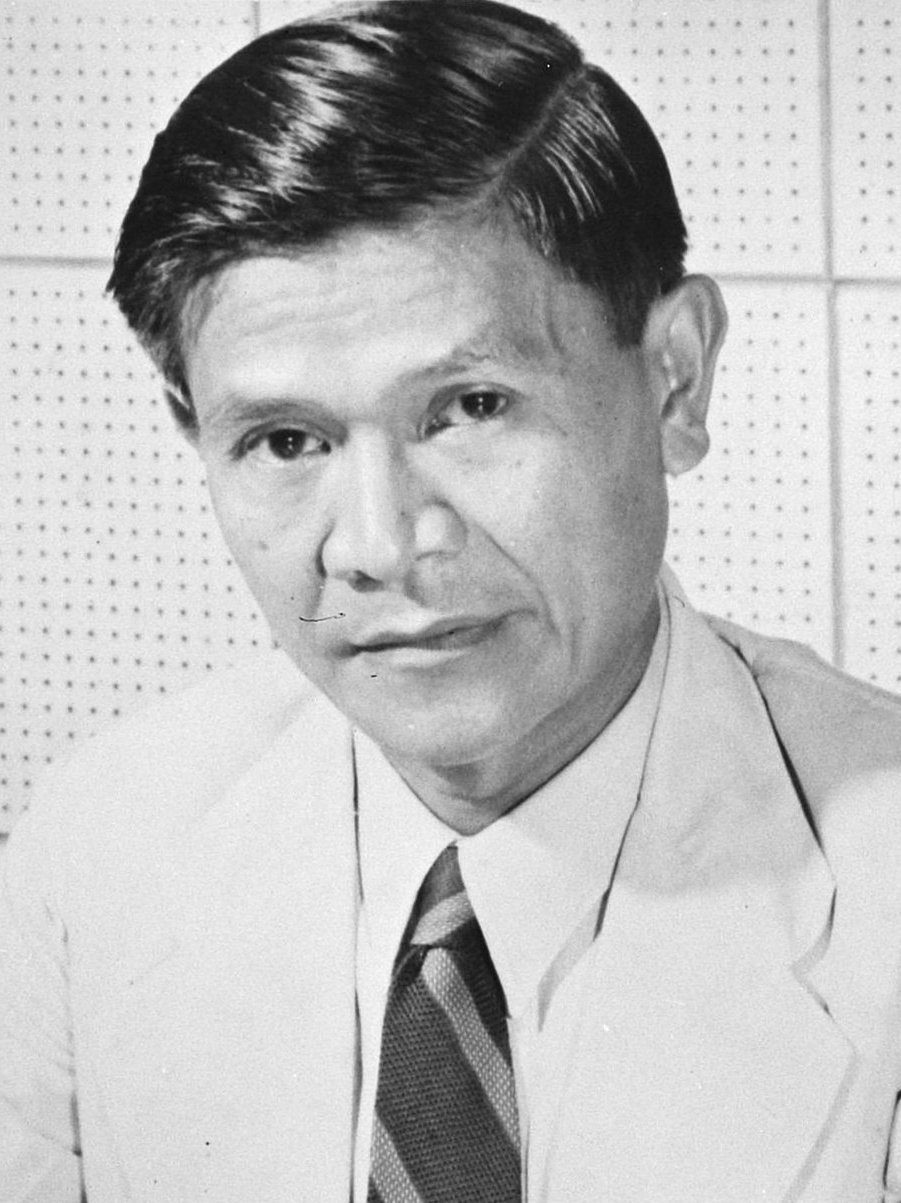
Raden Abdulkadir Widjojoatmodjo

== See also ==
- Dutch colonial empire
- Van Mook–MacArthur Civil Affairs Agreement (1944)
- Anglo–Dutch Civil Affairs Agreement (1945)
