= Klungkung Regency =

Regency in Bali, Indonesia

Klungkung Regency Kabupaten Klungkung
- Regency

Native transcription(s)
  - Balinese: ᬓᬩᬸᬧᬢᬾᬦ᭄ᬓ᭄ᬮᬸᬂᬓᬸᬂ Kabupatén Klungkung
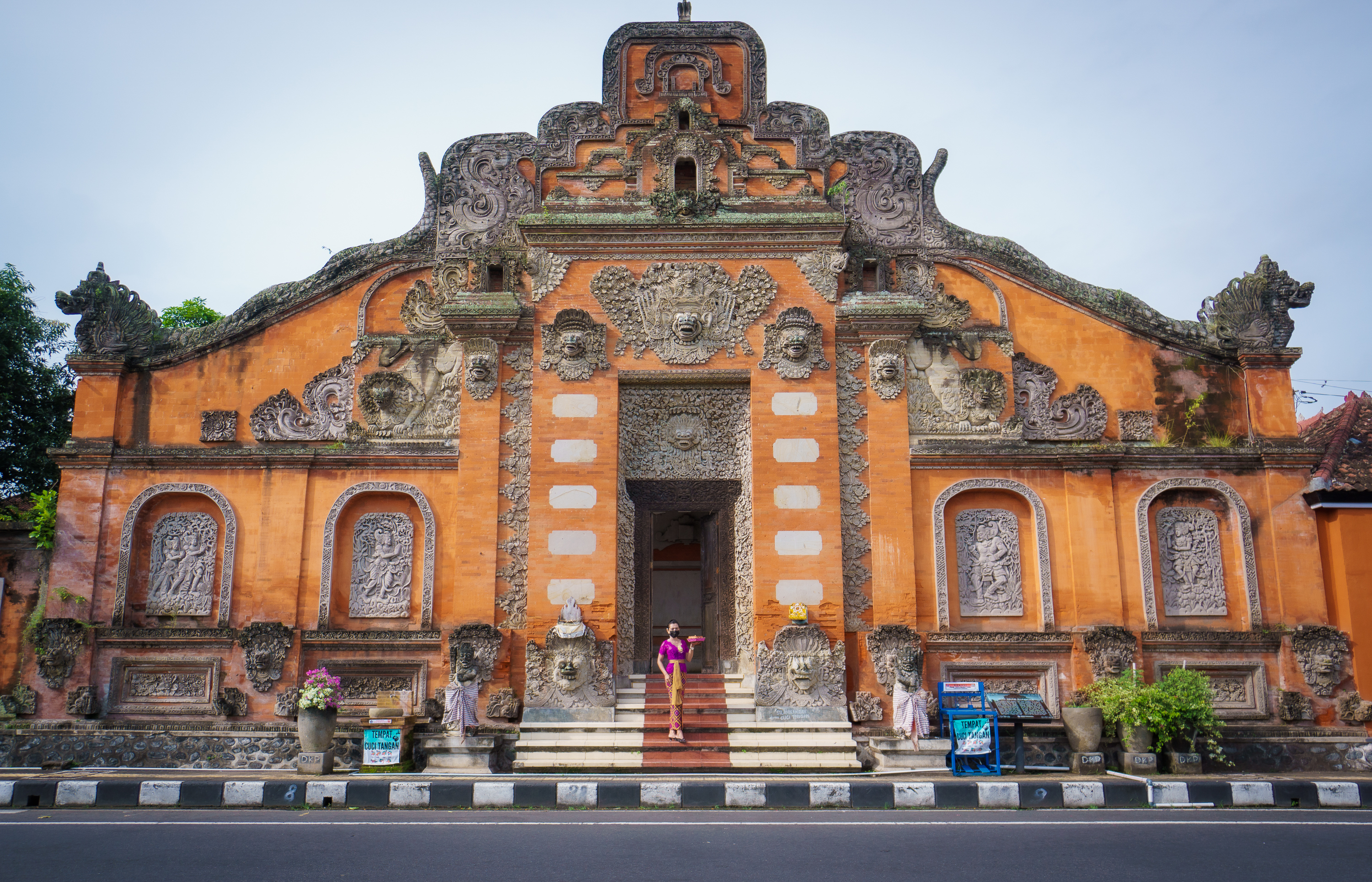
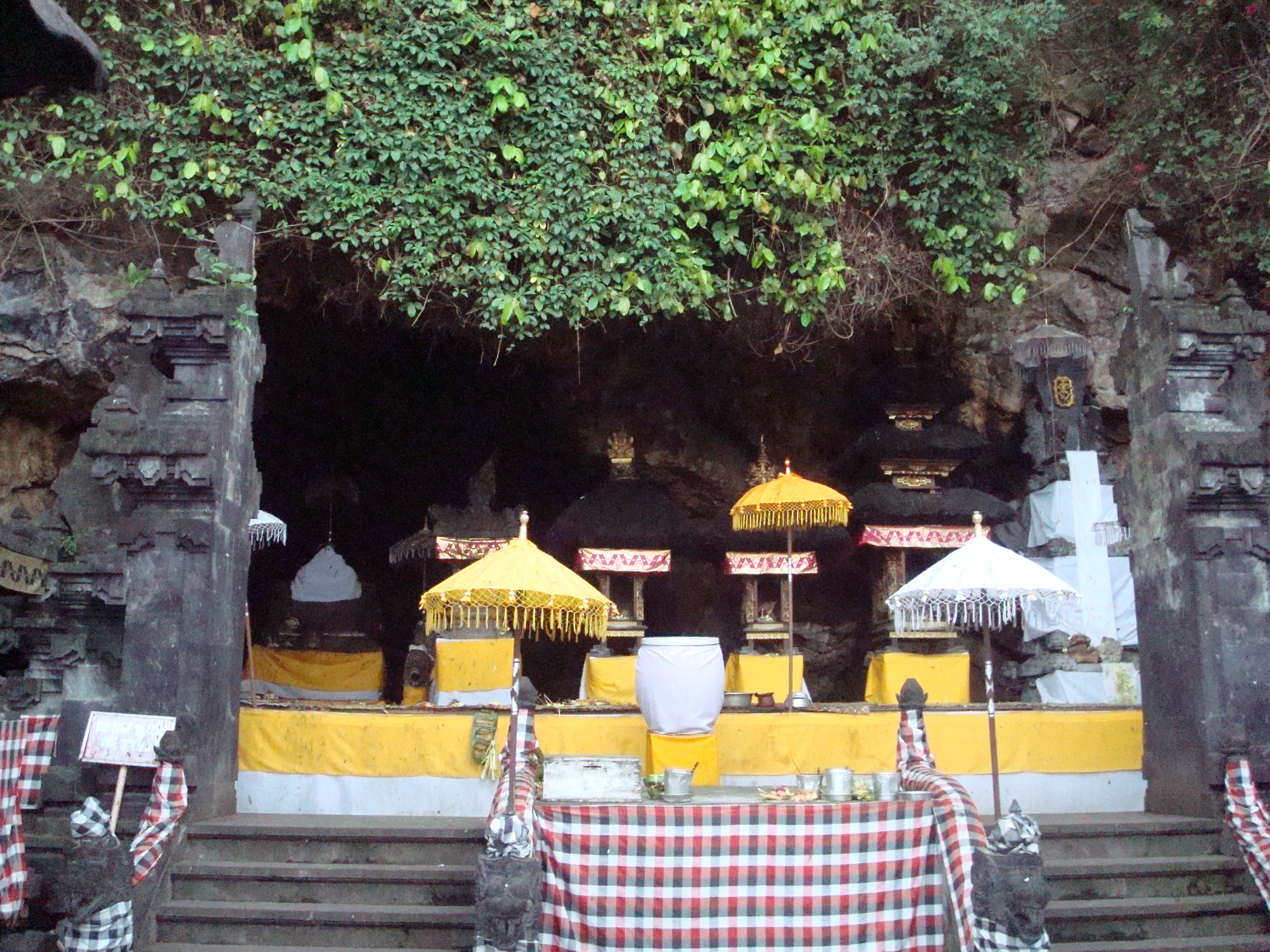
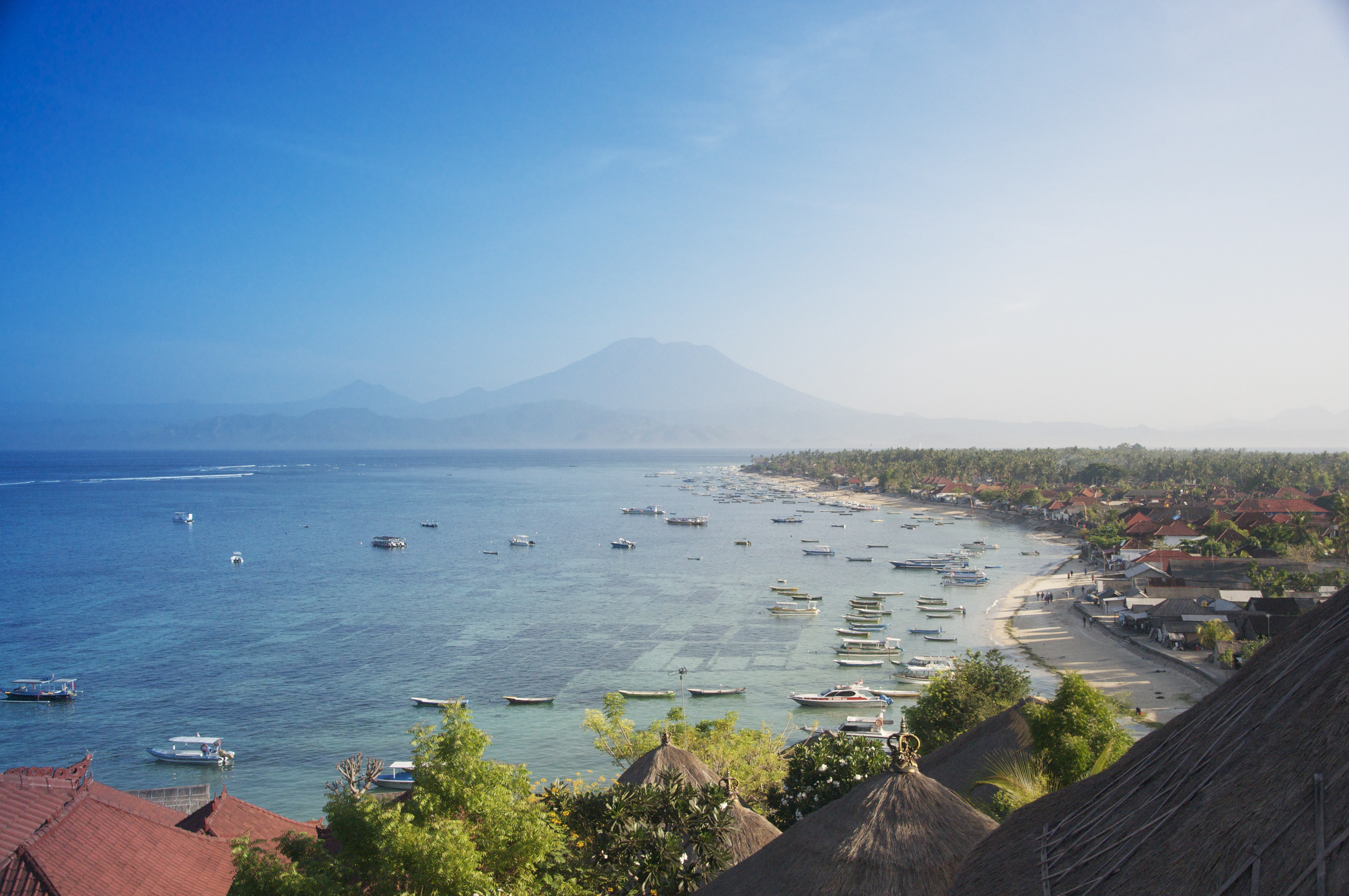
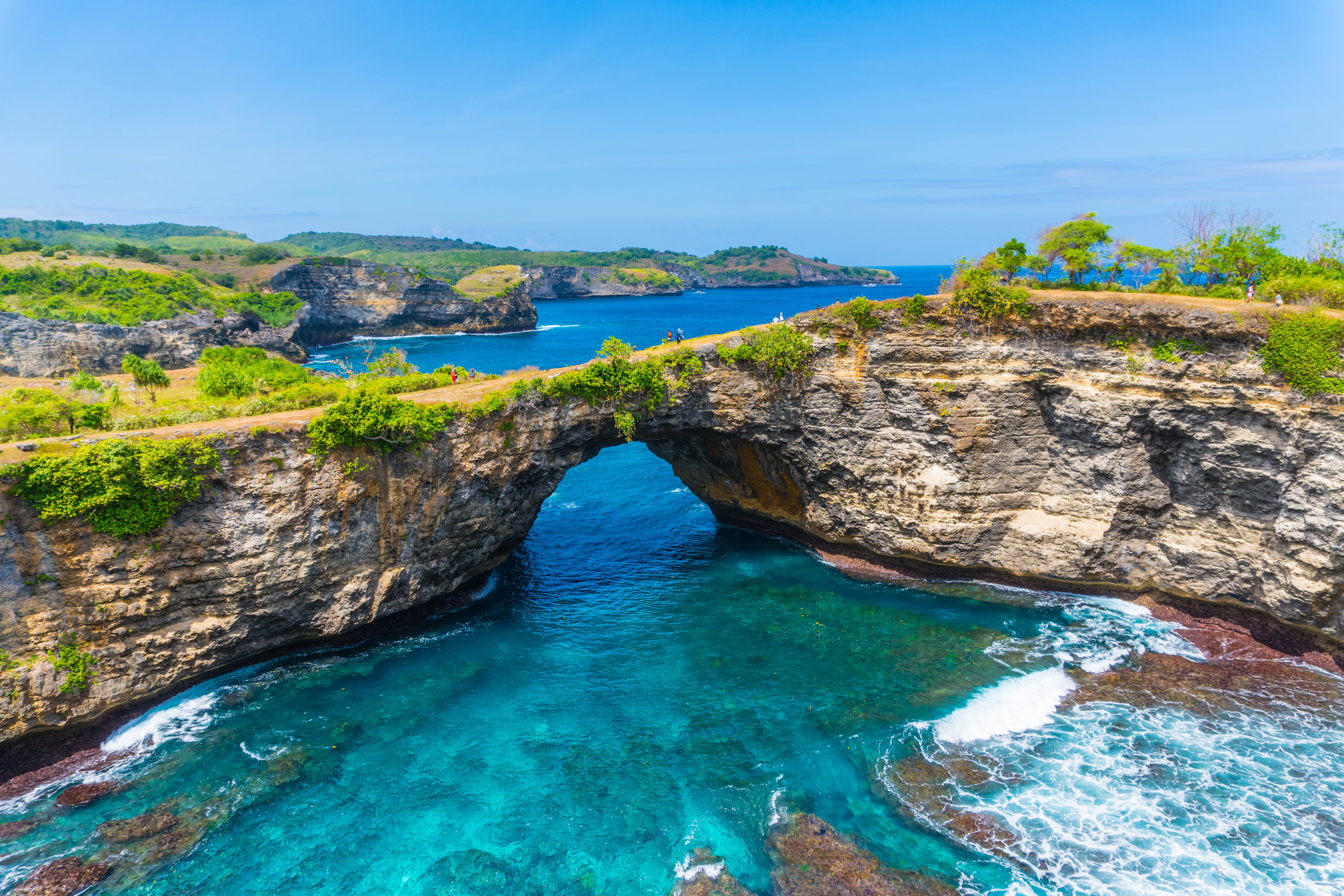
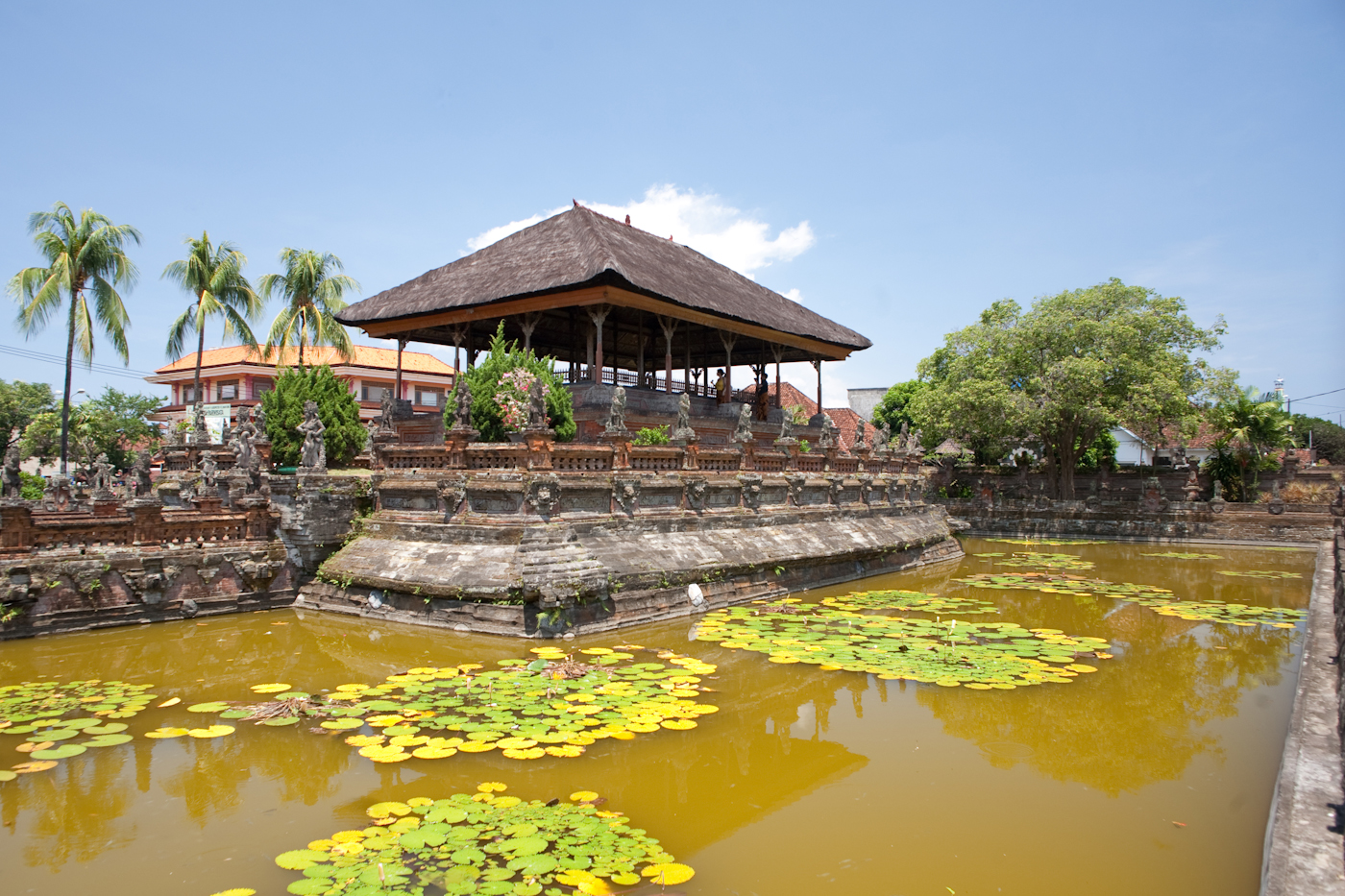
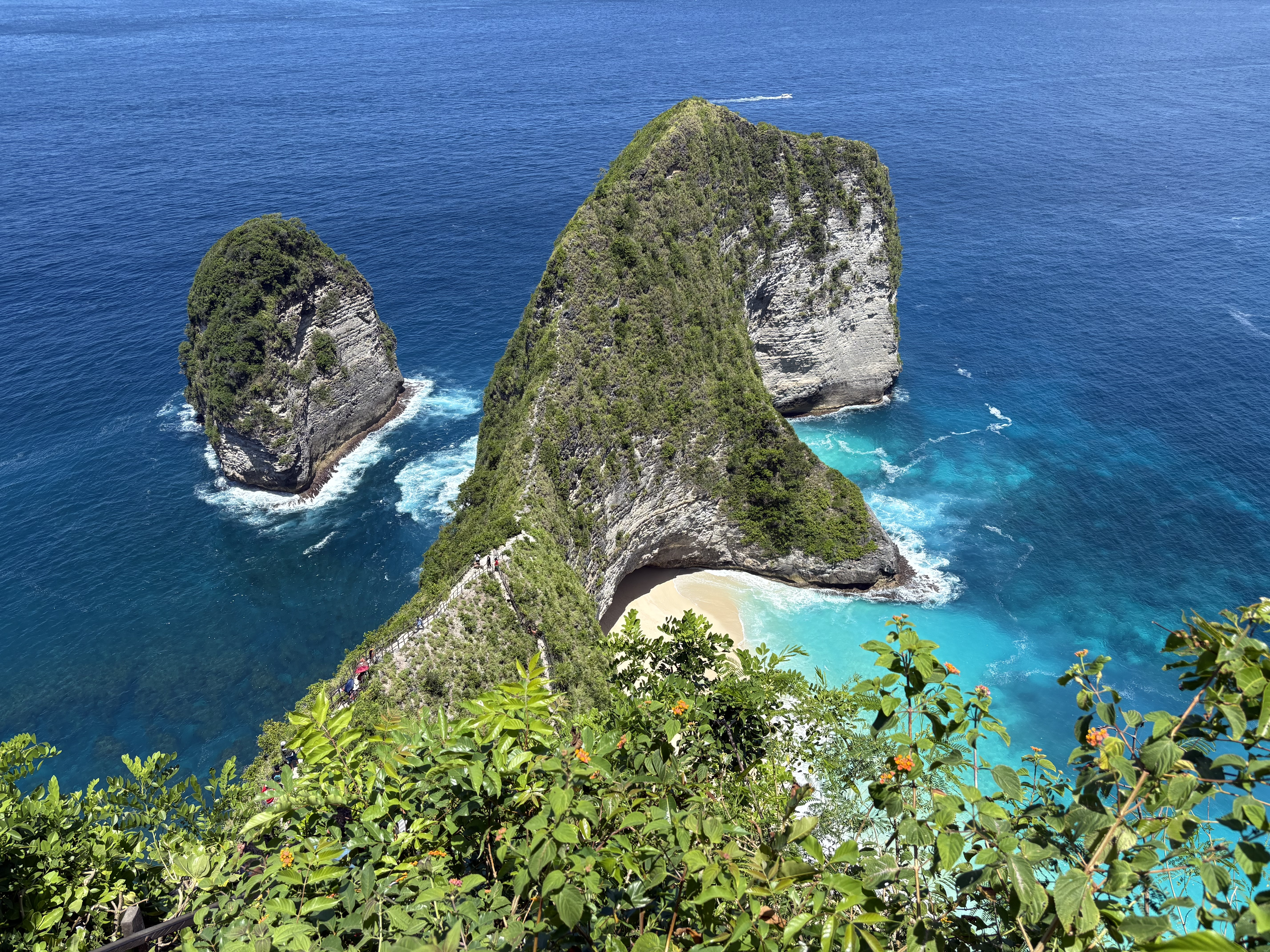
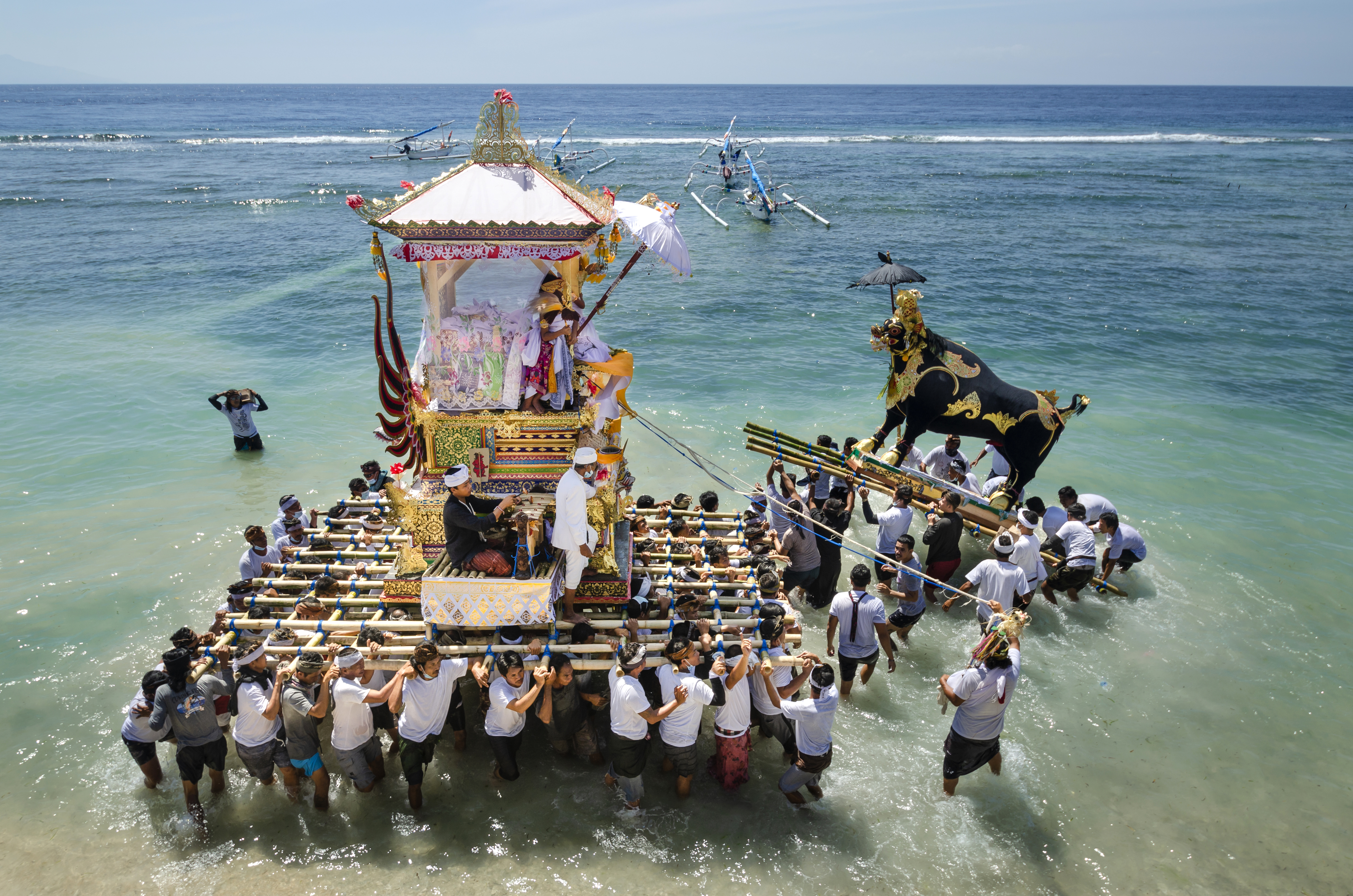
- Puri Agung Semarapura Goa Lawah Temple Jungutbatu Village, Nusa Lembongan Broken Beach, Nusa Penida Klungkung Palace Kelingking Beach, Nusa Penida Ngaben ceremony in Nusa Penida

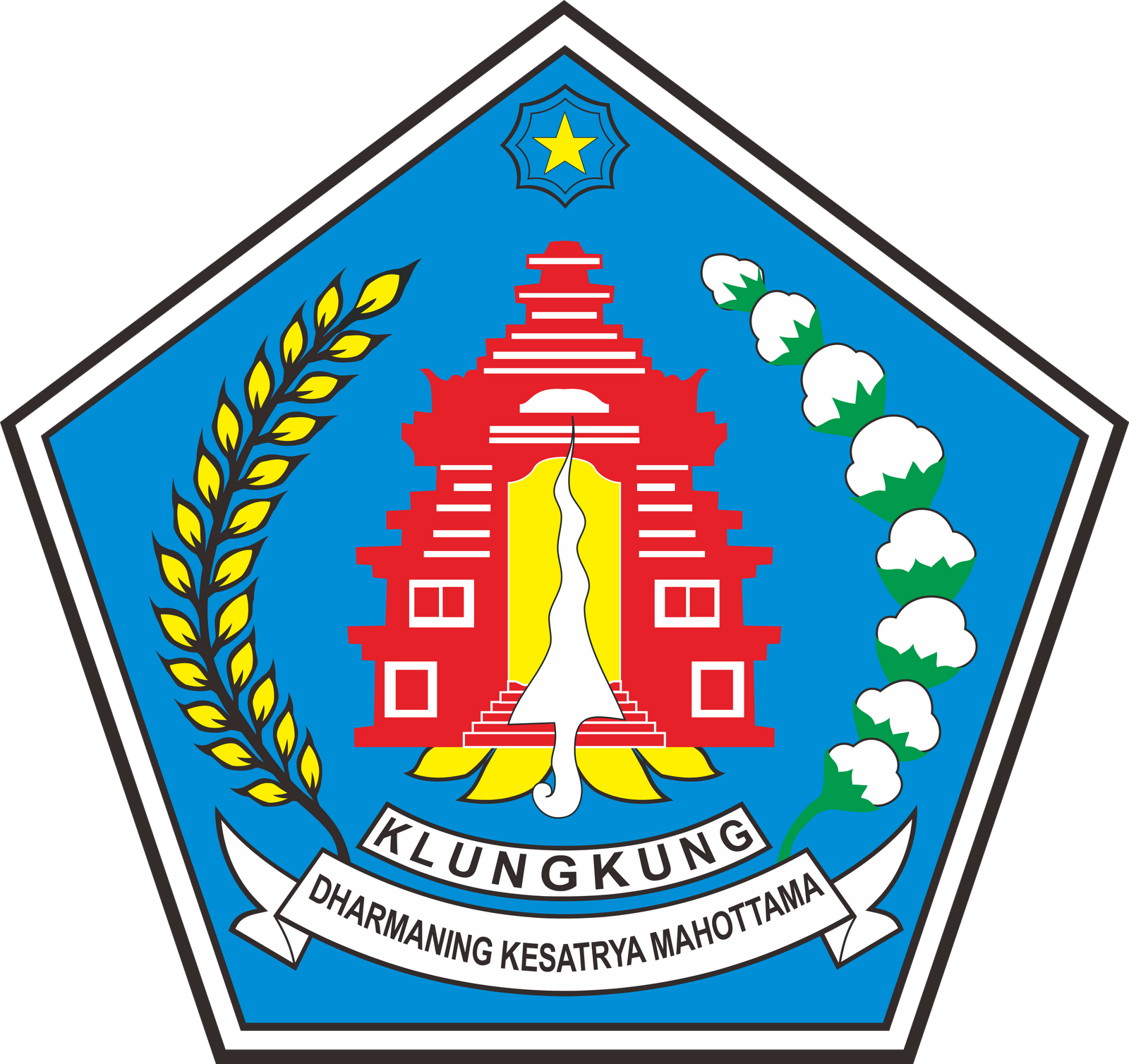
- Coat of arms
- Nicknames: Gumi Serombotan ('Land of Serombotan')
- Motto(s): Dharmaning Ksatriya Mahottama (Old Javanese) ᬟᬃᬫᬦᬶᬂᬓ᭄ᬲᬢ᭄ᬭᬶᬬᬫᬳᭀᬢ᭄ᬢᬫ "The obligation of a person with a knightly spirit is truly noble"
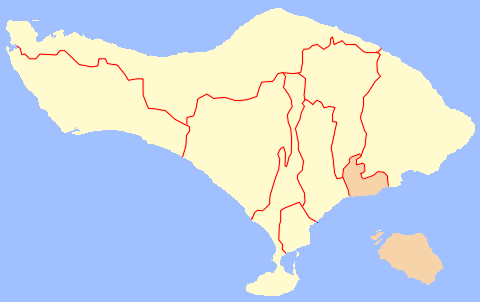
- Location within Bali

- Location in Bali Location in Lesser Sunda Islands Location in Indonesia Location in Southeast Asia Location in Asia
- Coordinates: 8°44′S 115°32′E
- Country: Indonesia
- Region: Lesser Sunda Islands
- Province: Bali
- Districts: List: Nusa Penida; Klungkung; Banjarangkan; Dawan
- Established: August 14, 1958
- Capital: Semarapura

Government
  - Body: Klungkung Regency Government
  - Regent: I Made Satria (PDI-P)
  - Vice Regent: Tjokorda Gde Surya Putra
  - Legislature: Klungkung Regency Regional House of Representatives (DPRD)

Area
  - Total: 121.62 sq mi (315.00 km^{2})

Population (mid 2024 estimate)
  - Total: 223,720
  - Density: 1,839.5/sq mi (710.22/km^{2})

Demographics
  - Ethnic groups (2010): 96.05% Balinese; 7.48% Javanese; 0.83% Sasak; 0.10% Bali Aga; 0.06% Madurese; 0.04% Sundanese; 0.01% Chinese; 0.42% other
  - Religion (2024): 95.04% Hinduism; 4.30% Islam; 0.39% Christianity; 0.28% Protestanism; 0.11% Catholicism; 0.27% Buddhism
  - Languages and dialects: Indonesian (official); Balinese (native); Lowland Balinese; Mainland Klungkung Balinese; Nusa Penida Balinese other
- Time zone: UTC+8 (ICST)
- Area code: (+62) 366
- ISO 3166 code: ID-KL
- Vehicle registration: DK
- HDI (2023): ▲0.731 high
- Website: klungkungkab.go.id

Klungkung Regency (Indonesian: Kabupaten Klungkung; Balinese: ᬓᬩᬸᬧᬢᬾᬦ᭄ᬓ᭄ᬮᬸᬂᬓᬸᬂ, Kabupatén Klungkung) is the smallest regency (kabupaten) in the province of Bali, Indonesia. It has an area of 315 km^{2} and had a population at the 2024 census of 223,720. It is bordered by Bangli Regency to its north, Gianyar Regency to its west, Karangasem Regency and the Lombok Strait to its east, and the Badung Strait and the Indian Ocean to its south. Its regency seat is the town of Semarapura.

The official estimate as of mid-2024 was 223,720 (107,177 males 106,815 and females in 2022).

Semarapura town is easily reached from Gianyar via the highway. The regency is famous for its classic Balinese paintings which mostly depict the story of epics such as Mahabharata or Ramayana. These classical style paintings come from the frescoes of the Balinese palaces and can also be found at Klungkung Palace in the downtown area. Semarajaya Museum is also located in the area.

Some 64.4% of the land area of Klungkung is made of the offshore islands of Nusa Penida, Nusa Ceningan, Nusa Lembongan and eleven smaller islands, which together form Nusa Penida District, of which the town of Sampalan is the administrative centre; the other three districts lie on the island of Bali itself, in its southeast corner.

== History ==
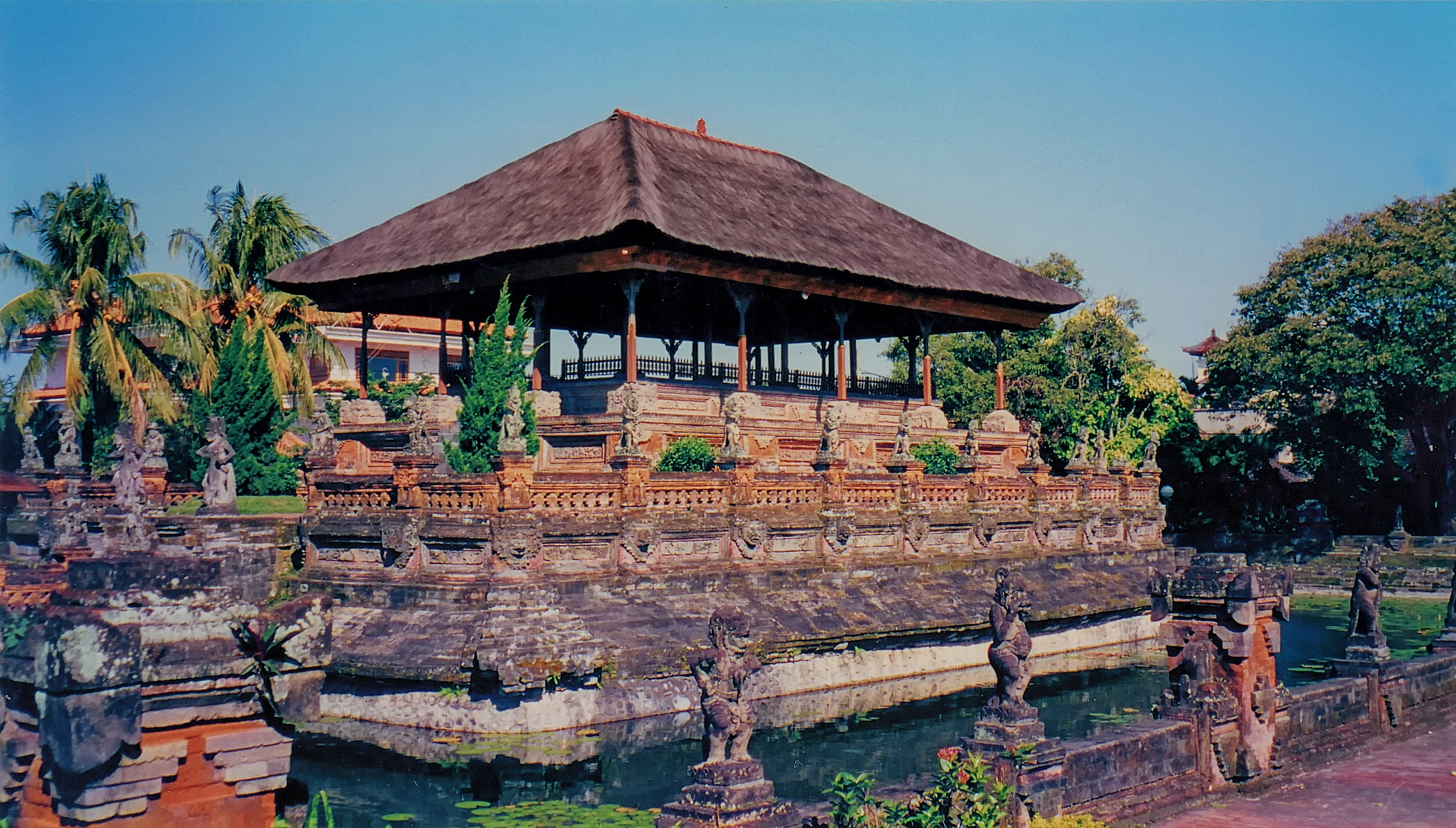
Former Kerta Gosa palace

Klungkung Regency is the successor of the Kingdom of Klungkung (Kloengkoeng in older spelling), one of several kingdoms on Bali that traces its founding to before European arrival in Southeast Asia. The realm, while small in comparison to its neighbors, is actually the most important one. Its rulers, titled Dewa Agung (lit. 'Great God'), are long considered by other lords as high king of Bali with both spiritual and temporal powers.

The royal house of Klungkung is direct descendant of the kings of Gelgel, a kingdom which ruled over the entire island, first as vassal kingdom of Majapahit, and later as an independent kingdom with influence over eastern Java and nearby Nusa Penida, Lombok, and Sumbawa. According to Babad Dalem, a breakdown in royal authority following a palace coup sometime in the 16th century resulted in regional lords attaining greater autonomy. While the royal family managed to resumed control in Klungkung, they were in no position to assert any lost authority over the now-independent rajahs. However, the rajah of Klungkung is still considered senior in rank to other rajahs.

The arrival of European ships on Balinese ports introduced the isolated island to global trade. Especially the Dutch, missions to establish economic relations soon turn into military colonial expeditions:

- First Dutch punitive expedition in Northern Bali (1846);
- Second Dutch punitive expedition in Northern Bali (1848);
- Dutch intervention in Buleleng, Karangasem, and Klungkung (1849);
- Dutch intervention in Bali (1858);
- Dutch intervention in Lombok War (1894);
- Dutch conquest of Badung and Tabanan (1906); and
- Dutch conquest of Klungkung (1908).

Following the fall of Klungkung as the last independent native realm on Bali, Dutch colonial administration either ruled the island indirectly (rulers of Karangasem and Gianyar as stedehouder, "viceroy") or directly administered public administration in the absence of local rulers. However in 1920s, living relatives of former royal houses deemed acceptable by the Dutch were appointed as regents in their fallen realms. By 1938, Paruman Agung, a council of rajahs of Bali was established, and the regents and viceroys were consecrated as kings (including Klungkung) reestablishing the kingdoms as "self-governing realms" within the Netherlands East Indies.

=== Gelgel and Klungkung Kingdom period ===
During the kingdom period, Klungkung became the center of government of the Balinese kings. Ida I Dewa Agung Jambe was the Founder of the Klungkung Kingdom in 1686 and was the successor to the Gelgel Dynasty. At that time, the Gelgel Kingdom was the center of the kingdom in Bali and the golden age of this kingdom was created during the reign of Dalem Waturenggong. The King of Klungkung was the direct heir and descendant of the Kresna Kepakisan Dynasty. Therefore, the history of Klungkung is closely related to the kings who ruled in Samprangan and Gelgel.

In 1650, there was a rebellion by a Prime Minister of the Kingdom named I Gusti Agung Maruti which caused the collapse of the Gelgel Kingdom which at that time was ruled by Dalem Di Made. Gusti Agung Maruti took over the Kingdom from Dalem Di Made, the last king who ruled the Gelgel kingdom. At that time, Dalem Di Made saved himself by fleeing to Guliang Village in the Bangli Kingdom area accompanied by the loyal Patih Agung named Rakriyan Gusti Ngurah Kubontubuh Kuthawaringin (Kyayi Jumbuh). One of his sons, Ida I Dewa Agung Jambe, with his War Commander Patih Agung Rakriyan Gusti Ngurah Kubontubuh Kuthawaringin (Kyayi Jumbuh) then succeeded in recapturing the Gelgel kingdom from the grip of I Gusti Agung Maruti in 1686 AD. Since then, Gelgel was no longer a royal place. In the northern area of Gelgel, which was later named Klungkung, that's where Ida I Dewa Agung Jambe built a palace to live. This palace was later named Semarapura or Semarajaya and Jero Agung Kepatihan Pekandelan Kyayi Jumbuh to the west. Since then the title "Dalem" was no longer used for the kings who ruled in the Klungkung Kingdom. The title held hereditarily by the kings of Klungkung was called "Dewa Agung".

During the reign of the Kepakisan Dynasty in Bali, there were two relocations of the center of the kingdom (1350–1908):

- First: from Samprangan to Gelgel by occupying the Swecalingarsapura palace ex Puri Sira Arya Kuthawaringin which was presented by his son named Kyayi Klapodhyana (Pre-Gusti Kubontubuh), and took place peacefully (1383 AD) with the ruling kings: Dalem Ketut Nglesir, Dalem Waturenggong, Dalem Bekung, Dalem Segening, and Dalem Dimade.
- Second: the center of the kingdom moved from Gelgel – Swecalingarsapura to the center of the Klungkung Kingdom – Semarajaya, with the Grand Patih Kyayi Jumbuh, between the 17th–20th centuries with King Dewa Agung Jambe, Dewa Agung Made, Dewa Agung Di Madya, Sri Agung Sakti, Sri Agung Putra Kusamba, and Dewa Agung Istri Kanya.

The Klungkung Kingdom of Bali has succeeded in reaching the peak of its glory and golden age in the fields of government, customs and arts and culture in the 14th–17th centuries under the rule of Dalem Waturenggong with the center of the kingdom in the Gelgel Palace – Swecapura has a territory of power up to Lombok and Blambangan. The Puputan Klungkung war occurred when the center of the Klungkung kingdom was already in the Semarapura palace.

Several kings have ruled hereditarily in the Klungkung Kingdom, and the last was Ida I Dewa Agung Gede Jambe (Ida I Dewa Agung Putra IV), the same name as the king who founded the Klungkung Kingdom. The Klungkung Kingdom did not last long, the kingdom's territory was divided into small kingdoms such as the Badung, Gianyar, Karangasem, Buleleng, Bangli, Tabanan, Jembrana, Denpasar kingdoms and the Klungkung kingdom itself.

During the reign of the last Klungkung king, Ida I Dewa Agung Gede Jambe, on April 28, 1908, a shocking event occurred in the Klungkung Kingdom. Dutch soldiers under the command of General M.B.Rost Van Tonningen had attacked the Klungkung Kingdom. King Ida I Dewa Agung Jambe accompanied by the Bahudanda (Royal Dignitaries) and all his loyal people tried to put up a fierce resistance against the attack of the Dutch troops, but in vain. The king and his followers died on the Puputan field. While on the Dutch side, although there were also some who were killed and injured, it did not mean anything to the integrity of the Dutch troops, but it was enough to give a psychological blow to the Dutch. This incident is known as "Puputan Klungkung". Since then, the Klungkung Kingdom has been a Dutch colony.

==== Kusamba War (May 24, 1849) ====
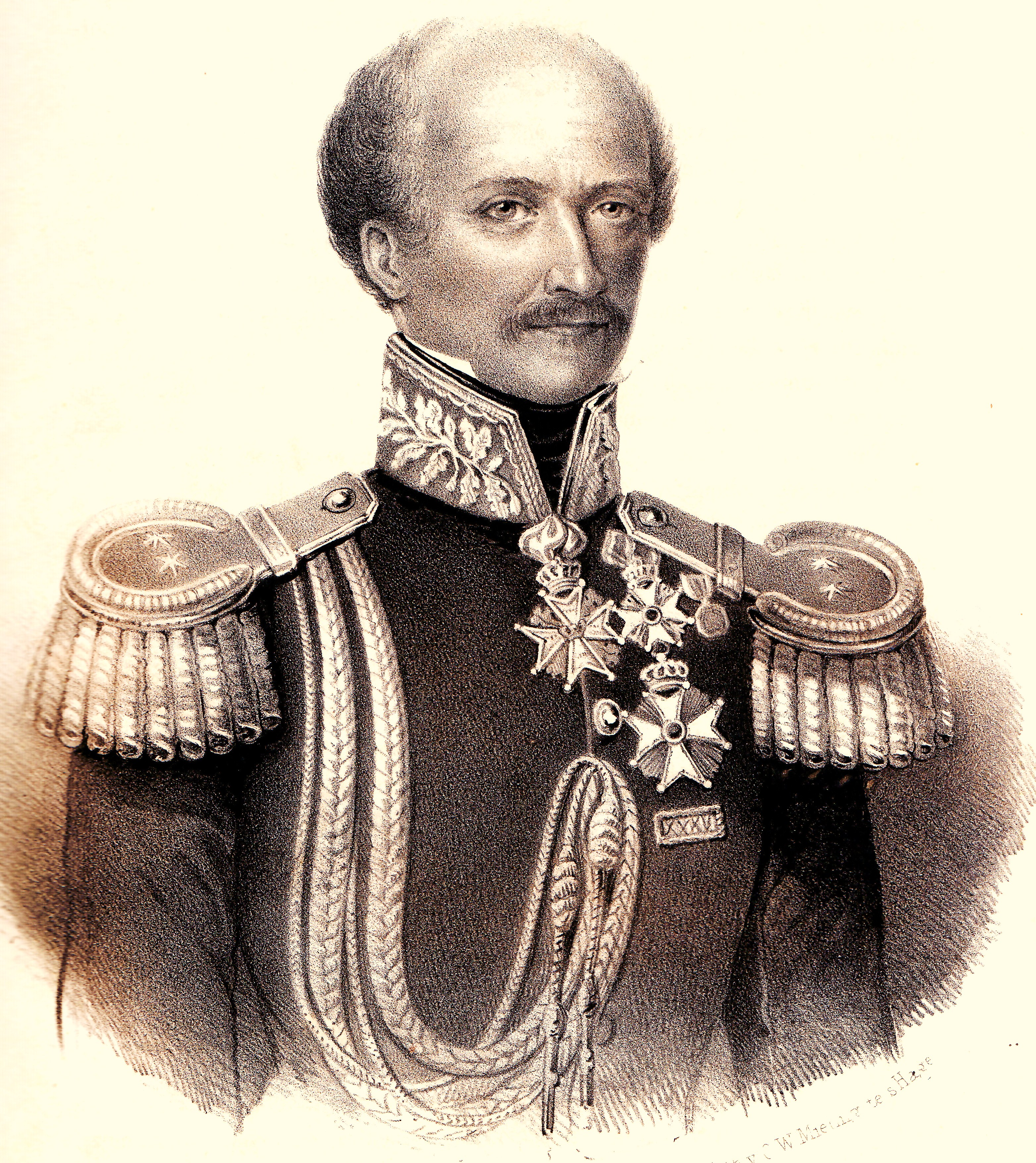
Michiels, AV

Kusamba, a relatively large village east of Semarapura until the 18th century, is better known as an important port of the Klungkung Kingdom. Geographically, Kusamba Village hasstrategic position as the main port of the Klungkung Kingdom. Kusamba Village has an important historical trace in the history of Bali. The name Kusamba Village is taken from the root word kusa (grass) because at that time many of these plants were found in the area that we currently know as Kusamba Village. Kusamba Village became increasingly well-known in the history of Balinese politics when King I Dewa Agung Putra built a palace in the village located on the coast. In fact, I Dewa Agung Putra ran the government from the palace which was later named Kusanegara. Until then, Kusamba practically became the second center of government of the Klungkung Kingdom. The relocation of the center of government inevitably helped to advance Kusamba as a port that at that time was equal to other royal ports in Bali such as Kuta.

The name Kusamba soared even more when political tensions intensified between Dewa Agung Istri Kanya as the ruler of Klungkung and the Dutch in the mid-19th century. Until finally an important war event broke out in the history of Balinese heroism, Kusamba War, which resulted in a landslide victory by successfully killing the Dutch general, General AV Michiels.

The heroic drama began with the stranding of two skoners (boats) belonging to G.P. King, a Dutch agent based in Ampenan, Lombok at the Batulahak harbor, around the Pesinggahan area. This ship was then seized by the residents of Pesinggahan and Dawan. The King of Klungkung himself considered the presence of the ship whose crew was mostly Sasak people as a troublemaker so he immediately ordered to kill it.

By Mads Lange, a Danish businessman living in Kuta who was also a Dutch agent was reported to the Dutch representative in Besuki. The Dutch resident in Besuki strongly protested Klungkung's actions and considered it a violation of the May 24, 1843, agreement on the abolition of the Tawan Karang law. The Dutch's anger increased with Klungkung's attitude in helping Buleleng in the Jagaraga War, April 1849. Therefore, the Dutch wanted to attack Klungkung.

The Dutch expedition, which had just finished facing Buleleng in the Jagaraga War, was immediately deployed to Padang Cove (now Padang Bai) to attack Klungkung. It was decided that May 24, 1849, would be the day of the attack.

Klungkung itself was already aware of the Dutch attack. Therefore, the defense at Pura Goa Lawah was strengthened. Led by Ida I Dewa Agung Istri Kanya, Anak Agung Ketut Agung and Anak Agung Made Sangging, Klungkung decided to defend Klungkung at Goa Lawah and Puri Kusanegara in Kusamba.

A tense war broke out at Pura Goa Lawah. However, because of the unequal number of troops and weapons, the Klungkung troops were forced to retreat to Kusamba. Even in this port village, the Klungkung troops were powerless. That afternoon, Kusamba fell into the hands of the Dutch. The Klungkung troops retreated westward by burning villages bordering Kusamba to prevent the Dutch army from attacking Puri Klungkung.

The fall of Kusamba enraged Dewa Agung Istri Kanya. That night a strategy was drawn up to retake Kusamba which gave birth to the decision to attack Kusamba on May 25, 1849, in the early hours of the morning. Incidentally, that night, the Dutch army set up camp at Puri Kusamba because they were feeling exhausted.

This was taken full advantage of by Dewa Agung Istri Kanya. A few hours later at around 03.00, led by Anak Agung Ketut Agung, the Sikep and Pemating Klungkung ambushed the Dutch army in Kusamba. The Dutch army who were resting were immediately in a panic. In the dark situation and not understanding the situation at Puri Kusamba, they were in a panic.

In that chaotic situation, General Michels stood in front of the palace. To find out the situation, the Dutch army fired light bullets into the air. The situation became bright. In fact, this situation was taken advantage of by the Pemating Klungkung troops to approach General Michels. At that moment, a Canon cannon which in Klungkung myth is considered a sacred weapon with the name I Selisik, said to be able to find its own target was fired and immediately hit Michels' right leg. The general fell over.

This condition forced the Dutch army to retreat to Padang Bai. General Michels himself, whose leg was about to be amputated, finally died at around 23:00. Two days later, his body was sent to Batavia. In addition to Michels, Captain H Everste and seven Dutch soldiers were also reported dead, including 28 injured.

Klungkung itself lost around 800 Klungkung troops, including 1,000 injured. However, the Kusamba War was undoubtedly a brilliant victory because it succeeded in killing a Dutch general. It was very rare for the Dutch to lose their warlord, especially since Michels was recorded as having won the war in seven regions.

Although finally on June 10, 1849, Kusamba fell back into Dutch hands in the second attack led by Lektol Van Swieten, the Kusamba War was an achievement that should not be ignored. Not only the death of General Michels, the Kusamba War also showed the maturity of strategy and a clear attitude to life of the Klungkung fighters.

==== Klungkung Puputan War (April 21, 1908) ====
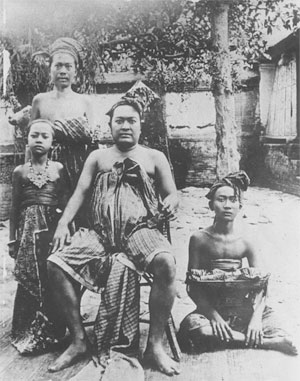
Dewa Agung Jambe

Klungkung Puputan began with the Gelgel War which broke out on April 18, 1908. Then on April 21, 1908, the Dutch deployed their navy from Jumpai beach and the next day landed in Kusamba and attacked Klungkung from the east, west, and south. The King of Klungkung I Dewa Agung Jambe along with his family and people fought tooth and nail (puputan) until they died.

This was a ritualistic suicidal resistance by the rulers and their followers against a detachment of well-armed Dutch colonial troops. In the end almost two hundred Balinese were killed by Dutch bullets. After this incident, Klungkung was placed under direct Dutch rule. In 1929 the nephew of the last ruler, Dewa Agung Oka Geg, was appointed regent by the colonial authorities. In 1938 his status and that of seven other Balinese regents were recognized as sovereign as zelfbestuurder or kings. After the formation of the unitary state of Indonesia in 1949–1950, the office of king was abolished in Bali and elsewhere. The title Dewa Agung was no longer used following the death of Dewa Agung Oka Geg in 1964. Since then members of his family have been elected several times to lead Klungkung as regents.

=== Dutch East Indies period (1929–1942) ===
To restore the situation of the Klungkung Kingdom that had just been conquered, namely in an effort to get its people to give sympathy and support to the new Kingdom Government, the Dutch East Indies Government decided to appoint an appropriate figure to become king. The figure was none other than Ida I Dewa Agung Gede Oka Geg. His coronation as regent (Zelfbesturder Landschap Van Klungkung) was carried out in July 1929. This strategy was able to restore the situation in the Klungkung Kingdom until finally the Indonesian nation proclaimed its Independence on August 17, 1945. This system of self-rule was maintained somewhat during Japanese occupation of the colony, though the occupying Japanese force intervened in various kingdoms, forcefully deposing local rulers. In 1946, Dutch colonial administration returned to the island, and began to introduce Bali rulers to the idea of a federation of states in eastern Indonesia, in opposition to unitarian Indonesian Republic. By 1947, the State of East Indonesia was formed with Bali as a part of it. In 1949, the state became part of United States of Indonesia, and in less than a year, decided to merge into Republic of Indonesia. With it, the kingdom of Klungkung loses its sovereignty and transformed into the current Regency of Klungkung, a subdivision of the Province of Bali.

=== Japanese occupation period (1929–1945) ===
Zelfbestuur or also known as the term swapraja is a term for a region that has the right to self-government. Swapraja status means that the region is led by natives and has the right to regulate its internal administrative, legal, and cultural affairs. The Japanese occupation government (1942–1945) replaced the status of the swaraja region with kochi. Furthermore, after the proclamation of Indonesian independence, through the Emergency Law of the Republic of Indonesia no. 69 of 1958 dated August 9, 1958, concerning the Establishment of Level II Regions in the Level I Regions of Bali, West Nusa Tenggara and East Nusa Tenggara, the Klungkung Swapraja Region was changed into the Klungkung Level II Region.

=== Independence era ===
When Law No. 18 of 1965 was implemented, DATI II was changed to the name DATI II Regency and then refined again with the issuance of Law No. 5 of 1974 which replaced the name of the Regency. And along with the passage of time, the capital of the regency, namely Klungkung City, was also changed and its name was officially inaugurated as Semarapura City on April 28, 1992, by the Minister of Home Affairs Rudini based on Government Regulation (PP) No. 18 of 1992. Furthermore, every April 28 is designated as Puputan Klungkung Day and the Anniversary of Semarapura City. The anniversary of the city of Semarapura also coincides with the inauguration of the Puputan Klungkung Monument.

Currently, the regency is the smallest (excluding Denpasar, which is a city and smaller in size) and least populated in Bali, as well as least visited by tourists.

== Geography ==
Klungkung Regency is the second smallest regency after Denpasar City of the 9 regencies and cities in Bali, with an area of 315 km^{2} (122 sq mi). Astronomically, Klungkung Regency is located between 115°21'28" East Longitude – 115°37'43" East Longitude and 8°27'37" South Latitude – 8°49'00" South Latitude. Klungkung Regency consists of several islands, some of which are on the island of Bali (Banjarangkan District, Klungkung District, and Dawan District), while Nusa Penida District is separated from the island of Bali with the three largest islands, namely Nusa Penida Island, Nusa Lembongan Island, and Nusa Ceningan Island. Klungkung Regency is divided into four districts with the largest district being Nusa Penida District with an area of 202.84 km^{2} (78.32 sq mi) and the smallest district is Klungkung District with an area of 29.05 km^{2} (11.22 sq mi).

=== Topography ===
Topographically, the Klungkung Regency area has a variety of land surface heights. Based on its height, the Klungkung Regency area is dominated by hilly areas with an altitude of between 100–500 meters above sea level with an area of 227.48 km^{2} (87.83 sq mi) or 72.22% of the total area of Klungkung Regency, then followed by lowlands with an altitude of between 0–100 meters above sea level with an area of 86.27 km^{2} (33.31 sq mi) or 27.38% of the total area of Klungkung Regency, and finally followed by highlands with an altitude of more than 500 meters above sea level with an area of only 1.25 km² or 0.4% of the total area of Klungkung Regency.

Based on the slope level, the Klungkung Regency area is mostly an area with a slope level of 0–15% which means it is predominantly flat to gently sloping with an area of 154.26 km^{2} (59.56 sq mi), then followed by a slope level of 15% -40% which is rather steep to steep with an area of 144.27 km^{2} (55.70 sq mi), and followed by a slope level of >40% which is very steep with an area of 16.47 km^{2} (6.36 sq mi).

=== Hydrology ===
Hydrologically, the Klungkung Regency area is traversed by several rivers that originate from the northern and central regions of Bali Island which then flow into the Badung Strait and also several rivers that originate in the middle of Nusa Penida Island then flow into the Badung Strait, the Indonesian Ocean, or the Lombok Strait. The longest rivers in Klungkung Regency are Tukad Telaga Waja, Tukad Rangka, and Tukad Pulo with a river flow length of 33 km. Meanwhile, the shortest river in the district is Tukad Bubungan with a flow length of 6 km.

=== Climate ===
Like other regions in southern Indonesia, Klungkung Regency has a tropical climate with a wet and dry tropical climate type (Am) which has two seasonal patterns caused by the movement of the monsoon winds, namely the rainy season and the dry season. The rainy season in Klungkung Regency occurs due to the blowing of the westerly monsoon winds which are wet, humid, and carry a lot of water vapor and usually lasts from November to April. Meanwhile, the dry season in this region occurs due to the blowing of the dry eastern monsoon winds and generally occurs in the period May to October. The number of rainy days in the Klungkung Regency area ranges from 100 to 160 rainy days per year. The air temperature in the Klungkung Regency area ranges from 22 °C to 34 °C with a relative humidity level of 60% to 90%.

Climate data for Bangli Regency
Month	Jan	Feb	Mar	Apr	May	Jun	Jul	Aug	Sep	Oct	Nov	Dec	Year
Mean daily maximum °C (°F)	28.7 (83.7)	28.8 (83.8)	28.8 (83.8)	28.6 (83.5)	28.2 (82.8)	27.3 (81.1)	26.4 (79.5)	26.5 (79.7)	27.3 (81.1)	28.6 (83.5)	28.8 (83.8)	28.7 (83.7)	28.1 (82.5)
Daily mean °C (°F)	26.0 (78.8)	26.0 (78.8)	26.0 (78.8)	25.8 (78.4)	25.6 (78.1)	25.0 (77.0)	24.5 (76.1)	24.4 (75.9)	25.1 (77.2)	25.8 (78.4)	26.2 (79.2)	26.4 (79.5)	25.6 (78.0)
Mean daily minimum °C (°F)	23.8 (74.8)	23.4 (74.1)	23.3 (73.9)	23.2 (73.8)	23.3 (73.9)	22.7 (72.9)	21.8 (71.2)	21.2 (70.2)	21.5 (70.7)	22.6 (72.7)	23.4 (74.1)	23.9 (75.0)	22.8 (73.1)
Average precipitation mm (inches)	200 (7.9)	180 (7.1)	220 (8.7)	160 (6.3)	90 (3.5)	56 (2.2)	44 (1.7)	23 (0.9)	37 (1.5)	60 (2.4)	119 (4.7)	147 (5.8)	1,336 (52.7)
Average precipitation days (≥ days)	25	22	24	24	20	17	18	15	14	17	23	26	245
Source: Weather-Atlas / NomadSeason / Weatherspark

=== Borders ===
Administratively, the Klungkung Regency area borders several areas, namely

=== North ===
- Bangli Regency

=== South ===
- Badung Strait & Indian Ocean

=== West ===
- Gianyar Regency

=== East ===
- Karangasem Regency
- Lombok Strait

== Government and politics ==
No.	Regent	Starting office	Ended office	Vice Regent
6	I Made Satria	February 20, 2025	Incumbent	Tjokorda Gde Surya Putra

=== Parliament ===
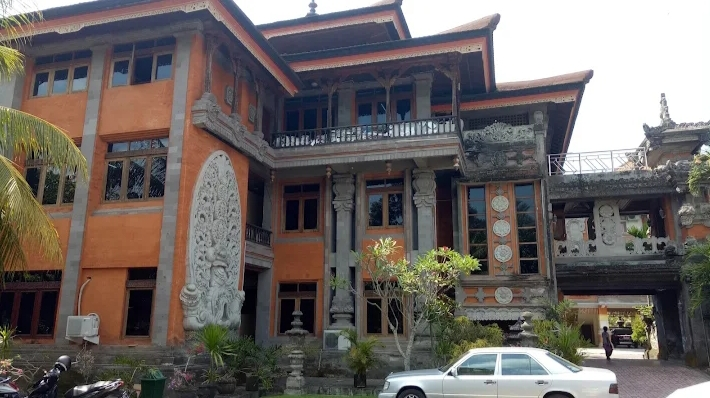
Klungkung's parliament (DPRD) building

=== Administrative districts ===
The regency is divided into four districts (kecamatan), listed below with their areas and their populations at the 2010 Census and the 2020 Census, together with the official estimates as of mid-2024 and the population density at that date. The table also includes the locations of the district administrative centres, the number of administrative villages in each district (totaling 53 rural desa and 6 urban kelurahan – the latter all in the Semarapura part of Klungkung District), and its postal codes.

Kode Wilayah	Name of District (kecamatan)	Area in km^{2}	Pop'n Census 2010	Pop'n Census 2020	Pop'n Estimate mid 2024	Density (per km^{2}) in 2024	Admin centre	No. of villages	Post codes
51.05.01	Nusa Penida	202.84	45,110	57,370	65,820	324.5	Sampalan	16	80771
51.05.02	Banjarangkan	45.73	37,115	44,431	47,140	1,030.8	Banjarangkan	13 ^{(a)}	80752
51.05.03	Klungkung	29.05	55,141	64,235	67,070	2,308.8	Semarapura	18	80711 -80716
51.05.04	Dawan	37.38	33,177	40,889	43,700	1,169.1	Dawan	12	80761
	Totals	315.00	170,543	206,925	223,720	710.2	Semarapura	59	

Note: (a) including the 6 kelurahan of Semarapura Kaja, Semarapura Kangin, Semarapura Kauh, Semarapura Klod, Semarapura Klod Kangin and Semarapura Tengah.

== Tourism ==
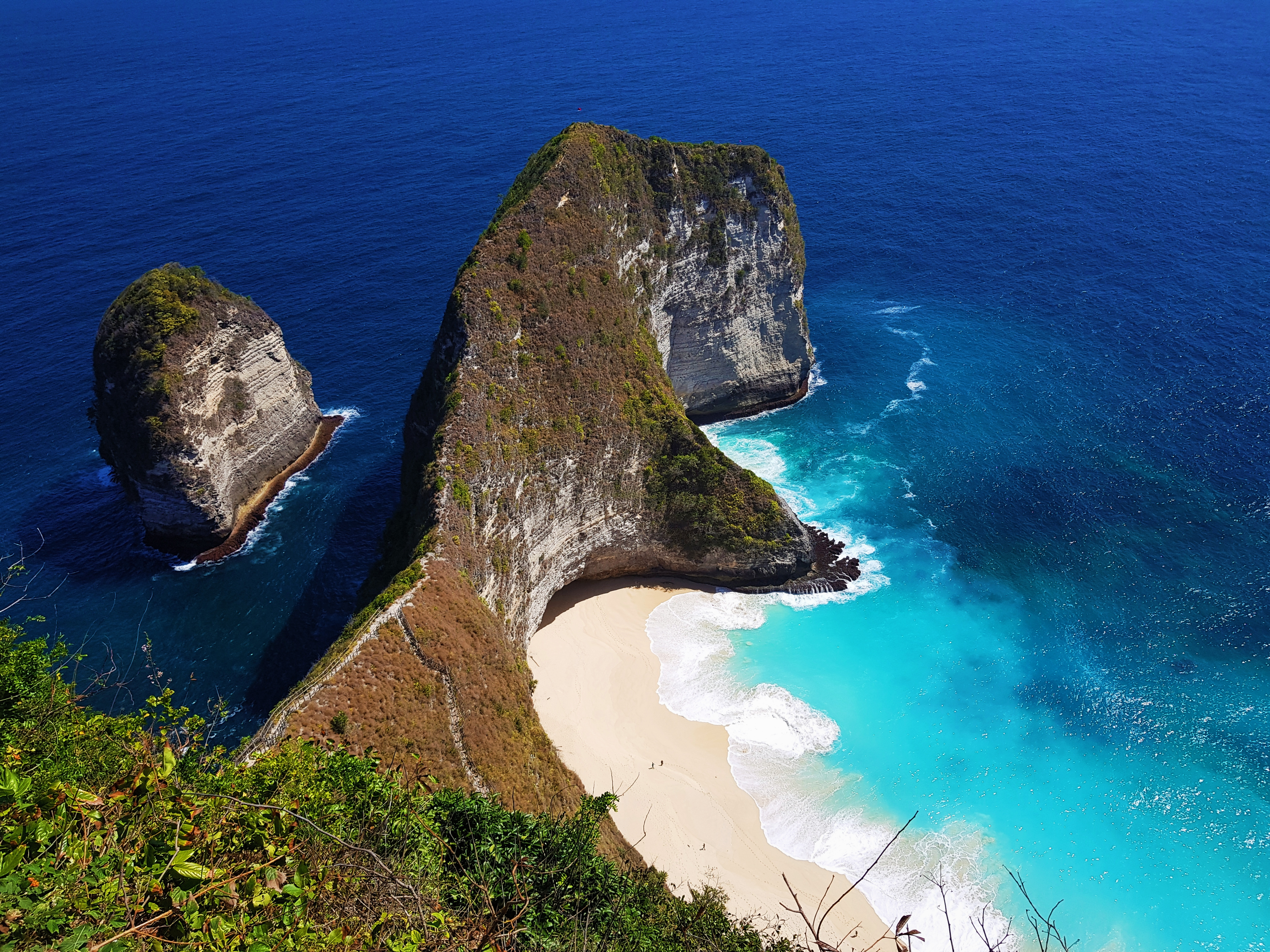
Kelingking Beach Nusa Penida

Klungkung is very dependent on tourism, tourism is the mainstay of Klungkung's economy.

=== Puputan Monument ===
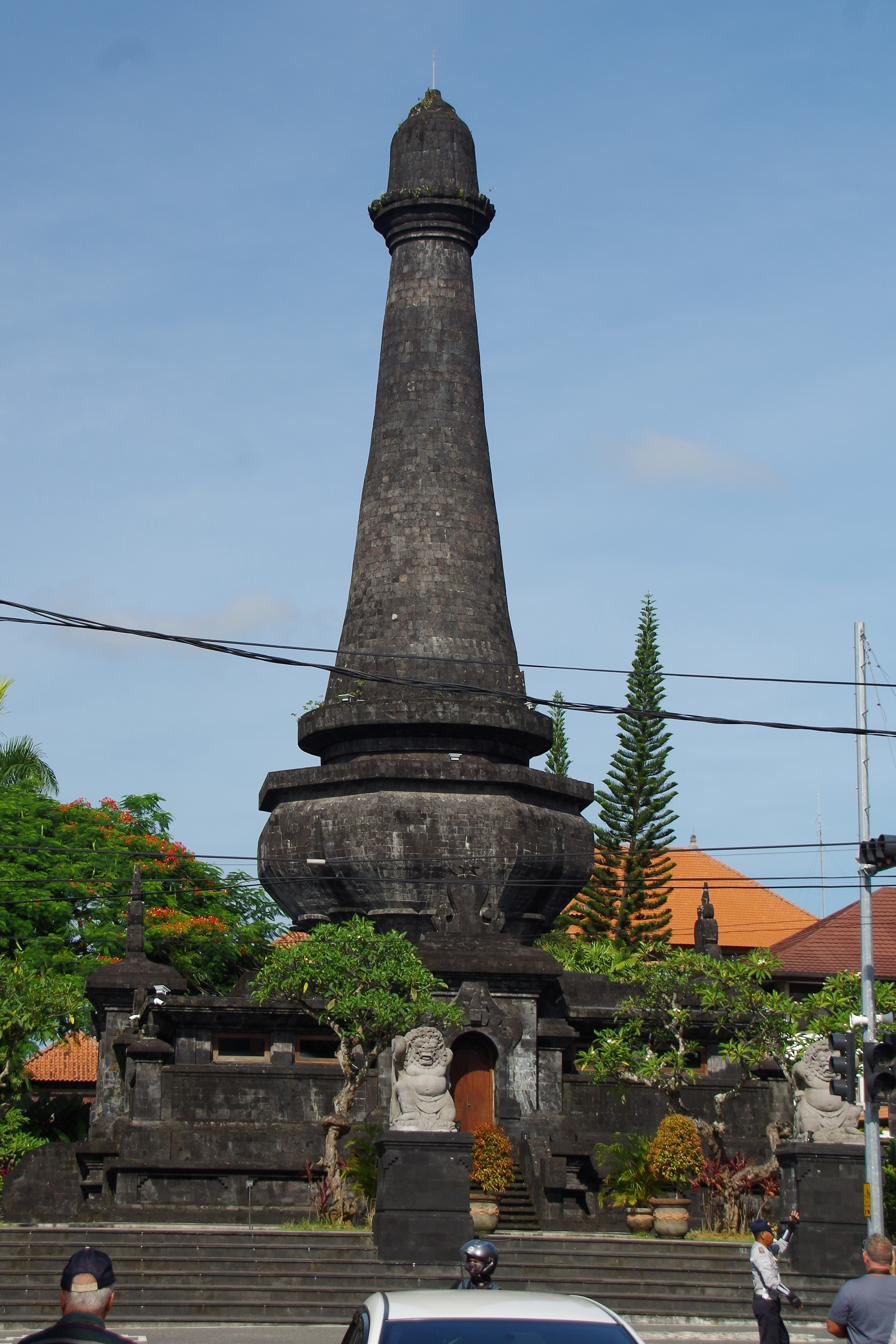
Klungkung Puputan Monument

The Puputan Klungkung Monument is a monument of pride for the people of Klungkung. This monument is a symbol of the struggle of the people and the kingdom of Klungkung against the invaders. The Puputan Klungkung Monument is located in the middle of Semarapura, the capital of Klungkung, precisely on Jalan Untung Surapati. This place is in a strategic position because it is located in the middle of the city's hustle and bustle, the shopping center in Klungkung, traditional markets, Klungkung government offices and is located adjacent to Kertha Gosa. If from the center of Denpasar, it can be reached via Jalan By Pass Ngurah Rai. From Jalan By Pass Ngurah Rai, continue towards Jalan By Pass Prof. Ida Bagus Mantra. Along this road we can see the southern coastline of Bali and also the road is still smooth because the By Pass project on this route has just been completed. Continue along this road until you reach Takmung village which is part of Klungkung Regency. The journey is getting closer because we only need to drive about 10 minutes to reach the city center of Semarapura (the capital of Klungkung).

The Puputan Klungkung Monument was built to commemorate the services of the heroes and knights of the Klungkung kingdom against the Dutch colonial attacks during the colonial era. The Puputan Klungkung Monument is a monument to commemorate the historic day of Puputan Klungkung which used to occur on Tuesday Umanis, April 28, 1908. It was around the area of this monument that the all-out resistance (puputan war) against the Dutch colonialists used to take place.

The Puputan Klungkung Monument appears towering in the middle of the hustle and bustle of the city center of Semarapura. This monument is about 28 meters high and stands on a land area of about 128 m2. The shape of this monument is generally the same as the commemorative monuments in Bali and characterizes Balinese architectural art, consisting of a lingga and yoni. At the bottom of the lingga there is a compartmentalized room equipped with 4 interconnected gated entrances. The doors are located to the north, east, south and west of the lingga building at the bottom. In the middle between the compartmentalized room and the lingga there is an octagonal dome building whose base is decorated with 19 lotus flowers. And overall the numbers on this monument will reflect the historic date for the Klungkung community April 28, 1908. Around the monument is equipped with a bale bengong in each corner of the yard and usually this bale bengong is used as a place for group study by elementary, junior high and high school students in Klungkung.

=== Kamasan tourism village ===
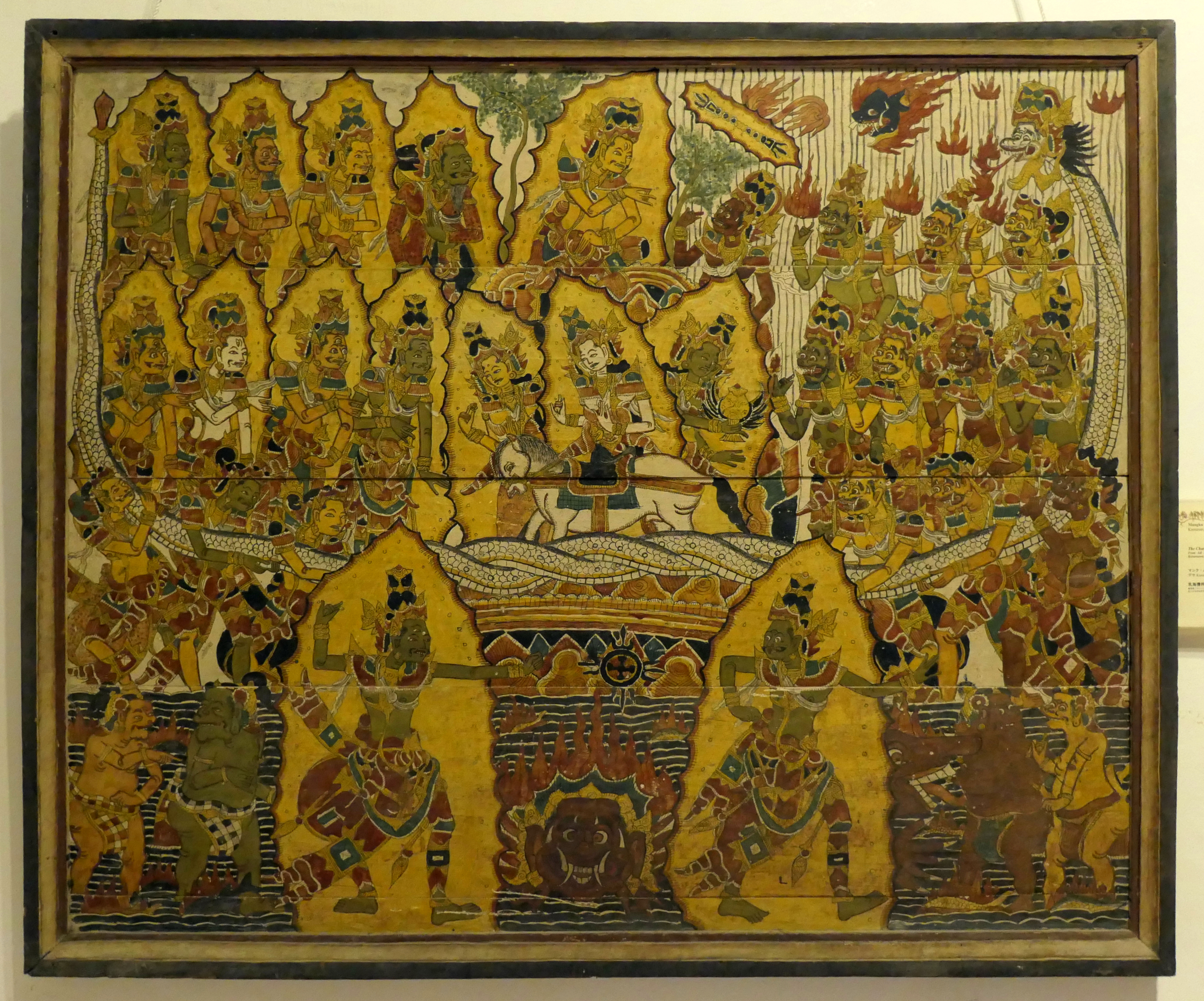
A Wayang painting in Kamasan

Classical wayang painting in Bali can be identified in Kamasan village of Klungkung district. This style of painting has been retained by many generations and still many people in the community survive through painting.

Kamasan is a community of traditional painting artists. So intimate and so long the development of traditional painting that the artists say the paintings there have their own style, namely traditional Kamasan painting. In fact, artistic talent also grows in other works of art, namely gold and silver carvings and the last is bullet carving. Although in terms of the material used, metal colored cloth follows the changes that occur, its characteristics remain apparent in the theme of the painting or carving, namely depicting wayang figures.

Traditional Kamasan Wayang painting The origin of traditional Kamasan style wayang painting, according to I Made Kanta (1977), is a continuation of the tradition of painting wong-wongan (humans with the surrounding environment) in prehistoric times until the arrival of Hinduism in Bali and this expertise had the opportunity to develop well. Many stories painted in the Kamasan style contain elements of art and philosophical meaning taken from the Ramayana and Mahabharata, including the forms of pawukon and palelidon. One example of the legacy of Kamasan painting has decorated the ceiling in Taman Gili and Kerthagosa, Semarapura, Klungkung.

Kamasan as the center of the development of classical Balinese traditional painting and carving is the name of a village in the District and Regency of Klungkung. Kamasan Village is geographically a lowland village close to Klotok beach or Jumpai beach ± 3 km. The distance from Denpasar to this village is around 43 km. Access is very easy because it is close to the center of Semarapura City, Klungkung.

== Gallery ==
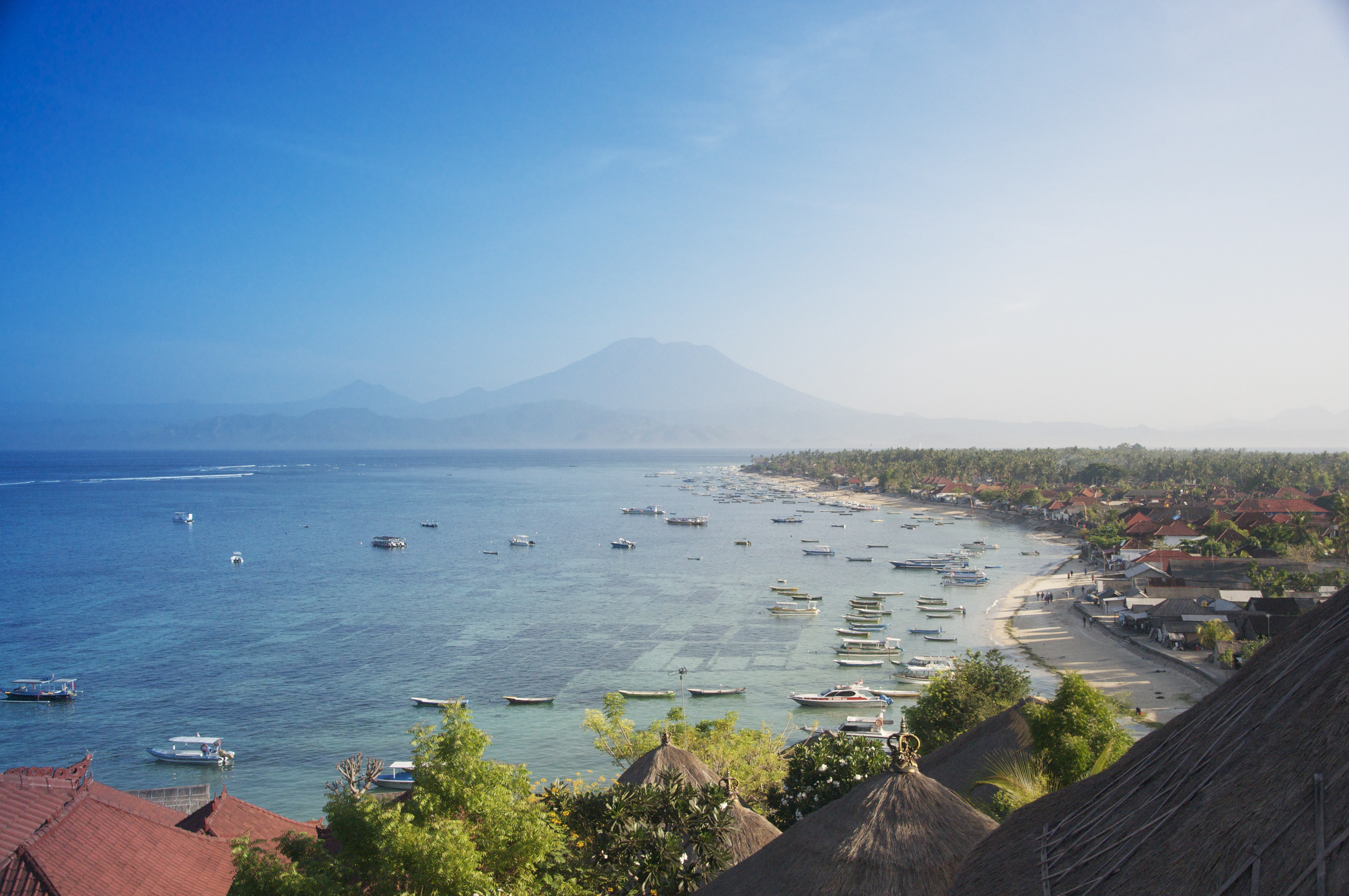
Jungutbatu Village, Nusa Lembongan, showing a view of Mount Agung in the background

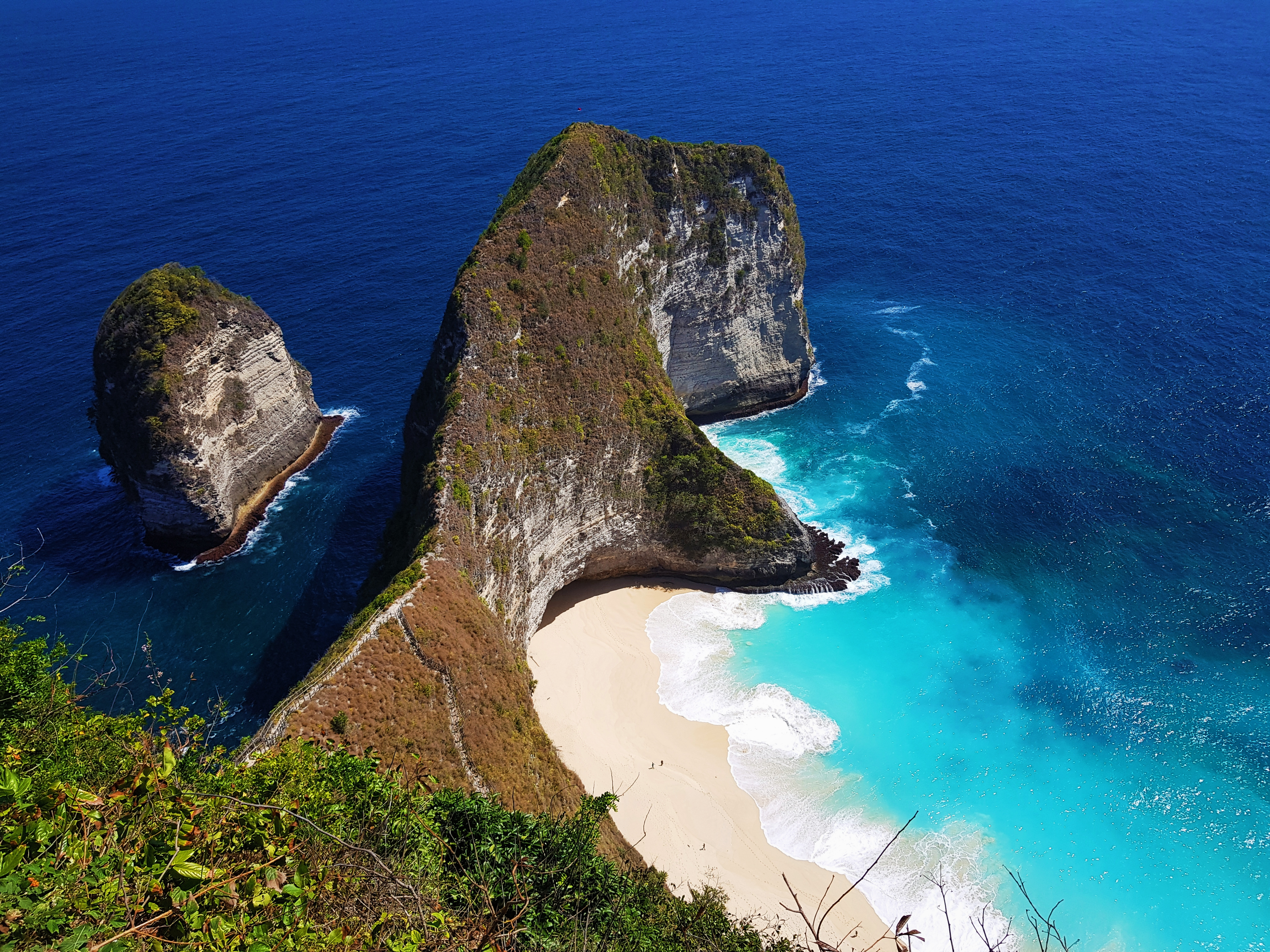
Kelingking Beach, Nusa Penida

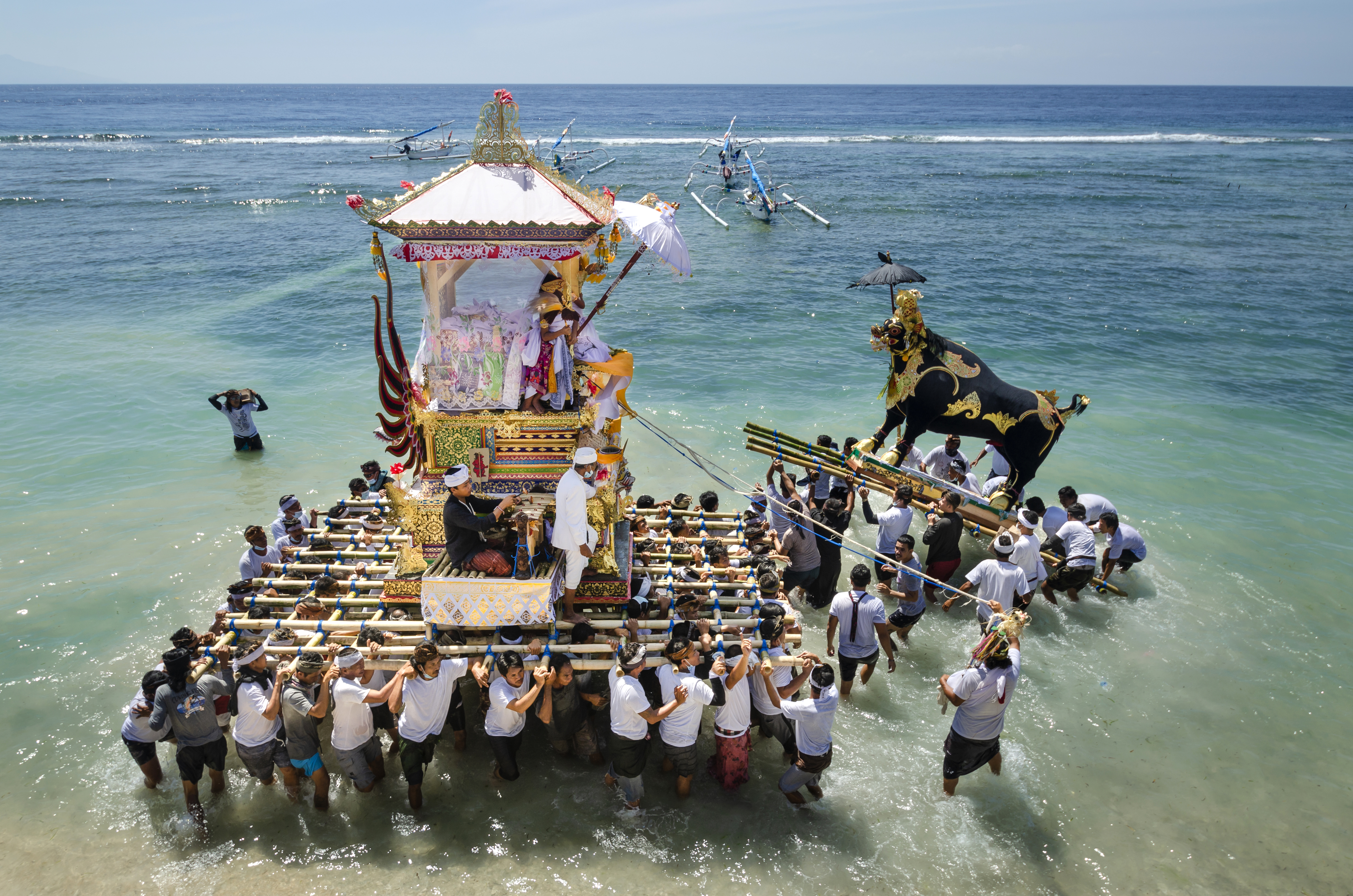
Ngaben ceremony in Nusa Penida

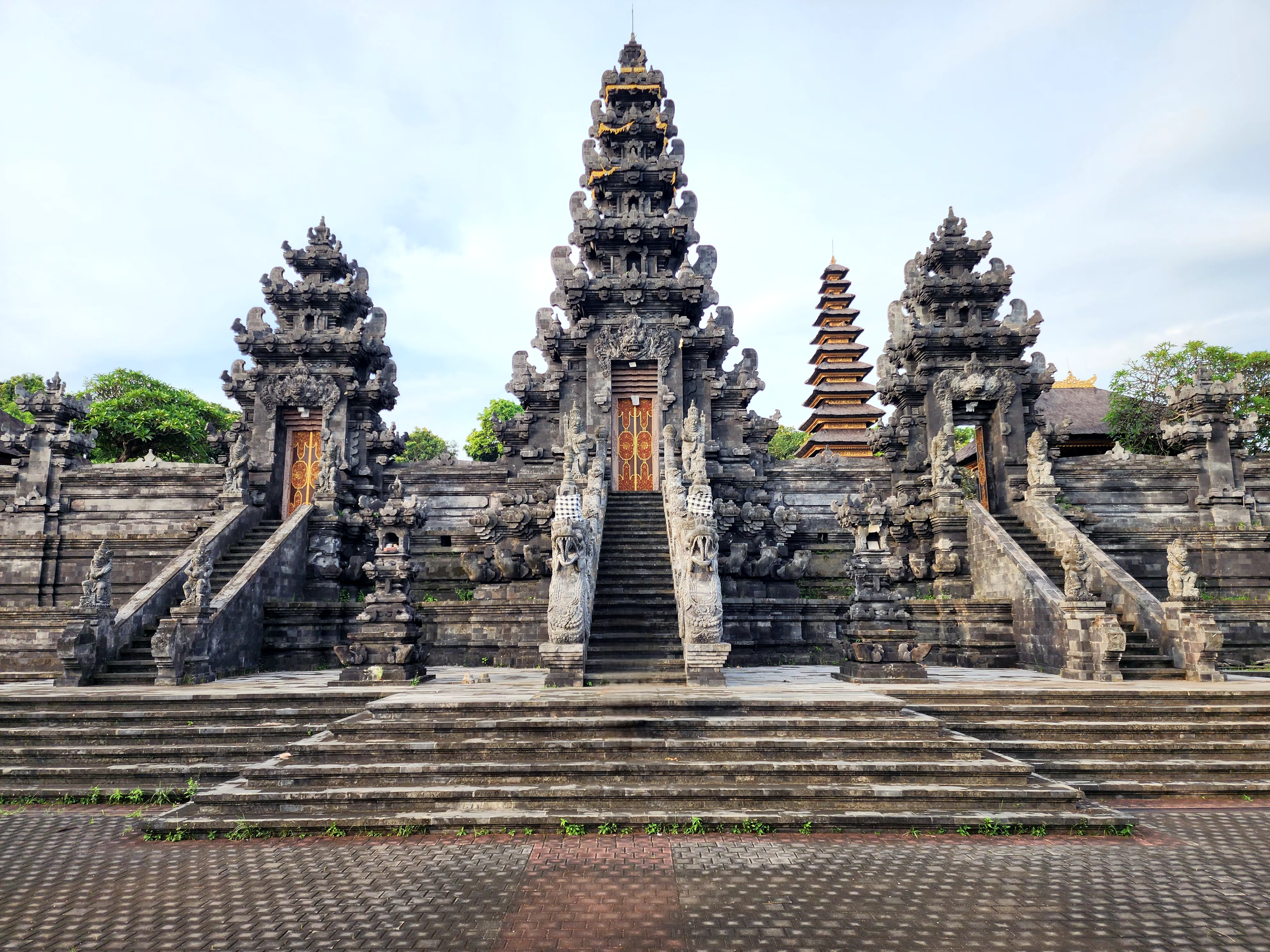
Bukit Buluh Temple

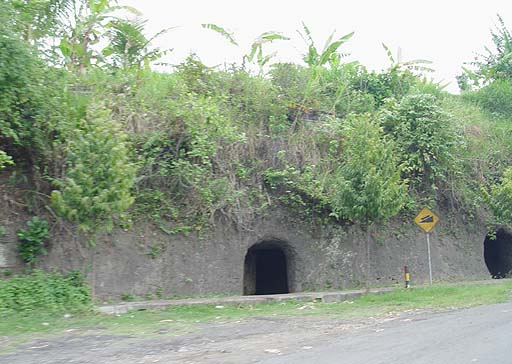
Japanese army shelters, Banjarangkan, Klungkung
