= Pura Goa Lawah =

Balinese Hindu temple in Indonesia

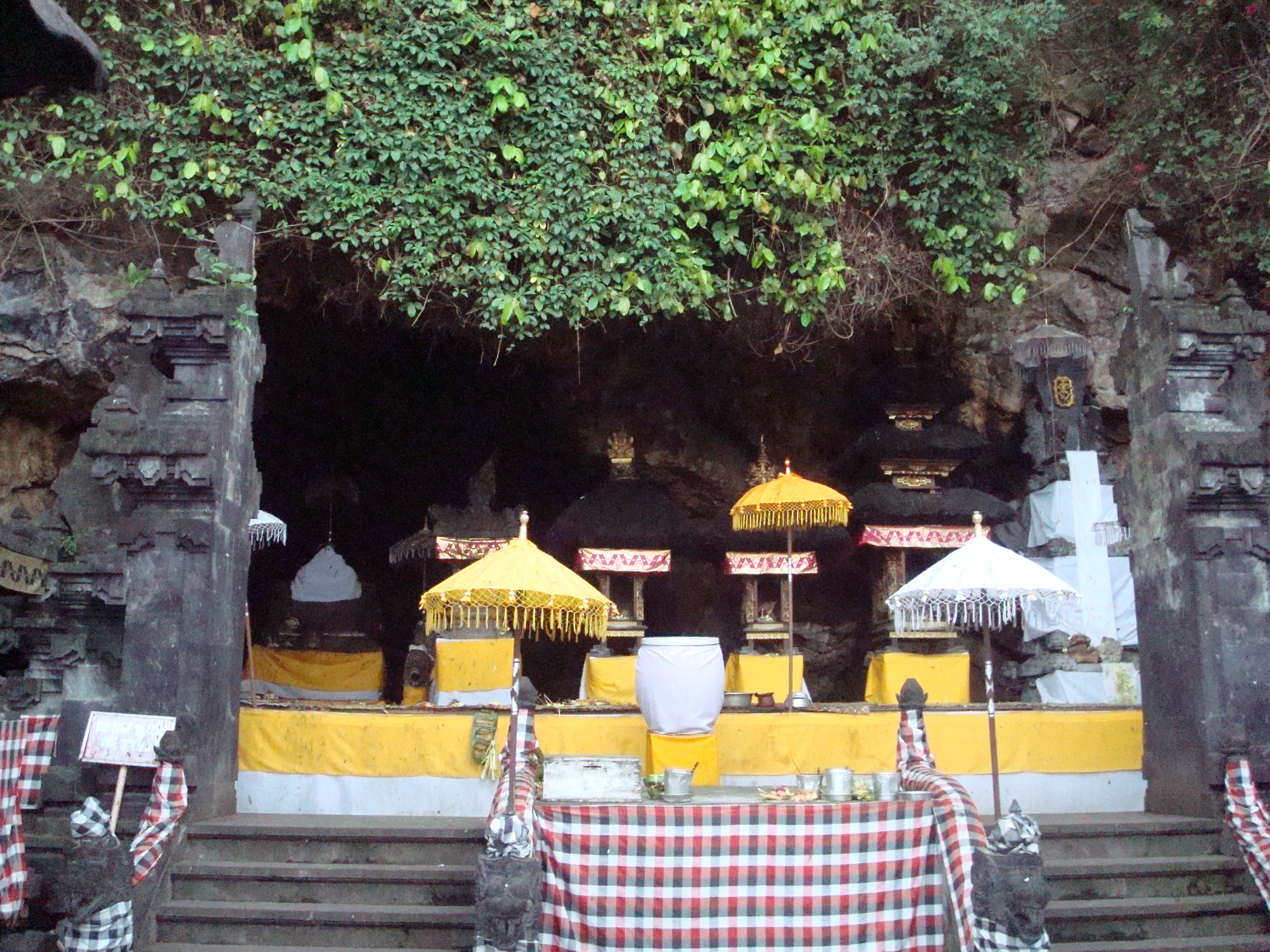
- These small shrines in the inner sanctum of Pura Goa Lawah mark cave's opening.
- Interactive map of the Pura Goa Lawah area

General information
- Type: Pura
- Architectural style: Balinese
- Location: Pesinggahan, Dawan Subdistrict, Klungkung, Bali, Indonesia, Jalan Raya Goa Lawah, Pesinggahan Village, Dawan Subistrict, Klungkung
- Coordinates: 8.551557°S 115.468844°E
- Estimated completion: 11th century

Pura Goa Lawah (Balinese "Bat Cave Temple") is a Balinese Hindu temple or a pura located in Klungkung, Bali, Indonesia. Pura Goa Lawah is often included among the Sad Kahyangan Jagad, or the "six sanctuaries of the world", the six holiest places of worship on Bali. Pura Goa Lawah is noted for being built around the opening of a cave which is inhabited by bats, hence its name, the Goa Lawah or "bat cave".

== Description ==
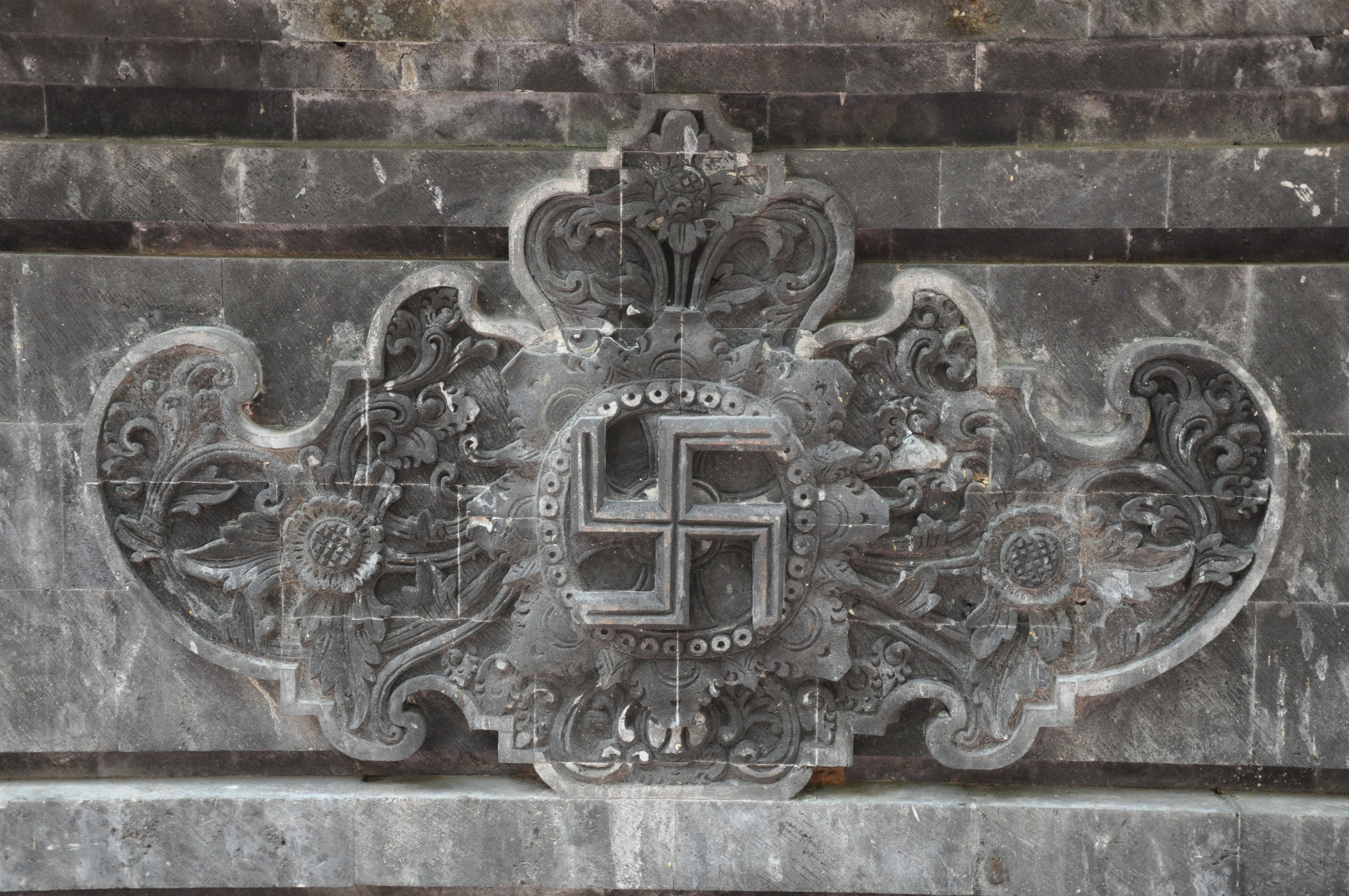
Pura Goa Lawah temple entrance; note the swastika as Hindu symbol.

Pura Goa Lawah is located in the village of Pesinggahan, Klungkung Regency, Bali. The large complex of Pura Goa Lawah is located on the north side of Jalan Raya Goa Lawah main road, on the beach of Goa Lawah.

Pura Goa Lawah is sometimes included among the Sad Kahyangan Jagad, or the "six sanctuaries of the world", the six holiest places of worship on Bali. According to Balinese beliefs, they are the pivotal points of the island and are meant to provide spiritual balance to Bali. The number of these most sacred sanctuaries always adds up six, but depending on the region, the specific temples that are listed may vary.

== History ==
Pura Goa Lawah was established in the 11th century by Mpu Kuturan. Mpu Kuturan was one of the early priests who introduced Hinduism on Bali. The temple complex may start as the center of meditation for priests.

When the Dutch attacked the Klungkung kingdom of 1849 in the War of Kusamba, the temple was one of the key points during the war. The conflict in the War of Kusamba was between the Royal Netherlands East Indies Army led by Andreas Victor Michiels and the Klungkung kingdom led by Dewa Agung Istri Kanya.

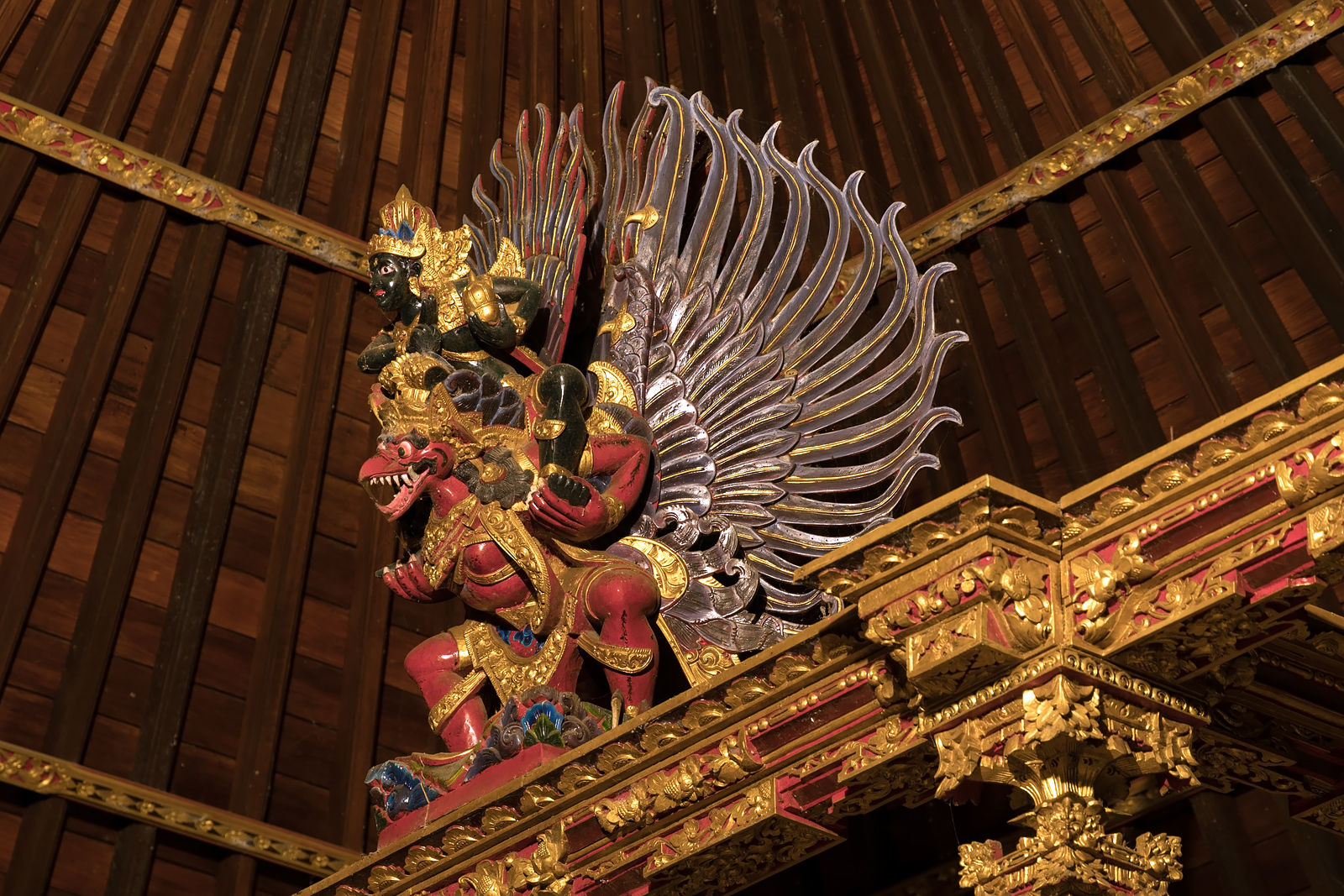
Carving at Pura Goa Lawah

The temple decoration evolved as time progress. In the early 20th-century, porcelain ceramic plates attached into the shrines and gates of Pura Goa Lawah are common. This treatment can still be found in other old temples in Bali such as Pura Kehen. Today, the porcelain ceramic plates decoration on the shrines and gates has been reduced.

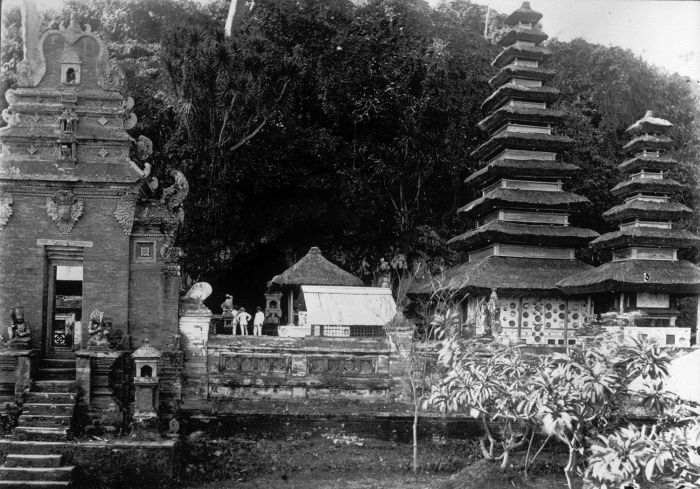
Pura Goa Lawah in early 20th-century, showing porcelain ceramic plates decoration.

== Temple compound ==
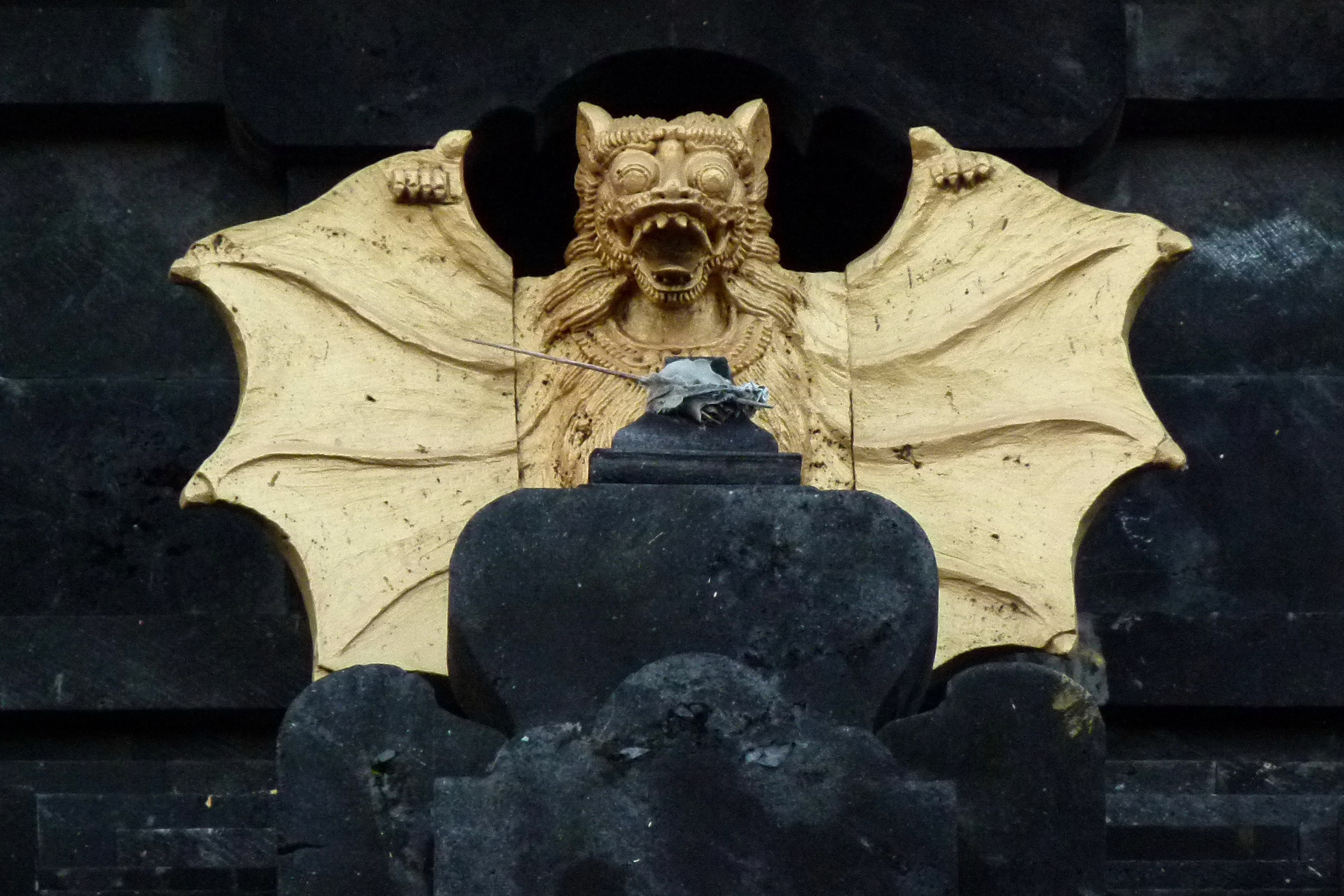
Bat temple ornaments inlaid with gold at Pura Goa Lawah.

The compound of Pura Goa Lawah is built over a hilly outcrop. It is divided into three areas: the outer sanctum of the temple (jaba pisan or nistaning mandala), the middle sanctum (jaba tengah or madya mandala), and the inner main sanctum (jero or utamaning mandala).

The entrance to the temple complex is marked with a candi bentar gate. A bale kulkul (pavilion to keep a drum) is placed to the west of this entrance. Within the first courtyard of the temple, the outer sanctum or the jaba pisan, there are three pavilions (bale) located in three corners of the temple complex. One of the pavilions is the bale gong, where the gamelan set is kept for musical performance. Access to the middle sanctum or jaba tengah is located to the west of the outer sanctum.

Three paduraksa portals mark the entrance to the innermost sanctum of the temple (jero). The inner main sanctum consists of three meru towers, one of which is dedicated to Shiva. Several smaller shrines are nested into a cave, where hordes of nectar bats rest. The entrance to the mouth of the cave is marked with the candi bentar gates. Another shrine is a bale pavilion adorned with motifs of Naga Basuki flanking its steps. Naga Basuki is a primordial dragon who is believed to keep the balance of the cosmos.

== See also ==
- Balinese temple

== Cited works ==
- Auger, Timothy, ed. (2001). Bali & Lombok. Eyewitness Travel Guides. London: Dorling Kindersley. ISBN 0751368709.
- Stuart-Fox, David (1999). Fox, James J. (ed.). Religion and Ritual: Balinese Hindu Temples. Indonesian Heritage. Singapore: Archipelago Press. ISBN 9813018585.
- Vickers, A. (1989). Bali: A Paradise Created. Tuttle Publishing. ISBN 978-1-4629-0008-4.
