= Banjarangkan =

District in Klungkung Regency, Bali Province, Indonesia

Banjarangkan is a district of Klungkung Regency, Bali, Indonesia. It is located 6 km west of Semarapura, the regency capital, or about one hour from Denpasar. Its area is approximately 45.73 km^{2}, and it had a population of 37,115 at the 2010 Census and 44,431 at the 2020 Census; the official estimate as at mid 2024 was 47,140.

Location withn Klungkung Regency

Subdivisions of Banjarangkan consist of 13 villages (all classed as rural desa), subdivided in turn into 55 dusun and 26 traditional villages (desa adat).

== Places of interest ==
Places of interest in Banjarangkan include Pura Kentel Gumi, Tegal Besar beach and Lepang, a beach with black sand and a view of Nusa Penida Island, where turtles can be seen to lay eggs.

The village of Tihingan, 4 km north-east of Banjarangkan, is famous for its gong-making smiths (pande gong), historically tied to the Gelgel kingdom and later to the Klungkung kingdom (in the same way that the painters from the village of Kamasan were linked to these courts). Many house fronts bear a sign for 'pande gong' or 'gong maker' and these houses are partially converted into workshops and warehouses. The metal plates used to make the gongs are usually smelted there, but the gongs are shaped by a team of around five workers in a large, open-spaced and tin-roofed forge between bush and farmland. These instruments are used in gamelan orchestras.
