= Ngaben =

Cremation ceremony of Hindu people in Bali, Indonesia

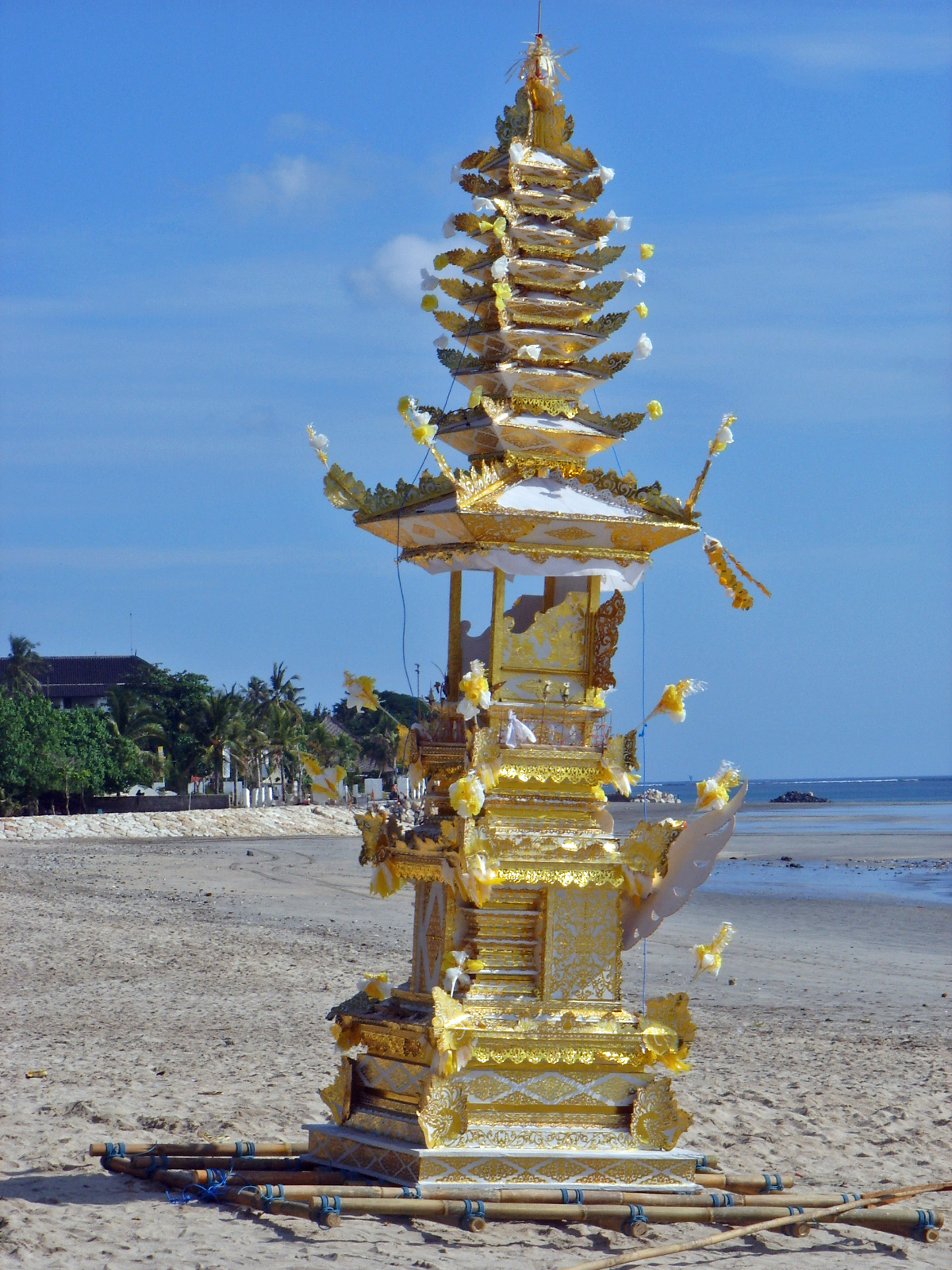
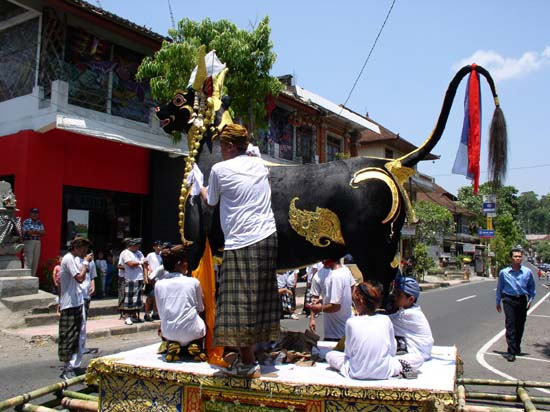
Left: A wadah cremation tower for Ngaben; Right: A lembu cremation bull.

Ngaben, also known as Pitra Yadnya, Pelebon or cremation ceremony, is the Hindu funeral ritual of Bali, Indonesia. A Ngaben is performed to release the soul of a dead person so that it can enter the upper realm where it can wait for it to be reborn or become liberated from the cycles of rebirths. The Balinese Hindu theology holds that there is a competition between evil residents of the lower realm to capture this soul, and a proper cremation enhances the chance that it may reach the upper realm.

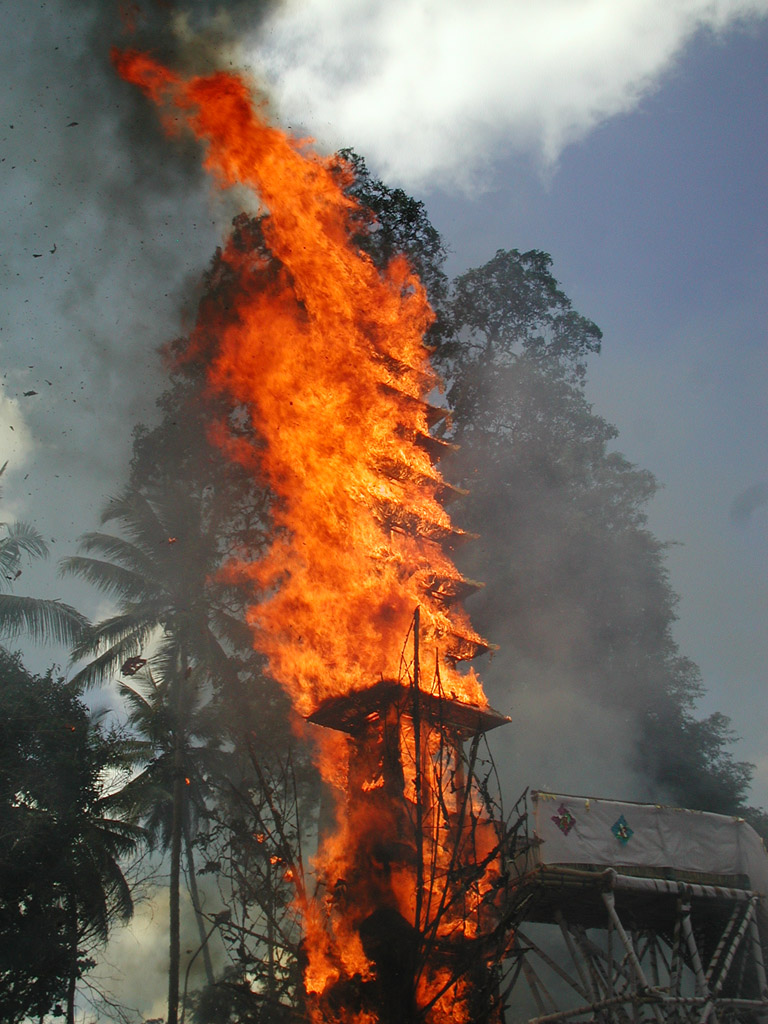
Ngaben cremation

Cremation parade in Bedulu, Bali, Indonesia.

A quick Ngaben is preferred, but usually too expensive. In Balinese culture, people go through an interim state where they bury the dead for a while usually near Pura Prajapati, pool funds and cremate many recently dead on the same day in an elaborate community-based Ngaben ceremony. Once the families are financially ready, they select an auspicious day, make bade (coffins) to carry the dead, and announce the event in the village. The families also make a patulangan to cremate the body in, which is either a lembu (bull or mythical animal-shaped bamboo-wood-paper coffin) to burn with the dead, or a wooden wadah (temple-like structure). Once the corpse is ready for the cremation ground, it is washed, dressed in Balinese attire, family and friends pay their last goodbye with prayers and the mourners take it for cremation. They carry the corpses with rites, dressed in traditional attire, accompanied with gamelan music and singing, to the kuburan (cremation grounds). If the path passes through major road crossings, the coffin is rotated three times to confuse the evil residents of the lower realm.

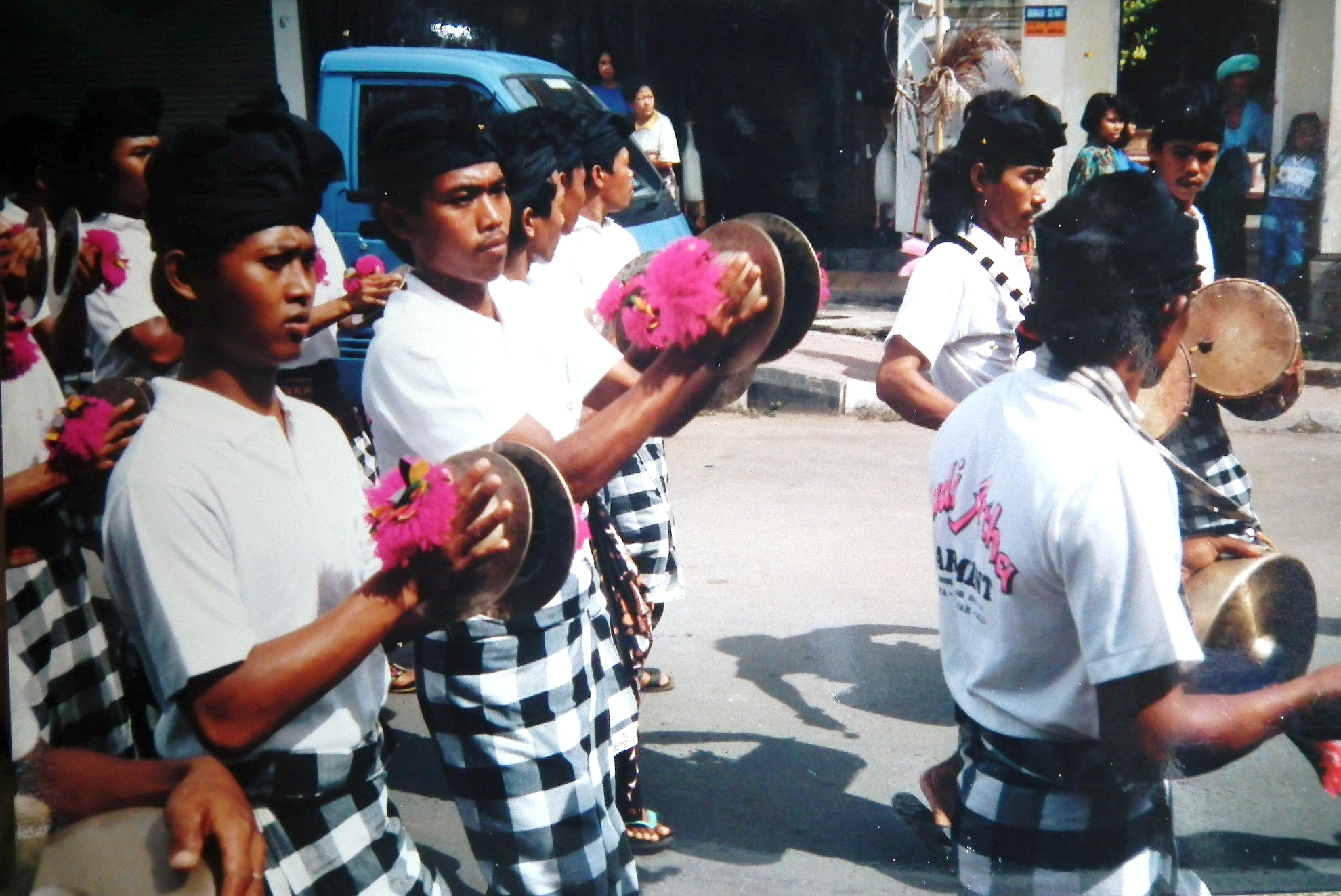
Funeral music during Ngaben, Bali

At the cremation ground, the corpse is placed into the bull-shaped lembu or temple-shaped wadah, final hymns are recited and the cremation pyre lit. While the corpse burns, the Balinese music team plays the beleganjur music, a battle song symbolizing the soul's fight with evil underworld to reach the worry-free upper realm. Twelve days after the cremation, the families collect the ashes, fill it inside coconut shell, carry it to nearby ocean or sea to return the remains back to the elements.

== See also ==
- Antyesti
- Sanskara (rite of passage)
