= Kamasan =

Village on Bali, Indonesia

Pre-1920 Kamasan Palindon Painting detail, an example of Kamasan-style classical painting

Kamasan is a village on Bali, Indonesia. It is known for a style of painting named after it and has a cultural importance on a Bali-wide level.

== Situation ==
Kamasan is located just next to Semarapura (north-west) and to Gelgel (south), in the Klungkung regency, between the south-east coast and the mountain range of Gunung Agung. Denpasar is 31 km south-west.

Administratively, it is part of Gelgel territory.

== Population ==
In 2014 its population was about 4,000 people.

== Painting: Kamasan wayang style ==
The various 'traditional' styles of painting on modern Bali are derived from the "Kamasan wayang style", or Kamasan shadow puppet painting, which in turn takes it patterns from ancient Java.

Kamasan wayang painting is a 2-dimensional painting depicting shadow puppet performances. It has been listed as Intangible Cultural Heritage (WBTB) in 2015 by the Indonesian Government. It was proposed to Unesco for registration as Intangible cultural heritage in 2018 and 2022.

Historically, artists from Kamasan were used by the many raja courts that existed on Bali up to the early twentieth century. Some became known with the emergence of the kingdom of Klungkung and its palace, which replaced the kingdom of Gelgel at the end of the 17th century; for others, this started earlier, in the 16th century. However, the name of Kamasan is mentioned as early as 1072 AD (Saka year 994), during the reign of Bali king Anak Wungsu.

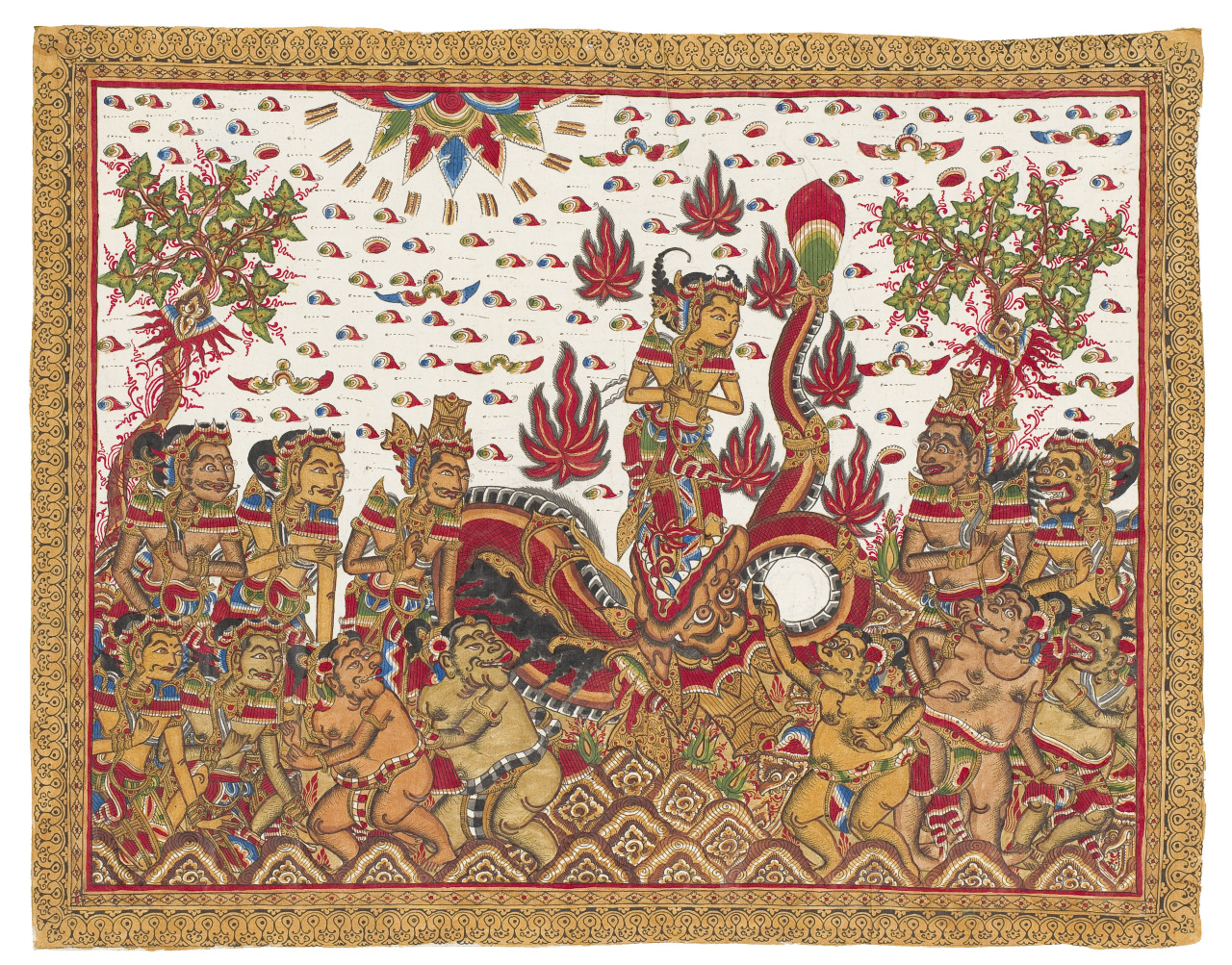
Scene from Kakawin Sutasoma

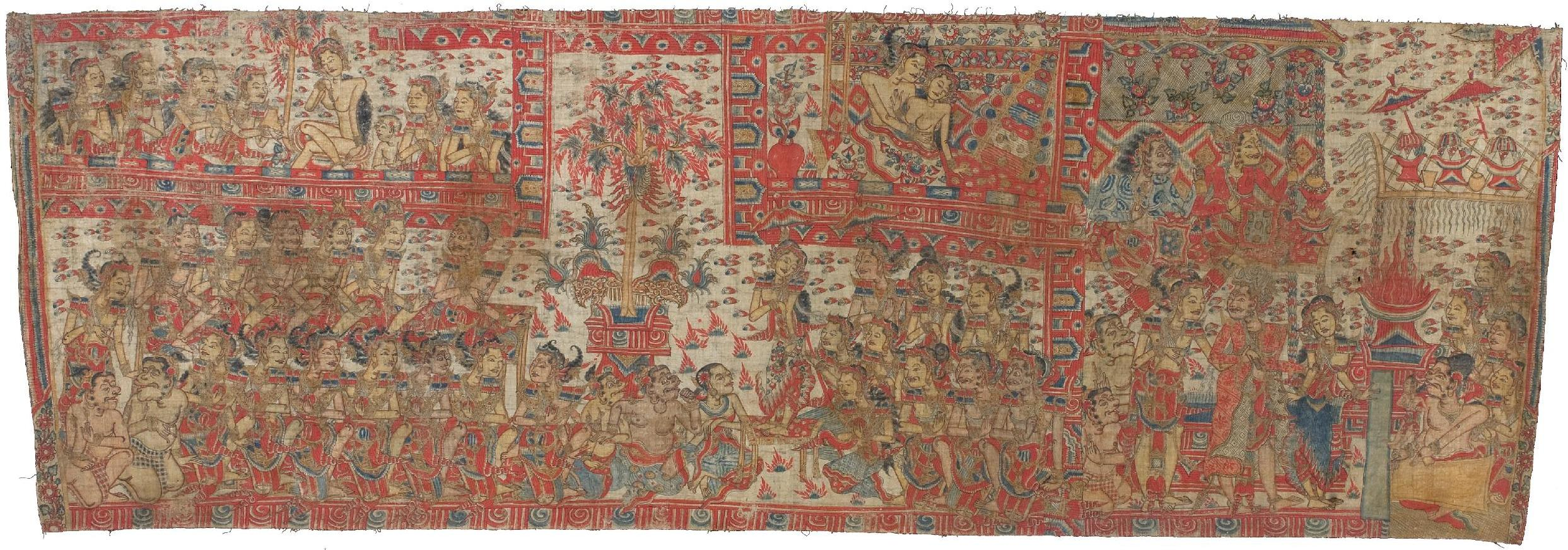
Scenes from Kakawin Sumanasantaka

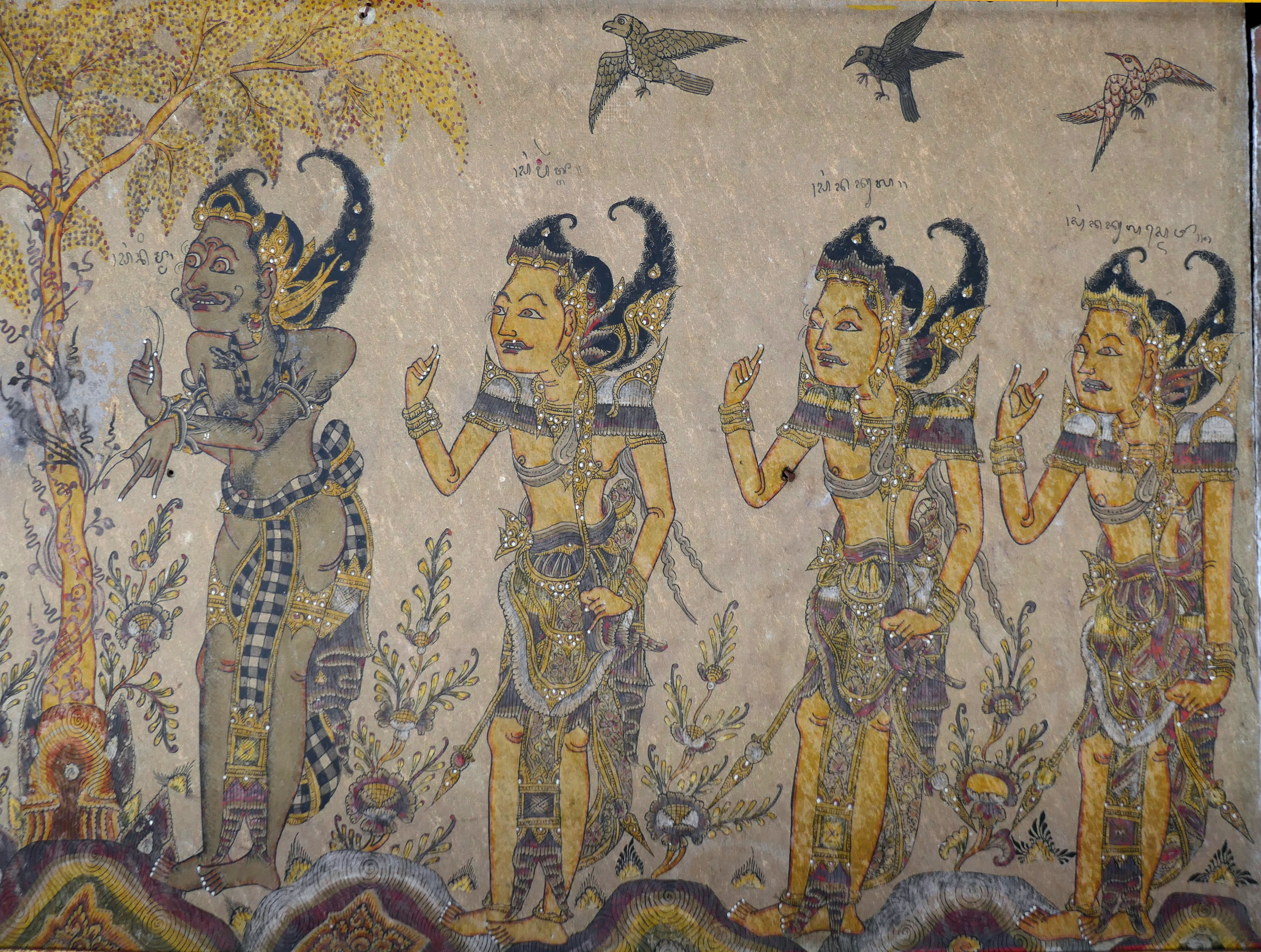
Scene from Bhimaswarga showing Bhima and his brothers, in the Kertha Gosa Pavilion, Semarapura.

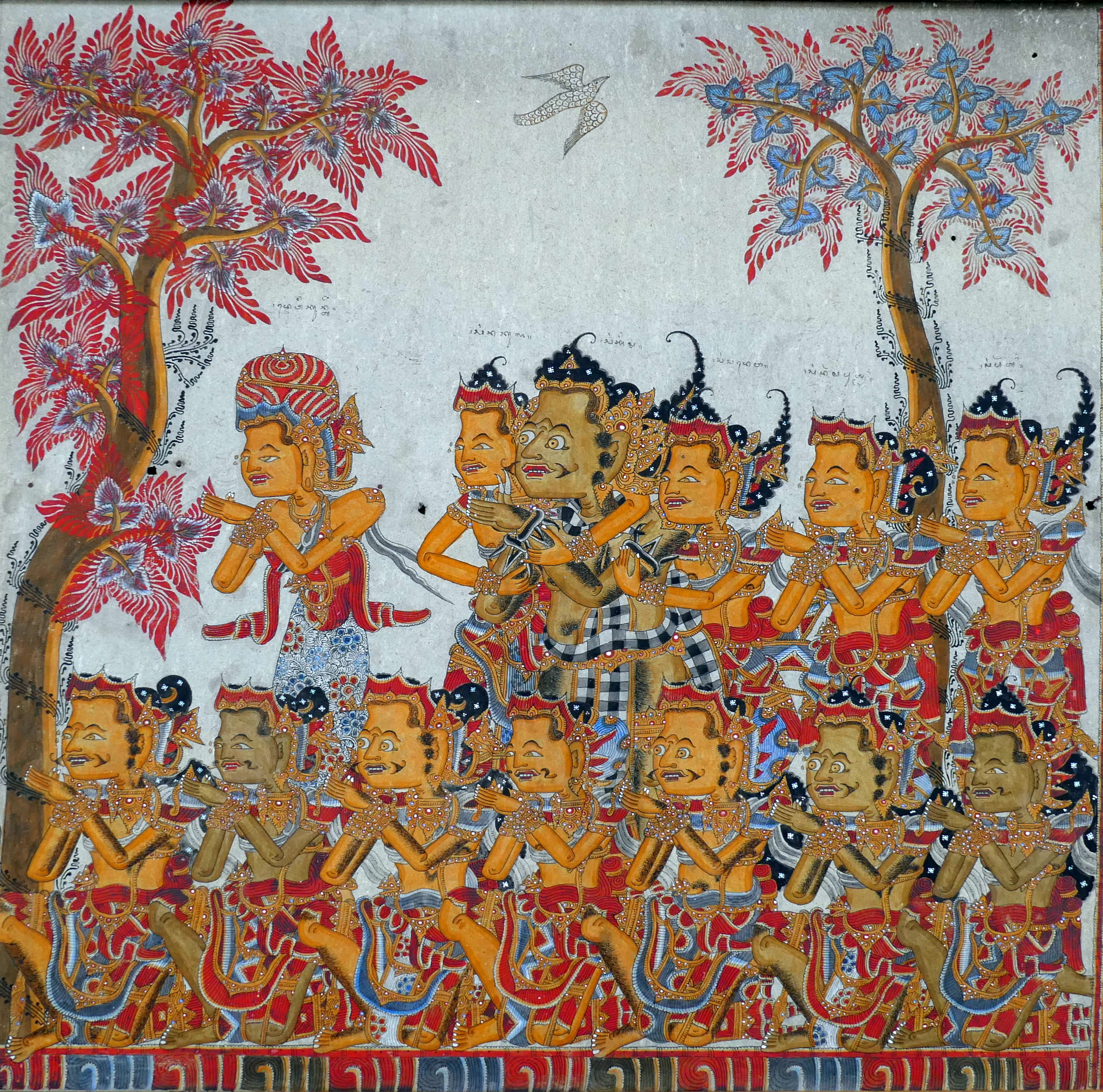
Scene from Bhimaswarga in the Kertha Gosa Pavilion, Semarapura.

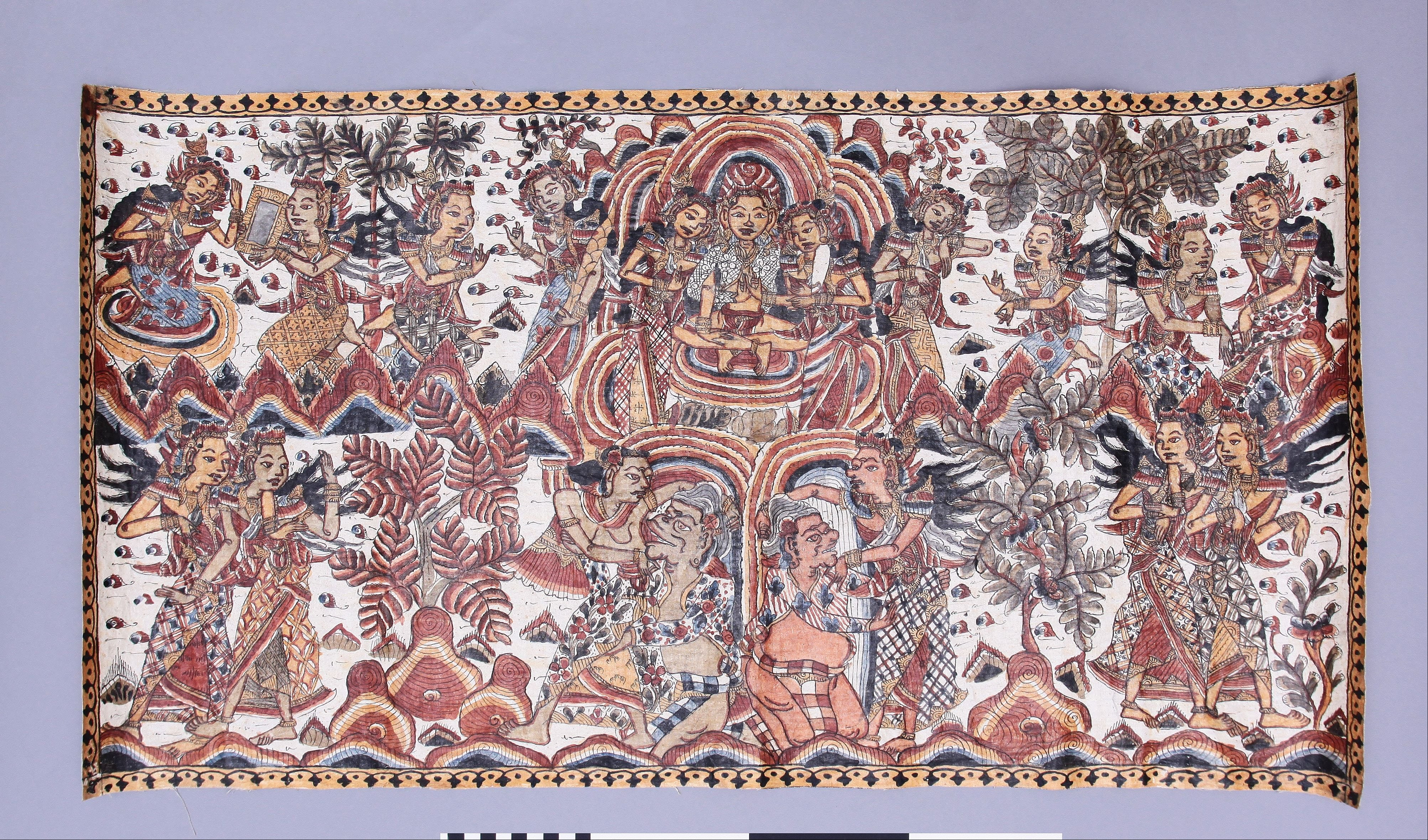
Scenes from Arjunawiwaha

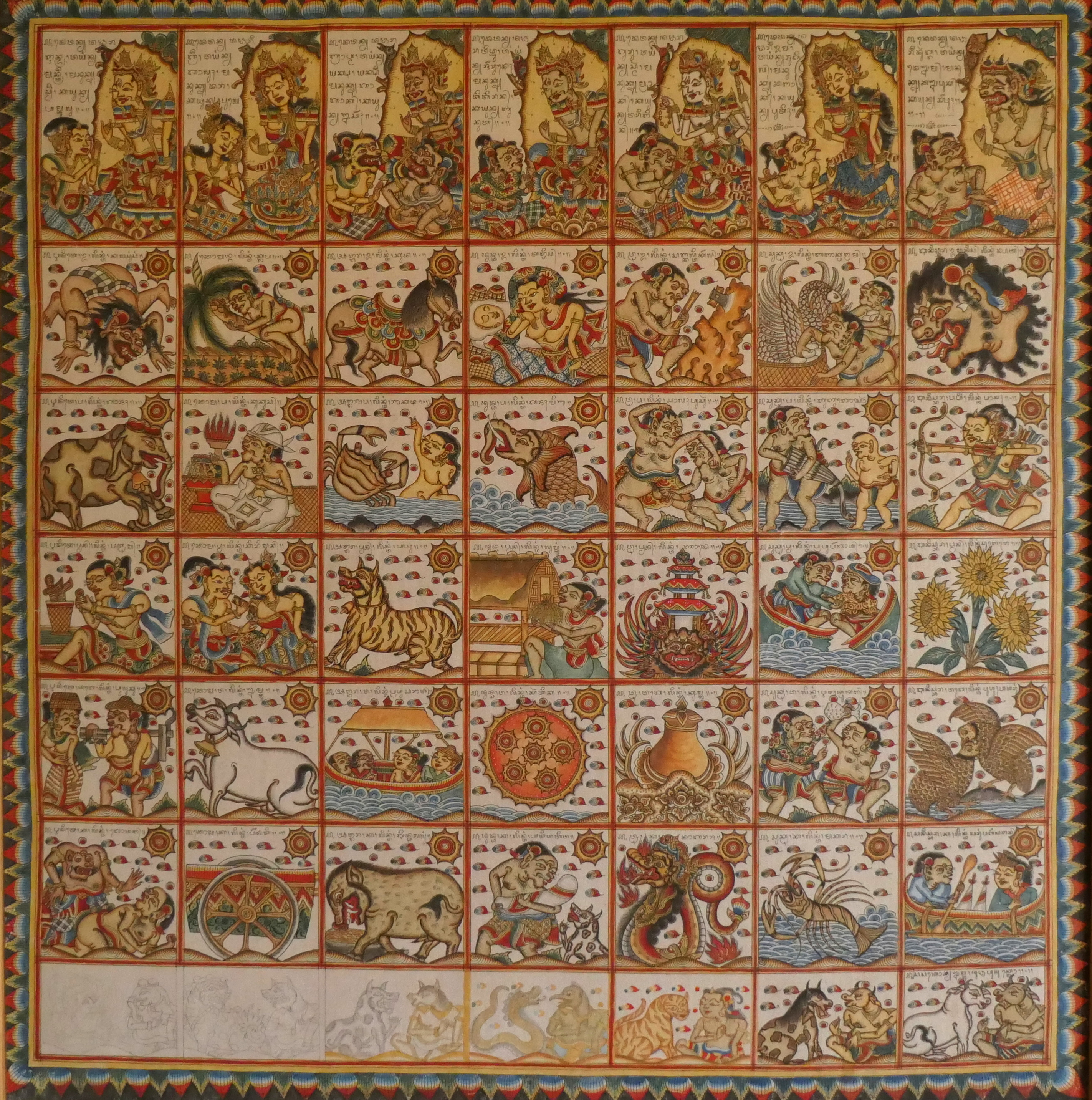
Astrological Chart by I Nyoman Arcana, in the collection of Neka Art Museum, Ubud.

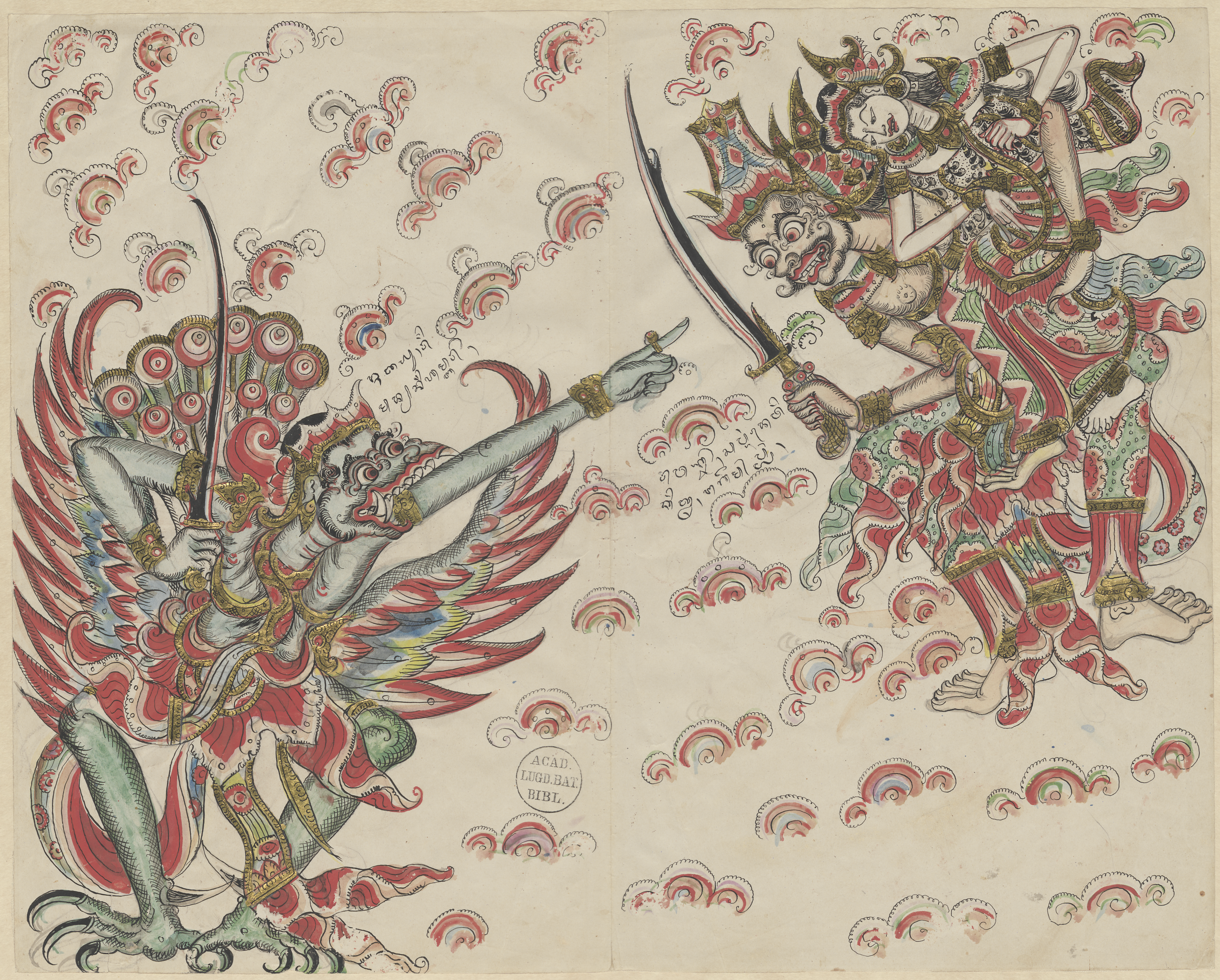
Scene from Ramayana, Jatayu fighting Ravana who is abducting Sita, by I Ketut Gedé

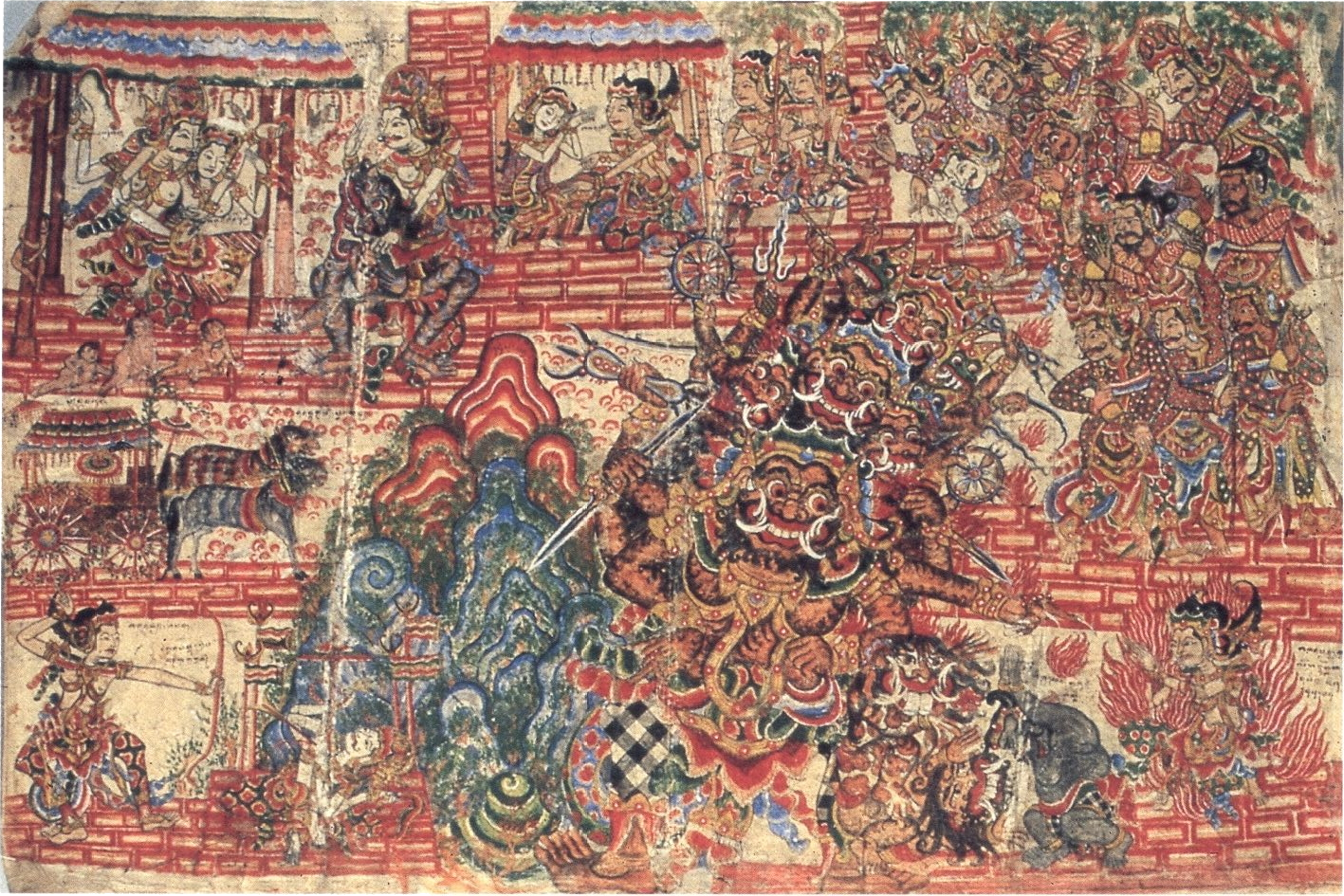
Scenes from Smaradahana, by I Ketut Gedé

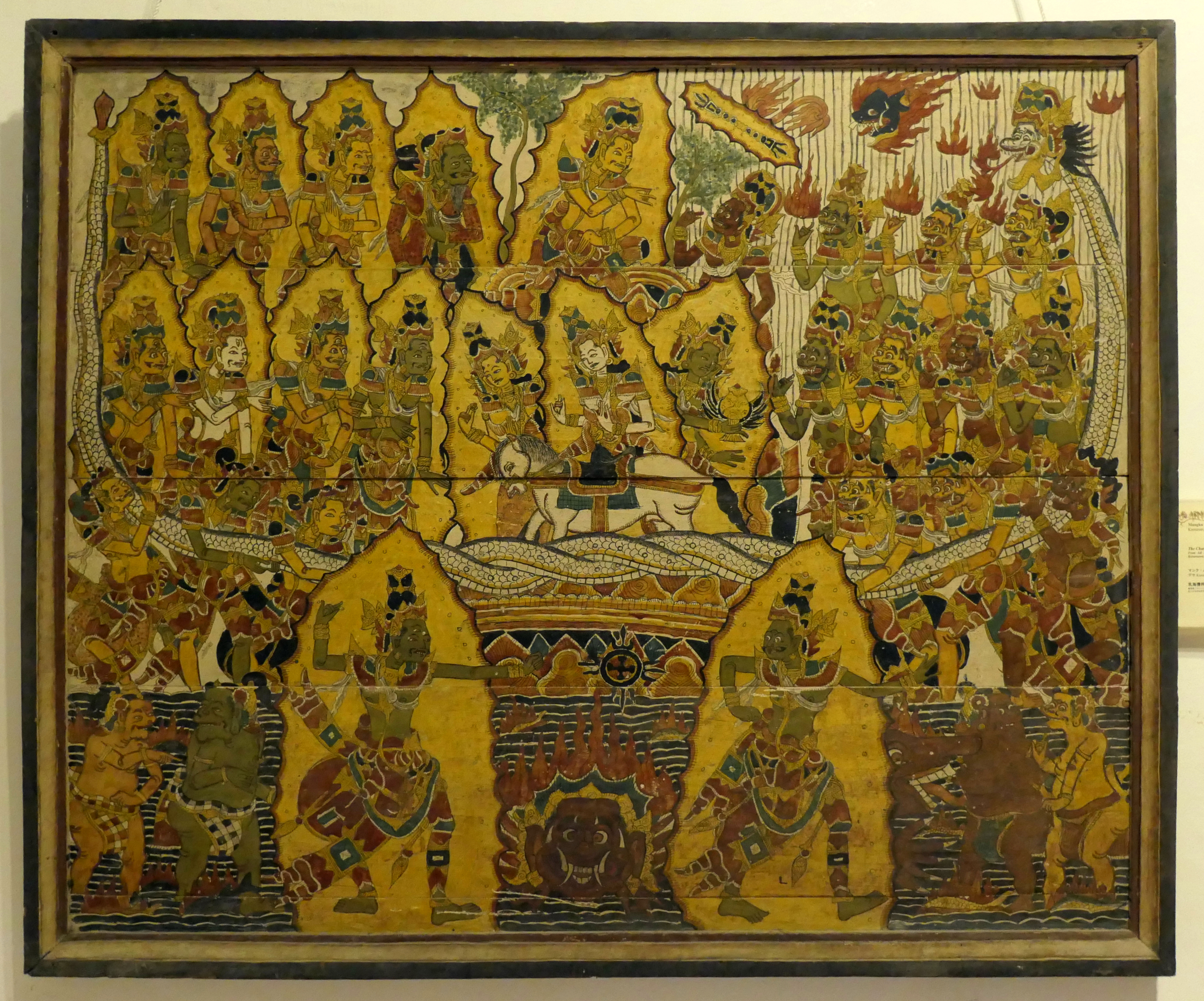
The Churning of the Milky Ocean, scene from Adiparva, the first book of Mahabharata, by Mangku Mura

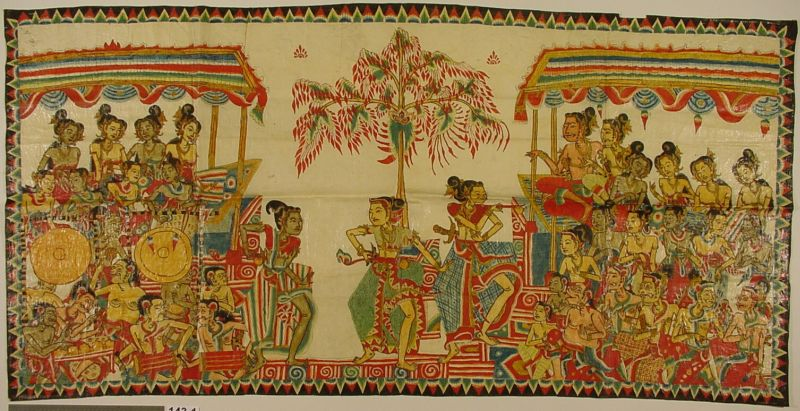
unknown narrative

== Other arts ==
The village also provided gold- and silversmiths, dancers, musicians and puppeteers. The painters have a particular ward in Kamasan, the Banjar Sangging. The smiths are located in another ward, the Banjar Pande Mas.

== See also ==
=== Wikipedia articles ===
- Indonesian art
- Culture of Indonesia

=== Bibliography ===
- Campbell, Siobhan (October 2011). "Global Kamasan". Jurnal Kajian Bali. 1 (2): 1–33.
- Campbell, Siobhan (2014). "Kamasan Art in Museum Collections. 'Entangled' Histories of Art Collecting in Bali". Bijdragen tot de Taal-, Land- en Volkenkunde. 170: 250–280. doi:10.1163/22134379-17002001.
- Supir, Ketut; Sadia, I Wayan; Muderawan, I Wayan (July 2019). "Uang Kepeng in the Globalization Era: Industrialization at Kamasan Village, Klungkung, Bali". Jurnal Bisnis Dan Kewirausahaan. 15 (2): 65–74. doi:10.31940/jbk.v15i2.1409.
