= Wayang style =

Wayang style is a style of puppetry influenced by the Indonesian wayang kulit, in which human figures and those that are supernatural are depicted as flat and very two-dimensional - hence the name wayang, meaning "shadow"). This style was commonly used in East Java during the Majapahit Empire, which lasted from about 1293 AD to around 1500 AD.

How the images are depicted may vary slightly but should in fact meet some if not all of a set standard. Such criteria would include the representation of characters by way of the form of the figures, their decorations and the gestures they are displaying. These conditions are the same that are followed when creating the wayang kulits. For instance, the proportions of the puppets, the style of their costumes, and the intricate detailing must adhere to traditional guidelines to preserve cultural authenticity and ensure that the characters are easily recognizable. As characters where developed they were infused with symbolism that were used to project who they are, by both their appearance and their character as an individual. For example, shadow puppets of Krishna are designed with his figure looking straight forward as symbol of bravery. It is safe to assume that other figures that are depicted looking straight ahead are believed to be brave in character. The decoration of a figure also says a lot about them. Characters that have little decoration are perceived as being more refined and those that are garishly decorated are considered to be less refined.

Examples of wayang style can be seen in relief sculptures and in paintings. The relief sculptures at the Candi Jago in East Java are narratives of the Mahabharata and are good examples of wayang style. Throughout the relief the background imagery is very dynamic with the suggestion of depth. However, the focal points which are the figures are very static and flat in comparison to the rest of the relief sculpture. A fine example of it is displayed in two remaining pavilions of the Klungkung Palace in the Klungkung region of Bali, where the Kertha Gosa Pavilion shows a series of painted murals in the wayang style organised in nine levels; and the Bale Kambang pavilion next to it also bears paintings in the same style arranged on six levels. The relation of the imagery and the wayang kulit are seen more clearly thanks to the use of color. The flat figures of the mural are given life and a sense of character through the use of decorative patterning and color, which are the same or similar to those used when these mythological and religious characters where translated into wayang kulit.

== See also ==
=== Bibliography ===
- Holt, Claire (1967). Art in Indonesia : continuities and change. Ithaca, N.Y.: : Cornell University Press. ISBN 0-8014-0188-7.
