= I Ketut Gedé =

Balinese painter

I Ketut Gedé was a Balinese painter from the village of Singaraja, active at the end of the 19th century.

== Works ==
He is best known for his illustrations of mythological Hindu tales such as the Ramayana.

He produced numerous paintings for Herman Neubronner van der Tuuk in the 1880s and 1890s, and from 1905 onwards for W. O. J. Nieuwenkamp, who considered him to be the best classical painter of his time.

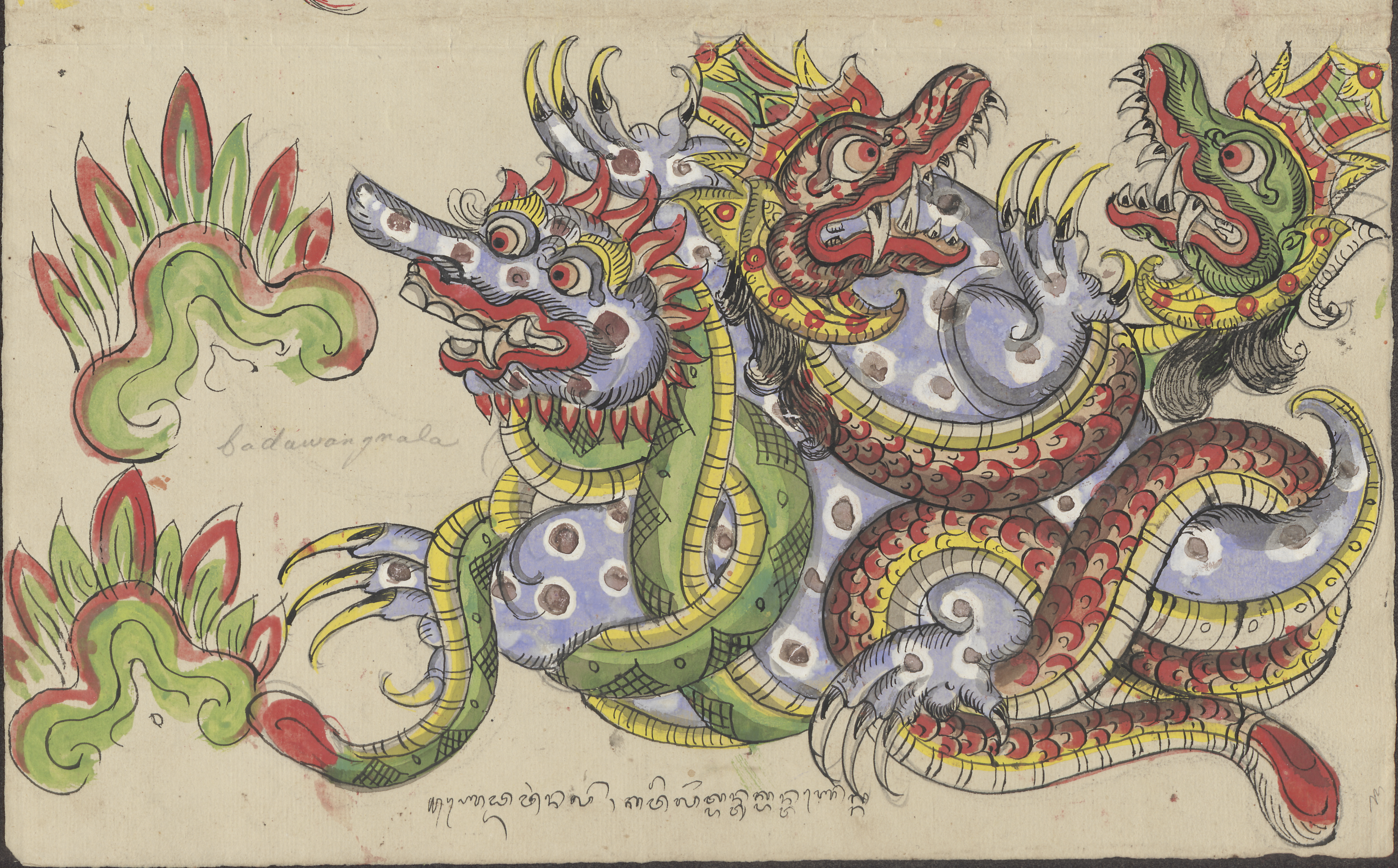
Bedawang Nala, the mythical turtle carrying the world.

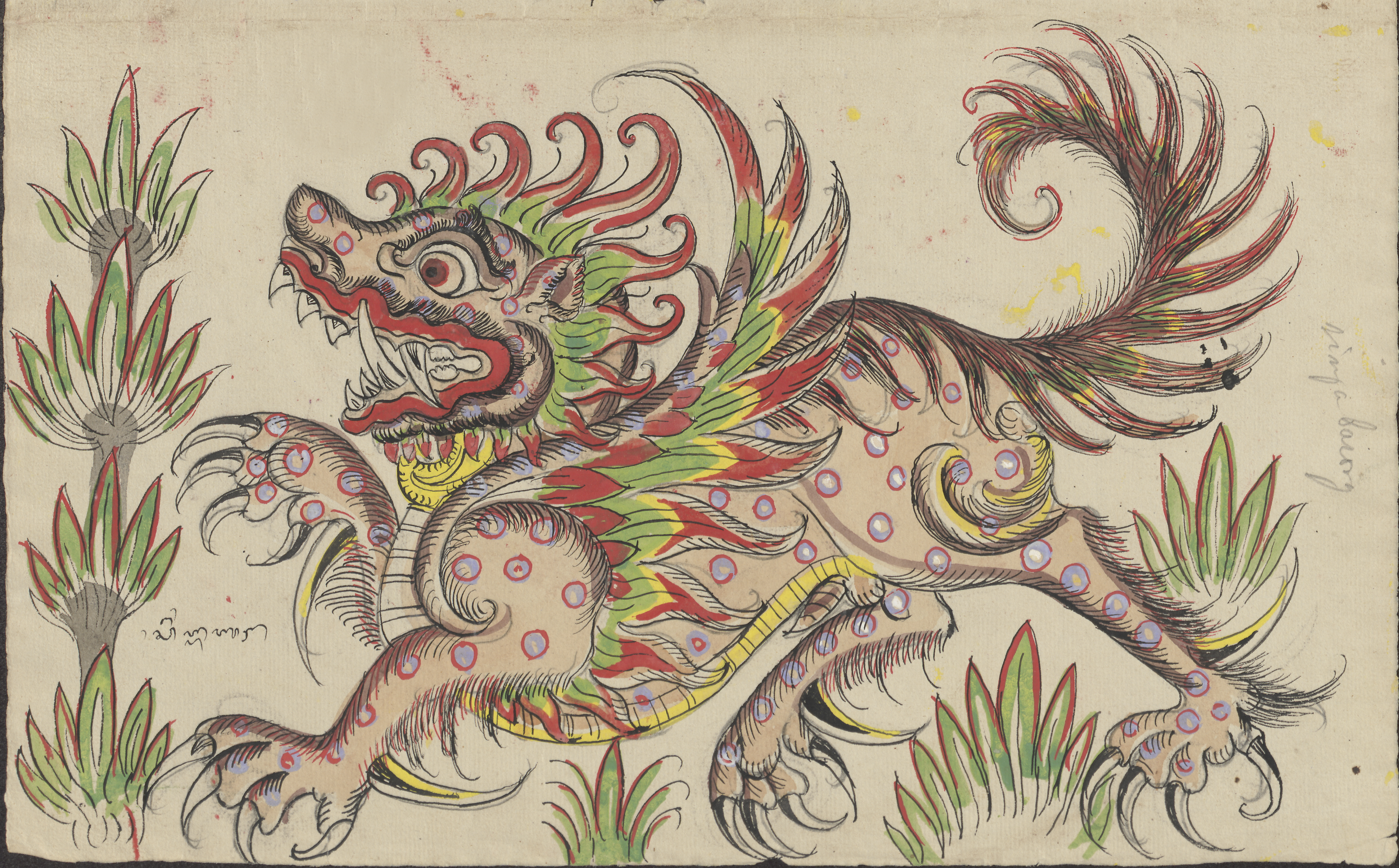
Singa Barwang, a winged lion.

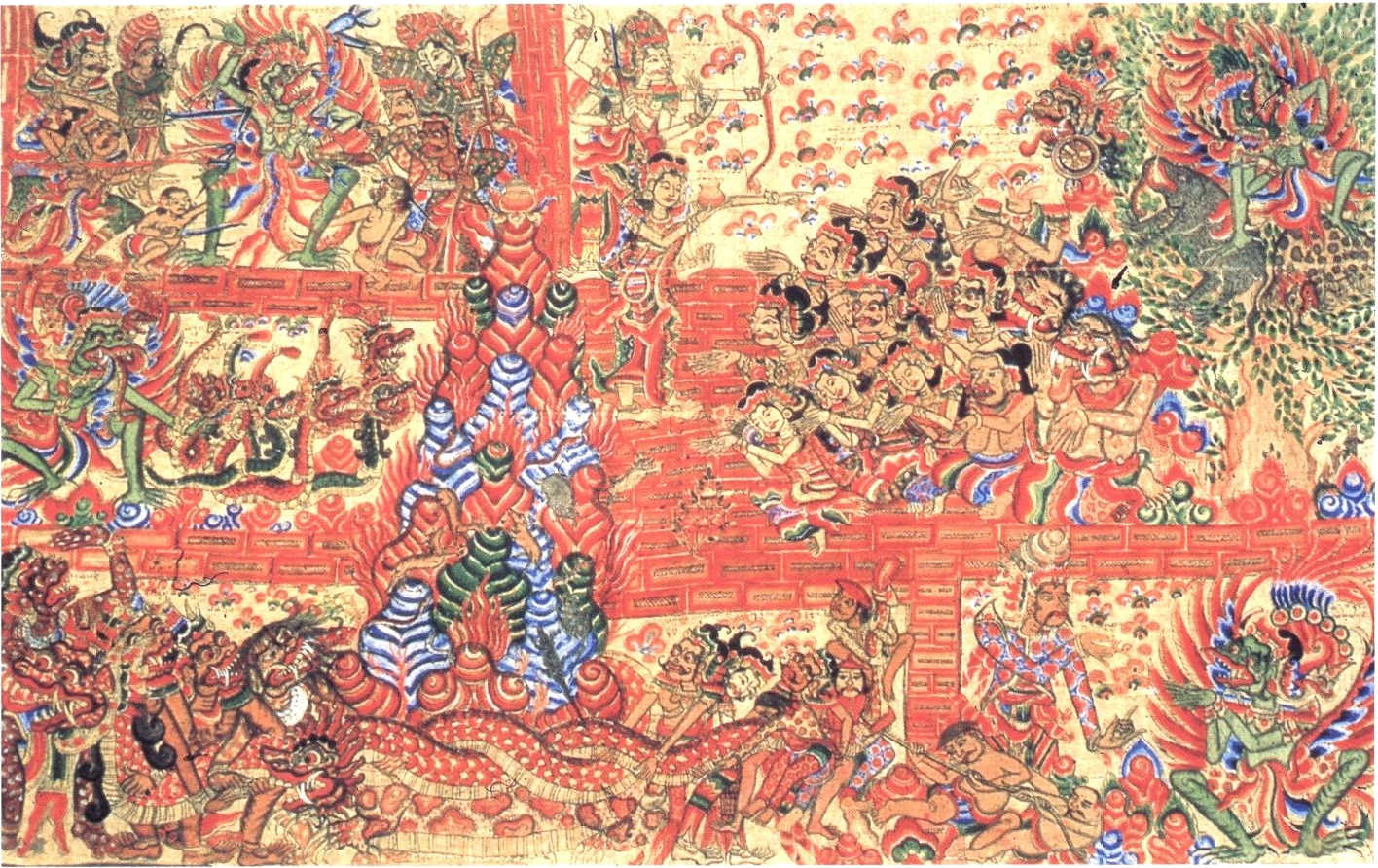
Scene from the Adi Parva, first book of the Mahabharata.

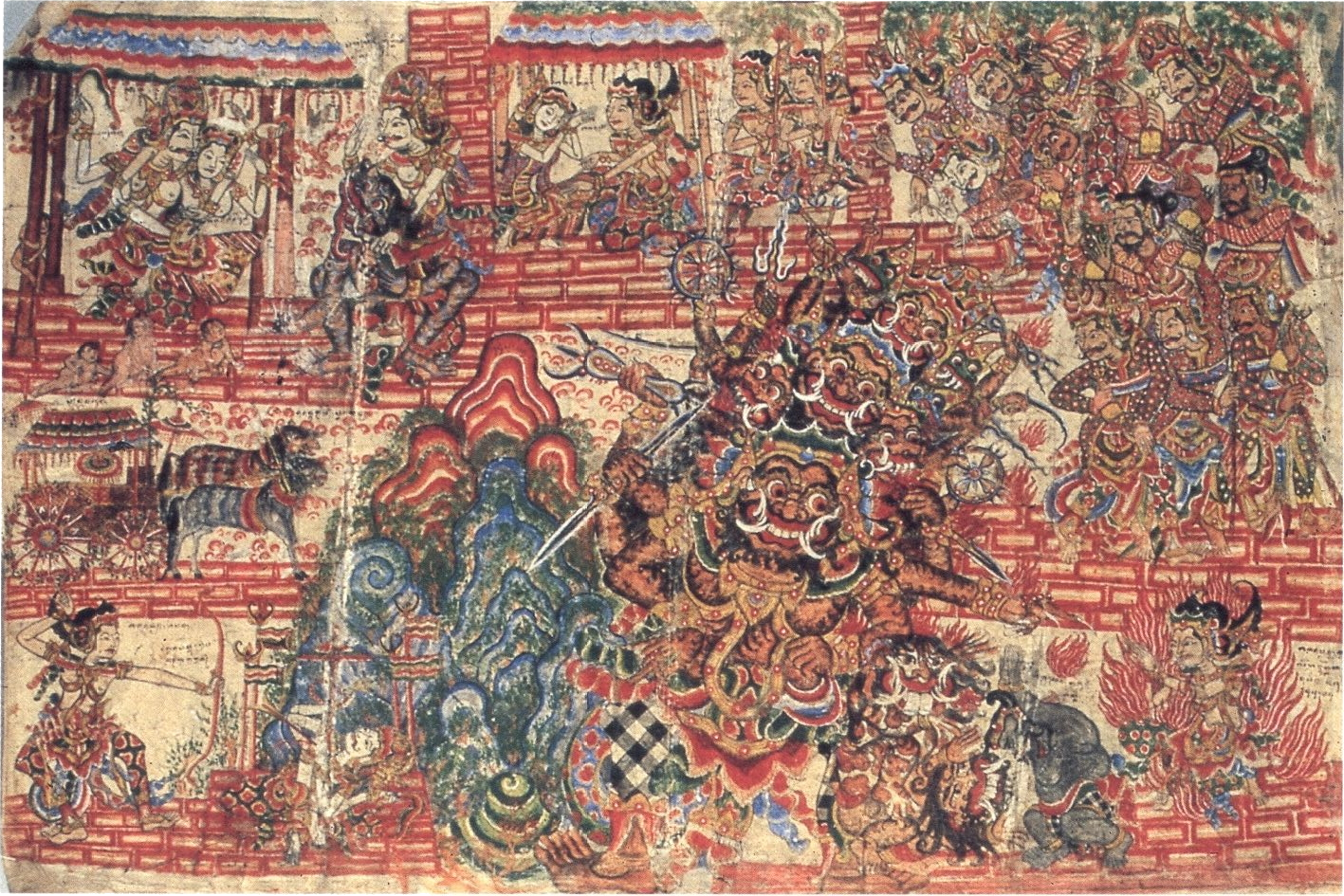
Scene from the Smaradahana, poem in Kawi.

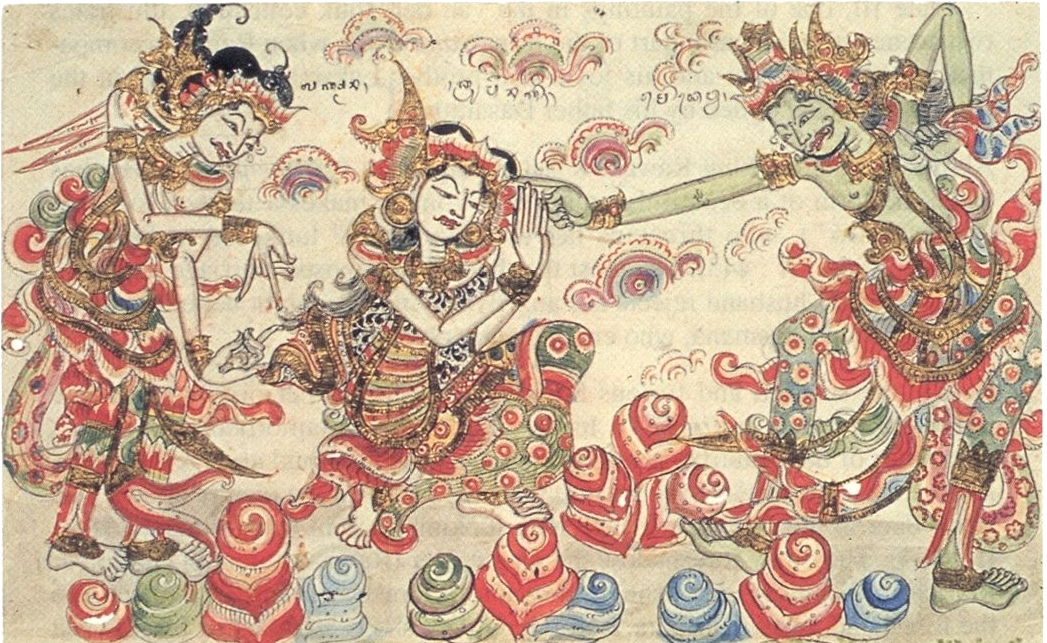
Scene from the Ramayana.

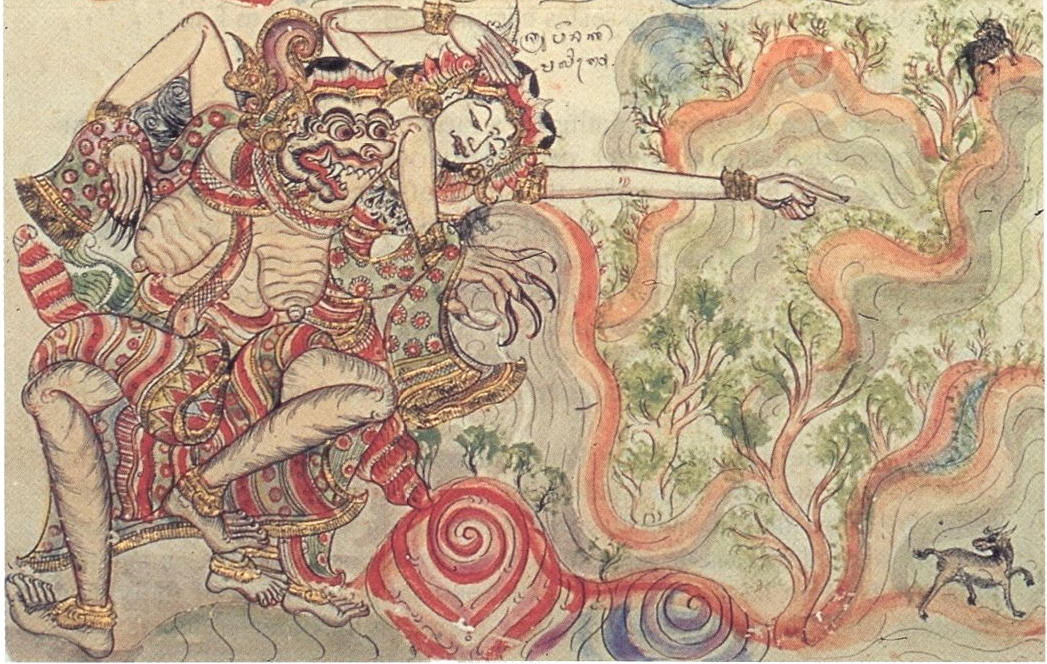
Scene from the Ramayana.

== See also ==
=== Bibliography ===
- Cooper, Thomas L. (2003). "Two Paintings Attributable to I Ketut Gédé, 19th Century Master Painter of North Bali". Archipel. 65: 145–161. doi:10.3406/arch.2003.3850.
- Hinzler, Hedwig Ingrid Rigmodis (1986). Catalogue of Balinese manuscripts in the Library of the University of Leiden and other collections in the Netherlands: Descriptions of the Balinese drawings from the Van der Tuuk Collection. Vol. 2. Brill Publishers. ISBN 9789004072343.
