= Kertha Gosa Pavilion =

Kerta Gosa Pavilion
- Kertha Gosa
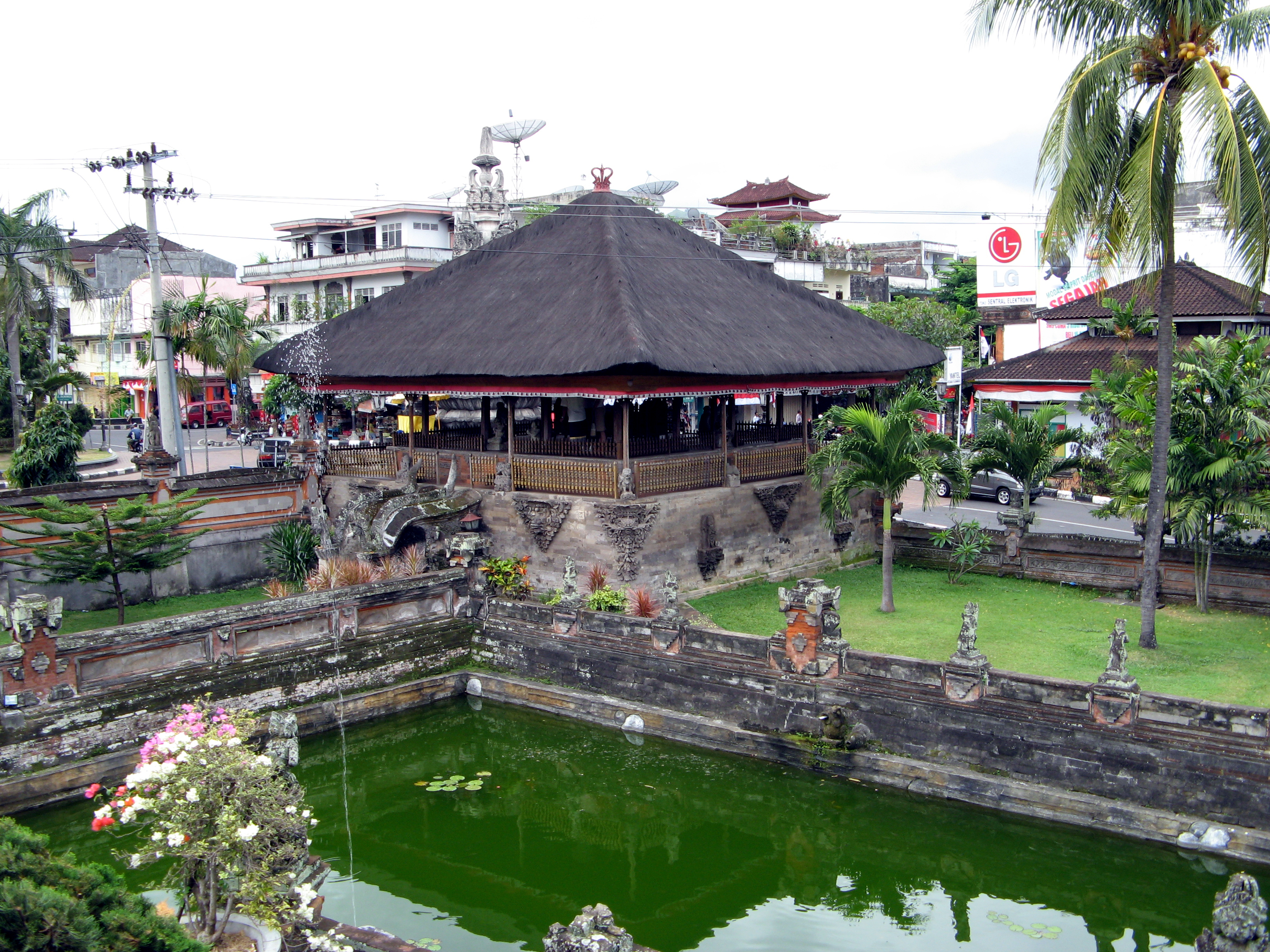
- The Kerta Ghosa Pavilion, or Court Hall, in 2015, where the king used to hear legal cases, is seen here. (Note: Like the royal temple at Taman Ayun, the remains of the royal palace at Taman Gili provide a good example of what has been called the "20th Century" architectural style; The original Klungkung Palace (c.1710) was destroyed by the Dutch, as a result of the 1908 Rebellion. Some buildings were later rebuilt, and incorporated into the present park.)
- Etymology: Court Hall

General information
- Type: Bale Paviliun
- Architectural style: Balinese
- Location: Klungkung, Bali, Jalan Kenanga No. 11, Semarapura Kelod, Klungkung, Klungkung Regency, Bali 80761, Indonesia
- Coordinates: 8.5356°S 115.4033°E
- Construction started: 18th century
- Renovated: 1918, 1933 and 1963 the panels were individually repaired in the 1980s and 1990s
- Owner: Klungkung Regency Government

Technical details
- Structural system: Stone foundation and wooden structure

Website
- klungkungkab.go.id

The Kertha Gosa Pavilion is an example of Balinese architecture located in the Klungkung Regency of Bali, Indonesia. The Kertha Gosa Pavilion at Klungkung Palace was built in the 17th century or early 18th century by Dewa Agung Jambe I.

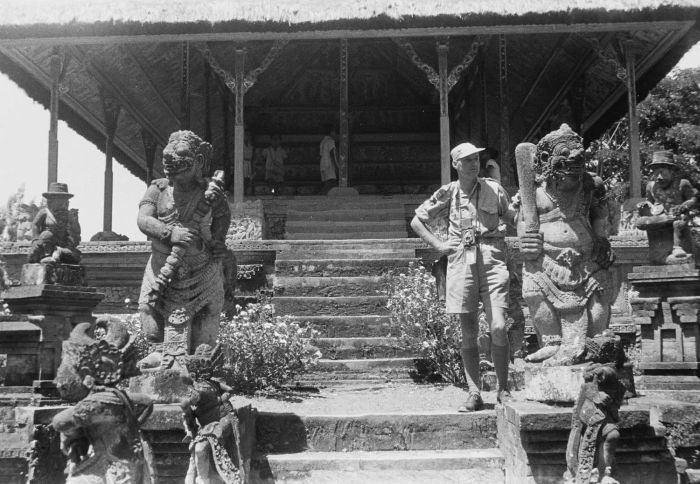
Dutch soldiers at the Kerta Gosa Pavilion on 31 March 1949

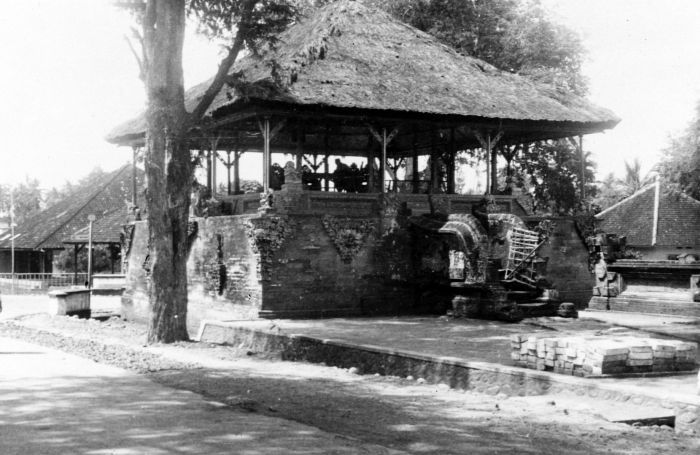
Pavilion Kerta Ghosa 1949

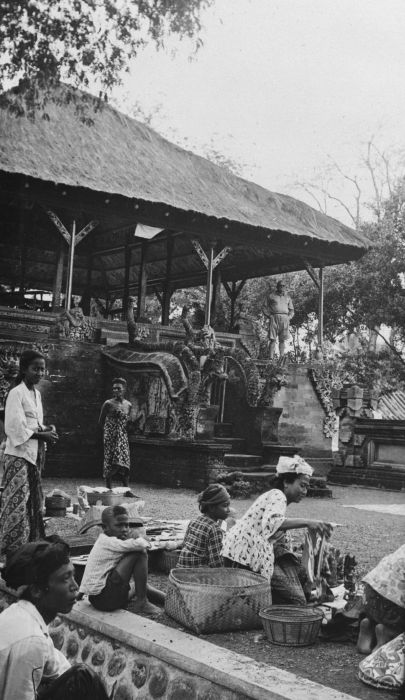
Kerta Ghosa Pavilion between 1932 and 1940

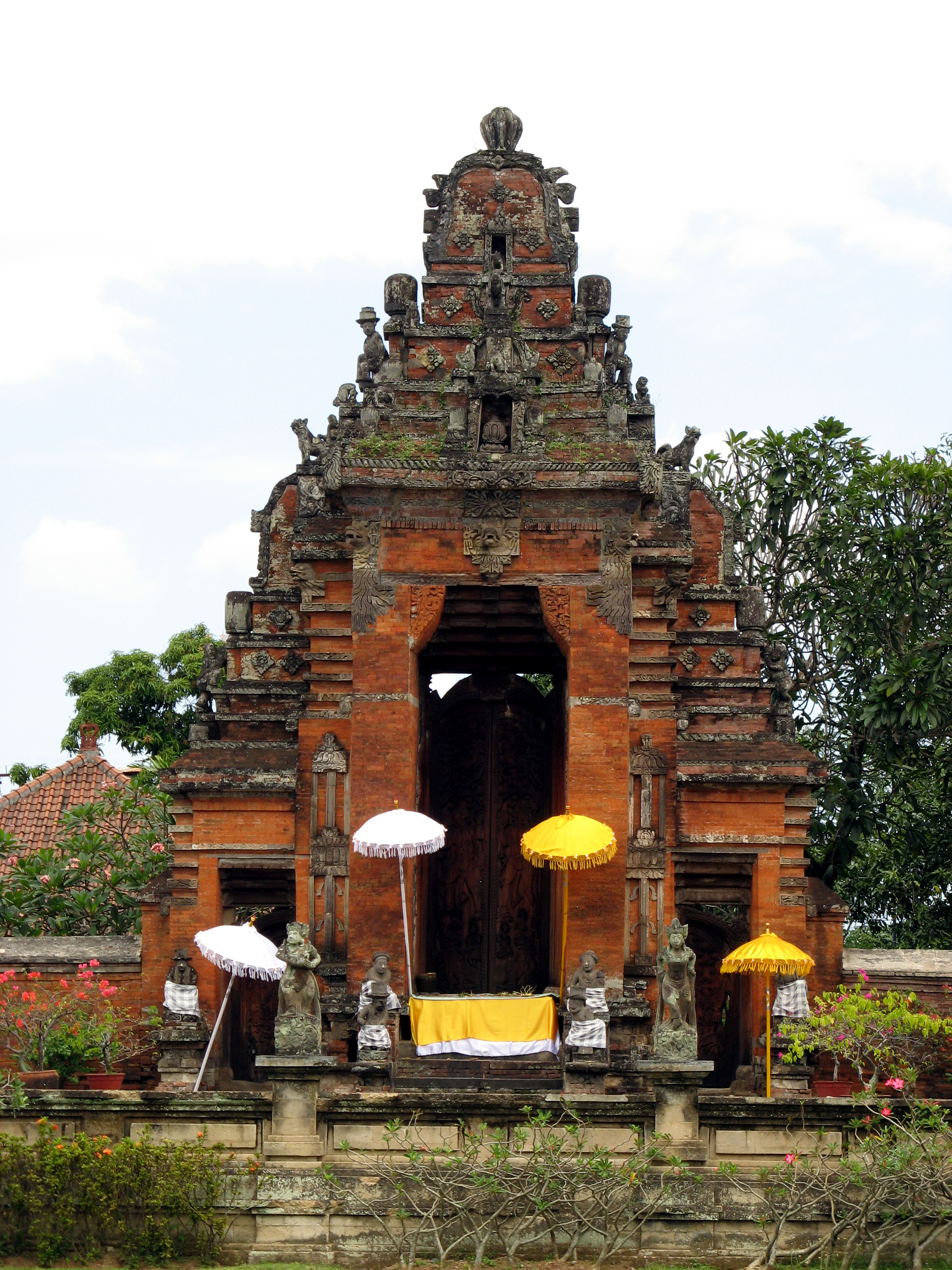
The Bale Kambang gate on the west side. The shape and decoration of this gate resembles the magnificent inner gate at Taman Ayun Temple. The roof is decorated with figures including several Europeans perched near the top. More Europeans in top hats, draped in traditional honor cloth, guard the base of the gate.

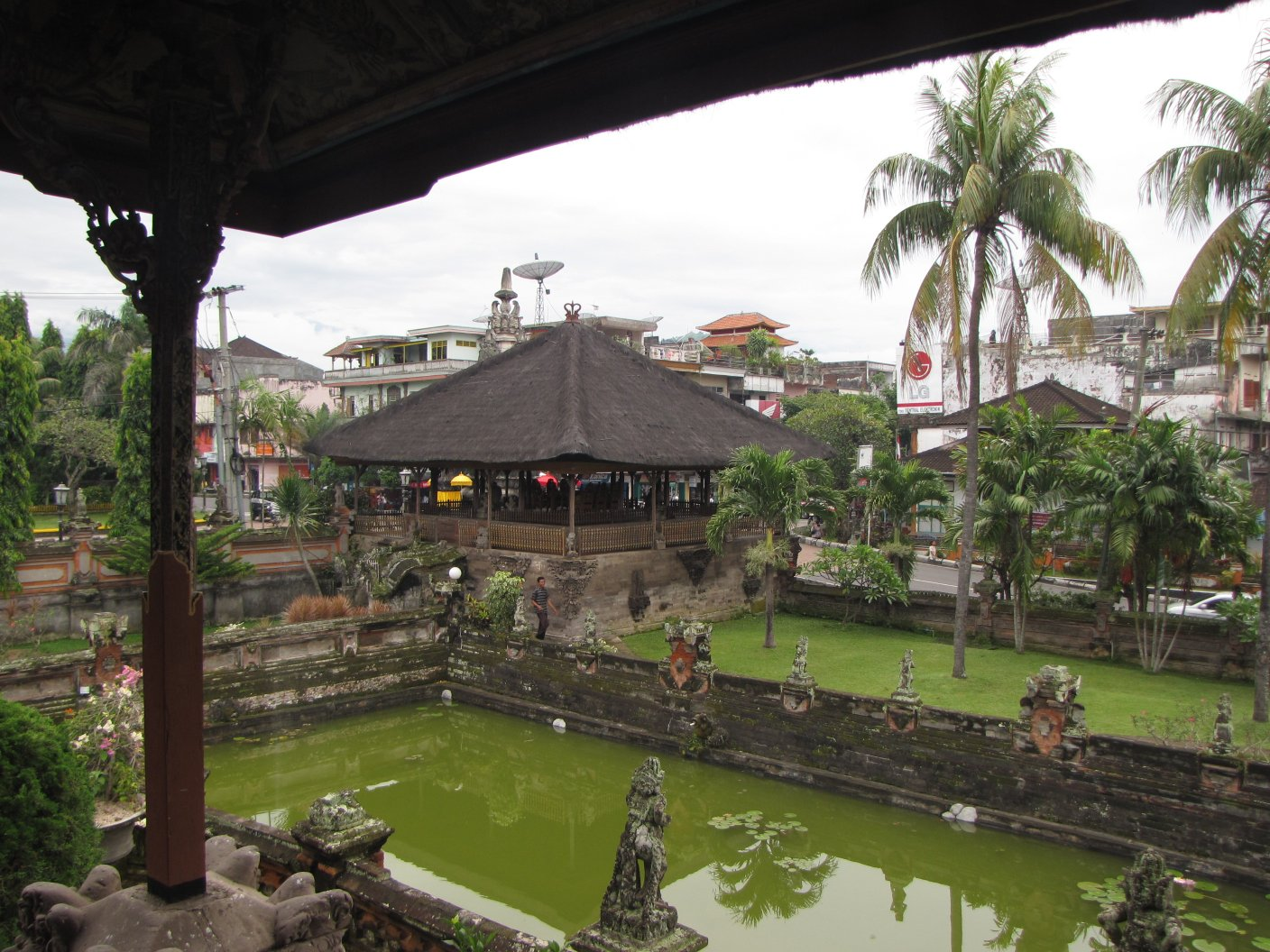
Kerta Gosa in 2011

== Etymology ==
The name Kertha Gosa derives from sanskrit, where "Kerta" means "the result" or "prosperity" and "Gosita" means "a discussion or a place for discussion".

== History ==
The layout of the whole Klungkung Palace followed that of a sanga mandala, (Note: On sanga mandala architecture : see I Kadek Merta Wijaya, I Nyoman Warnata and Ni Wayan Meidayanti Mustika, "Dualism in the transformation of Balinese ethnic residential architecture in Denpasar", Jurnal Teknik Arsitektur 7(3), December 2022, p. 289-300; and in particular p. 290-291.) with nine main centers interconnected among courtyards and other spaces. As such, Kertha Gosa represents one of these nine centers. Therefore this pavilion was built at the same time as the rest of the palace; and a carving at the main door (Pemedal agung) of the palace indicates year 1622 or around the year 1700 A.D, when Dewa Agung Jambe governed the kingdom of Klungkung. Another date often cited is 1686, with the 1622 date attributed specifically to the main door (Pemedal agung).

The first function of the pavilion, as shown through the paintings, was that of religious ceremonies for rituals of passage (manusa yadnya). But it is known to have been the place for the Supreme court of law in the kingdom, continuing as such under the Dutch occupation from 1908 to 1942 and in 1945.

The court was equipped with one table and six chairs. The king (or raja), chief of the court of justice, sat in a chair bearing the symbols of a lion. The priest (Kerthas), as lawyer and adviser of the King, had the chair with the symbols of a cow. A third chair, bearing the symbols of a dragon, was for the secretary. The people who came here to receive judgment sat cross-legged on the floor. During the Dutch occupation, the Dutch Controler - officer controlling the region - would also be present for particular trials.

Kertha Gosa Pavilion

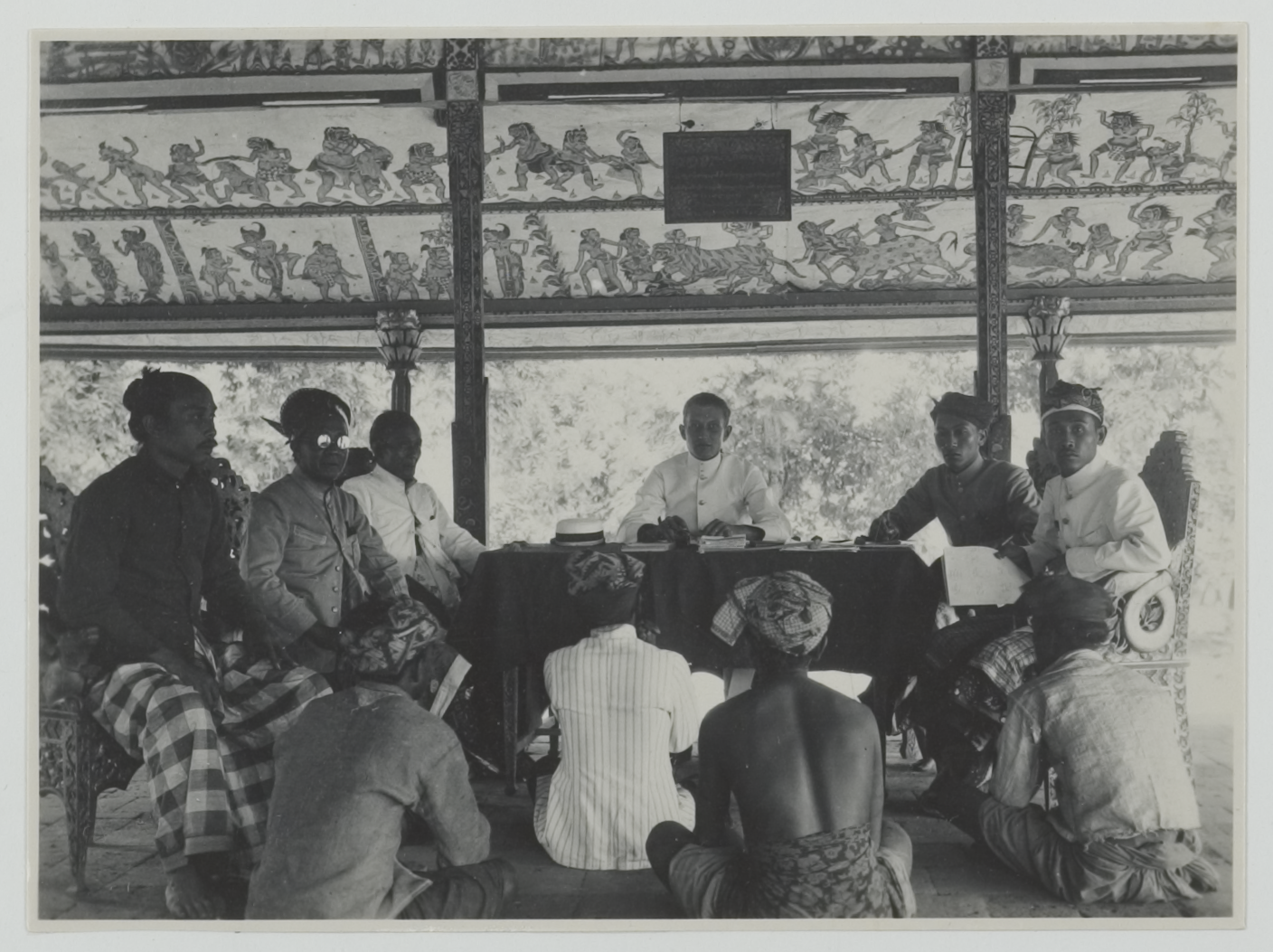
Court of justice, c. 1920

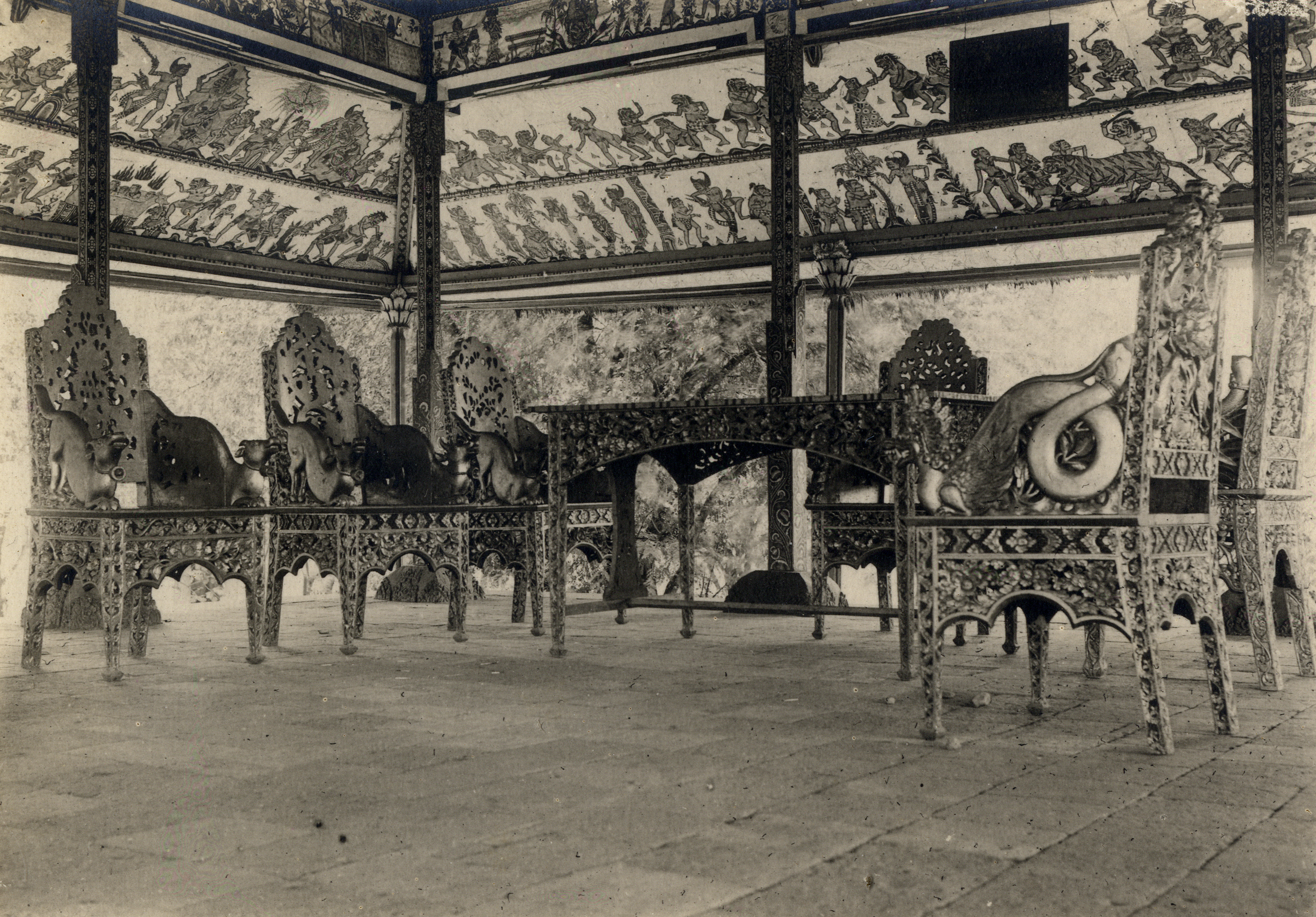
c. 1925

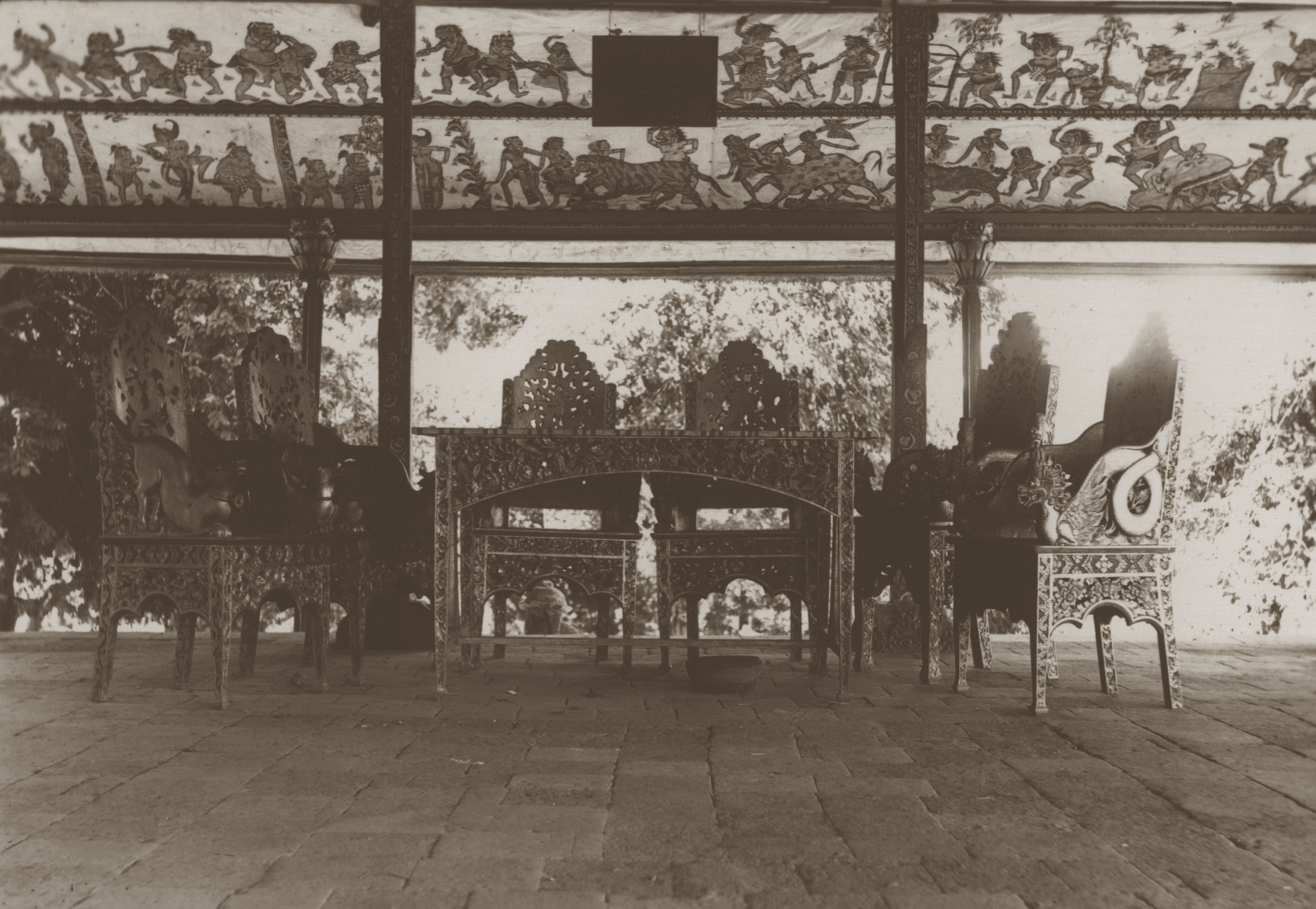
1928

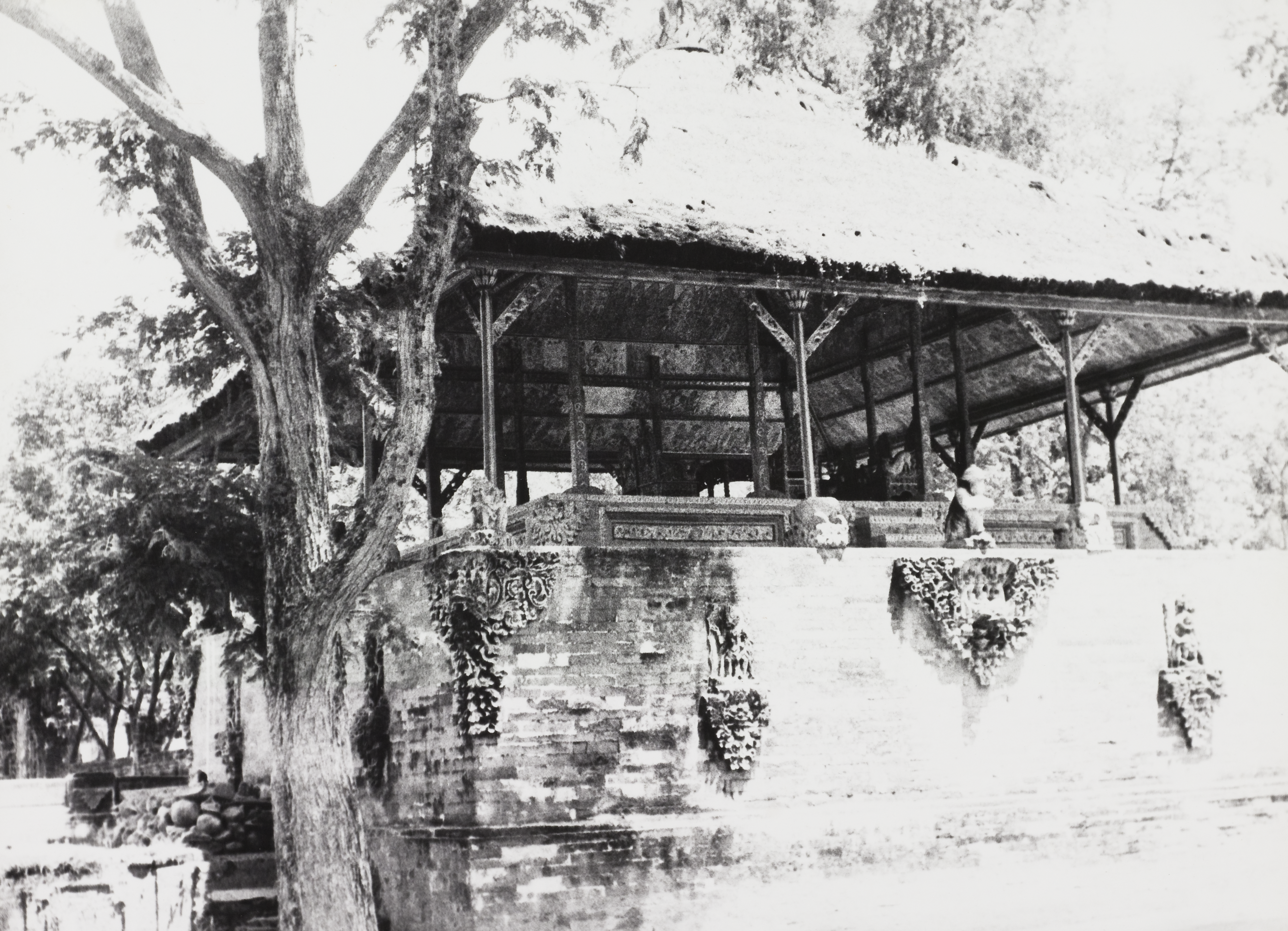
Picture taken between 1941 and 1953

== Paintings ==
The earlier paintings on the ceiling were made on fabric. In 1930 the pavilion was restaured and the paintings redone on plaster.

In 1960 the entire ceiling at Kertha Gosa was replaced and new paintings were made, still depicting the story of Bhima Swarga but adding greater detail. In 1982 eight panels were replaced.

=== Style and themes of painting ===
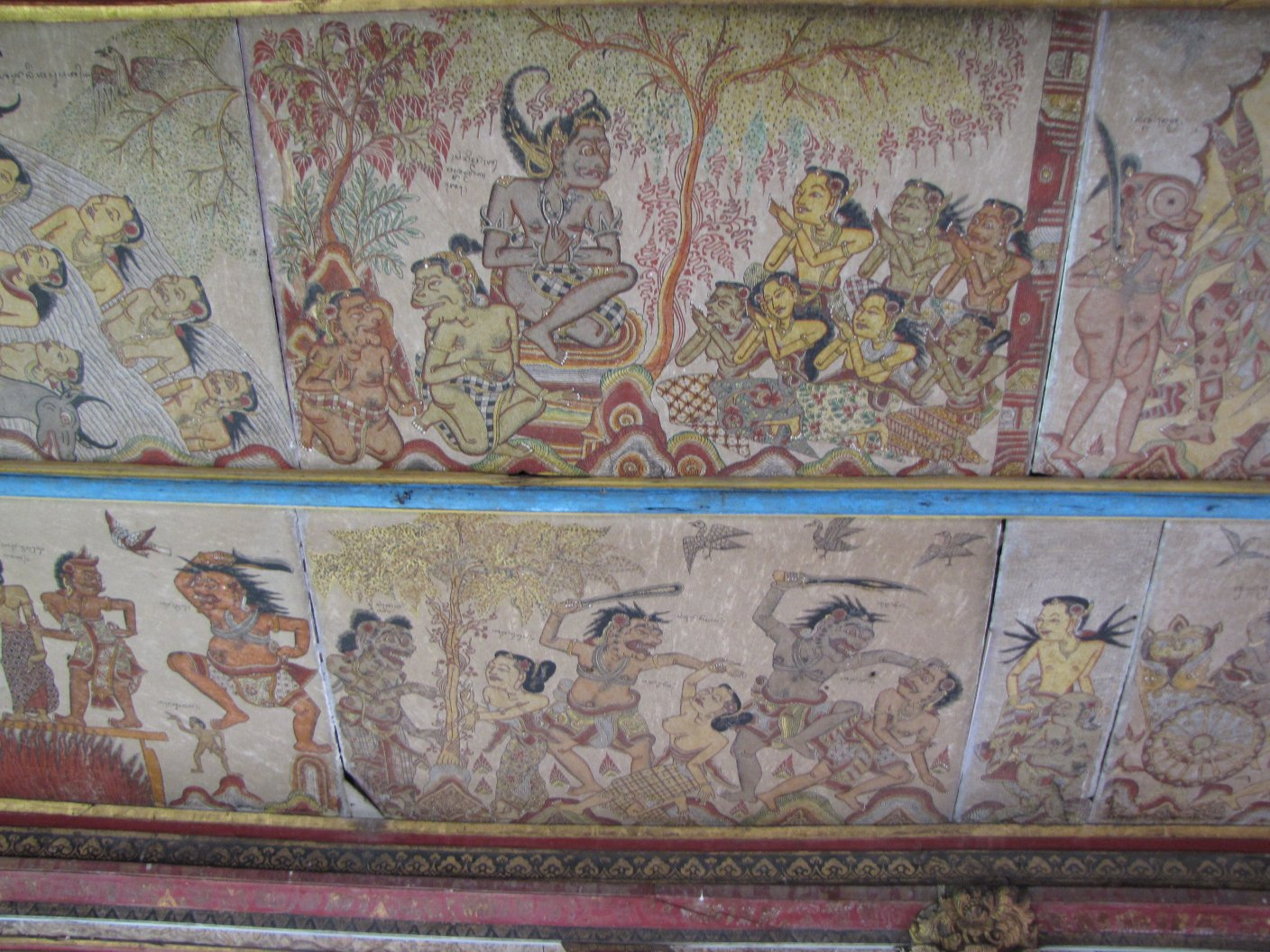

The ceiling of Kertha Gosa is painted in a traditional Balinese style that resembles wayang (puppet theatre). Paintings in the wayang style are related closely to shadow theatre art and have been faithfully preserved to reflect Bali's Hindu-Javanese heritage in its traditional iconography and content. Iconography was to represent living things through pictures and shadows because it was prohibited to represent any living entity.

The upper panels depict scenes from a section of the Hindu epic Mahabharata, called Bhima Swarga story. Some of the lower panels show scenes from the Tantri narrative; others illustrate the story of the bird-god Garuda in his quest for the water of immortality. Other lower panels show the earthquake calendar, with scenes predicting the portents of earthquakes (Palindon).

It is not known whether the Bhima Swarga was painted at the time Kertha Gosa was built. The earliest, and only, record of paintings at Kertha Gosa dates from 1842 and is written in a lontara (a book that holds prayers, the history of Bali, and epics). Also it is not known whether the paintings were a permanent feature of the pavilion or if they were a temporary decoration for a celebration.

=== Types of characters ===
All of the characters in the story of Bhima Swarga have a symbolic meaning relating to color and whether the characters are kasar or halus. Kasar characters, like the demons, are rough and coarse. They have big eyes, noses, and mouths. The hand positioning of the kasar characters is upward.

Halus characters, in contrast, are refined and flowing, recognized by delicate hands and fingers. They have small eyes, noses, mouths with thin lips and uniform teeth, and almost no facial hair. Their heads and faces are pointed downward. Bhima, his siblings, and Kunti are all halus characters. One of Bhima's most important features, assigned only to him, is his right thumb which ends in a long curved nail as his weapon; this is a magical implication.

The angle of the head and body attitude of the characters are also important. For example, human heads and bodies are always in a straight-on position, but kasal characters are represented with eyes and noses at an angle.

=== Social hierarchy ===
In the paintings, social standing is portrayed by the hierarchical position of the characters, the size of their body, and the side on which they are placed (left or right of the scene). Siwa, Heaven's most prominent god, is shown as larger and more intimidating than any other god. Similarly, Bhima dominates the other humans in the story. Bhima's servants Twalen and Mredah usually appear side by side, with Mredah, Twalen's son, placed a little below his father.

Age and social class also play a role in the placement of the five Pandawa brothers. Bhima's power is strictly physical, so his body must be unhindered and ready for battle. Bhima wears a black-and-white-checked sarong that, in Bali, is believed to have magic protective qualities. In Heaven, battle scenes are not bloody, and Bhima is usually in the center of the war panels. His body is much smaller than in hell, showing his diminished importance in comparison to the gods.

The Bhima Swarga painting is a moral epic, depicting wisdom and perseverance, and the ultimate victory of virtue over vice. It is said, “He who with fervid devotion listens to a recitation of the Mahabharata attains to high success in consequence of the merit that becomes his through understanding even a very small portion thereof. All the sins of that man who recites or listens to this history with devotion are washed off.”

Kertha Gosa Pavilion

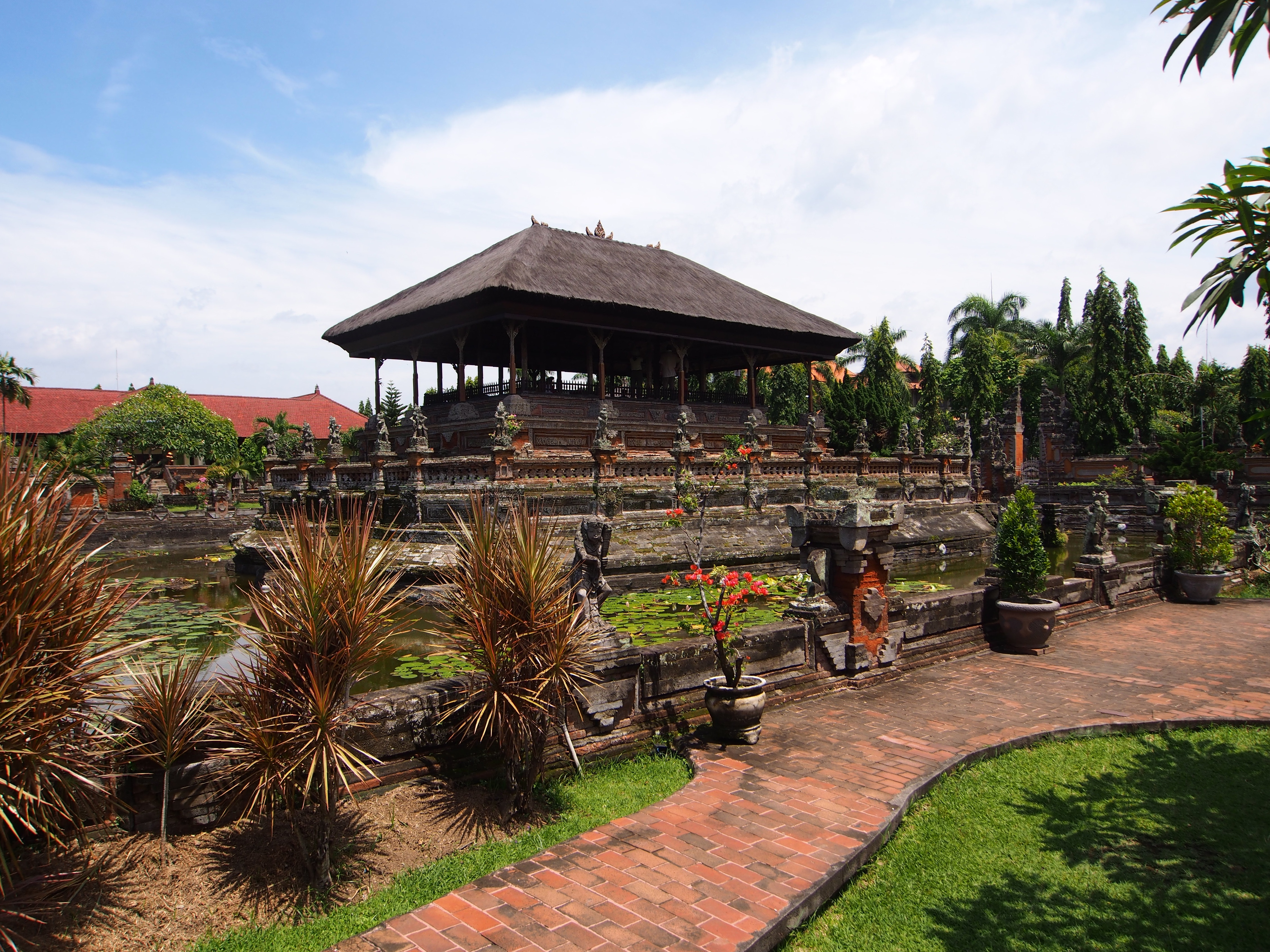

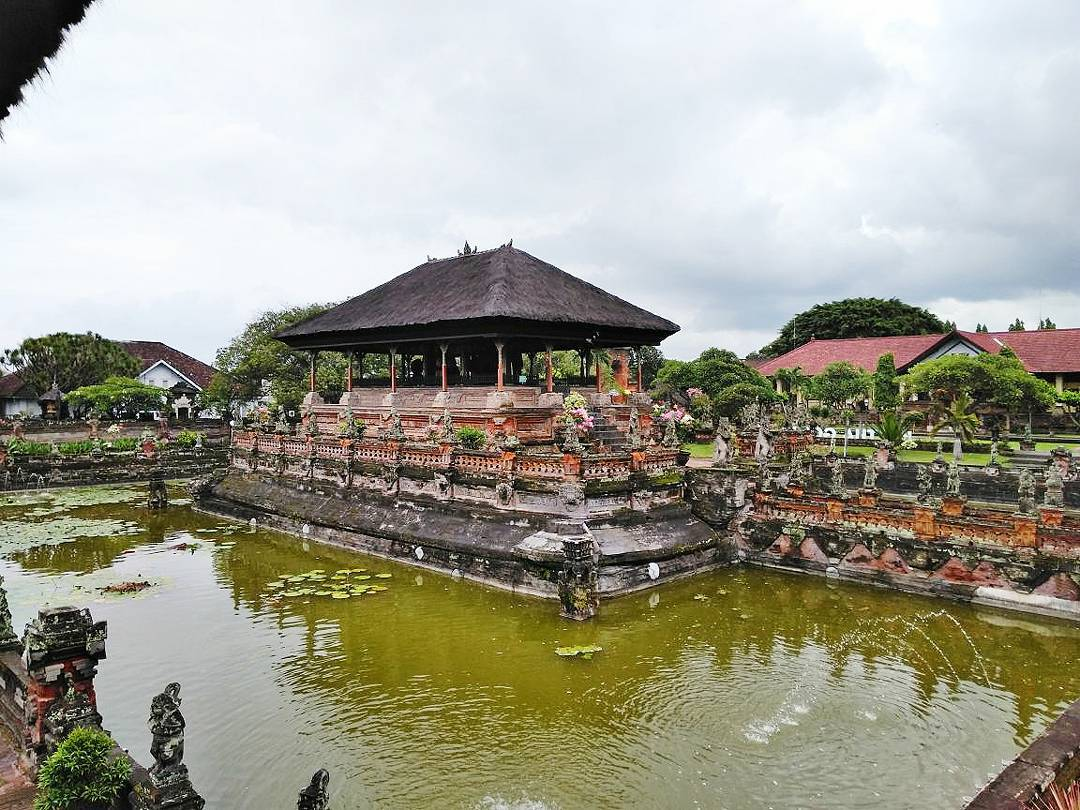

== Notes and references ==
=== Bibliography ===
- Pucci, Idanna. Bhima Swarga: The Balinese Journey of the Soul. 1st pbk. ed. Boston: Little, Brown, 1992.
