= Ngurah =

Ngurah may refer to:

- A. A. Ngurah Oka Ratmadi, the mayor of Badung
- Gusti Ngurah Made Pemecutan (died 1810), King in Badung in the late 18th century
- I Gusti Ngurah Rai (1917–1946), Indonesian National Hero during the Indonesian War of Independence
- Ngurah Rai Airport, in southern Bali, 13 km south of Denpasar
- Ngurah Rai Stadium, multi-use stadium in Denpasar, Indonesia

== See also ==
- Anugraha, official residence of the Chief Minister of Karnataka, India
