= Ngurah Oka Ratmadi =

Indonesian politician

Anak Agung Ngurah Oka Ratmadi
- ᬅᬦᬓ᭄ᬅᬕᬸᬂᬗᬸᬭᬄᬑᬓᬭᬢ᭄ᬫᬤᬶ

Indonesia Senator form Bali
- In office 2014–2019
- President: Joko Widodo
- Majority: 150.288

Speaker of the Bali Regional House of Representatives
- In office 2009–2014
- Governor: Dewa Made Beratha; I Made Mangku Pastika
- Succeeded by: I Nyoman Adi Wiryatama

8th Regent of Badung
- In office 1999–2005
- Governor: Dewa Made Beratha
- Preceded by: I Gusti Bagus Alit Putra
- Succeeded by: I Wayan Subawa

Personal details
- Born: 2 November 1945 (age 80) Denpasar, Bali, Indonesia
- Party: PDI-P
- Relations: I Gusti Ngurah Made Agung (great-grandfather)

Anak Agung Ngurah Oka Ratmadi (Balinese: ᬅᬦᬓ᭄ᬅᬕᬸᬂᬗᬸᬭᬄᬑᬓᬭᬢ᭄ᬫᬤᬶ; born 2 November 1945), known as Cok Rat, was the 8th Regent of Badung from 1999 to 2005. He was a Speaker of the Bali Regional House of Representatives (DPRD) from 2009 to 2014 and was a member and senator of the Regional Representative Council (DPD) from Bali from 2014 to 2019. He was nominated for the Governor of Bali in 2003, but he withdrew.

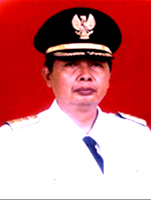
Anak Agung Ngurah Oka Ratmadi as a Regent of Badung

During his time as Regent of Badung, the Bali Bombing Incident at Paddy's Cafe occurred. He was once nominated to be the Governor of Bali in 2003 but withdrew.

== Background ==
He is the great-grandson of I Gusti Ngurah Made Agung, a National Hero of Indonesia who fought against the Dutch.

== Personal life ==
He has three children, the second one, AA Krisna Yoga, died on 7 March 2016.
