= Jaya Sabha Complex =

Official residence of the governor of Bali

- Kompleks Jaya Sabha ᬓᭀᬫ᭄ᬧ᭄ᬮᬾᬓ᭄ᬲ᭄ᬚᬬᬲᬪ
- Interactive map of the Jaya Sabha Complex area
- Former names: Puri Denpasar

General information
- Type: Official residence
- Architectural style: Balinese architecture
- Location: Surapati Street, Dangin Puri, East Denpasar, Bali, Indonesia
- Coordinates: 8°39′20″S 115°13′04″E
- Current tenants: Governor of Bali
- Construction started: 1788

Design and construction
- Architect: I Gusti Ngurah Made Pemecutan

The Jaya Sabha Complex (Indonesian: Kompleks Jaya Sabha; Balinese: ᬓᭀᬫ᭄ᬧ᭄ᬮᬾᬓ᭄ᬲ᭄ᬚᬬᬲᬪ) or only Jaya Sabha is the official residence of the governor of Bali located in East Denpasar, northeast of Catus Patha (Catur Muka statue), point 0 of Denpasar City. This place is right on the Puputan I Gusti Made Agung field, which is the former Puri Agung Denpasar.

Formerly named Puri Denpasar, this place was destroyed by Dutch troops during the Puputan war in 1906.

== History ==
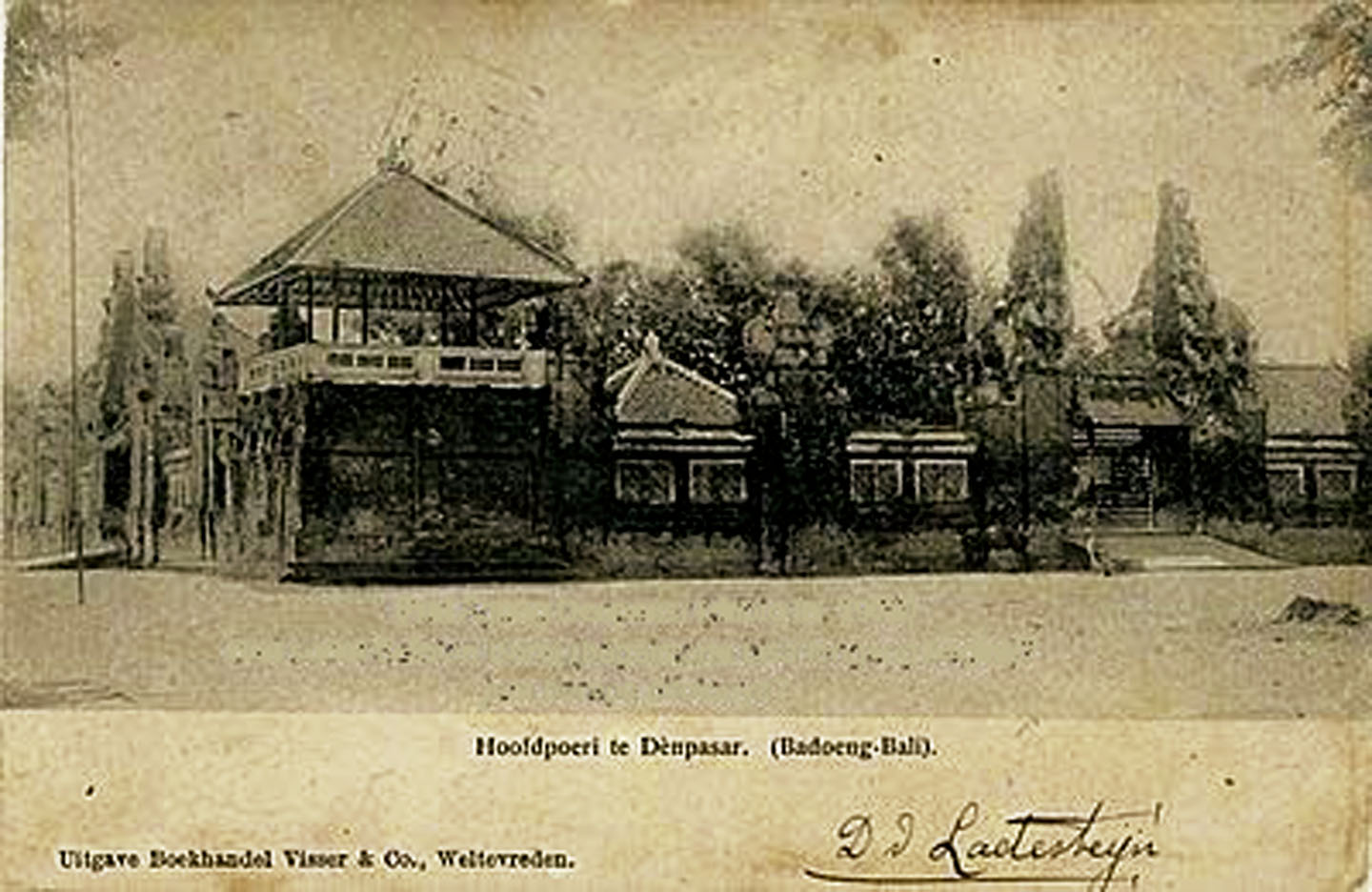
Photo of the Main Gate of the Puri Agung Denpasar Palace before the Puputan Badung war, 1906

Jaya Sabha Complex has a history that is closely related to Denpasar. In the past, Denpasar was the name for the favorite garden of the King of Badung, Kyai Jambe Ksatrya who lived in Puri Satria (Puri Agung Denpasar).

The King of Badung really liked the beauty of nature, so he made a garden under a banyan tree. This garden is located on the north side of the market south of Puri Satria. The shape of this plant is unique because it has a place for cockfighting. This Denpasar Park became the pioneer of the Puri Denpasar complex which was built in 1788 by I Gusti Ngurah Made Pemecutan. After the Puri Denpasar complex was completed, the center of government of the Badung kingdom moved to Puri Denpasar.

During the Dutch era, Puri Denpasar was destroyed by the Dutch. This happened during the Puputan war in 1906. The Dutch then used it as the center of government for South Bali. During Dutch rule, this building was not changed at all in shape and placement in the palace. After Indonesia's independence, the government used it as the office and official residence of the governor of Bali.

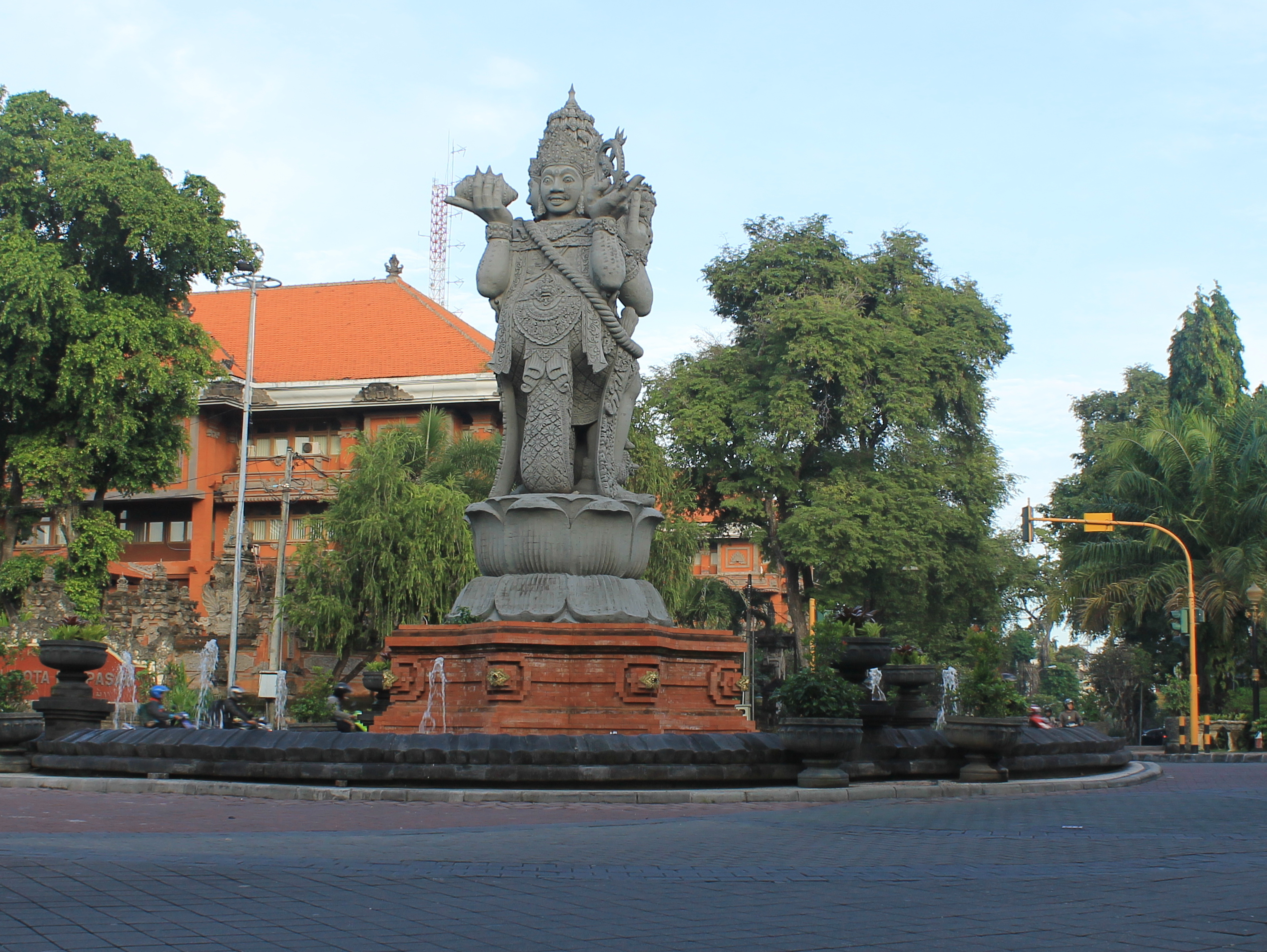
Catur Muka Statue, in the northeast of the Jaya Sabha Complex

== Relics ==
The remaining relics are the Pemrajan Alit family temple located in the corner of Kaja Kangin or northeast of the Jaya Sabha area. In addition, other relics of the Puri Agung Denpasar Plan are still recorded in a sketch and are now part of the collection of the Bali Museum in Denpasar.

== See also ==
- Governor of Bali
- Puri in Bali
- Balinese traditional house
- Denpasar
