= Dutch intervention in Bali (1908) =

Invasion by the Netherlands

Dutch invasion of southern Bali (1908)
Date	April 1908
Location	Bali, Indonesia
Result	Dutch victory

Belligerents
Netherlands	Balinese fighting for independence

Commanders and leaders
(Netherlands) Marinus Bernardus Rost van Tonningen	Dewa Agung Jambe †; Raja of Bangli (surrendered); Raja of Karangasem (surrendered)

Strength
250	700

Casualties and losses
6 killed 5 wounded	200 killed

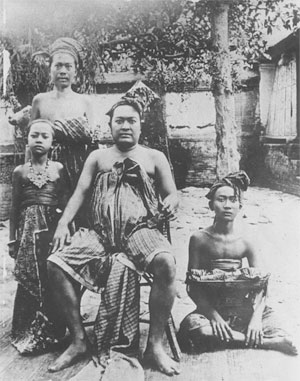
Dewa Agung in 1908

The Dutch conquest of Klungkung, Bali in 1908 marked the final phase of Dutch colonial control over the island of Bali in Indonesia. It was the seventh and last military action in Bali, following the so-called Dutch intervention in Bali (1906).

The intervention was triggered by Balinese opposition to a Dutch attempt to impose an opium monopoly in their favour. The raja of Klungkung, the highest status king of Bali, opposed the imposition of the monopoly. An attack on the Dutch opium store in Gelgel, on 16 April 1908 was instigated by Cokorda Gelgel, a member of the Klungkung dynasty. At the same time, the ruler of Klungkung, the Dewa Agung, ordered the closure of the opium store in Klungkung city.

The Dutch sent troops in revenge. In Gelgel, they killed 100 Balinese, forcing the Cokorda to flee to Klungkung. The Dutch then bombarded the city of Klungkung.

In a final confrontation on 18 April 1908, Dewa Agung Jambe, the Raja of Klungung, accompanied by 200 followers, made a desperate sortie out of his palace, clad in white and armed with a legendary kris supposed to wreak havoc on the enemy according to a prophecy. The Raja was shot by a Dutch bullet. Immediately, the six wives of the king killed themselves with their own kris, soon followed by the other Balinese in the procession.

The Dutch burned the royal palace to the ground. As Klungkung came under Dutch power, the Raja of Bangli submitted and in October 1908 negotiated for a Dutch protectorate similar to that of Gianyar and Karangasem. These events ended Balinese resistance to Dutch colonialism.

== See also ==
- History of Bali
- Klungkung Palace
