= Dutch intervention in Bali (1906) =

Dutch colonial conquest in Indonesia

Dutch conquest of Southern Bali (1906)
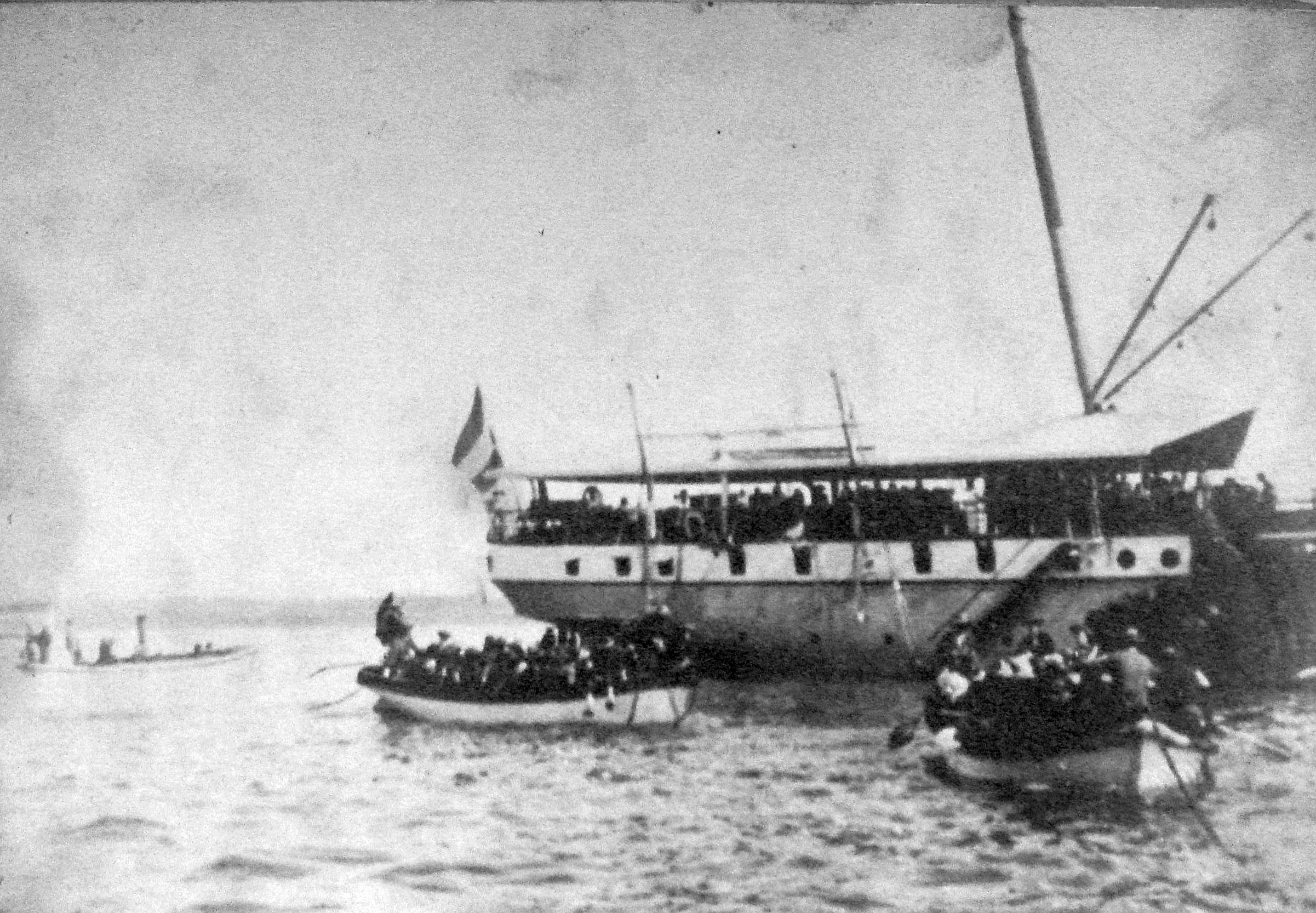
Dutch troops landing at Sanur

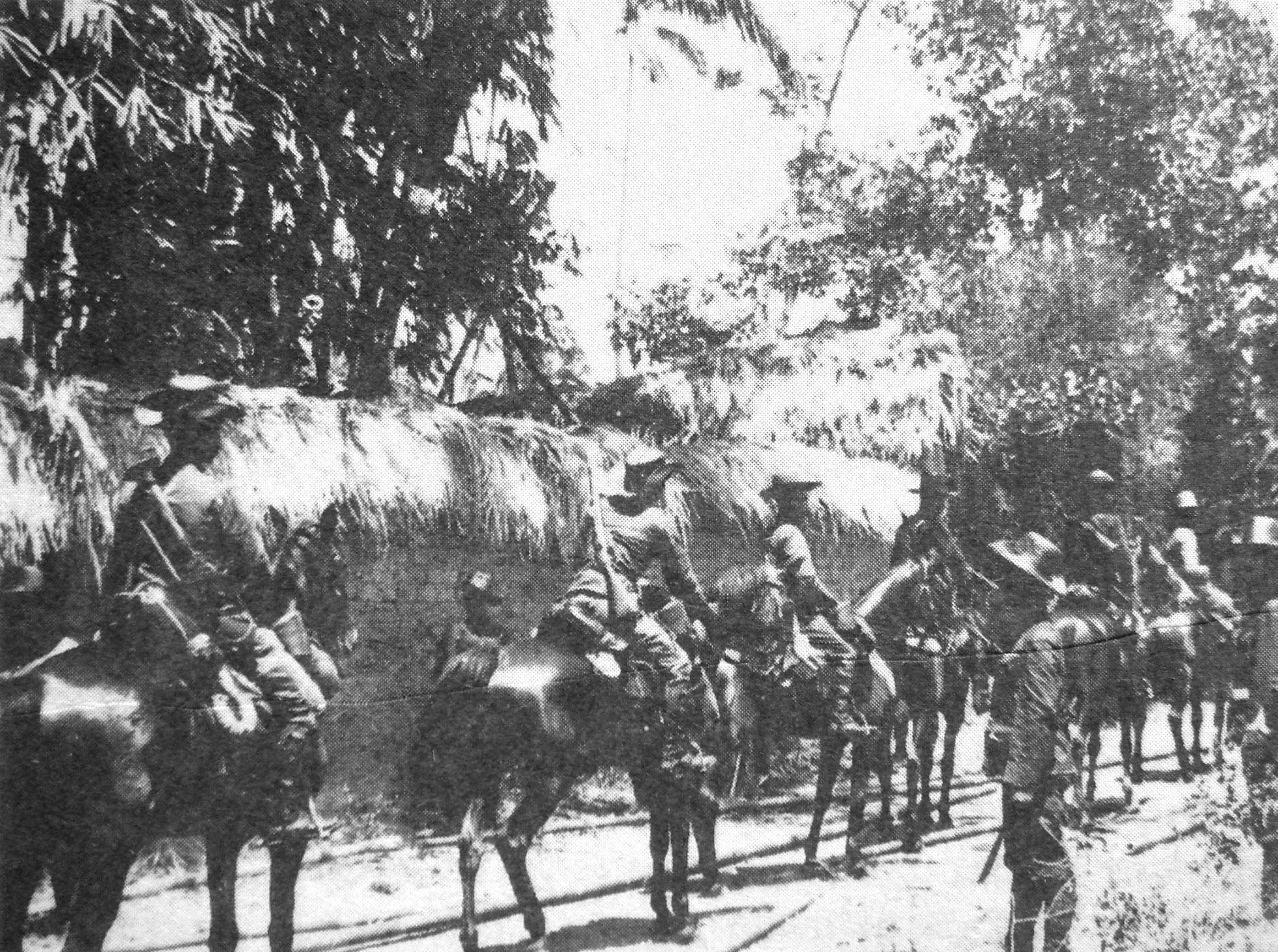
Dutch cavalry at Sanur
| Date | September–October 1906 |
| Location | Bali |
| Result | Dutch victory |
| Territorial changes | Dutch control of southern Bali |

Belligerents
| Dutch East Indies | Kingdom of Badung; Kingdom of Tabanan; Kingdom of Klungkung |

Commanders and leaders
| (Netherlands) Major General Rost van Tonningen | Raja I Gusti Ngurah Made Agung |

Strength
| 3 infantry battalions 1 cavalry detachment 2 artillery batteries Navy fleet | Unknown |

Casualties and losses
| Minimal | Over 1,000 killed |

The Dutch conquest of Southern Bali in 1906 was a Dutch military intervention in Bali as part of the Dutch colonial conquest of the Indonesian islands, killing an estimated 1,000 people. It was part of the final takeover of the Netherlands East-Indies and the fifth Dutch military intervention in Bali. The campaign led to the deaths of the Balinese rulers of Badung and Tabanan kingdoms, their wives and children and followers. This conquest weakened the remaining independent kingdoms of Klungkung and Bangli, leading to their invasion two years later.

== Context ==
The Netherlands had conquered north Bali in the middle of the 19th century after three military campaigns, although resistance there continued well into the 1860s. This conquest saw the integration of the kingdoms of Jembrana and Buleleng into the Dutch East Indies. Subsequently, the Dutch conquest of the neighbouring island of Lombok led to the surrender of its Balinese ruling house, the kingdom of Karangasem. In 1900, the kingdom of Gianyar ceded its sovereignty to the Netherlands. The southern kingdoms of Tabanan and Badung firmly resisted Dutch control, influenced by their close connection to the kingdom of Klungkung, which had the highest status of the Balinese kingdoms. The Netherlands Indies government applied pressure to the independent kingdoms, including through disputes of trade and access rights to port areas. One point of dispute was the practice of masatia termed suttee by Europeans, the ritual self-sacrifice of relatives upon the death of a ruler. The Dutch demanded its abolition in keeping with European portrayals of indigenous rulers as despotic. The last recorded masatia took place in Tabanan in 1904 against Dutch protests.

In 1900, the Dutch negotiated a relationship with Gianyar which amounted to establishing a protectorate, and established administrative control over the kingdom system through its ruler, which included collection of taxes. Bridges and roads and irrigation systems were improved and the justice system was brought into line with that of the Netherlands East Indies. One result of the successes in Gianyar was an increase in refugees from neighboring kingdoms seeking to escape the control of other kingdoms, which the Dutch claimed was a response to slavery and tyranny in those kingdoms. This effective takeover of Gianyar geographically split the alliance of Klungkung and its vassal Bangli from Badung and Tabanan.

There were recurrent disputes between the Dutch and Balinese kings regarding the right to plunder ships that foundered off the reefs surrounding Bali. According to a Balinese tradition called tawang karang, the Balinese kings traditionally considered such wrecks as their property, which the Dutch claimed was a violation of European-based international law. On 27 May 1904, a Chinese schooner named Sri Kumala struck the reef near Sanur, in Badung, and was plundered by the Balinese. Upon request for compensation by the Dutch, the king of Badung refused to pay anything, blaming his relative the ruler of Kesiman. In June 1906, the Dutch started a blockade of the southern coasts and sent various ultimata.

== Intervention ==
On 14 September 1906, the Sixth Military Expedition of the Dutch colonial army, landed at the northern part of Sanur beach. It was under the command of Major General M.B. Rost van Tonningen. Badung soldiers made some attacks on the bivouacs of the Dutch at Padang Galak in the northern part of Sanur on 15 September, and there was some resistance again at Intaran village just to the south of Padang Galak.

=== Kesiman ===
Overall, the force managed to move inland without much resistance, and arrived in the palace of Kesiman on 20 September 1906. There, the local king, a member of the extended royal family of Badung, had already been killed by his own priest, as he had refused to lead an armed resistance against the Dutch. The palace was in flames and the resistance had fallen back to Denpasar, the site of the main palace of Badung.

=== Denpasar ===
The force marched to Denpasar, described by Dutch participants as if they were in a dress parade. They approached the royal palace or puri, noting smoke rising from it and hearing a frantic beating of signal drums (slit wooden gongs) coming from within the palace walls.

Upon their reaching the palace, a silent procession emerged, led by the Raja borne by four bearers on a palanquin. The Raja was dressed in traditional white cremation garments, wore magnificent jewellery, and carried a ceremonial kris. The other people in the procession consisted of the Raja's officials, guards, priests, wives, children and retainers, all of whom were similarly attired. They had received the rites of death, were dressed in white, and had had their ritual kris blessed.

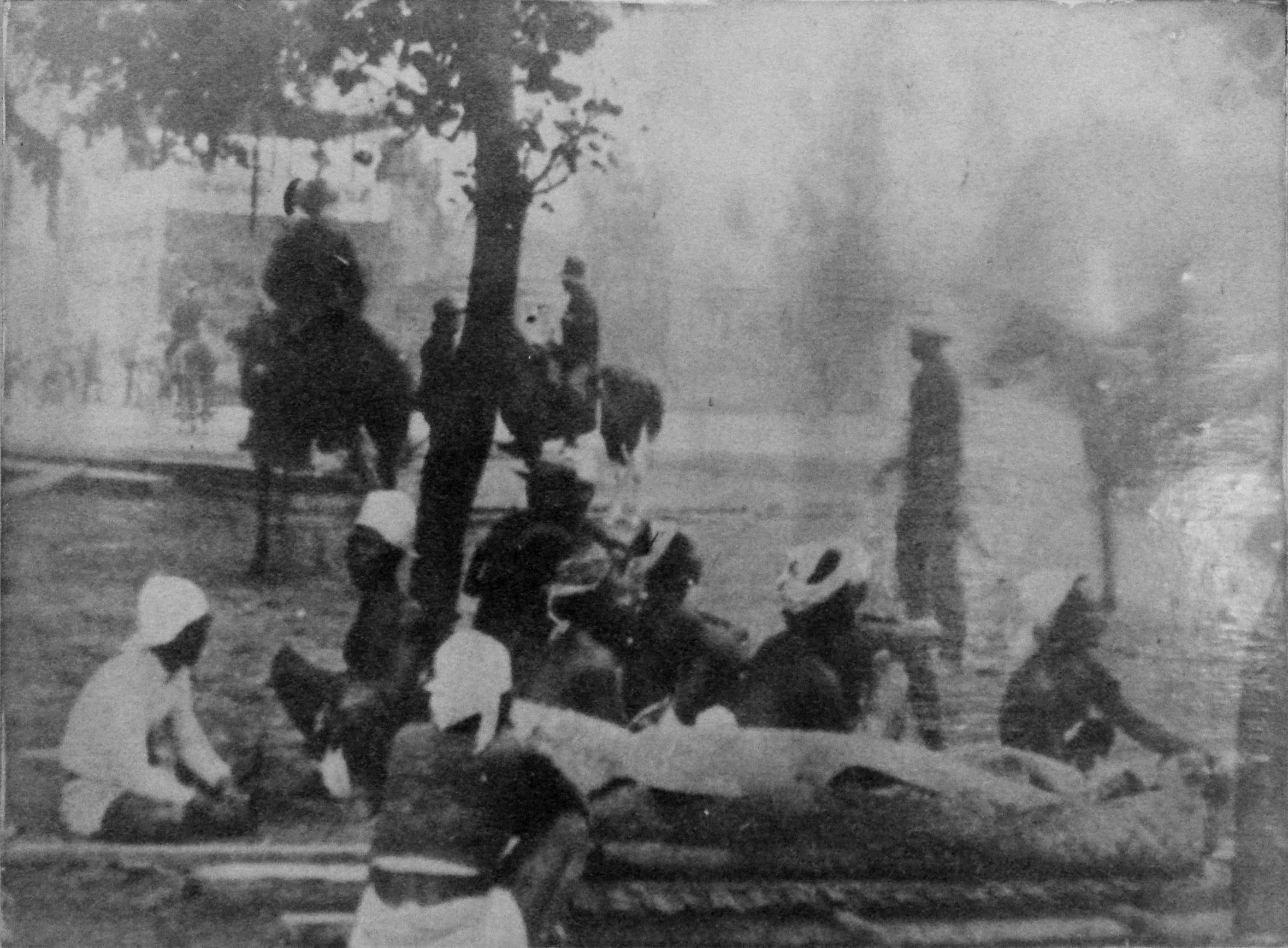
Wrapping the body of the Raja.

When the procession was a hundred paces from the Dutch force, they halted and the Raja stepped down from the palanquin and signalled a priest, who plunged his dagger into the Raja's breast. The rest of the procession began killing themselves and others, in a rite known as Puputan ("Fight to the death"). Women mockingly threw jewellery and gold coins at the troops.

What they claimed was a 'stray gunshot' and an 'attack by lance and spear' prompted the Dutch to open fire with rifles and artillery. As more people emerged from the palace, the mounds of corpses rose higher and higher as they were mown down by gunfire. Balinese accounts describe that the Dutch first opened fire on the Balinese people moving outside of the palace gate, only equipped with traditional krises, spears and shields, and that survivors killed themselves, or had themselves killed by their followers according to the dictates of the puputan. The whole procession led to a death toll of at least 1,000, although that figure was not officially released by the Dutch. The soldiers stripped the corpses of the valuables and sacked the ruins of the burned palace. The palace of Denpasar was razed to the ground.

The same afternoon, similar events occurred in the nearby palace of Pemecutan, where the co-ruler Gusti Gede Ngurah resided. The Dutch let the nobility at Pemecutan kill themselves, and proceeded with the looting.

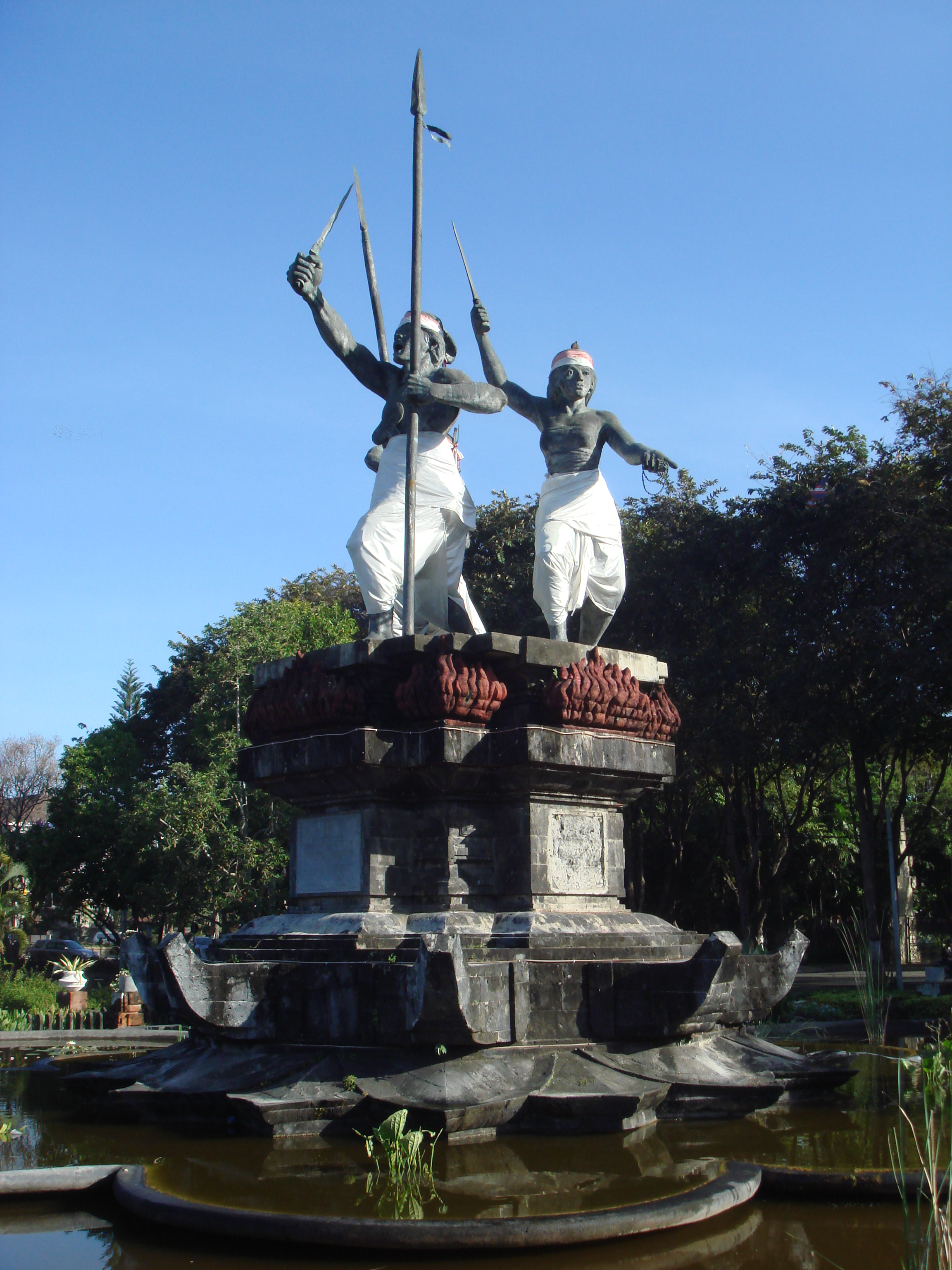
Monument to the 1906 Puputan, located in Taman Puputan, Denpasar, Bali.

The massacre is remembered locally as the "Badung Puputan" and is glorified as an example of resistance to foreign aggression. A huge bronze monument was elevated on the central square of Denpasar, where the royal palace used to stand, glorifying Balinese resistance in the Puputan.

=== Tabanan ===
The Dutch force continued to the kingdom of Tabanan, where the king Gusti Ngurah Agung and his son retreated, then surrendered to the Dutch, and attempted to negotiate a settlement to become a regency of the Netherlands East Indies. The Dutch only offered them exile to nearby Madura or Lombok, and they preferred to kill themselves (puputan) in prison two days later. Their palace was also plundered and razed by the Dutch.

=== Klungkung ===
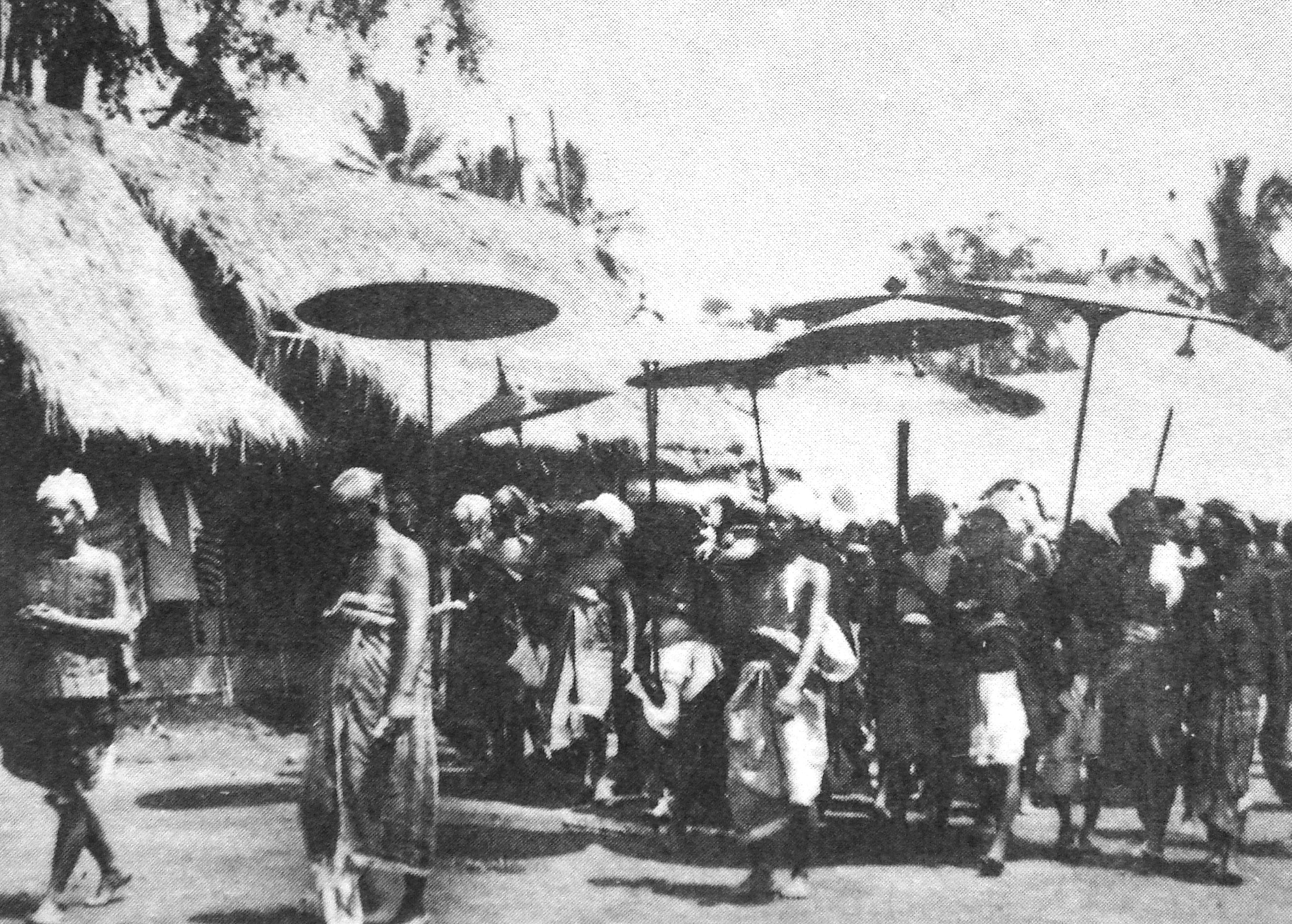
Dewa Agung of Klungkung, nominal ruler of all Bali, arriving in Gianyar to negotiate with the Dutch.

The Dutch also moved troops to Klungkung and considered an attack on king Dewa Agung, the nominal ruler of all Bali, but eventually held off as Dewa Agung refrained from military action against the Dutch and signed agreements to destroy his fortifications, deliver his firearms and renounce import and export taxes.

A pretext for the Dutch to attack Klungkung occurred in 1901, leading to the puputan there 1908 Dutch intervention in Bali, which would put a final end to autochthonous rule in Bali.

== Aftermath ==
In the short term, the 1906 Dutch invasion in Bali, and its sequel in 1908, sealed the Dutch control of the island.

The Dutch invasion however was followed closely by media coverage, and reports of the bloody conquest of the southern part of the island filtered to the West. The punitive actions of the Netherlands Indies government were considered harsh by European critics. The image of the Netherlands as a benevolent and responsible colonial power was seriously affected as a consequence.

The harshness of these and other military actions contrasted with the "Ethical policy" announced the Queen of the Netherlands in 1901 that emphasised benevolent rule. As a result of the Ethical Policy, efforts were made at preserving Bali culture and at making it a "living museum" of classical culture,. In 1914, Bali was opened to tourism.

== In fiction ==
Vicki Baum's 1937 historical novel Love and Death in Bali (Liebe und Tod auf Bali) tells of a family caught up in the 1906 events. The book was written after Baum's visit to Bali in 1935, when she became close friends with Walter Spies, a German painter who lived on the island for many years and who provided her with much information on these events - at the time still well within living memory.

== Gallery ==
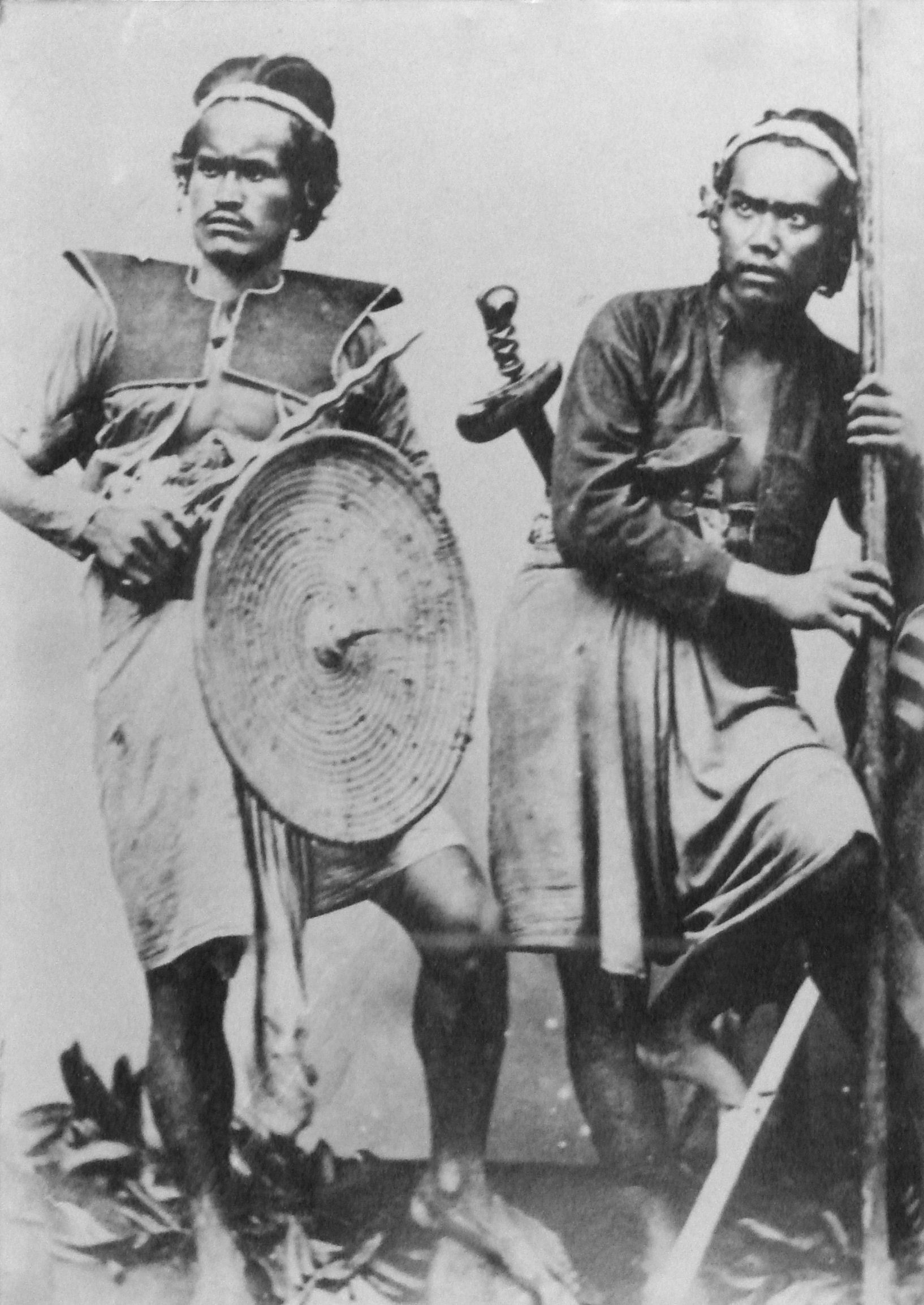
Balinese soldiers in the 1880s.

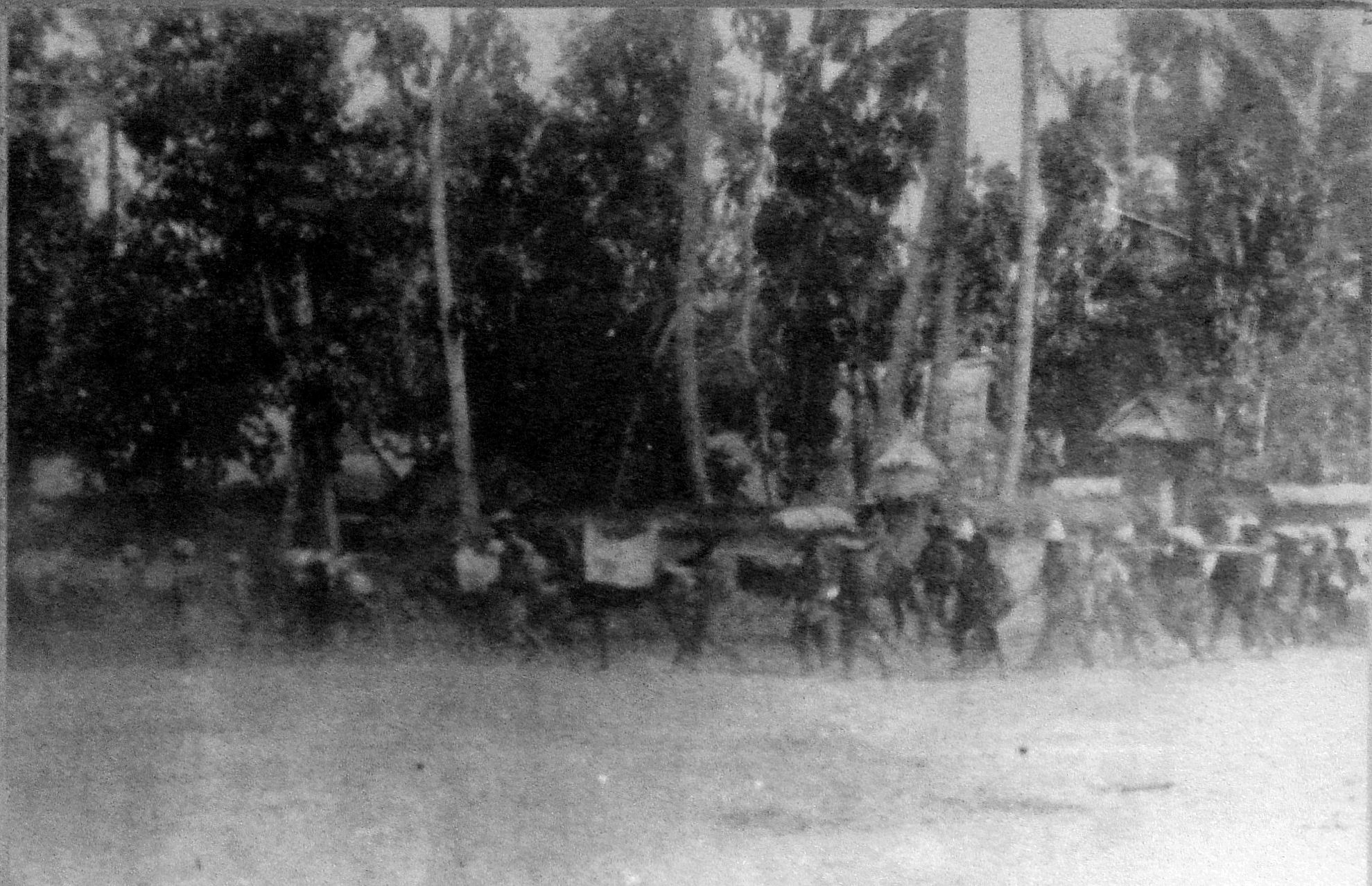
Dutch column moving forward to Denpasar.

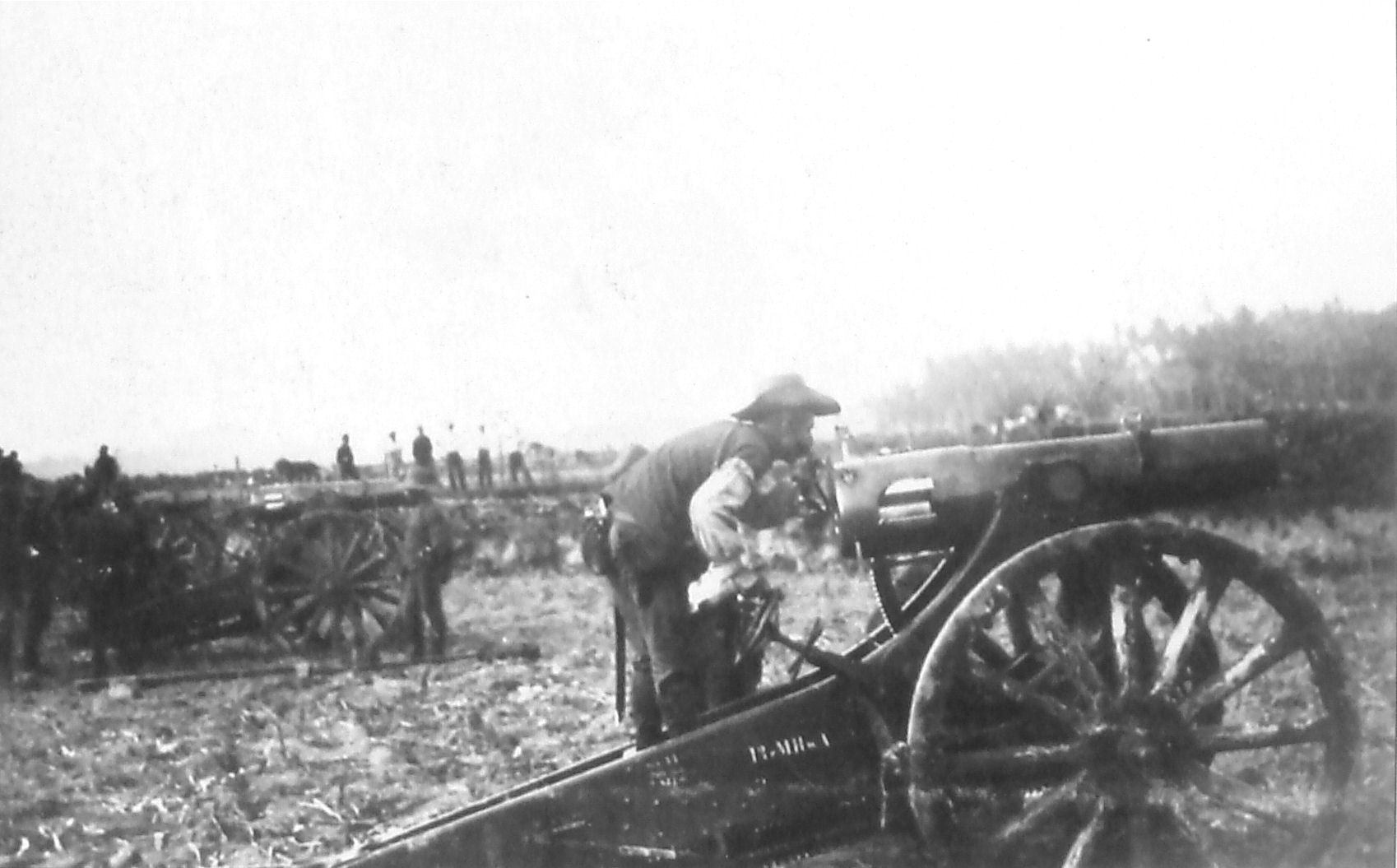
Dutch artillery in the fight against the Balinese, 1906.

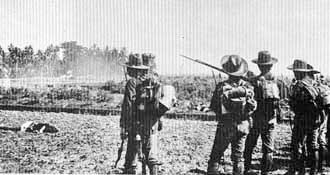
Dutch troops in Bali 1906.

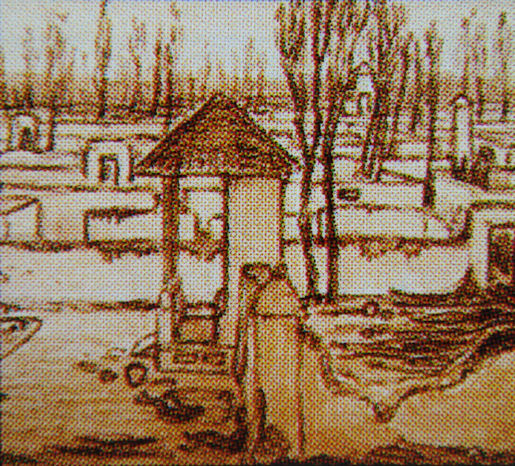
Ruins of Denpasar after the conflict. W.O.J. Nieuwenkamp.

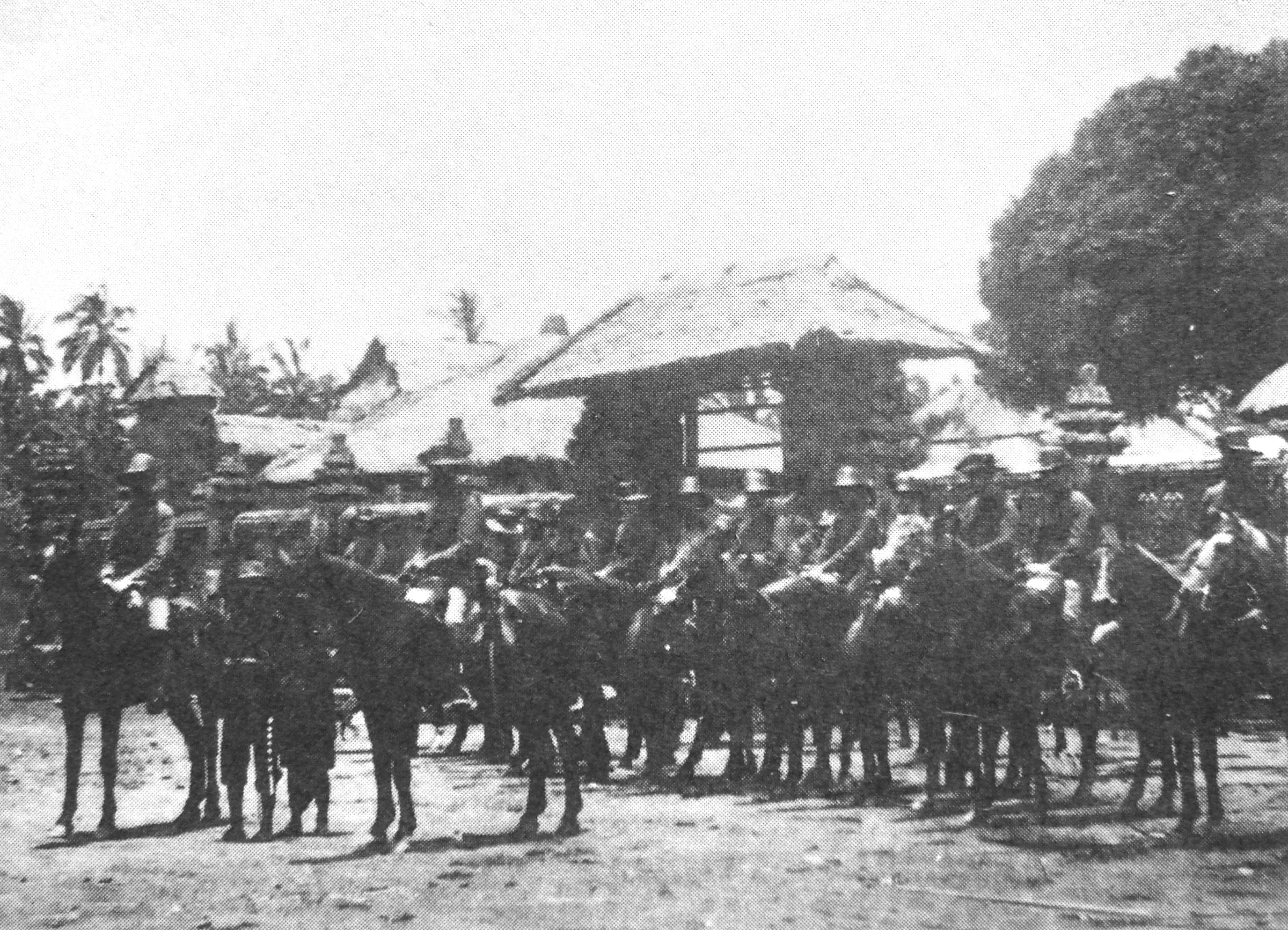
Dutch cavalry in front of the Royal Palace at Tabanan.

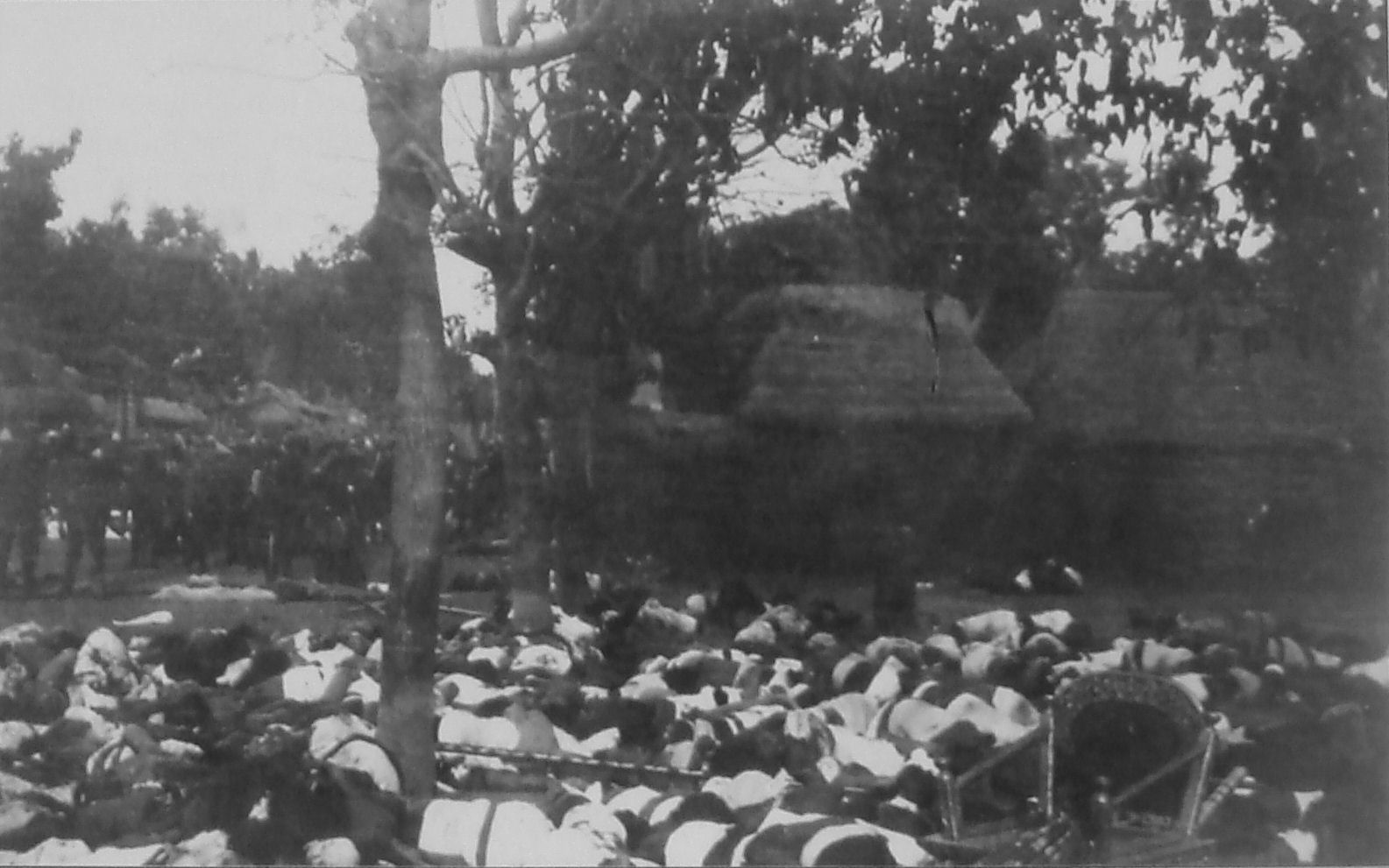
Corpses of the puputan at Denpasar. Dutch troops are standing on the left.
