= 2003 Bali gubernatorial election =

Local election in Indonesia

Bali gubernatorial election 2003
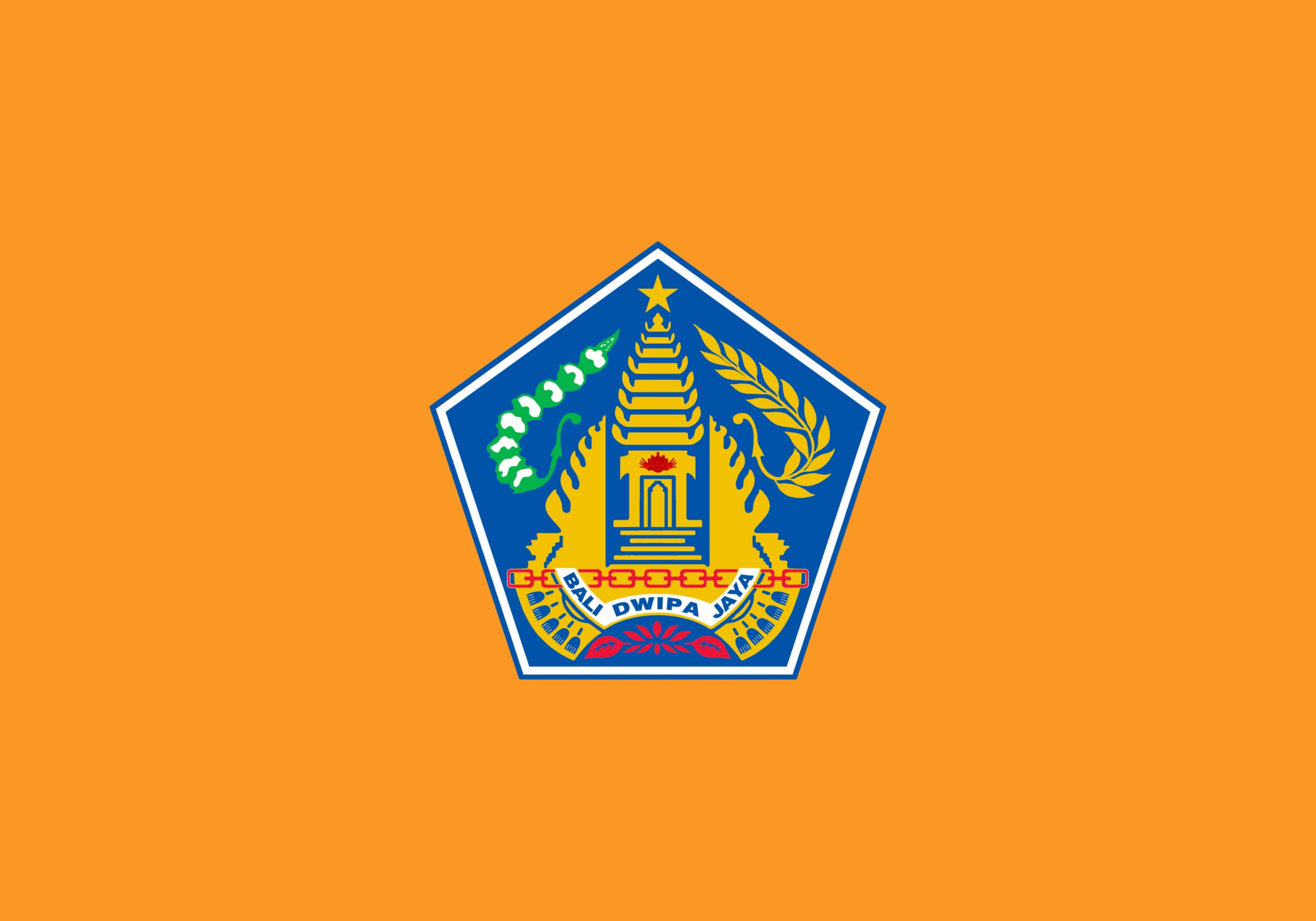
- July 30, 2003 (first process); August 6, 2003 (second process)
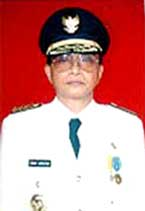

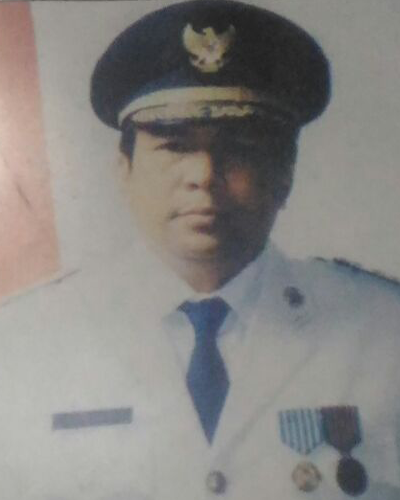

Candidate	Dewa Made Beratha	Tjokorda Gde Budi Suryawan	Gede Ngurah Wididana
Party	Indonesian Democratic Party of Struggle Faction	Unity of Indonesia Faction	Unity of Indonesia Faction and Golongan Karya Faction
Popular vote	31 (electoral vote)	20 (electoral vote)	4 (electoral vote)
Percentage	56.36%	36.36%	7.27%
Candidate	Anak Agung Gede Antara
Party	Golongan Karya Faction
Popular vote	0 (electoral vote)
Percentage	0%
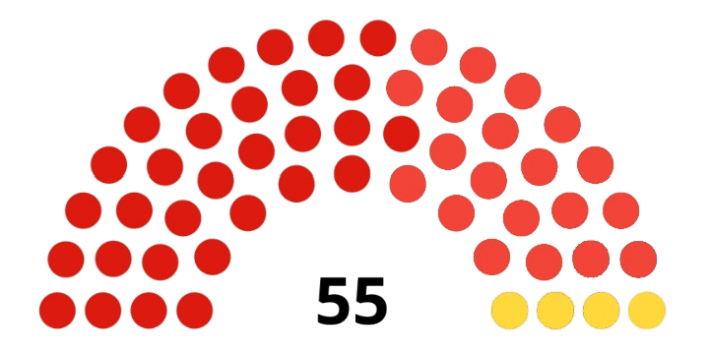
- Votes of the Bali Regional House of Representatives Dewa Made Bertha: 31 votes Tjokorda Gde Budi Suryawan: 20 votes Gede Ngurah Wididana: 4 votes
Governor before election
Dewa Made Beratha
PDI-p
Elected Governor
Dewa Made Beratha
PDI-P

Location map of Bali

The 2003 Bali gubernatorial election was held to determine the governor and vice governor of Bali for the five-year term (2003–2008). The election hearing took place on two different dates at the Bali Regional House of Representatives (DPRD) Building, Denpasar, namely the first process on July 30, 2003, and the second process on August 6, 2003. Incumbent governor Dewa Made Beratha from the Indonesian Democratic Party Struggle (PDI-P) Faction won this election with a majority of 31 electoral votes of out of 55 seats in the DPRD.

== Candidates ==
The 2003 Bali gubernatorial election featured four pairs of gubernatorial candidates, each of whom would present their vision and mission to the members of the Council in responding to various problems on the Island of the Gods. The four pairs of gubernatorial candidates were:

First Process (July 30, 2003)
No Urut	Candidates for Governor and Vice Governor		Support from Political Party Faction
1	Gede Ngurah Wididana	I Putu Gede Ary Suta	Kesatuan Indonesia Faction; Partai Golongan Karya Faction
1	Entrepreneurs	Chairman of BPPN (2002–2003)	Kesatuan Indonesia Faction; Partai Golongan Karya Faction
2	Dewa Made Beratha	I Gusti Ngurah Kesuma Kelakan	Faction Indonesian Democratic Party of Struggle
2	Governor of Bali (1998–2003)	Member of Bali Regional House of Representatives (1999–2003)	Faction Indonesian Democratic Party of Struggle

Second Process (August 6, 2003)
No. Sort	Candidate for Governor and Vice Governor		Support from Political Party Faction
1	Tjokorda Gde Budi Suryawan	Anak Agung Hardiana	Unity of Indonesia Faction
1	Regent of Gianyar (1993–2003)	Figures of Golkar Party Bali Province	Unity of Indonesia Faction
2	Anak Agung Gede Antara	Jro Gde Karang Tangkid Suwarsana	Golkar Party Faction
2	Balinese Figure	Founder of the Motherland Foundation	Golkar Party Faction

== Election results ==
In the second session of the Bali Regional House of Representatives, Dewa Made Beratha, with his deputy I Gusti Ngurah Kesuma Kelakan, were re-elected as Governor of Bali and Vice Governor of Bali for the 2003–2008 period. The pair were elected on the recommendation of the Central Leadership Council of the Indonesian Democratic Party of Struggle, with 31 votes or 56% out of a total of 55 house members in the Bali Regional House of Representatives (DPRD).
