= I Gusti Ngurah Made Agung =

King of Badung, Bali (1876–1906)

I Gusti Ngurah Made Agung ᬇᬕᬸᬲ᭄ᬢᬶᬗᬸᬭᬄᬫᬤᬾᬅᬕᬸᬂ
- Ida Tjokorda Ngurah Made Agung
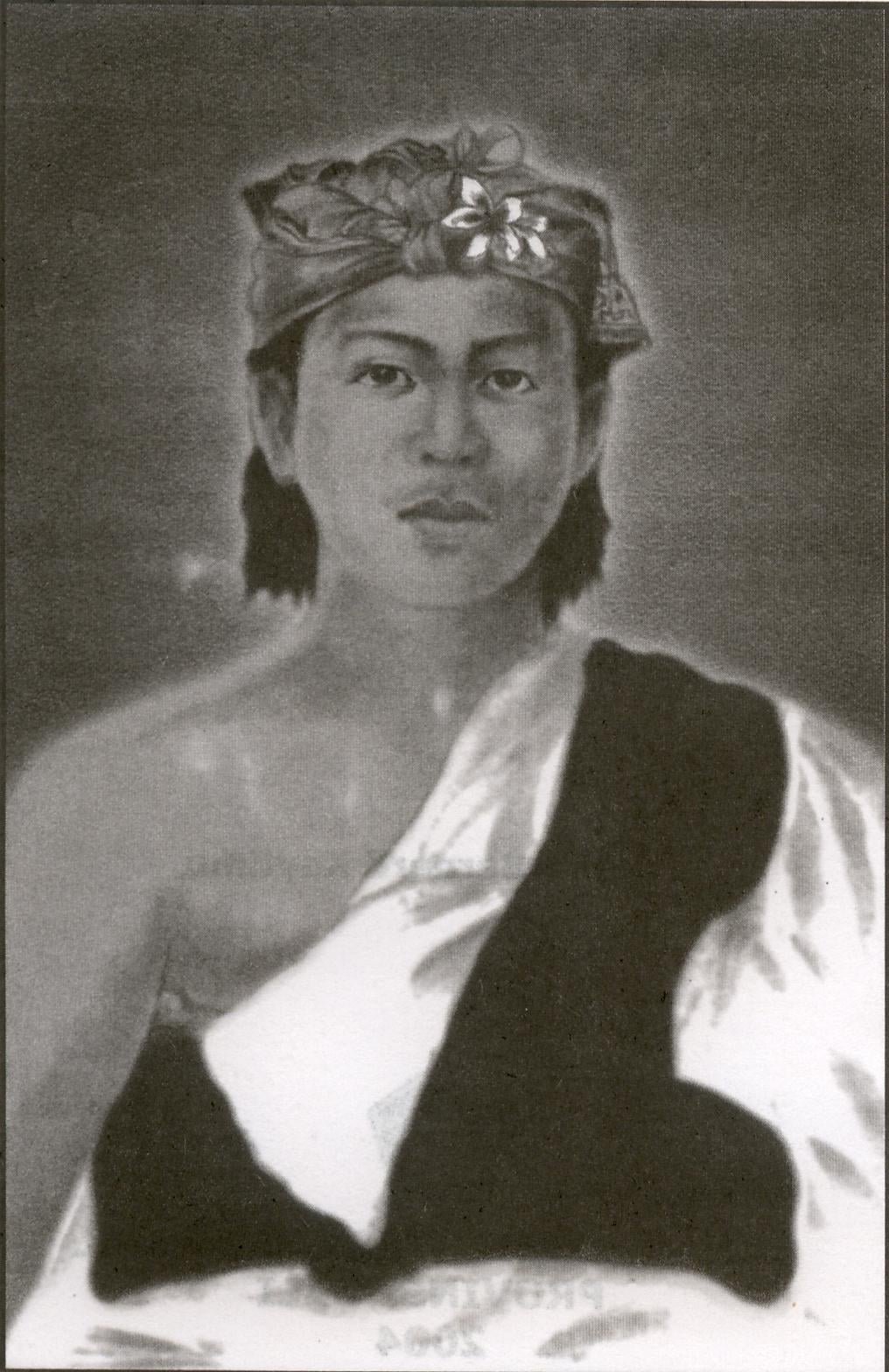
- I Gusti Ngurah Made Agung Raja Badung VI

6th King of Badung
- Reign: 1902 - 20 September 1906
- Coronation: 1902
- Predecessor: I Gusti Alit Ngurah Pemecutan
- Successor: I Gusti Alit Ngurah (Tjokorda Alit Ngurah)
- Born: 5 April 1876; Puri Agung Denpasar, Kingdom of Badung
- Died: 20 September 1906 (aged 30); Badung, Bali
Posthumous name
- Ida Tjokorda Mantuk Ring Rana ᬇᬤᬢ᭄ᬚᭀᬓᭀᬃᬤᬫᬦ᭄ᬢᬸᬓ᭄ᬭᬶᬂᬭᬦ
- House: Pemecutan
- Father: I Gusti Gede Ngurah Pemecutan (Raja Badung IV)
- Religion: Hinduism

I Gusti Ngurah Made Agung (Note: Balinese: ᬇᬕᬸᬲ᭄ᬢᬶᬗᬸᬭᬄᬫᬤᬾᬅᬕᬸᬂ) during his lifetime was titled Ida Tjokorda Ngurah Made Agung (Note: Balinese: ᬇᬤᬢ᭄ᬚᭀᬓᭀᬃᬤᬗᬸᬭᬄᬫᬤᬾᬅᬕᬸᬂ) or after his death was titled Ida Tjokorda Mantuk Ring Rana (Note: Balinese: ᬇᬤᬢ᭄ᬚᭀᬓᭀᬃᬤᬫᬦ᭄ᬢᬸᬓ᭄ᬭᬶᬂᬭᬦ) (5 April 1876 – 20 September 1906) was the 6th King of Badung, Bali who reigned from 1902 to 1906. He is the son of I Gusti Gede Ngurah Pemecutan who is the 4th king of Badung. During the Dutch Intervention era in Bali he was a fighter who opposed the Dutch East Indies government in Southern Bali. In 2015 he was appointed as a National Hero of Indonesia by the President of Indonesia Joko Widodo.

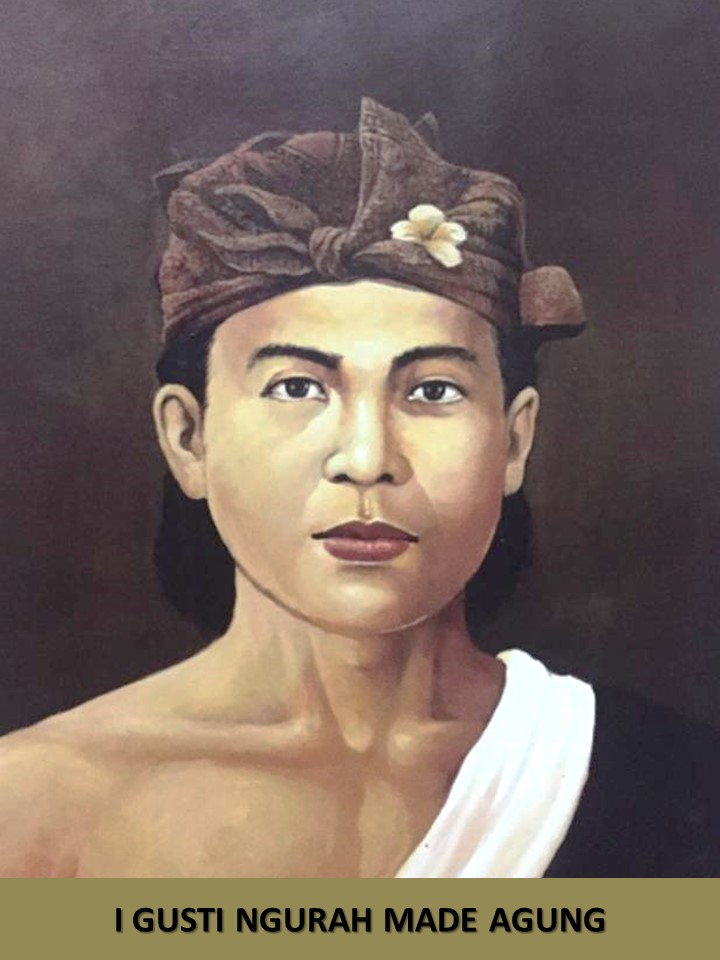
Sketch of I Gusti Ngurah Made Agung by the Ministry of Social Affairs of the Republic of Indonesia

He is also considered the 6th King of Denpasar.

== Coronation ==
In 1902, I Gusti Ngurah Made Agung was inaugurated as the 6th King, replacing the previous King, I Gusti Alit Ngurah Pemecutan.

In fact, the one who has the right to replace the late I Gusti Alit Ngurah Pemecutan is I Gusti Alit Ngurah (Tjokorda Alit Ngurah) who is the crown prince of King Denpasar V, but because he was only 6 years old at that time and not old enough to be crowned as King, the position of King was temporarily held by I Gusti Ngurah Made Agung who was the half-brother of King Denpasar V.

== 1906 Puputan Badung War ==
I Gusti Ngurah Made Agung opposed the Dutch East Indies colonialism when a merchant ship under the Dutch East Indies flag belonging to a Chinese trader named Kwee Tek Tjiang sailing from Banjarmasin on Sanur Beach in 1904 ran aground. The ship was named Sri Komala. The ship ran aground and caused great trouble in the Badung Kingdom because the King of Badung refused to follow the wishes of the ship owner who was supported by the Dutch East Indies Government in Batavia. In the incident, the people of Sanur were accused of stealing the contents of the ship, causing losses to the ship owner. The ship owner reported the incident to the Dutch East Indies Government and the Dutch East Indies Government demanded that the King of Badung be held responsible for the theft considering that the incident occurred in the territory of the Badung Kingdom. The King of Badung was demanded to pay compensation for the incident amounting to 3,000 silver dollars. The King of Badung rejected the unilateral claim of the Dutch East Indies Government because based on the confession of the Sanur People, the claim was not true and the Sanur people felt slandered by the Dutch East Indies Government.

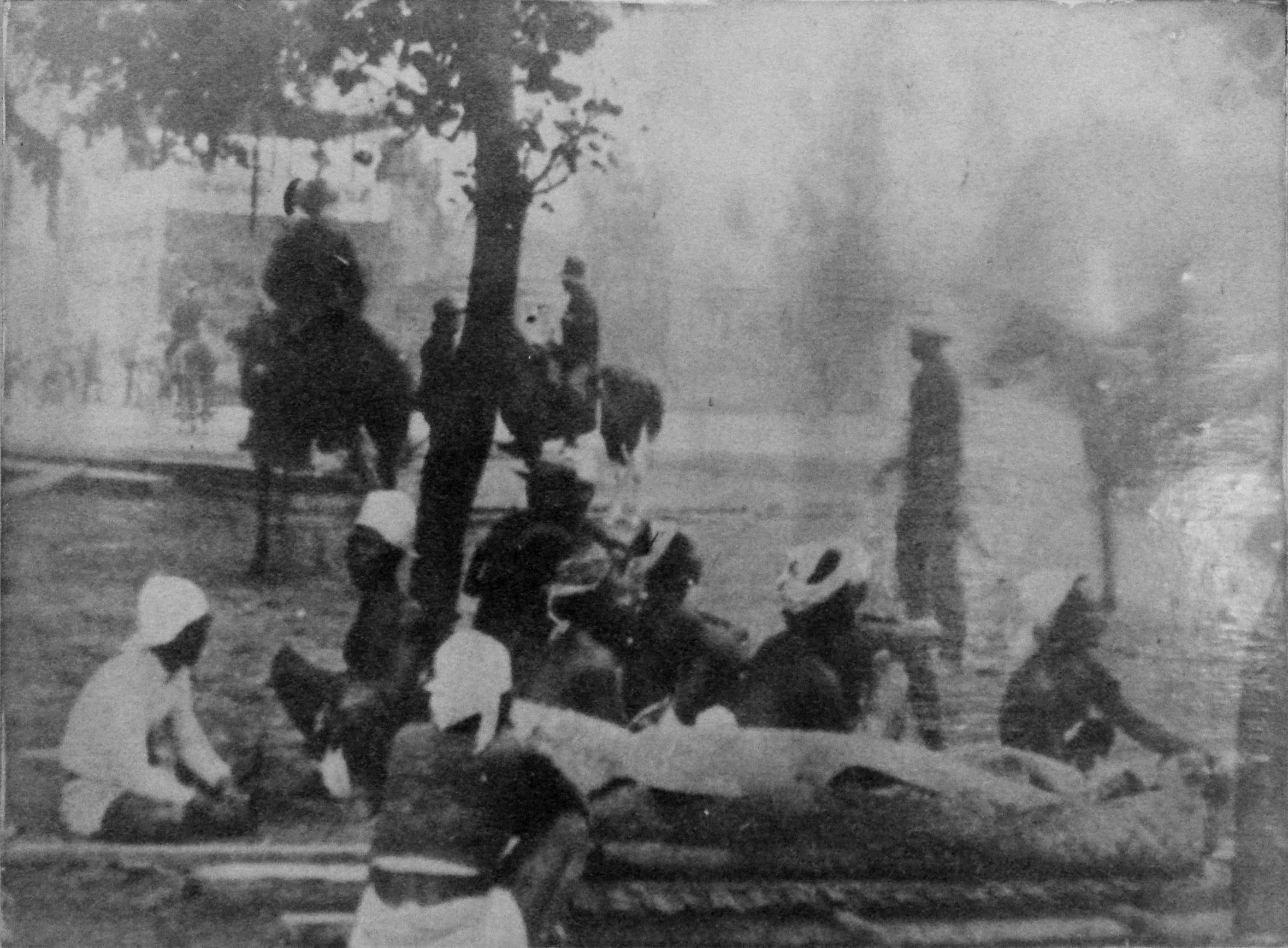
The body of I Gusti Ngurah Made Agung who died during the Puputan Badung war.

In September 1906, the Dutch East Indies Government formed a large army under the leadership of Major General M. B. Rost van Tonningen because the economic blockade failed to destroy the Badung Kingdom. The formation of this troop did not make I Gusti Ngurah Made Agung give up. Instead, he chose to fight against the Dutch troops until he died on the battlefield on September 20, 1906. This battle is better known as Puputan Badung.

== Awards ==
For his services, I Gusti Ngurah Made Agung was named a National Hero of Indonesia on November 5] 2015 based on Presidential Decree (Keppres) Number 116/TK/Year 2015 which was signed on Wednesday, November 4, 2015 by President Joko Widodo.

The Denpasar City Government immortalized the name of I Gusti Ngurah Made Agung through the name of the field which was formerly called "Puputan Badung Field" now called "I Gusti Ngurah Made Agung Field", where the Puputan Badung war took place in 1906.

The figure of I Gusti Ngurah Made Agung is also immortalized in a statue monument located at the intersection of Veteran-Patimura Street.

== Literature ==
In addition to being the King of Badung, I Gusti Ngurah Made Agung was also known as a great writer of his time. His literary works include Geguritan Dharma Sasana, Geguritan Niti Raja Sasana, Geguritan Nengah Jimbaran, Kidung Loda, Kakawin Atlas, and Geguritan Hredaya Sastra.

I Gusti Ngurah Made Agung is also known as the figure behind a very legendary and famous song among the Balinese people, namely Ratu Anom.
