= Gusti Ngurah Made Pemecutan =

I Gusti Ngurah Madé Pamecutan (Balinese: ᬇᬕᬸᬲ᭄ᬢᬶᬗᬸᬭᬄᬫᬤᬾᬧᬫᭂᬘᬸᬢᬦ᭄; also spelt Pemecutan, originally called I Gusti Ngurah Kaleran; died 1813 or 1817) was a King in Badung. He is created in nineteenth-century sources with establishing the kingdom of Denpasar (present day Badung and Denpasar). During his reign he successfully conquered Jembrana in the late 18th century.

The Badung dynasty was established in the first half of the eighteenth century by Gusti Ngurah Pamecutan Sakti, who in later legendary accounts is said to have had 500 wives. His descendants formed three rival branches of the family: Kaleran, Pamecutan and Satria. Gusti Ngurah Kaleran, together with his sister, Gusti Ngurah Putu Agung (aka Gusti Biang), plotted with the High Priest of the kingdom and the ruler of the neighbouring kingdom of Gianyar to overthrow the Satria line, led by Gusti Ngurah Jambe. Gusti Putu Agung was married to the head of Pamecutan branch of the family. In 1780, using a magic kris (dagger) made from a ball of iron from Java, Gusti Ngurah Kaleran killed Gusti Ngurah Jambe and razed his palace. Kaleran built a new palace, called Puri Denpasar (now known as Jaya Sabha Complex) to the south of Satria palace, thus founding the modern city of Denpasar. When he became ruler, Kaleran took on the name Gusti Ngurah Made Pamecutan. He ruled in conjunction with the head of the house of Pamecutan. After his death, his sister, Putu Agung, held power in the kingdom. The palace of Denpasar was destroyed in 1906 when the Dutch conquered Badung and neighbouring Tabanan.

Gusti Ngurah Pamecutan's three sons ruled in the palaces of Kesiman, Denpasar and Pamecutan.
