= Marinus Bernardus Rost van Tonningen =

Dutch military (1852–1927)

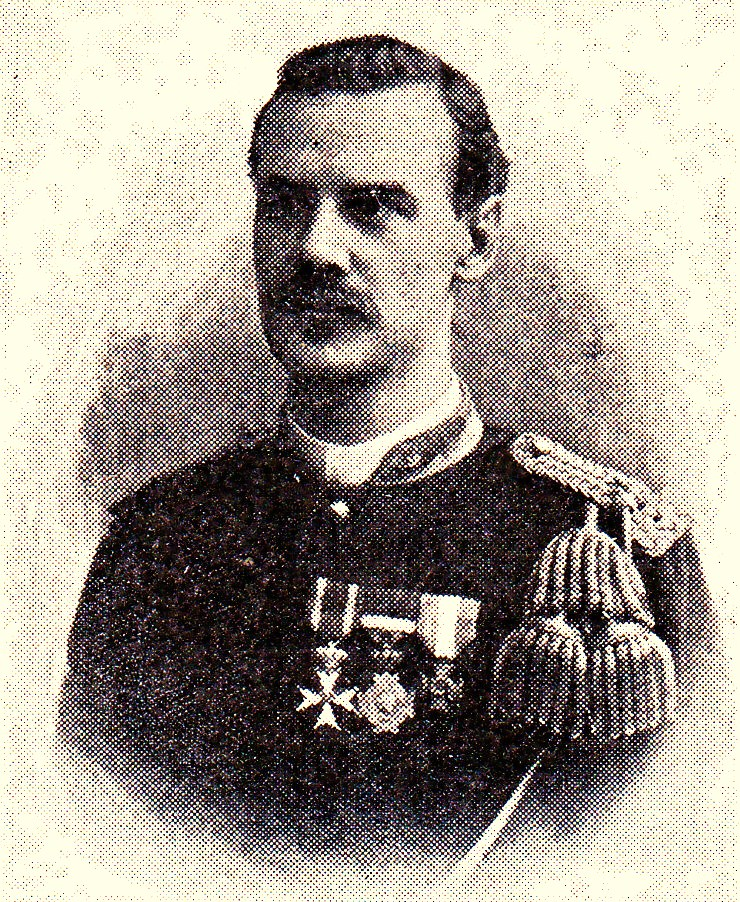
Rost van Tonningen as artillery major.

Marinus Bernardus Rost van Tonningen (October 24, 1852 in Paramaribo – January 7, 1927 in The Hague) was a major general in the Dutch Army and the Royal Dutch East Indies Army.

He is known for having commanded the Dutch intervention in Bali (1906) and the Dutch intervention in Bali (1908).

He was the father of Meinoud Rost van Tonningen.

== Awards and decorations ==
- Knight of the Order of the Netherlands Lion
- Honorary Sabre
- Expedition Cross with the clasp "Aceh 1873–1880"
- Lombok Cross
