= Pura Ulun Danu Batur =

Balinese Hindu temple in Indonesia

- ᬧᬸᬭᬉᬮᬸᬦ᭄ᬤᬦᬸᬩᬢᬸᬃ
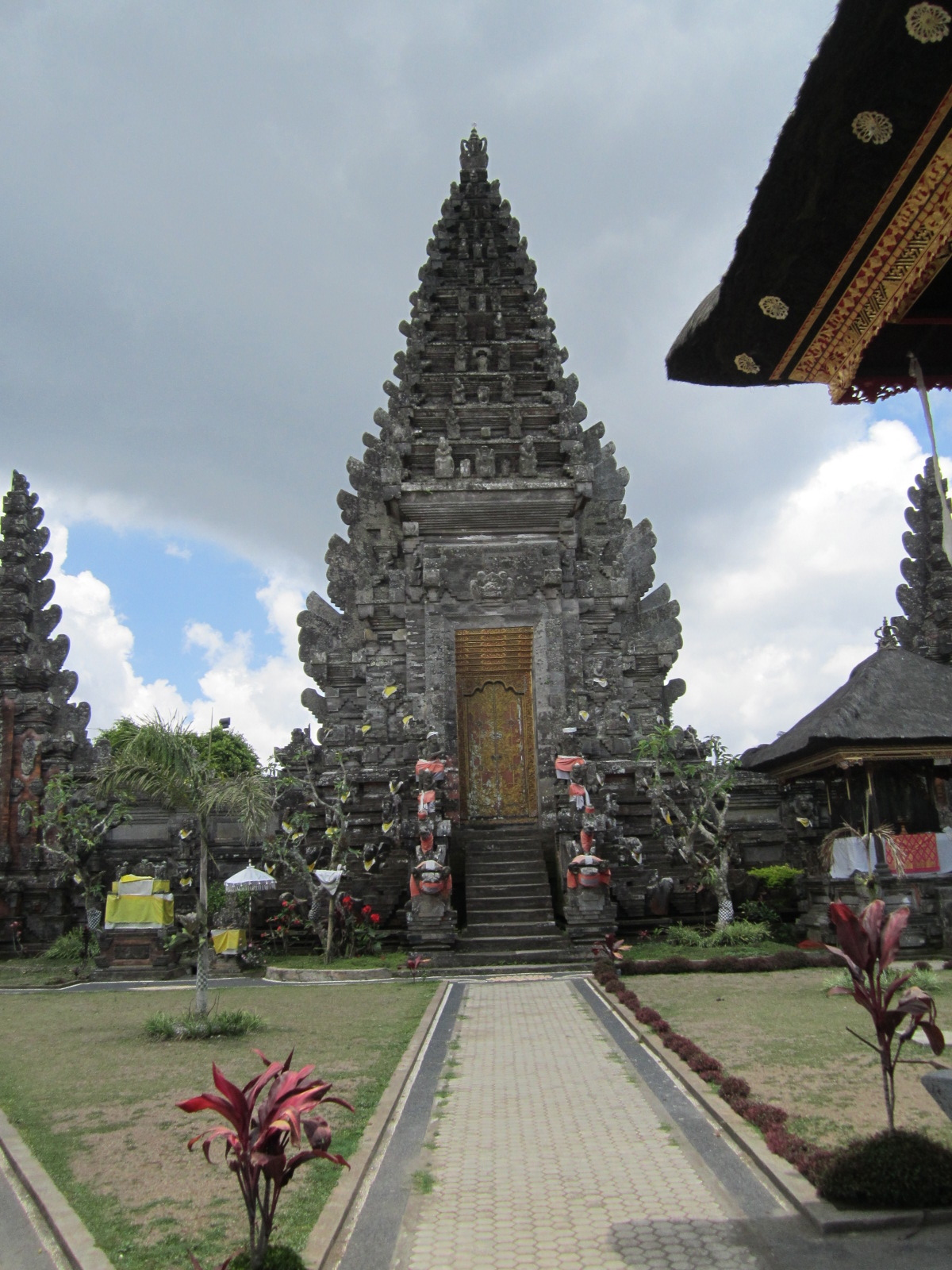
- The paduraksa (also kori agung) portal of Pura Ulun Danu Batur marking the entrance toward the innermost sanctum of the temple.
- Interactive map of the Pura Ulun Danu Batur area

General information
- Type: Pura
- Architectural style: Balinese
- Location: Jalan Kintamani, Batur Selatan, Bangli, Bali 80652
- Coordinates: 8.254719°S 115.335851°E
- Elevation: 1,459 metres (4,787 ft)
- Construction started: 17th-century
- Relocated: 1926

Pura Ulun Danu Batur (Balinese script: ᬧᬸᬭᬉᬮᬸᬦ᭄ᬤᬦᬸᬩᬢᬸᬃ, also known as "Pura Batur" or "Pura Ulun Danu") is a Hindu Balinese temple located on the island of Bali, Indonesia. As one of the Pura Kahyangan Jagat, Pura Ulun Danu Batur is one of the most important temples in Bali which acted as the maintainer of harmony and stability of the entire island. Pura Ulun Danu Batur represents the direction of the North and is dedicated to the god Vishnu and the local goddess Dewi Danu, goddess of Lake Batur, the largest lake in Bali. Following the destruction of the original temple compound, the temple was relocated and rebuilt in 1926. The temple, along with 3 other sites in Bali, form the Cultural Landscape of Bali Province which was inscribed as a World Heritage Site by UNESCO in 2012.

== Batur village ==
Batur village is located near the caldera of Mount Batur. The village is divided into three perbekelan (administrative division), namely Batur Utara (north), Batur Tengah (middle), and Batur Selatan (south). The villagers make their living as farmers, craftsmen, tradesmen, government workers, and in the tourism industry.

== History ==
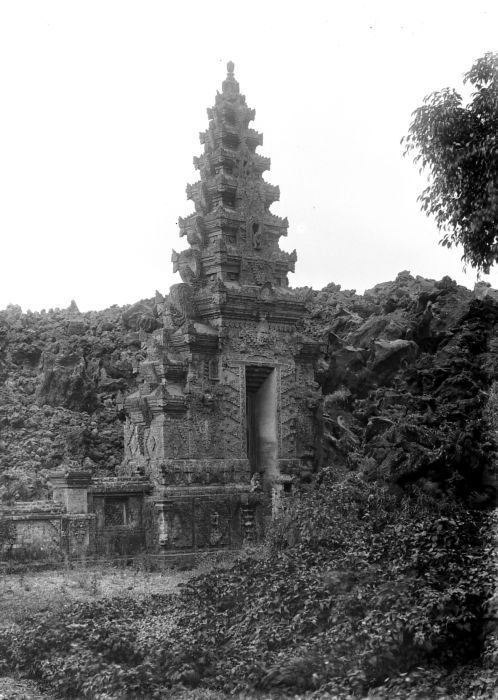
The black lava of Mount Batur almost engulfed the kori agung of Pura Batur's original compound in the eruption of 1926.

Pura Batur or Pura Ulun Danu was first established in the 17th century. The temple was dedicated to the god Vishnu and the goddess of the lake Dewi Danu. Lake Batur, the largest lake in Bali, is considered to be of utmost importance on the island of Bali as the primary water source for agricultural activities in Bali. The word Pura means "temple", while the two words ulun ("head" or "source") and danu ("lake", referring to Lake Batur) are translated as "lake source"; and so the temple name means "Lake Source Temple". The word batur, after the village of Batur where the temple is located, means "pure" or "spiritually clean". The definition of Pura Ulun Danu illustrates the significance of the water for the prosperity of the villagers of Batur and for the entire Bali's Hindu community, especially in watering the island's rice paddy fields.

Pura Ulun Danu Batur was mentioned several times in several ancient lontars as one of the sad kahyangan, the six groups of universal Pura.

Before the eruption of Mount Batur in 1917, Pura Batur and the original village (then known as Karang Anyar, meaning "New Area") were located at the southwest base of Mount Batur itself. The lava flow of the 1917 eruption caused thousands of casualties. Despite the destruction, the black lava flow stopped at the gates of Pura Ulun Danu Batur. Because the lava stopped before reaching the temple, the Balinese people saw this as a good omen and decided to stay in the area.

On August 3, 1926, Mount Batur erupted again, this time devastating the entire village of Karang Anyar, although according to reports at the time, "the population was saved." The lava also advanced toward the temple, covering almost the entire compound. Despite the destruction of the village, the 11-tiered main shrine of the temple survived. With the area surrounding Mount Batur declared uninhabitable during the eruption period, the villagers of Kalang Anyar had to relocate. The relocation process was helped by villagers from the surrounding area e.g. Desa Bayung, Tunggiran, Kedisan, Buanan, and Sekardadi. The Dutch Indies government sent in the Bangli regional army and some prisoners to help with the relocation. The surviving 11-tiered shrine was transported to a new location, as well as other important heirlooms of the temple. Among the sacred heirloom of the temple was the gamelan of Pura Batur, which was transported into a special bale at a Pura in Desa Bayung; and a guardian spirit figure (Bhatara Gede) which was transported to another village so that the residents could still worship it during the time of the resettlement.

After a few days, a village rebuilding program was initiated by the Bangli regional government. Funds were collected to construct new houses, administrative offices, and basic infrastructure. After several months, the area surrounding Mount Batur was declared safe, and the village rebuilding program could start immediately. A new location for the village was chosen, this time uphill on the outer rim of Lake Batur's caldera. Land parcels were distributed according to the number of the original families. The entire process was watched by local police officials (mantri polisi) to maintain order. With the completion of the houses and basic infrastructure, the Bangli regional government collected another fund to build a new temple, the present Pura Ulun Danu Batur. With the completion of the temple in 1926, the temple's gamelan and the guardian spirit figure were returned to its temple. A ceremony was enacted to carry the reunification of the gamelan and the guardian figure into its temple, as well as a cleansing ceremony for the heirloom objects and the new temple.

== Temple compound ==
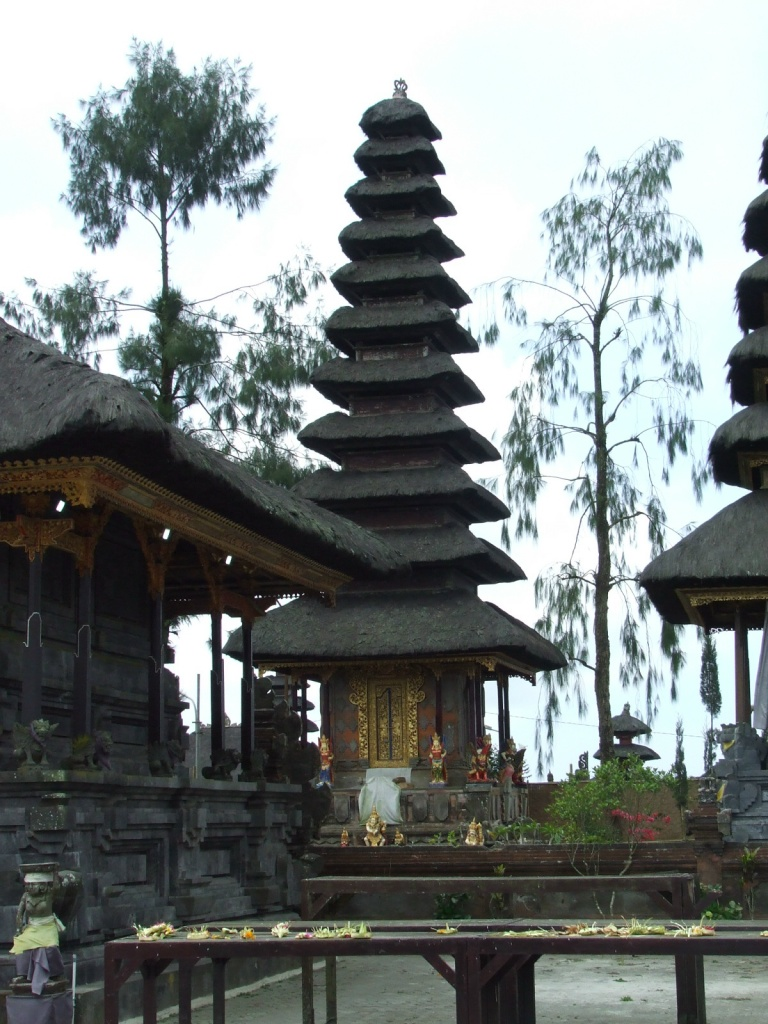
The 11-tiered Meru tower (pelinggih) of the inner sanctum of Pura Penataran Agung Batur.

Pura Batur comprises nine different temples, containing in total of 285 shrines and pavilions dedicated to the gods and goddesses of water, agriculture, holy springs, art, crafts, and more. Pura Penataran Agung Batur, the principal temple, has five main courtyards. Its most dominant shrines are the 11-tiered meru situated in the inner and most sacred courtyard, three 9-tiered merus dedicated to Mount Batur, Mount Abang, and Ida Batara Dalem Waturenggong, the deified king of the Gelgel dynasty who ruled from 1460 to 1550. The eight other temples are Penataran Pura Jati, Pura Tirta Bungkah, Pura Taman Sari, Pura Tirta Mas Mampeh, Pura Sampian Wangi, Pura Gunarali, Pura Padang Sila, and Pura Tuluk Biyu.

The main temple Pura Penataran Agung Batur, is divided into three areas: the outer sanctum of the temple (jaba pisan or nistaning mandala), the middle sanctum (jaba tengah or madya mandala), and the inner main sanctum (jero or utamaning mandala).

The main shrine of Pura Ulun Danu Batur is located in the inner sanctum (jero). The main shrine is an 11-tiered meru shrine dedicated to Shiva and his consort Parvati.

== Festival ==
The odalan (main feast) of Pura Ulun Danu Batur takes place on the 10th full moon in a year (Purnama of Sasih Kedasa) according to the Balinese calendar, which usually falls in late March to early April.

== See also ==
- Balinese temple

== Cited works ==
- Auger, Timothy, ed. (2001). Bali & Lombok. Eyewitness Travel Guides. London: Dorling Kindersley. ISBN 0751368709.
- Stuart-Fox, David (1999). Fox, James J. (ed.). Religion and Ritual: Balinese Hindu Temples. Indonesian Heritage. Singapore: Archipelago Press. ISBN 9813018585.
- Hood, Made Mantle (2010). Triguna: A Hindu-Balinese Philosophy for Gamelan Gong Gede Music. SoundCultureStudies. Vol. 2. Münster: LIT Verlag. ISBN 9783825812300.
- Ketut Gobyah; Jro Mangku I Ketut Riana (2018). "Pura Ulun Danu Batur". Babad Bali. Yayasan Bali Galang. Archived from the original on November 22, 2017.
