= Subak (irrigation) =

Balinese irrigation system

UNESCO World Heritage Site
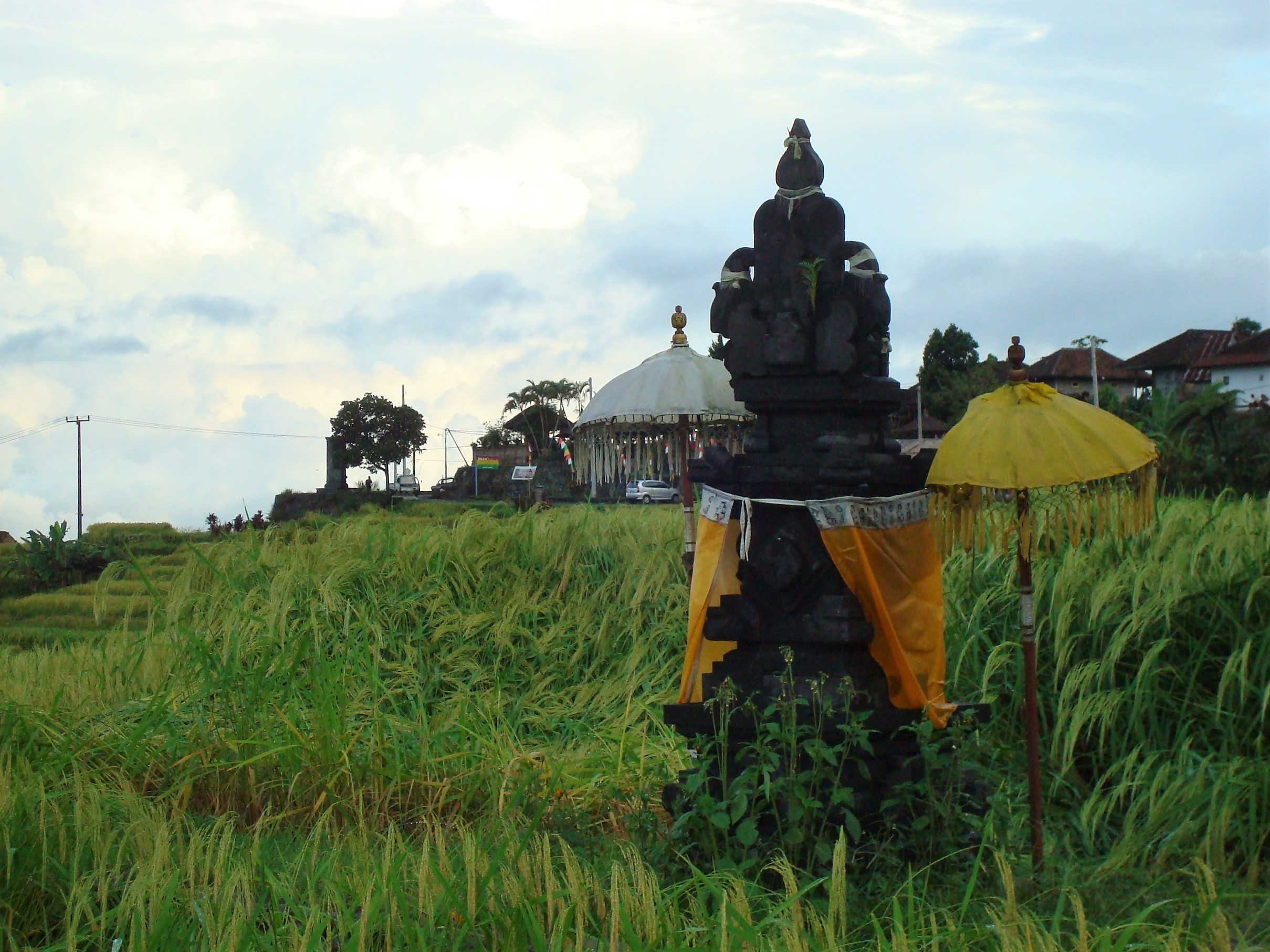
- Balinese altar at rice terraces near Mount Batukaru, Tabanan Regency

- Location within Bali Location within Indonesia
- Official name: Cultural Landscape of Bali Province: the Subak System as a Manifestation of the Tri Hita Karana Philosophy
- Location: Bali, Indonesia
- Includes: 1. Supreme Water Temple Pura Ulun Danu Batur; 2. Lake Batur; 3. Subak Landscape of Pekerisan Watershed; 4. Subak Landscape of Catur Angga Batukaru; 5. Royal Water Temple Pura Taman Ayun
- Criteria: Cultural: (iii), (v), (vi)
- Reference: 1194rev
- Inscription: 2012 (36th Session)
- Area: 19,519.9 ha (48,235 acres)
- Buffer zone: 1,454.8 ha (3,595 acres)
- Coordinates: 8°15′33″S 115°24′10″E

Subak is the water management (irrigation) system for the paddy fields on Bali island, Indonesia. It was developed in the 9th century. For the Balinese, irrigation is not simply providing water for the plant's roots, but water is used to construct a complex, pulsed artificial ecosystem that is at the same time autonomous and interdependent. The system consists of terraced rice fields and water temples covering nearly 20,000 hectares (49,000 acres). The temples are the main focus of this cooperative water management, known as subak.

== History and etymology ==
The subak system was started some time during the 9th century, when political Bali was a patchwork of kingdoms - which gives food for thought on both aspects: the physical feat of creating such a wondrous landscape, and the profound social impact from the cooperation it imposed as a sine qua non between entities such as kingdoms.

The first known written record dates from around the 11th century: a text from that period cites it under the name kasuwakara, which later became suwak and then subak. But other documents from the same period mention that the system is linked to the Besakih Temple, which suggests that subak predates the 11th century.

== Structure and organisation of the subak system ==
Subak is a traditional, ecologically sustainable irrigation system that binds Balinese agrarian society together within the village's bale banjar (Note: Traditional villages, or pakraman villages, have several smaller territories called banjar whose members are called adat banjar. Membership of traditional banjar is mandatory for married people who live in the territory of the banjar. Residents who live far away can still become members and are bound by the banjar regulations of their home villages. Eachbanjar is headed by a prajuru (administrator or administrative body) and operates according to regulations called awig-awig agreed upon by the krama banjar (assembly of members of the banjar, calculated on the basis of the "small family" or batih family consisting of father, mother and child). Each banjar has its particular structure and number of administrators. It is headed by a kelian banjar, of which there is only one per banjar. Some banjar may also have a petajuh, whose function is to help the kelian banjar as a clerk; a kesinoman (interpreter), who serves as a sort of "liaison officer" between the kelian banjar and the krama banjar. The bale banjar is the meeting place for the banjar and serves as a socio-cultural public space or communal space where people interact and engage in cultural and educational activities. It is a place to hold traditional meetings (sangkep / paruman), to prepare ceremonies and their infrastructure, to perform arts (dancing, beating, mekidung) practiced by banjar residents, but also merely to relax, chat, run hobbies (including cock fighting), or even simply lie down to rest. As such the bale banjar holds a prime role in bonding the community, reinforcing its sense of “togetherness”, of social solidarity and the internalization of cultural values The functions of the banjar have expanded with the emergence of capitalist economics, particularly in urban areas with their rapid population growth and high demand for economic space. This is particularly true of such places as Denpasar and tourism-based Kuta (Badung), Sanur and Ubud, although it is not so marked in more rural areas. For example, several bale banjar in Denpasar have developed wholesalers activities, fruit markets, shops and doctors' practices. Seven of the nine traditional banjar in Sesetan are also used as savings and loan offices; one of them, the Ubung Binoh Kelod banjar, doubles up as a fitness gym. This can be pushed so far as to denature the role of the bale benjar: in banjar Kereneng (Denpasar), the first and second floors of the bale banjar are rented to the Agung Salon, so there is practically no space left to carry out social activities; in banjar Piakan (Ubung area), the first of the two floors of the bale banjar was originally contracted to a motorbike show room and is now contracted to Alfamart; some bale banjar in Kuta, Kerobokan, and Dalung, are used to sell souvenirs and as garages.) (community center) and Balinese temples.

Subak components are the forests that protect and funnel the water supply; the terraced paddies or rice fields landscape; the system of canals, tunnels and weirs; the temples of varying size and importance that mark either the source of water or its passage through the temple on its way downhill to irrigate subak land — each of these temples corresponding to a drainage basin. Rice, the water network required to grow rice, and the subak cooperative that controls that water network, have together shaped the landscape over the past thousand years.

As of 2019 the number of subak is estimated at 1,559. (Note: In 1996 a publication cites “about 1,300 subak in Bali, covering approximately 110,000 hectares, while the size of one subak ranges from a few ha to almost 800 ha, with an average of about 100 ha”.) Between 50 and 400 farmers manage the water supply from one source of water.

The traditional schedules have important effects on both water sharing and pest control. The logistics of the traditional system of water sharing mean that the farmers must synchronize their crops. This creates brief fallow periods over large areas and deprives pest populations of their habitat, thus considerably reducing their numbers and maintaining these at a sustainable level. The success of fallow periods as a pest control technique depends on the extent and duration of the fallow period: all of the fields in a large area must be fallow at the same time; if not so, the pests can move from field to field. But at the same time, the synchronized area must not be too large so as to not create unsustainable peaks of water demand. Thus the subak system optimizes the tradeoffs between water sharing and pest control.
The optimal solution for this trade-off depends on local conditions: it varies from region to region. If there is plenty of water at all times, a uniform cropping pattern will produce the highest rice yields by minimizing pest damage. But if water is limited, some offsetting of planting dates may produce the best yields.

This also means that each farmer's best interest is also the best interest for all farmers of the same subak - in particular the farmers higher up, who are not limited in water but need appropriate timing from the farmers downstream to not see their own crops devoured by pests.

=== Practical and spiritual relationship ===
Water management is intimately linked to the authority of the priests in water temples, who practice the Tri Hita Karana philosophy, a self-described relationship between humans, the earth and the gods - in other words the human world, the world of nature and the spiritual world. Their inspiration is based on several different ancient religious traditions, including Shaiva Siddhanta and Samkhyā Hinduism, Vajrayana Buddhism, and Austronesian cosmology.

The overall subak system exemplifies this philosophical principle. Water temple rituals promote a harmonious relationship between people and their environment through the active engagement of people, emphasizing the dependence on the life-sustaining forces of the natural world. Rice is seen as the gift of gods; the subak system is part of temple culture - and reciprocally.

Pura Ulun Danu Batur

The supreme water temple of the island is the Pura Ulun Danu Batur temple on the shore of Lake Batur, the crater lake of Mount Batur volcano. The Balinese people consider it as the primary source of all springs and rivers on the island. Moreover, all the other water temples on Bali, who serve a similar purpose in the network, are considered to be linked to this temple — in the same way that all temples are linked to the Mother Temple Besakih.

== Vocabulary associated with the subak system ==
Each subak generally has its own name and organizational structure. Concerning the latter, here are listed some of the commons terms for the various levels of practical administration:

- Krama subak : the subak members (krama adat are the villagers.)
- Subak prajuru : management of the subak :
  - A small subak is headed by a chairman alone, called kelihan subak or pekaseh.
  - The prajuru of a larger subak includes a pekaseh (chairman); a petajuh (vice-chairman); a penyarikan or juru tulis or juru surat (secretary); a patengen / petengen or juru raksa (treasurer); a kasinoman or juru arah (distributor of information); a saya (special assistant related to religious activities),; a pangliman (supervisor of the division of water in the subak).
  - Very large subak, or several subak, are called subak gede, headed by a pekaseh gede and a deputy pekaseh gede. The pekaseh gede organizes the water management between subak, according to the nyorog system: all the subak in a subak gede are divided into 3 groups, upstream, middle and downstream; the ngulu, or subak group upstream, is first to receive the water; the maongin, or subak group in the middle, receives it next; and the ngasep, or subak group downstream, receives it last. The farmers in each group time the preparation of their land accordingly and the whole process is spread over 2 weeks or thereabout.
- A subak can be subdivided into smaller parts called tempek / munduk and led by a kelihan tempek / munduk, with less jurisdiction than the pekaseh.
- Paruman krama subak : a meeting of subak members. The paruman krama decides of the day when the water is made to flow from the river to the irrigation channel - an act marked with a ceremony mapag toya conducted at the temple near the concerned weir. The meeting is held in a subak hall built in the middle of the subak area. It is also the opportunity to plan for various activities such as repairs to the irrigation channels, the beginning of soil cultivation, of seed planting, etc. - and of the rituals that accompany each of these activities. The prajuru must also consult with other parties involved, notably the government.
- awig-awig : regulations - here of the subak -, decided by the prajuru; there are also perarem (additional rules) and paswara (meeting decision).
- Kerta masa period: period of rice planting during the rainy season.
- Gadon period: period of rice planting during the dry season. During gadon, the water supply is provided to each in turn upon decision of the pangliman.
- Palawija period: this corresponds to the gadon but applies to places with a particularly dry climate, where planting crops other than rice is authorized due to water limitations; soybeans are the main replacement crop but farmers can choose what to plant in their fields (peanuts, corn, flowers, etc.).

== History and ongoing threats ==
=== The failure of the “Green Revolution” ===
Indonesia had to import yearly almost a million tons of rice during the 1950s. The “Green Revolution”, promising higher yields in rice, was therefore very well received: in 1967 the government launched the Bimbingan massal (BIMAS), or “massive guidance” program, which reached Bali in 1971. Farmers were provided with high-yielding rice seeds and easy access to fertilizers and pesticides, and encouraged to grow three crops a year since the new rice varieties grew faster than the native crops. Legal penalties compelled farmers to plant the new rice seeds that demanded year-round irrigation. Three years later, in 1974, started the reports of “chaos in water scheduling” and “explosions of rice pests.” Still, the “Green Revolution rice” covered 70% of the rice terraces in South Bali by 1977 and the Asian Development Bank began at about the same time a major irrigation development project in Bali, while promoting the use of pesticides rather than synchronizing fallow periods to control pests. This led to up to 50% of crop losses due to pests in the late 1970s, when subaks planted rice continuously and cropping patterns were very disorganized. In 1988, a study by World Bank officials reported that the use of pesticides had “pervasively polluted the island's soil and water resources.” That same year the Indonesian government at last recognized the crisis and refused to follow the World Bank directives any further; Suharto revoked his own government's directives, the subak system regained its power of decision over the agriculture, farmers went back to coordinated planting and crops began to recover.

=== Present threats ===
The subak system is presently challenged by a number of factors, including: the small size of individual properties that limits the farmers' ability to attain a decent living; the ageing of subak members, with an age average over 40 years-old in 2019; the decreasing quantity of water resources and pollution; the heavy financial burden on the farmers for carrying out subak activities; and the national government promulgating unclear regulations concerning the irrigation, including traditional irrigations. Since about 2010, farmers can be exempted from the payment of rice taxes and may be assisted with crop insurance, in a bid to encourage the continuation of rice plantations. Since 2018, prajuru that are grouped in a sustainable subak scheme receive monthly incentives of Rp. 1,500,000 (about US$100) for the pekaseh and Rp. 650,000 (approximately US$40) for the petajuh / pangliman, to help them work diligently in managing the various needs and problems faced by subaks. Farming equipment such as tractors and subsidies for fertilizers, seeds, and pesticides required by subak are facilitated through the Joint Farmers Groups (gapoktan) or Service Facilities Units (UPS) established by the prajuru and the krama subak.

Loss of land

The highest threat concerns the rice fields that are closest to areas undergoing fast development in such sectors as commercial, housing, industry and other infrastructure development. The land has become a commodity and a subject of speculation. The subak near Denpasar are particularly affected: in 1993 their surfaces totaled 5,753.43 hectares (14,217.0 acres); in 2006 there remained only 2,717 hectares (6,710 acres) - this last figure was maintained up until 2014, with 935 hectares (2,310 acres) in South Denpasar, 726 hectares (1,790 acres) in East Denpasar, 284 hectares (700 acres) in West Denpasar and 772 hectares (1,910 acres) in North Denpasar. But by 2018 nearly 300 hectares (740 acres) were lost again, down to 2,444 hectares (6,040 acres). An average of 20 to 30 ha of agricultural land is lost each year in that area, and around 1,000 hectares (2,500 acres) / year in the whole of Bali. Beyond the agricultural necessity, landscape and culture negatively affected by uncontrolled tourism are heading fast towards a situation where “tourism kills tourism”.

In the case of Denpasar, the local government is working on the city to be listed as a Heritage City (Kota Pusaka) and the maintenance of the local subak system is part of that effort. The status of Heritage City would drastically reduce the conversion of rice fields into other land uses and would be a considerable help in maintaining the remaining subak. The prajuru have also started introducing a new regulation that prohibits changing the use of the land following a sale.

Water diverted to tourism and polluted

Water pollution and freshwater scarcity have also become major threats, and not just to the subak. Water is diverted from agriculture to tourism and the mass tourism industry has become the largest consumer of water, consuming 65% of freshwater in Bali and having lowered the island's water table by some 60%. Water supplies have reached a critical stage, with water shortage “directly linked to loss of cultivated land.” It is not only a matter of quantity but also of quality: lower water table means that salt water is due to fill that gap because of the constant enormous pressure from the ocean onto the land. This is already happening: as of 2020, some people in Denpasar have had to leave their ancestral home because their well's water has become salty. An article from December 2019 signals that this diversion of water to urban areas and overuse of groundwater by hotels is disrupting the subak's water system.

== World Heritage Site status ==
On 6 July 2012, subak was listed as a UNESCO World Heritage Site under the title "Cultural Landscape of Bali Province: the Subak System as a Manifestation of the Tri Hita Karana Philosophy". This Unesco Site includes five sites that demonstrate the interconnected natural, religious, and cultural components of the traditional subak system:

- the subak landscape of Catur Angga Baturkaru: 17,376.1 hectares (42,937 acres) with a buffer zone of 974.4 hectares (2,408 acres), its terraces mentioned in a 10th-century inscription making them amongst the oldest in Bali and prime examples of Classical Balinese temple architecture;
- Lake Batur: 1,606.4 hectares (3,970 acres) with a buffer zone of 210 hectares (520 acres), regarded as the ultimate origin of every spring and river, most notably with the Pura Ulun Danu Batur sitting on the shores of the crater lake and to which all other subak temples are linked;
- the subak landscape of Pakerisan river watershed: 529.1 hectares (1,307 acres) with a buffer zone of 188 hectares (460 acres), the oldest known irrigation system in Bali;
- the Royal water temple of Taman Ayun: 6.9 hectares (17 acres) with a buffer zone of 51.3 hectares (127 acres), according to Unesco "the largest and most architecturally distinguished regional water temple", "exemplifying the fullest expansion of the subak system under the largest Bali Kingdom of the 17th century" - although it governs only 3 subak systems;
- the Supreme water temple Pura Ulun Danu Batur: 1.4 hectares (3.5 acres) with a buffer zone of 31.1 hectares (77 acres), on the edge of Mount Batur crater lake.

The total surface of the Unesco site cores is 19,519.3 hectares (48,233 acres), adding buffer zones of 1,454.8 hectares (3,595 acres).

In 2008, during the evaluation of the proposition by the World Heritage Committee, the rice terraces of the original Jatiluwih (Note: Jatiluwih rice terrases are in the surroundings of Gunungsari, in Tabanan Regency, 24 kilometres (15 mi) north of Tabanan and 22 kilometres (14 mi) south of Bedugul. Jatiluwih is an administrative village formed with two customary villages, Gunung Sari and Jatiluwih. Under these two customary villages there are seven customary hamlets or banjar.) site was vastly expanded; it was renamed "Subak Landscape of Catur Angga Batukaru" and now includes 17 subak gede institutions, 12 customary villages, the two lakes of Tamblingan and Buyan, and forest areas of Batukaru natural reserves across the two districts of Tabanan and Buleleng - all of which are ecologically and culturally connected to the Jatiluwih terrasses.

== Museum ==
In 1981, the Subak Museum opened in Tabanan Regency.

== Gallery ==
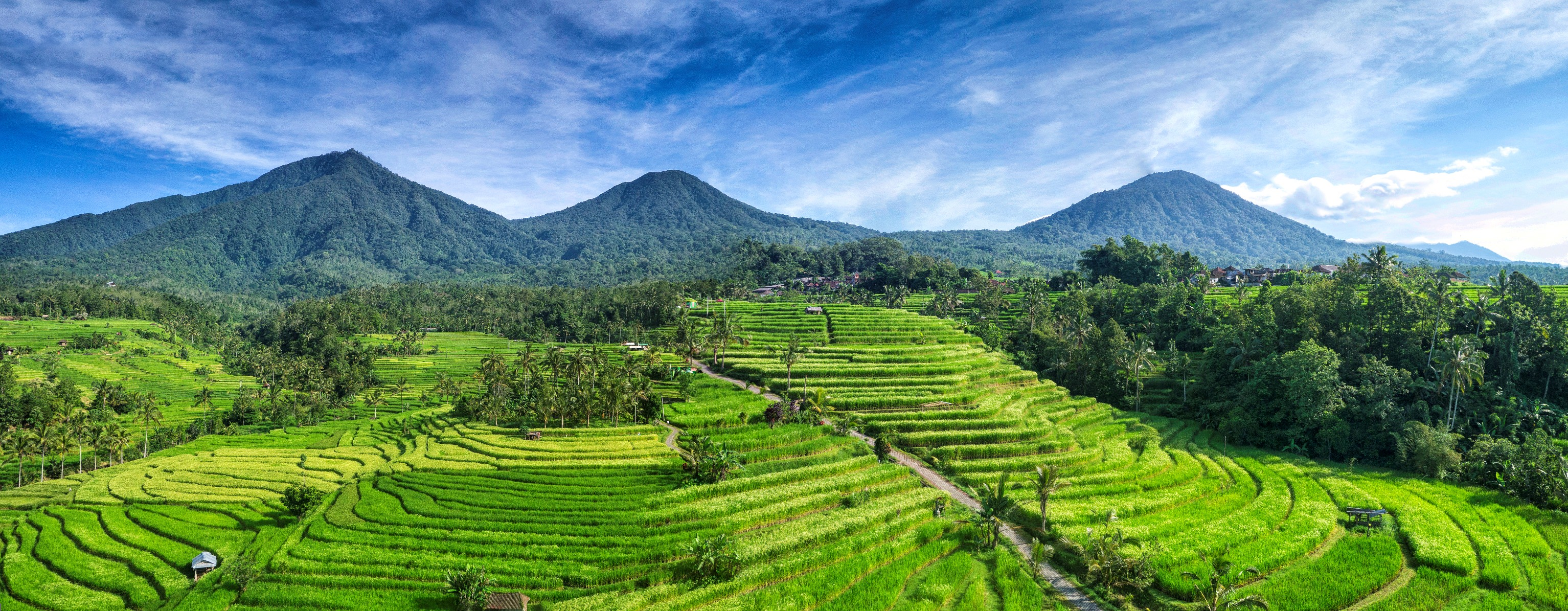
Jatiluwih rice terraces
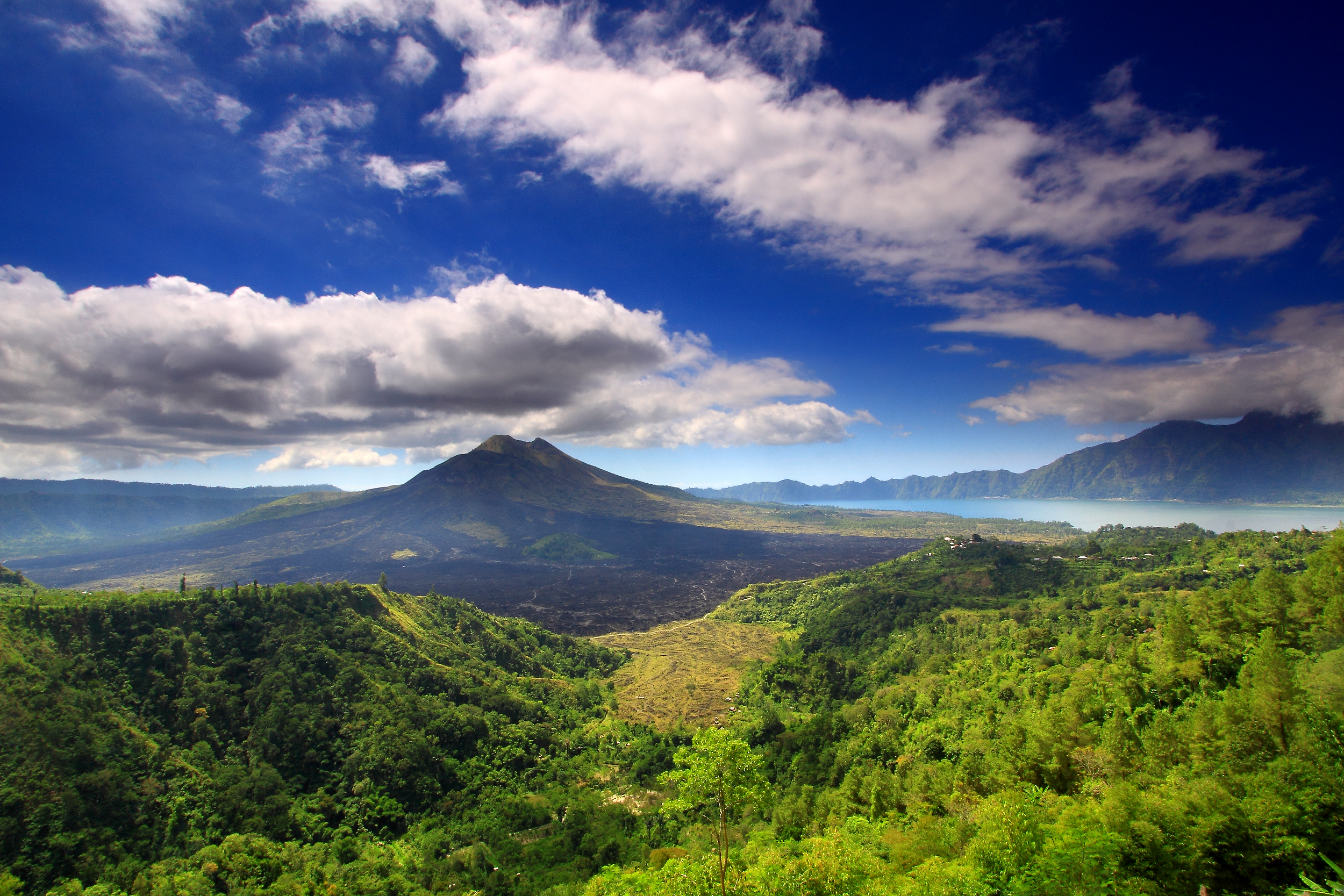
Lake Batur

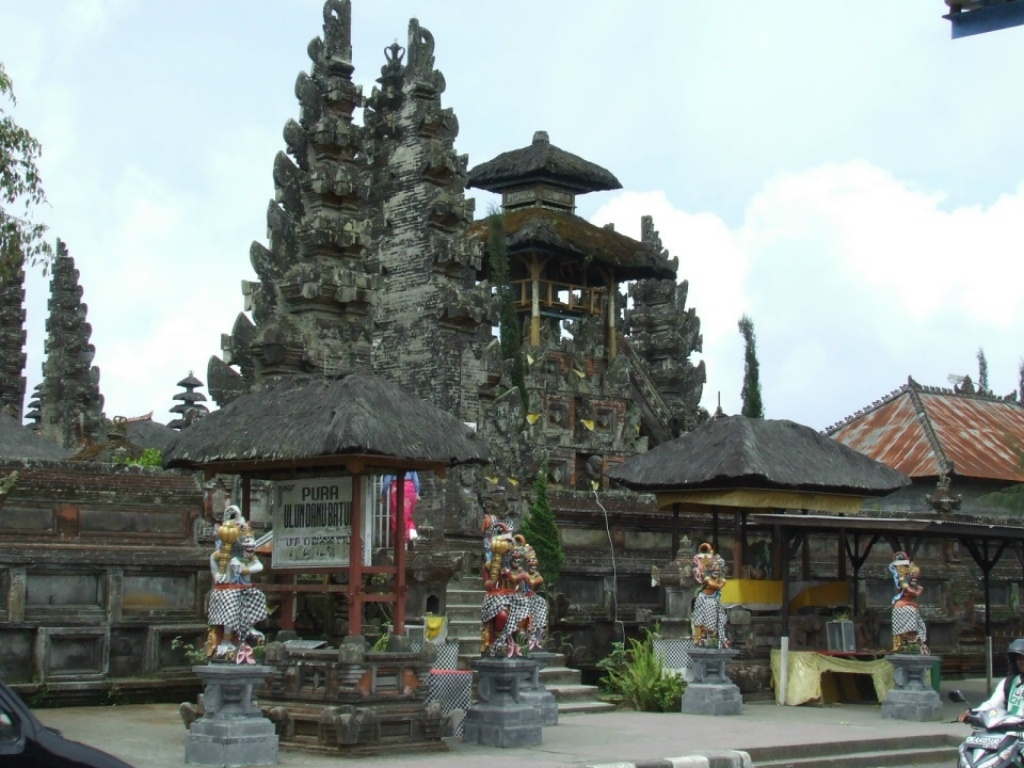
Ulun Danu Batur Temple

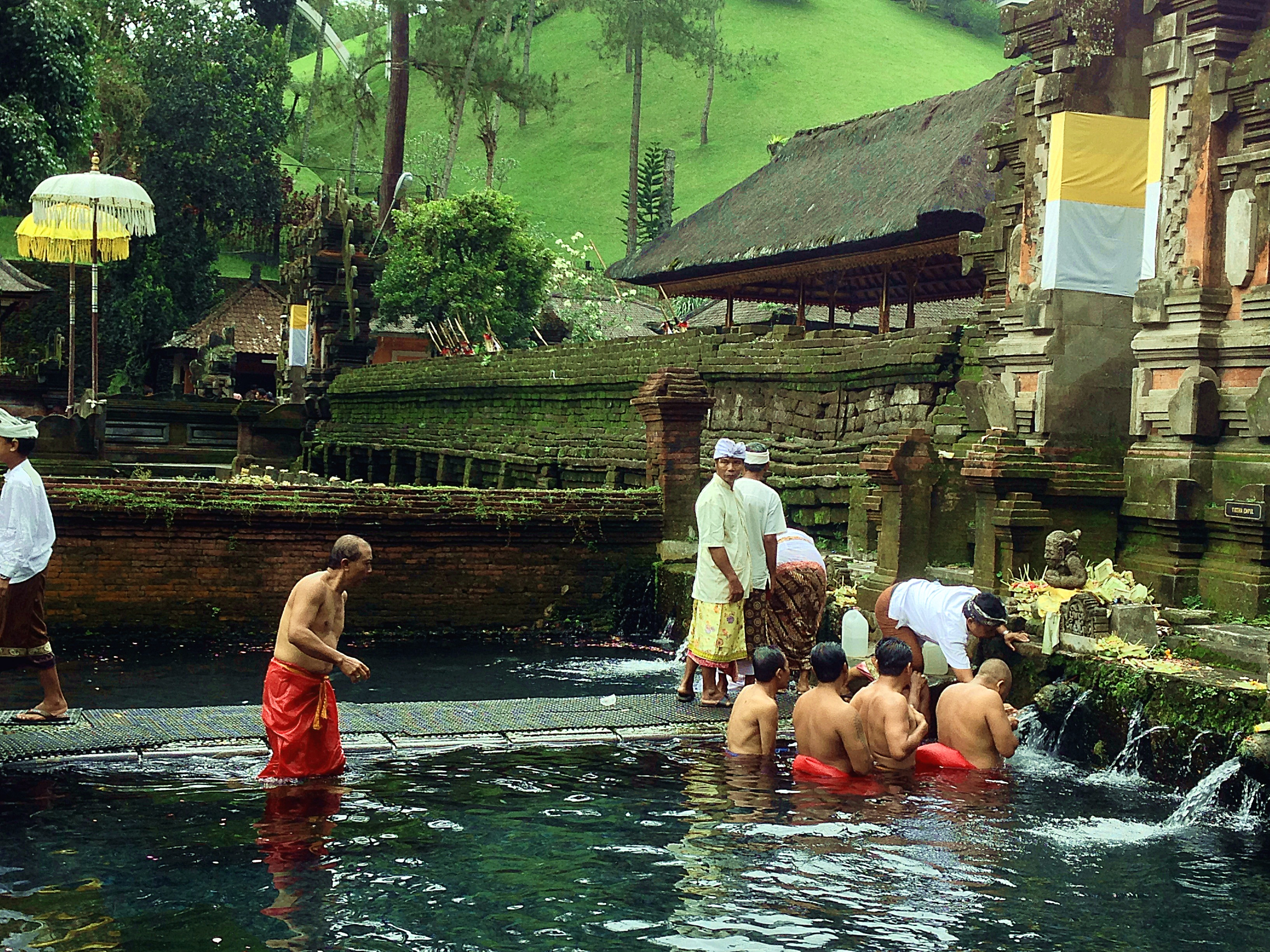
Tirta Empul Temple

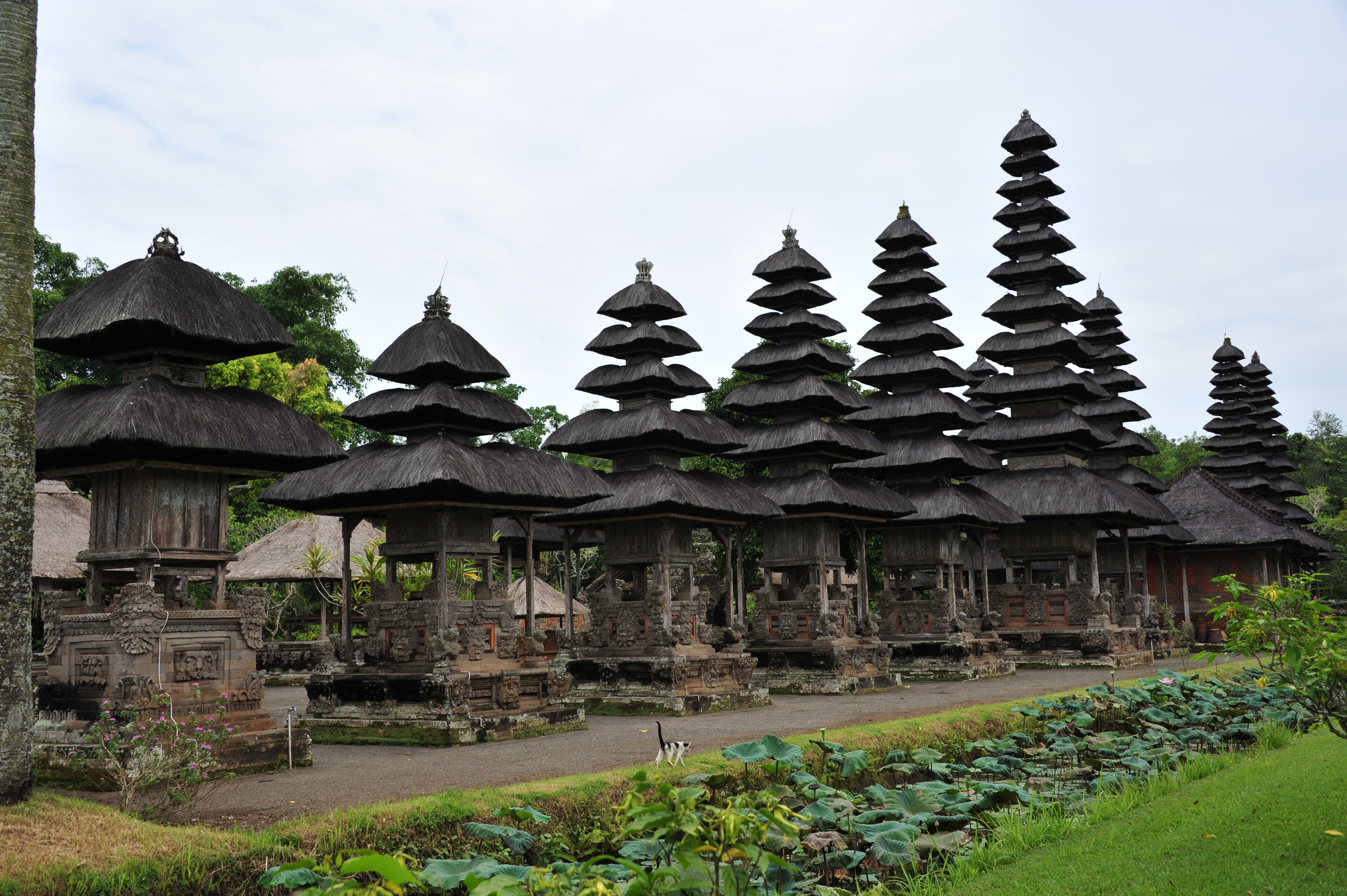
Royal temple of Taman Ayun

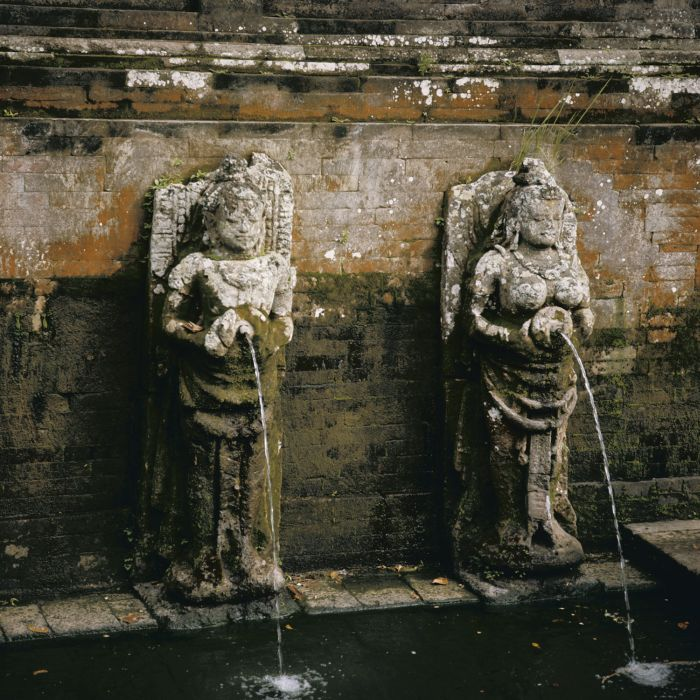
Balinese water-spout statue in Goa Gajah petirtaan (sacred bathing pool)

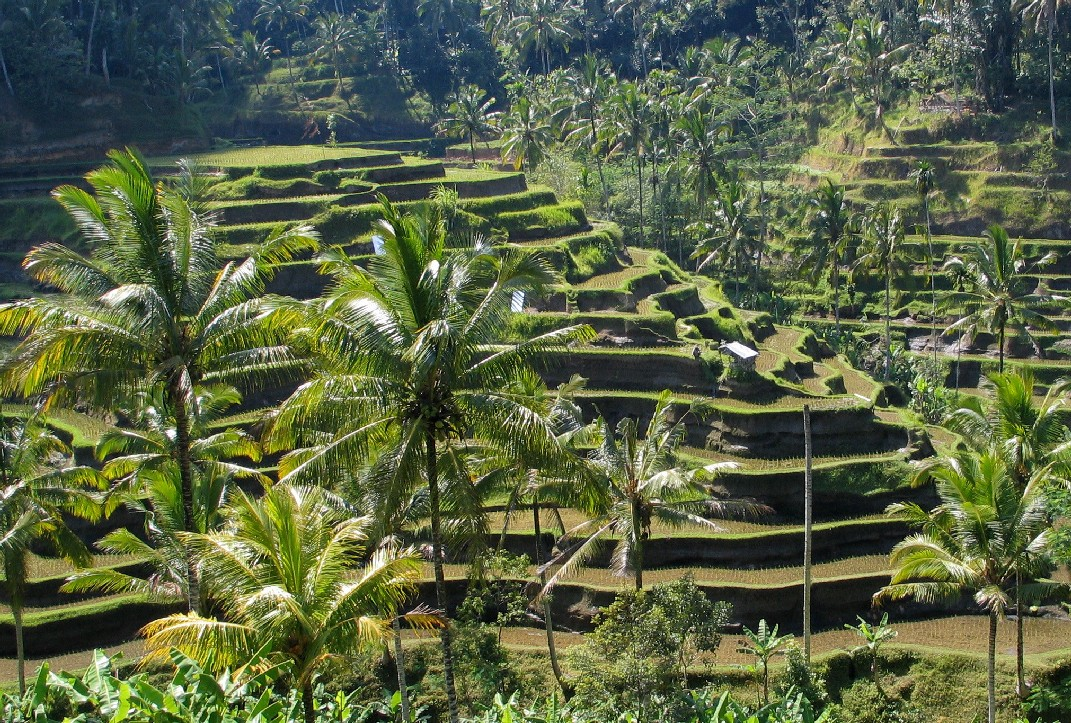
Rice terraces at Tegalalang, Gianyar

== See also ==
- List of Indonesian inventions and discoveries
- Anggabaya
- Bawdi
- Check dam
- Johad
- Stepwell
- Taanka
- Tabanan
- Rani ki vav
- History of stepwells in Gujarat
