= Chen Fu Zhen Ren =

Ancestral deity of Indonesian Chinese people

The effigy of Chen Fu Zhen Ren at Tik Liong Tian Temple, Rogojampi, Banyuwangi, East Java, Indonesia

Chen Fu Zhen Ren (Chinese: 陈府真人; Hokkien: Tan Hu Cin Jin) is an ancestral deity of the Indonesian Chinese people living throughout Banyuwangi Regency, Java, Bali, and Lombok. He is also worshipped by the indigenous population of Bali and Java (Kejawen).

The temples that worship Chen Fu Zhen Ren as their main deity are spread over East Java, Bali, and Lombok; but he is also known by the people of the West Java and other countries (i.e. Singapore, China, and Netherlands) because of trade and academic research.

== Name ==
Chen Fu Zhen Ren is a title which means Chen the Truly Man. The title Zhen Ren (or Cin Jin in Hokkien dialect) is translated as Truly Man, while Chen (Hokkien: Tan) is his family name.

== Written history ==
There are only two old scriptures which record the life of Chen Fu Zhen Ren, while the other sources have been handed down orally. The first source is a short biography written on a stele of Liong Coan Bio Temple in Probolinggo, East Java. The second is from the Malayan document that is kept at Royal Netherlands Institute of Southeast Asian and Caribbean Studies (KITLV), Leiden, Netherlands. The document had been copied by the grandson of the keeper of Ho Tong Bio Temple in Banyuwangi on June 2, 1880, at Buleleng, Bali. The name of the author cannot be identified.

The stele inscription of Liong Coan Bio Temple, Probolinggo, reads:

The family of Tan Hu Cinjin had come from Chaozhou, Guangdong Province. When he was still a child, he was diligent, had filial piety to his mother and his two brothers; he was obedient to the rules, polite, and was a gifted craftsman. He built a palace at Bali and lives for eternity in the port of Blambangan.

The Malayan script tells the life story of Chen Fu Zhen Ren when he was still a human and the legend after he left the world. A summary of the story follows.

=== Life as a human ===
The script mentions Chen Fu Zhen Ren as Tan Tjien Djien (the Hokkien dialect for his name) the eldest of three brothers. Tan Cin Jin became a captain of a single-poled ship. One day the three of them traveled from Batavia to Bali, but their ship was wrecked at Bali Strait. He was cast ashore at Blambangan’s beach, his second brother was lost in the ocean, the third cast upon the shore of Bali. His worshipers believe that the second brother become a deity at Watu Dodol Beach as Ji Kongtjo (Second Great Grand Father) while the third become a tiger and is called Sa Kongtjo (Third Great Grand Father). That is why the local population, especially those of Fujian origin, believe that no tiger will devour them as the tigers consider them to be their grandchildren. After that, Tan Tjien Djien went to Kingdom of Blambangan. The script states that at the moment, the Chinese just came at Blambangan State. Salmon and Sidharta interpreted the words as at that time, Chinese people just started to live at the Kingdom of Blambangan; while The Chronicle of Blambangan which was written by Raden Haryo Notodiningrat and Ottolander (1915) states that the Chinese people lived at Blambangan in 1631 CE. The script does not mention when this happened but it states that the Kingdom of Blambangan became a vassal of the Kingdom of Mengwi, Bali. That fact was used by Salmon and Sidharta to conclude that he had come into Blambangan after 1729 CE, the year when the Kingdom of Buleleng was defeated by the Kingdom of Mengwi and Blambangan became Mengwi's vassal.

He was accepted by the king of Blambangan and then was asked to build a palace at Macanputih, Banyuwangi (which is now a Probolinggo Sub-district). The palace was so beautiful that the king of Mengwi heard of Tan Cin Jin. At that time, the king of Mengwi had a plan to build a new palace; the king of Blambangan asked Tan Cin Jin to go to Mengwi for that reason. Tan Cin Jin had a precognition that he would be betrayed, so he tried to refuse, but the king insisted that he should go and assured him by swearing a vow: if any misfortune should befall him at Bali, the Kingdom of Blambangan would be far from blessed for many generations. So, reassured, Tan Cin Jin went to Bali and started to build the new palace.

After the palace was half finished, the ministries of Mengwi came to the king and said that actually the local craftsmen could build such a palace, thus the king could save his money as Tan's price was so high. The king felt confused because he had promised to pay, and Tan had come a great distance. The ministries concocted a plan to kill Tan because he had no relatives left to protect or avenge him. The king then sent two men from the Brahmin caste to do the job.

The two officers invited Tan Cin Jin to have a good time at the shore. He came although he knew their true objective. But the officers felt guilty and pitied him. After watching them silently for some time, Tan Cin Jin began the conversation and told them to carry out the king's command though, because he was innocent, his murder would be a sign of the fall of Blambangan and Mengwi. The two officers grew scared and asked for forgiveness. They asked to be allowed to follow him, because they were also afraid to return to their king. Tan Cin Jin took them along to Blambangan. It is said that Tan Cin Jin walked over the water across Bali Strait, while the two officers used his sandals as a boat. After that, they climbed Sembulungan Mountain at Blambangan and attained immortality.

=== Life as a god ===
Forty or fifty years later, when "a lot of Chinese already lived at Blambangan" and '"four Chinatowns were already built at Banyualit (now Blimbingsari), Kedaleman, Lateng and Kesatrian", the story continued. Salmon and Sidharta believed that this story had happened less than fifty years after the former, by the fact that the year of the coming of Tan Cin Jin at Blambangan was after 1729 and the fall of the Kingdom of Blambangan (by this script) was in 1765. During the seventeenth century CE, there was an important slave trade route between Bali and Batavia, one of the most important slave trade routes in Asia.

One day, a large slaving vessel sailed from Badung to Batavia, carrying about 60–70 slaves "males and females, old and young, simple and lowly". When the sailboat came near the Sembulungan Mountain, "it seemed the sailboat had left the area for one day and one night, and had a favorable wind and strength, but suddenly in the morning the sailboat returned in the same place". That recurred for almost a month, exhausting their provisions and making the passengers fear imminent death. Some of the slaves were Kshatriyas "who had been sold, and their hands and feet and their neck had been chained with iron". Suddenly one of them was free "although the chain was still locked". He fell into a trace, danced and spoke to the captain in Chinese:

Hey Captain, you should know that I am a Kongco (ancestor grandfather) with the name of Tan Cin Jin. I live in the Peak of Sembulungan Mountain. Take me to Blambangan, so I can live there forever.

The man jumped into the ocean and walked carefully over the waves, while the captain followed him by boat. After the Kshatriyan came to the peak of Sembulungan, he regained his senses and found three statues: one big and two small. Both of them took the statues into Banyualit Port.

At Banyualit, the captain gathered the Chinese citizens, and the Kshatriya fell into a trance once again. He spoke in Chinese about his life on Macanputih and Mengwi, and how his two former murderers now became his two bodyguards forever:

You the Chinese of Blambangan, let it be known ... [the word cannot be identified] ... there was three brothers, the middle lives at Batudodol, the youngest has become a tiger and lives in the jungle of Blambangan and Bali. I never mean to leave this place, so I will know what will happen on Blambangan and Mengwi; I will satisfy myself and enjoy the result from Blambangan and Bali.

The Chinese people embraced him with joy and built a Chinese temple at Lateng, Banyuwangi Regency. But after Blambangan was attacked by the Dutch in 1765, the center of Blambangan had been removed to Banyuwangi City. The Chinese people also migrated and they moved the old temple to what now is Hu Tang Miao Temple.

The anonymous manuscript author also added that in 1880 only three temples of Chen Fu Zhen Ren had been built on Java, i.e. at Banyuwangi City, Besuki, and Probolinggo; while Bali had two temples, i.e. at Buleleng and Badung. And the Chinese at Tabanan, Mengwi, Bangli, Gianyar, Klungkung, Karangasem, and Sasak set home altars for Chen Fu Zhen Ren. Every year, the keepers of Banyuwangi temple would travel Bali to arranged Zhong Yuan Festival. The writer stated:

I got this explanation from my parent ... wangi, from my grandfather and ... [the name cannot be identified] ... were the keepers of Kongco’s temple.

The unidentified word before wangi is generally considered to mean "at Banyuwangi".

== Oral sources and legends ==
These stories below are the histories and legends of Chen Fu Zhen Ren that spread amongst the Chinese, Javanese, and Balinese.

=== The story from Mengwi ===
The Java village ("Banjar Jawa") on the northern Mengwi states that their ancestors came from Java and had taken to Bali to build a palace under the command of a Chinese architect. In the early 1980s, a Dutchman named Henk Schulte Nordholt heard stories from one Gusti Agung Gede Rai (from Kleran Palace) and Ida Bagus Ketut Sindu (from Mengwi), that the king of Mengwi had set a contest to make the best blueprint for his new palace.

A priest from Sibang and the Chinese architect from Blambangan entered. That architect brought the Javanese peoples to help him, but until the third day before the deadline, they had only built the outer wall of the palace. Magically, the palace was finished on time. Mengwi's citizens were afraid of the wonder and asked the king to kill him. The architect ran to Java and disappear at Watu Dodol along with his two followers, reputedly named I Gusti Ngurah Subuh dan Ida Bagus Den Kayu.

Salmon and Sidharta, in 1999, also got information from Anak Agung Gede Ajeng Tisna Mangun (from Gede Mengwi Palace) that the king of Mengwi was not asking the architect to make the blueprint of a palace, but for Pura Taman Ayun garden. The architect made the framework by digging the ditches surrounding it and then gave instruction about which plants and trees should be planted. He went to the shore with two guards that were assigned to accompanied him and never came back. This story is illustrated on the front wall of Gong Zu Miao Temple at Tabanan, Bali. Problematically, Pura Taman Ayun Garden was finished in 1634, while the Malayan script records that Chen Fu Zhen Ren lived much later.

Henk Schulte Nordholt noted in his book Negara Mengwi that Taman Ayun was renovated in 1750. The architect's name is given as Hobin Ho.

=== The stories from the temples of Banyuwangi and Tabanan ===
The worshippers of Chen Fu Zhen Ren at Banyuwangi and Tabanan, both Chinese and Balinese, know well the story of their patron. He is called Kongco (Hokkien dialect for gongzu; lit. grand ancestor), although this title is also used by other temples for their own patrons. The people of Hu Tang Miao Temple, Banyuwangi, also call him Wainanmeng Gongzu (lit. ancestor of Blambangan); Blambangan was the ancient name for Banyuwangi.

Hu Tang Miao Temple is the oldest Taoist temple in East Java, Bali, and Lombok. Franz Epp, the German doctor, said that:

Their pagoda and deity is the oldest in Java, even before the coming of Europeans. Just like Lateran in Rome, this temple can be called "the mother or head of all cities and whole world" related to the other temples in Java, because the later consider themselves as its offspring or branches. The Chinese have great respect for this main temple.

Actually the oldest Taoist temple in Java is at Jakarta, West Java. Doctor Epp was clearly amazed by Hu Tang Miao Temple.

The keepers of Hu Tang Miao Temple said that Chen Fu Zhen Ren was a craftsman from Canton (now Guangzhou). He was asked to build a palace for the king, but many people became jealous of him. That was why he ran away across Bali Strait. The temple of Tabanan adds the story: he created a tiger from his right back and a crocodile from his left. And then he crossed the Bali Strait on the back of a giant crab. Another version states that he came back to Blambangan magically, while his two attendants rode the giant crab. They lived at Banyuwangi and the Chinese called him "the true man" or "Zhen Ren".

=== The legend of Watu Dodol ===
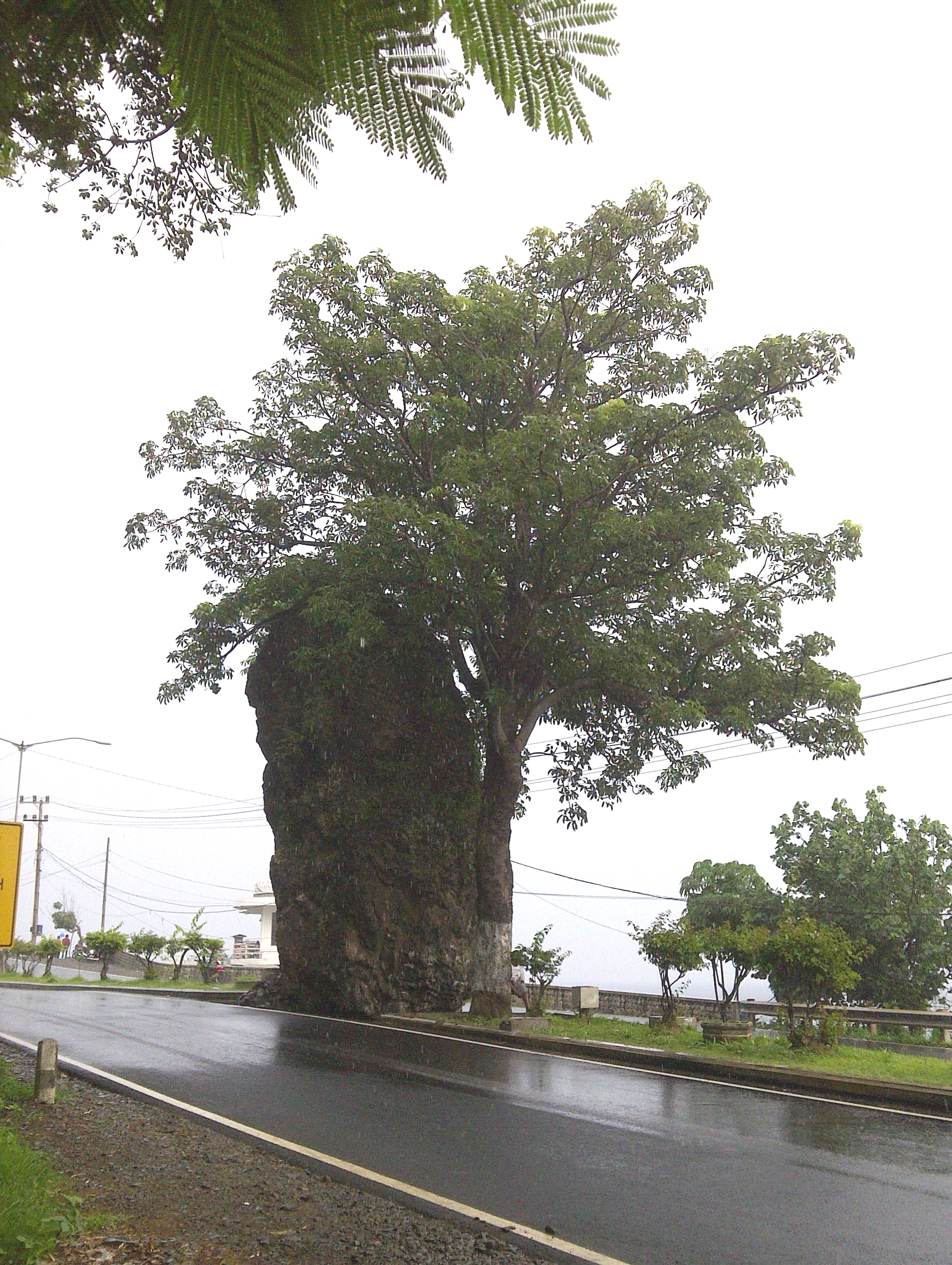
Watu Dodol in Banyuwangi Regency, Indonesia

Chen Fu Zhen Ren was an architect that fulfilled the contest made by the king of Mengwi. He had to build a palatial garden under certain amount of time. But with three days to go before the deadline, the architect had not built anything yet. The next morning, a beautiful garden magically appeared.

The king of Mengwi, afraid of his power, imprisoned him. But that very night, the two soldiers guarding him took him off to Blambangan, because they believed that the architect was an innocent man. But their flight was known and they were chased down by Mengwi's soldiers. The battle took place on the shore of Blambangan, and the two guards were killed. The architect turned himself into Watu Dodol, a black and large volcanic stone with a base smaller than its top. The locals buried the two guards and their tombs are still visited until this day by the Chinese, Balinese, and Javanese; while the Watu Dodol itself is considered sacred.

The local legend said that, in the modern time, when the local government planned to widen the provincial road, they tried to remove Watu Dodol and plant it somewhere else. After much hard work, they succeeding in plucking it out and moving it, but by the following day, the stone had returned to its former position. They never tried to remove Watu Dodol again; that is why it is now placed between two lanes of the provincial road.

=== The story of the Hainanese merchant ===
Once, the ship of a Hainanese merchant had been stopped by a supernatural power near the shore of Muncar fishing village. The merchant went ashore and became a hermit. One day he saw a very bright light coming from inside of a jungle. He found a plank of wood that had been broke into three pieces. He took the pieces home at Hainan and crafted them. But the wooden pieces did not want to stay at Hainan, and asked the merchant to take them back to Blambangan, and to place them at the temple of Banyuwangi (i.e. Hu Tang Miao Temple).

=== The effigy of Rogojampi temple ===
The oral tradition from De Long Dian Temple of Rogojampi, East Java, states that a merchant named Lin Jing Feng (1915) had a dream that Chen Fu Zhen Ren was at Watu Dodol. The locals occasionally pray at two muslim tombs there. At Watu Dodol, Lin Jing Feng found a stone effigy which is believed to be an image of Chen Fu Zhen Ren. The stone effigy was placed at his home until he had enough money to build a temple at the De Long Dian Temple at Rogojampi.

=== The experience of the spiritualists ===
- In May 2010, the wife of a Balinese paranormal was possessed by a holy spirit. That holy spirit had a gentle voice and used Chinese language; he said that he was the owner of that area. After that, the spirit entered the altar of Chen Fu Zhen Ren.
- One time, a Balinese woman had a dream that she was the offspring of one of the Brahmin that followed Chen Fu Zhen Ren. After the dream, she always came to Banyuwangi to pray at the temple, although she was not a Taoist.

=== The controversial hypothesis of Chen Fu Zhen Ren’s origin ===
Two researchers and spiritualists, Indrana Tjahjono and Mas Soepranoto, made a hypothesis that Chen Fu Zhen Ren was the second emperor of the Ming dynasty (i.e. Jianwen Emperor), that had been overthrown by his own uncle and fled (another version stated that he died). Their assumption came from an accessory of the Chinese emperor's crown that is kept at Hu Tang Miao Temple, Banyuwangi. This crown accessory was used on Chen Fu Zhen Ren's effigy from the 1950s to the 1960s. The other evidence is an engraving on the oldest effigy of Chen Fu Zhen Ren, which represents a dragon. For Chinese, the dragon image cannot be used by commoners, under penalty of death. Only the emperors or great commanders may use it. As a Zhen Ren (True Man), it is believed that Chen Fu Zhen Ren would not have used an image that he had no right to.

Zhu Yunwen (or the Jianwen Emperor) only reigned for three years before he was overthrown in 1403. The legitimate version states that he was burned himself along with his palace, but his remains have never been found. Another version says that he fled to the southern sea. Yongle Emperor was afraid that Zhu Yunwen would be back to claim his right, so he sent three commanders to find him: the first was Wan Lian Fu who went to Champa, the second Yan Qin went to Java, while Zheng He made his famous seven journeys.

On his seventh journey in 1433, Zheng He came to Blambangan and it is believed that he met the Jianwen Emperor, but the Yongle Emperor was dead at that time. Tjahjono and Soepranoto raise a possibility that this meeting was the creation of the name of "Blambangan". The Chinese name for Blambangan is Wai Nan Meng (Hokkien: Hway Lam Bang) which means the dream over south boundary, referring to the hope of Zheng He to meet the emperor being fulfilled at that place.

The coup d’etat of Jianwen Emperor happened in 1403, while the building of Pura Taman Ayu garden was accomplished c. 1627, and the building of Blambangan palace in 1700. This range of times is the main problem for these hypotheses. The spiritualists countered this argument by stating that the wide range of the times just shows the greatness of Chen Fu Zhen Ren.

== List of nine main temples of Chen Fu Zhen Ren ==
- Hu Tang Miao Temple (Ho Tong Bio)(護唐廟), Ikan Gurami Street No. 54, Banyuwangi (city), East Java
- Bao Tang Miao Temple (Poo Tong Bio), Teratai Street No. 1, Besuki, East Java
- Long Quan Miao Temple (Liong Coan Bio), WR Supratman Street No. 51, Probolinggo, East Java
- De Long Dian Temple (Tik Liong Tian), Highway Street No. 69, Rogojampi, East Java
- Vihara Dharma Cattra (Kong Co Bio), Melati Street No. 18, Tabanan Regency, Bali
- Vihara Dharmayana (Leeng Gwan Bio), Blambangan Street, Kuta, Bali
- Ling Yen Gong Temple (Ling Gwan Kiong), Erlangga Street No. 65, Singaraja, Bali
- Cung Ling Bio Temple, Udayana Street, Negara, Bali
- Vihara Bodhi Dharma (Pao Hwa Kong), Yos Sudarso Street No. 180, Ampenan, Mataram (city), Lombok

== Religion sects ==
Chen Fu Zhen Ren is known as a gentle and kind grand ancestor, honest in speech and well mannered. Some spiritualists describe him as an old man with a healthy body, white dressed, white haired, and white bearded. People usually ask him about medication and other problems of life; and his answers are believed very accurate. The worshipers from Indonesia and other countries leave many mementos on his temples.

=== The mementos on Hu Tang Miao Temple, Banyuwangi ===
Some of the wooden poetry planks on Hu Tang Miao Temple are:

- The planks from winter of 1911–1912.
  Tan by his virtuousness had raised into Heaven; Cin by his great deeds protects humanity.
- The planks from Chen Guanjie and Chen Ciutong from Guangzhou, winter of 1898-1899.
  Kong’s virtue is perfect, his kindness is amazing, he supports thousand of households; Co’s heart is honest, his laws are perfect, he protects ten thousand families.
- The planks from Xu Tianfu.
  His kindness shines over all things.
- The plank that is dated in winter 1903–1904.
  He gives good health to the citizens.
- The plank from 1924.
  If there is a prayer there must be an answer.

=== The mementos from Bao Tang Miao Temple, Besuki ===
Some of the wooden poetry planks are:

- Shen Ling Hai Guo plank.
  The strength of the god protects maritime countries.
- The planks from a business at Surabaya (1903).
  Kong’s virtues drown the Chinese and the indigenous peoples, everyone gets their fortune, peoples pray for him as before; Co’s helps the Fujianese and Cantonese, four peoples had done their job well, the efforts on the winter has recovered.
- The planks from Xinan citizen (1903).
  Kong’s way leads to full happiness, the Easterners realize this and have changed; Co’s help spreads everywhere, Yi the Westerner merchant gets fortune from his virtue.

=== The mementos on Long Quan Miao Temple, Probolinggo ===
Some of the wooden poetry planks are:

- The planks from Chen Zhen Fang.
  Kong is addressed as True Man, the villagers of the southern Probolinggo are covered by his virtue; Co addressed as a wise man, citizens and the civil bureaucrats get his help.

=== The mementos on Ling Yen Gong Temple, Singaraja ===
Some of the wooden poetry planks are:

- Planks from Qiu Wen Sheng (1873).
  Kong’s blessings are like the rain that pours over and over, his help waters every place; Co’s virtues are like the mountain that is covered by clouds, his great blessings bring happiness and peace.
- Plank from Zheng Zhen Xiang for his appointment as a captain in 1884.
  Gong is Famous.
- Plank from Captain Chen Cheng Xuan (1889).
  His medicinal is Holy.
- Planks from Wang Lian Zhou (1905).
  Kong gives his virtues; the Chinese and the indigenous are fortunate because of that. Co prepares medicinal recipes; males and females praise him.
- The plank from Qian Chao Qing (1876), the owner of ships industry Rili Zhuang, Hainan)
  His elegance covers Hainanese.
- The planks from the owner of Jinbaoji Zhuang business (1885), Hainan.
  The virtues that he gives to us are limitless.
- The planks from Wenchang citizens, Hainan (1898).
  His sanctuary brings happiness.
- The planks from the owner of Jiang Fuji business (1879), Singapore.

== See also ==
- Chinese folk religion
- Chinese folk religion & Tridharma in Indonesia
- Chinese gods and immortals
- Shen (Chinese religion)
- Xian (Taoism)
