= Anggabaya =

- Anggabaya on the Island of Bali
- Coordinates: 8°35′54″S 115°14′01″E
- Country: Indonesia
- Province: Bali
- Kota/City: Denpasar
- Kecamatan/: Denpasar Timur
- District: East Denpasar
- Kelurahan/Borough: Penatih
- Banjar/Parish: Anggabaya
- Time zone: Central Indonesia Time - WITA (Waktu Indonesia Tengah) GMT + 8 hours
- Post Code: 80238
- Area Code: 0361

Anggabaya is a small village in Bali, Indonesia.

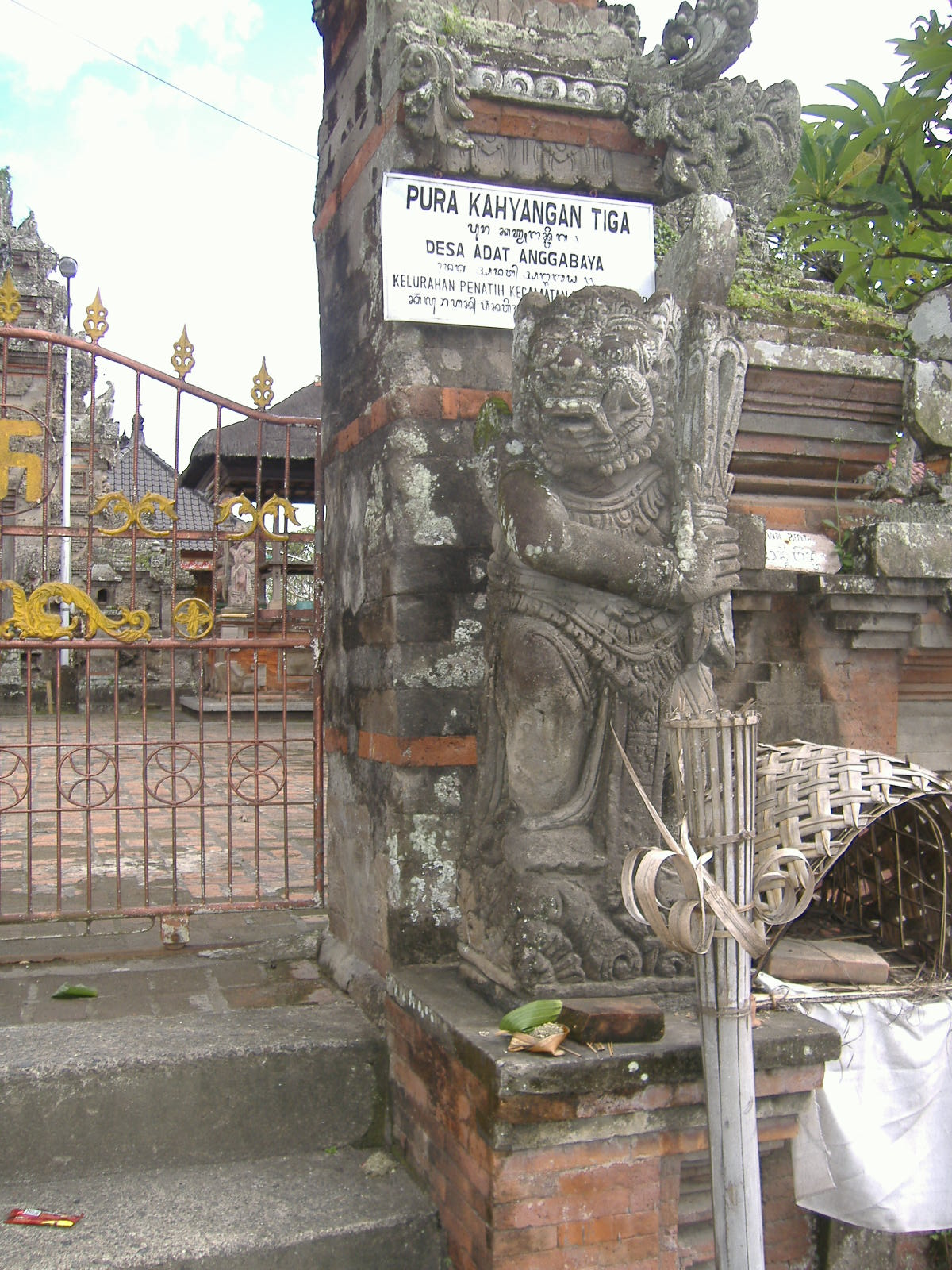
Entrance to the temple at Anggabaya

== Title ==
Its correct formal title is Desa Pekraman Anggabaya (in the Balinese language) or Desa Adat Anggabaya (in the Indonesian language). In English it would be The Traditional (or Customary) Village of Anggabaya. Desa = Village. NB. Pekraman is also spelt Pakraman - both spellings are equally to be found in use.

In common parlance it is usually referred to as Banjar Anggabaya (a Banjar is more or less the same as a Parish), or just simply Anggabaya.

== Location ==
It is located approximately 4½ miles north of the centre of Denpasar, the provincial capital of Bali, and is situated on Jalan Trenggana (Trenggana Road). The nearest villages are Pelagan to the south, Jenah to the south-west, Cengkilung to the north-west and Jabajero to the east. A small river, known locally as Tukad Anggabaya, flows down from the north through the eastern part of the village, separating the hamlet of Jungut from the rest of the village.

== The Village ==
In 2006 there were 157 households in the village with a total of 800 inhabitants. About 75% of the adults were then involved in farming, 20% in the handicraft industry and the remainder worked as civil servants, traders or in other professions.

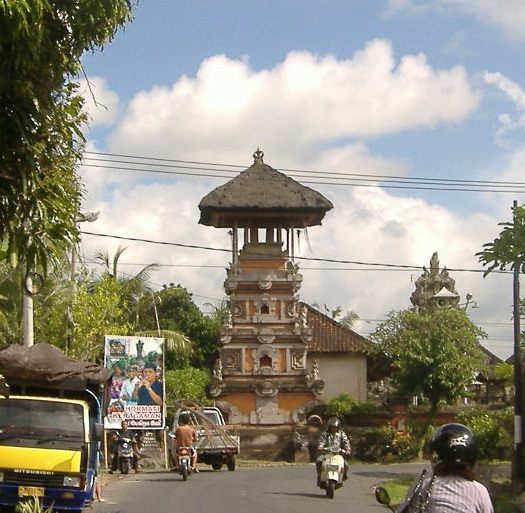
Anggabaya Temple Tower

In the village one finds a traditional market with a large Banyan tree, Pasar Kertha Waringin Sari (pasar = market, waringin = Banyan). This market was one of three Balinese traditional markets used as a subject for a postgraduate research thesis. Next to the market is one of the village's 3 Balinese Hindu temples, and across the road is a large wantilan (open sided village meeting hall). The village primary school is SDN No.3 Penatih - Sekolah Dasar Negeri No.3 Penatih - National Elementary School No.3 Penatih. The school is situated about 250 yds south of the village market.

The village doctor holds a private surgery 6 evenings a week next to the primary school. In addition, medical and dental cover is provided each morning 6 days a week at the local Community Health Centre, Puskesmas II (Pusat Kesehatan Masyarakat = Community Health Centre) which is located 1.3 miles SE of Anggabaya in Jalan Nagasari, Laplap.

== Administration ==
Anggabaya is one of the 10 Banjar that make up Kelurahan Penatih. A Kelurahan is local government division more or less the same as a Borough. In turn, Penatih is one of the 11 Kelurahan and/or Desa that make up the Kecamatan (or District) of Denpasar Timur (East Denpasar). The Post Code for all of Penatih, and therefore for Anggabaya as well, is 80238.

Telephone numbers in North-East Denpasar, which includes all of Penatih and Anggabaya, have 6 digits starting with 46 and use the Denpasar Area Code (0361), like this: (0361) 46xxxx.

== Subak ==
Subak is the traditional Balinese system of irrigation. It is organised amongst (rice) farming communities and controls the distribution of water, especially at rice planting time. In March 2010 Subak Anggabaya had 162 members and covered an area of 39.54 hectares.

In 2009 Subak Anggabaya was chosen as the beneficiary of the Denpasar City Government's Consolidation Farm Programme to assist rural farmers who were experiencing high fertilizer and seed prices coupled with low prices for harvested rice. In 2010 Subak Anggabaya was chosen as the beneficiary of a Denpasar City Government Programme to build a 5 km "Farmers' Trail" or access road in the subak.

Subak Anggabaya is notable in that it has been used a subject for research by various postgraduates for their theses and by other researchers for technical papers.

== Climate ==
Anggabaya has two seasons, rainy and dry. The rainy season runs from about November to April and the dry season from about May to October.

The temperature is around 86°F (30°C) by day and 79°F (26°C) by night. It does not vary much throughout the year, although in the dry season the temperature is one or two degrees cooler than in the rainy season.

The current weather can be found here

== See also ==
- Denpasar
- Puskesmas
- Subak (irrigation)
