= Pura Taman Ayun =

Balinese Hindu temple in Indonesia

- ᬧᬸᬭᬢᬫᬦ᭄ᬅᬬᬸᬦ᭄
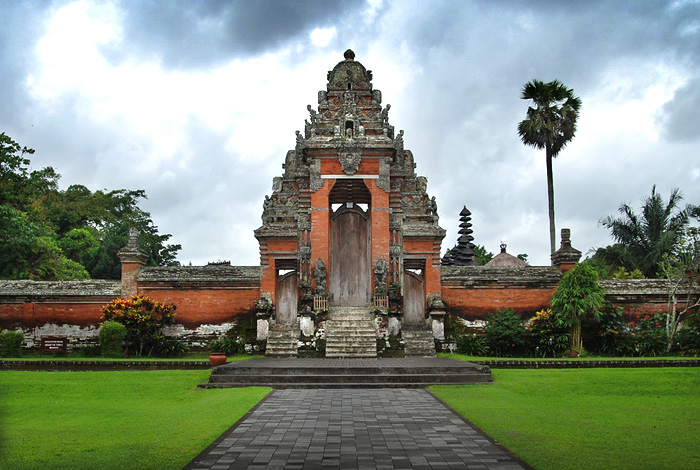
- Entrance to the inner sanctum.

Religion
- Affiliation: Hinduism
- District: Mengwi
- Governing body

Location
- State: Bali
- Country: Indonesia
- Interactive map of Pura Taman Ayun
- Coordinates: 8°32′29.79″S 115°10′21.37″E

Pura Taman Ayun (Balinese script: ᬧᬸᬭᬢᬫᬦ᭄ᬅᬬᬸᬦ᭄) is a compound of Balinese temple and garden located in Mengwi district (kecamatan) in Badung Regency, Bali, Indonesia. Its water features are an integral part of the local subak system.

== Location ==
The temple is in the middle of the town of Mengwi, 19 km north of Denpasar.

== Description ==
Taman Ayung, meaning "beautiful garden", is the second-largest temple in Bali. Its whole compound covers 6.9 hectares (17 acres), a rectangular piece of land oriented north-south and surrounded to the west, south and east by a large body of water. It is accessed by a bridge on the south side.

It has the three sections common to holy temples: outer courtyard (jabaan or Nista Mandala), middle courtyard (jaba tengah or Madia Mandala) and inner sanctuary (jeroan or jaba jero, or Utama Mandala). Each courtyard is separated from the others by a candi bentar or split gate. The inner sanctuary, reserved for worshippers, has the highest constructions; its shrines have different heights, ranging from two tiers all the way up to eleven tiers. Here, Hindu gods are venerated as well as the ancestors of the Mengwi dynasty.

=== Water temple, the subak system and World Heritage ===
Water is a large part of its design and that which makes Taman Ayun Temple unique, both in aesthetics and as an essential part of the local irrigation system or subak. A large body of water surrounds the whole compound, like a huge moat. The inner sanctuary is also surrounded by a smaller moat. There are multiple ponds, basins and fountains.

On 6 July 2012, Pura Taman Ayun became a World Heritage Site as one of the five sites defined by UNESCO in the Subak cultural landscape of Bali. The exact name of that global site is "Cultural Landscape of Bali Province: the Subak System as a Manifestation of the Tri Hita Karana Philosophy". For Taman Ayun, it takes in the 6.9 hectares (17 acres) surface of the compound including the large outer moat; to which it adds a buffer zone of 51.3 hectares (127 acres). The temple's waters are said to feed three subaks in the Badung Regency.

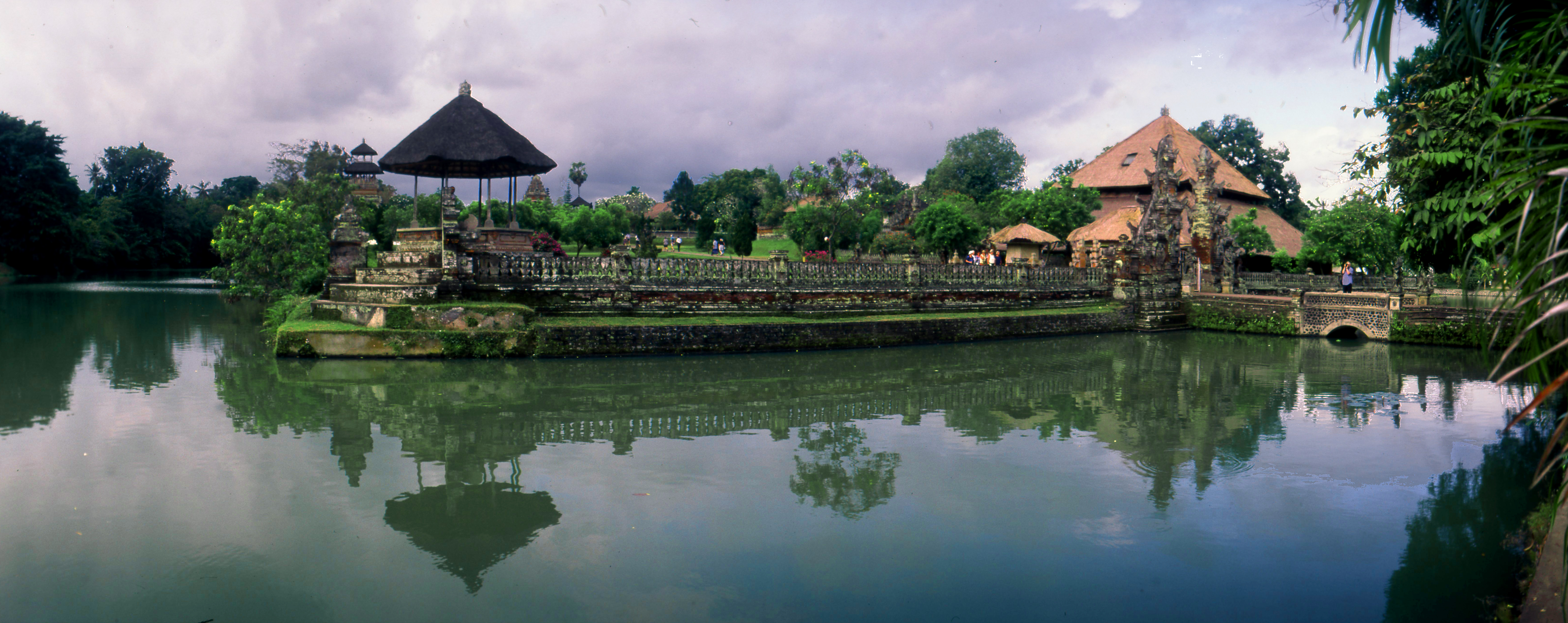
Large water body around the whole compound, part of the subak system. South-west corner, looking north, with the main entrance brige on the right.

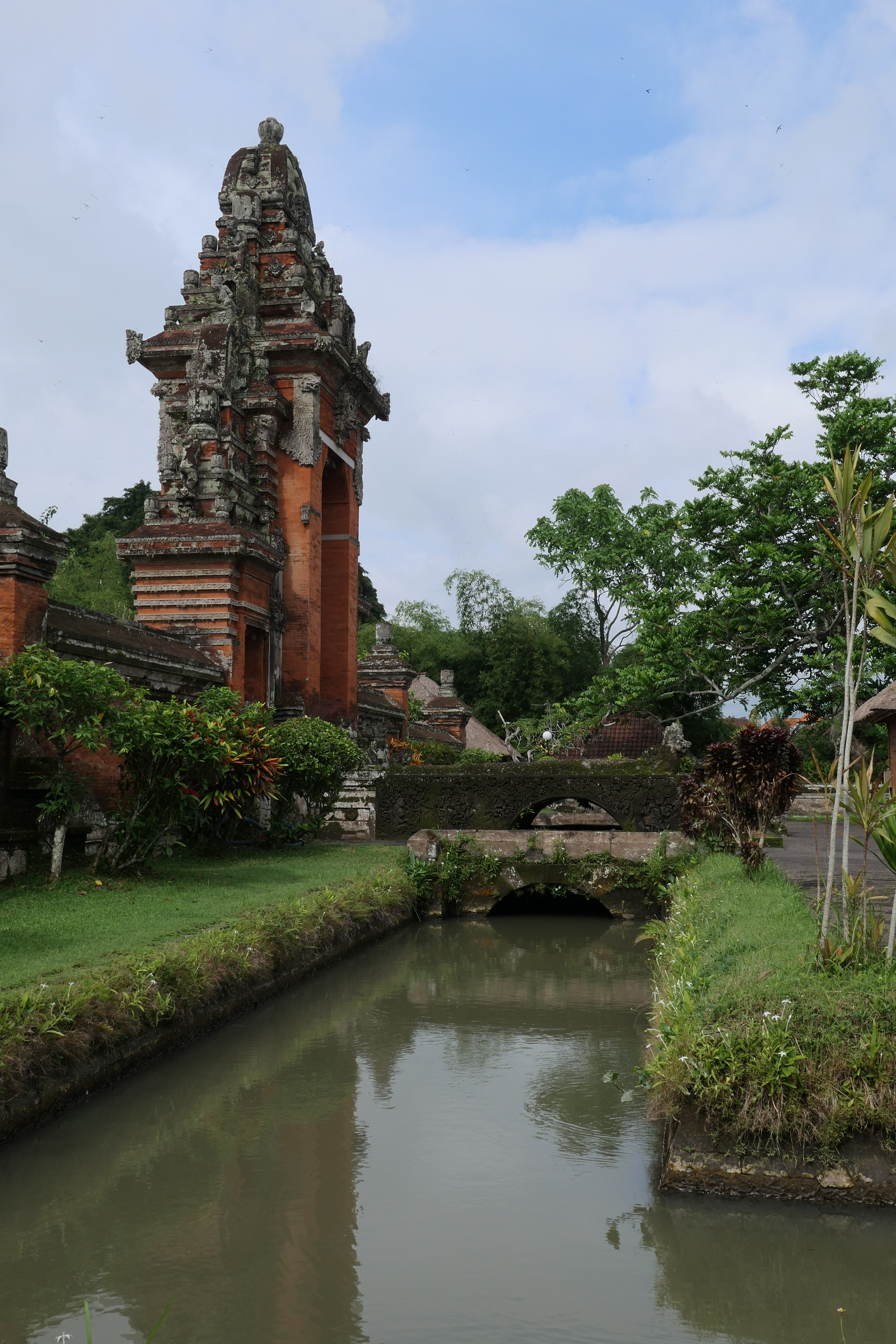
Moat by a gate

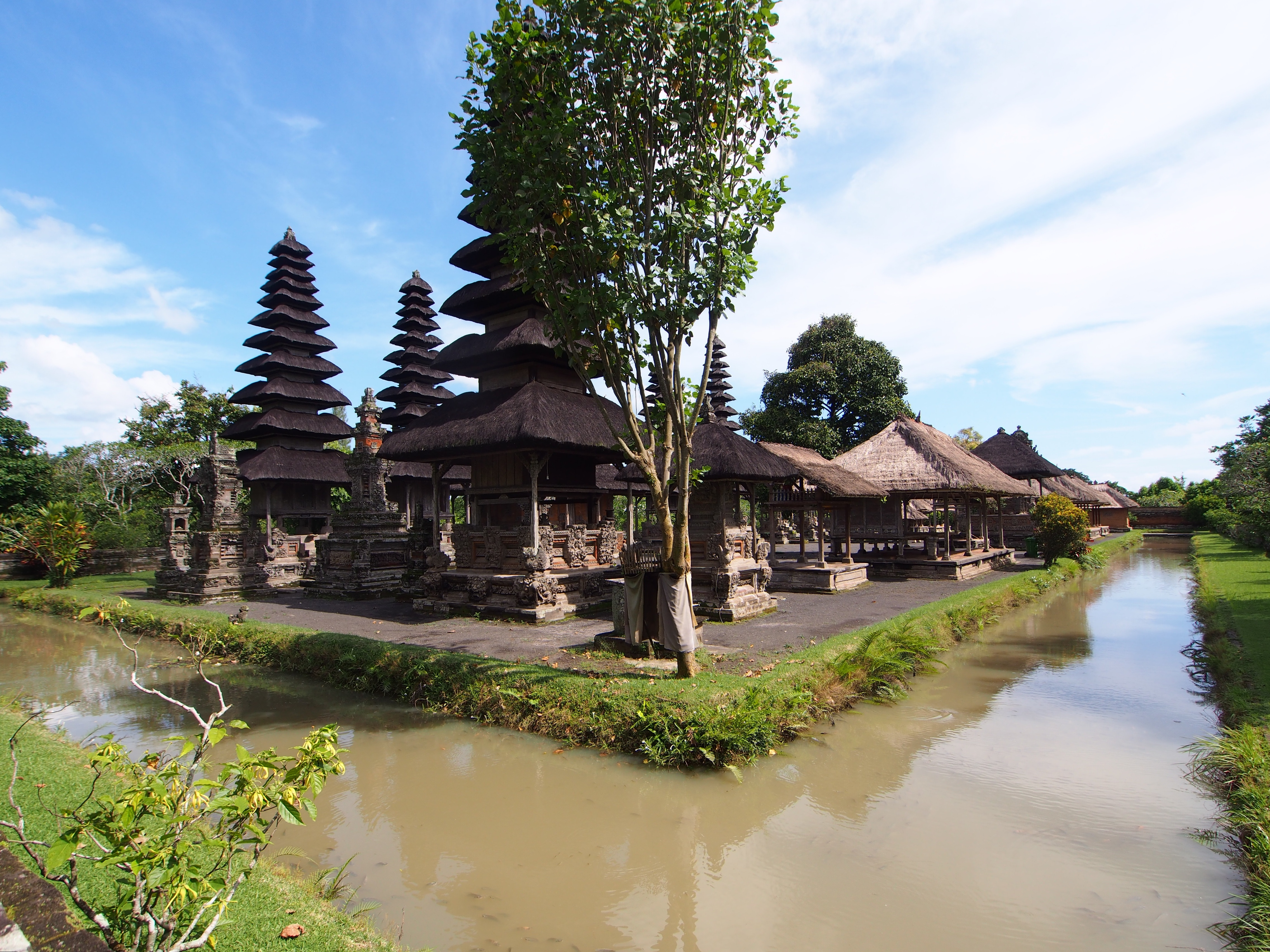
Moat around the inner sanctuary

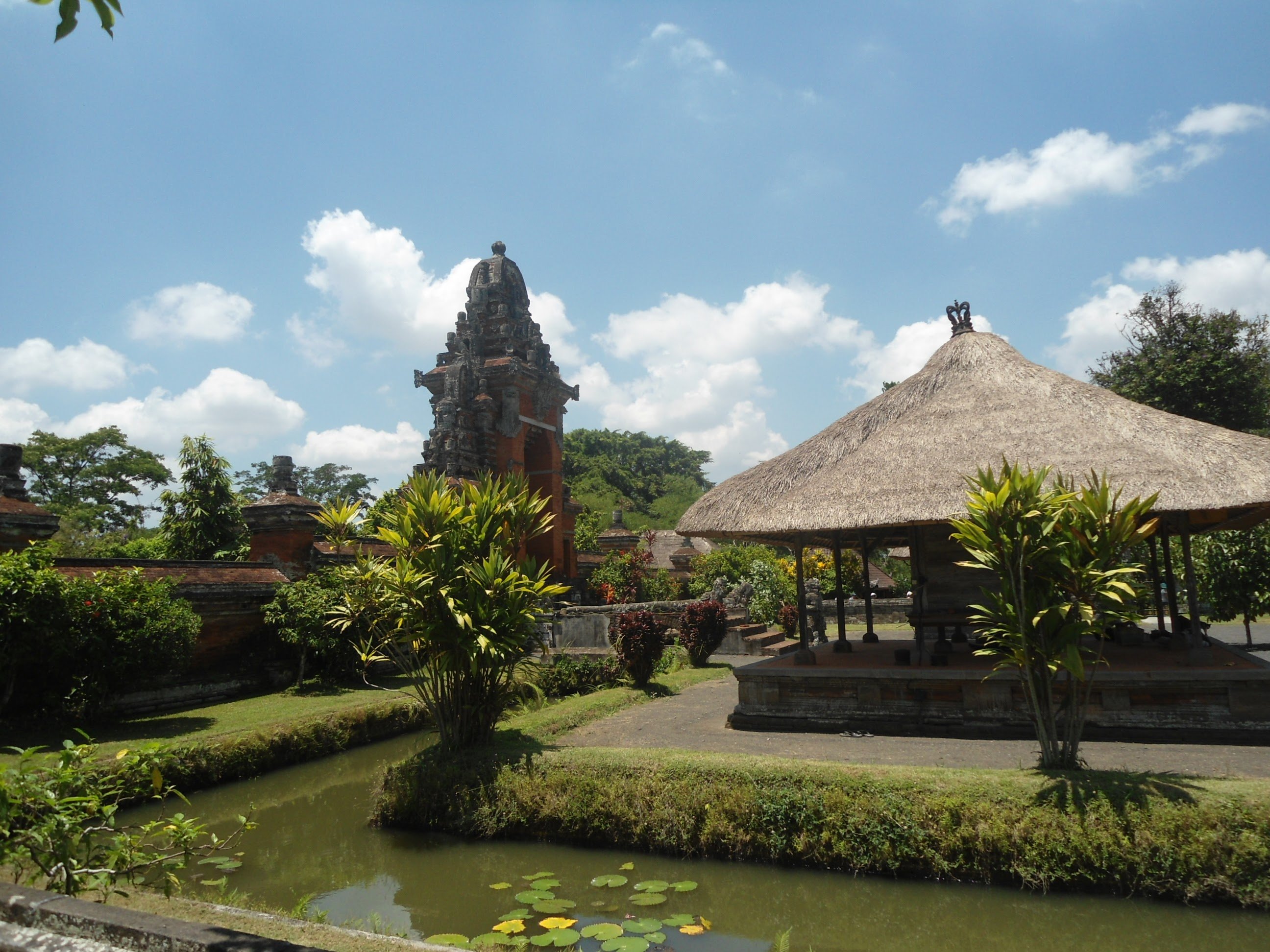
Moat around the inner sanctuary

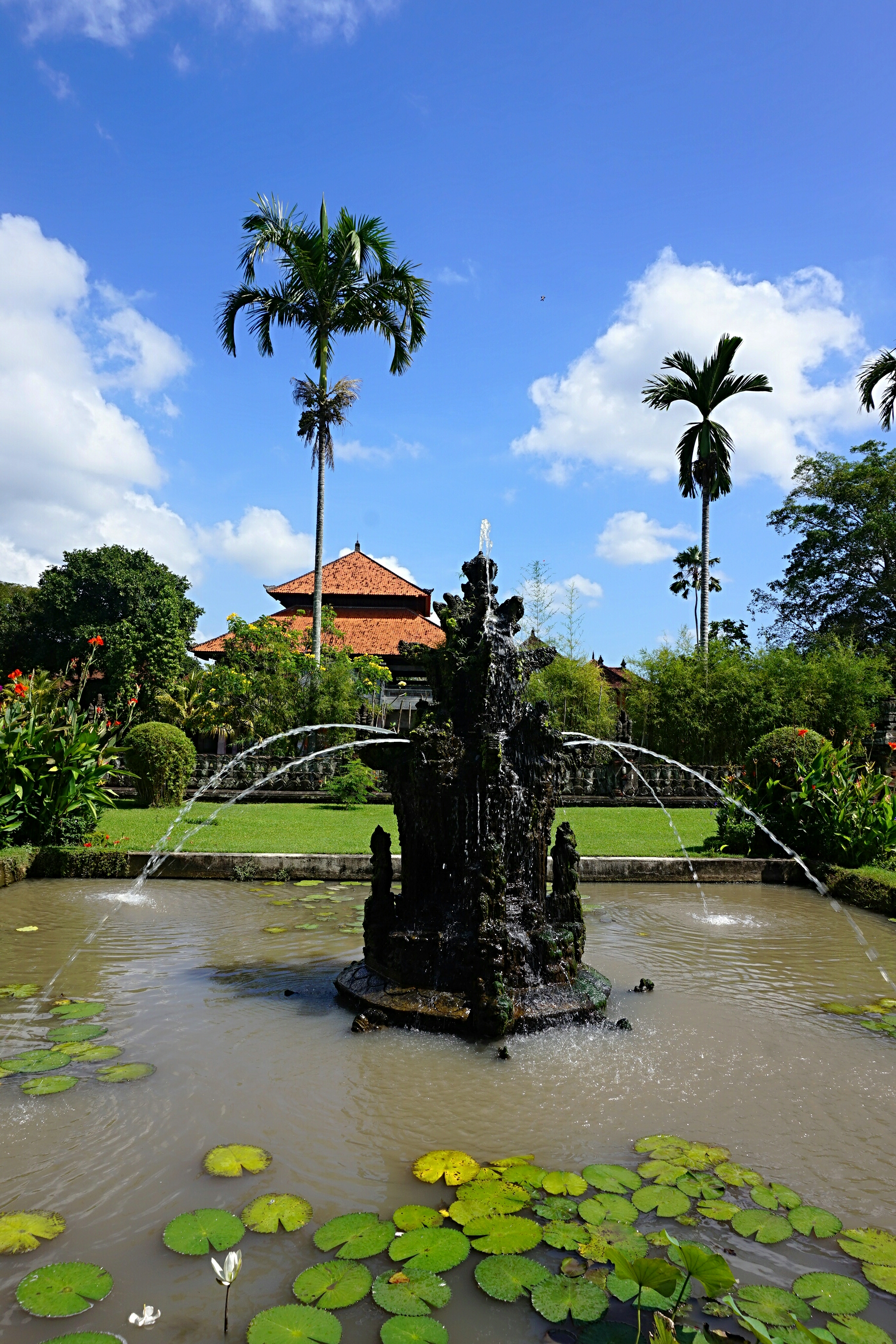
Fountain

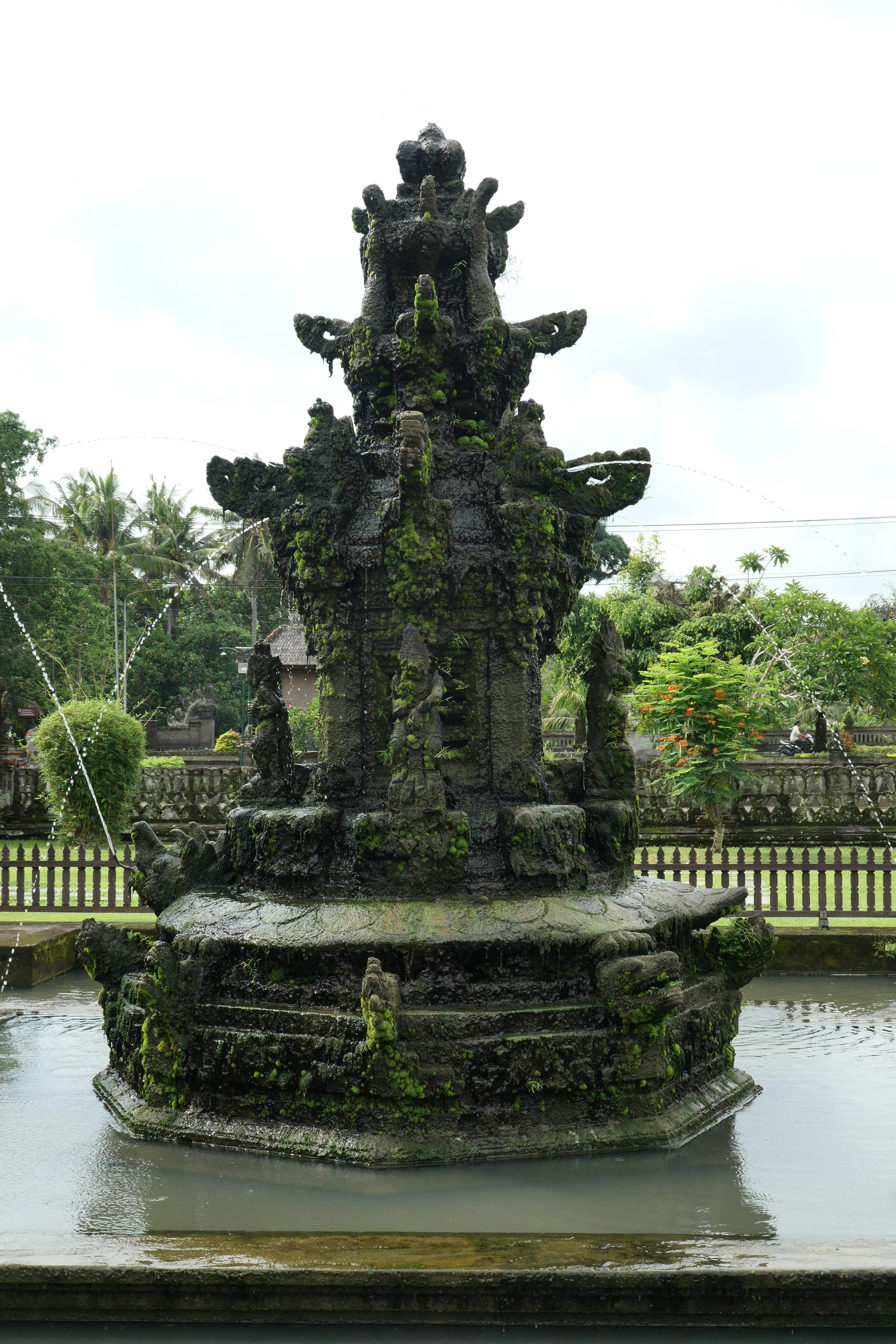
Fountain

== History ==
Taman Ayun was built in 1634 AD (year 1556 on the çaka calendar) by the king of Mengwi Gusti Agung Putu (also known as Cokorda Sakti Blambangan), as a family temple (pura kawiten) to honour the spirits of his ancestors. Throughout the centuries, it enderwent several restorations and renovations. According to Henk Schulte Nordholt, it was renovated in 1750 by an architect named Hobin Ho. The last major renovation was in 1937.

== Media and others ==
The temple garden was featured on the television program Around the World in 80 Gardens.

A wing of the complex includes an art gallery, and a theatre showing the history of the temple as told by the Mengwi royal family. This building is linked to the outer courtyard by a wantilan, an open pavilion originally used for cockfighting which now used caters for gatherings and musical performances.

The small Ogoh Ogoh Museum is in Jl. Ayodya, only metres away from the south-west corner of the temple compound. It gathers some ogoh ogoh figures, representations of demons used in Ngrupuk parade, the day before Nyepi day.
A few steps away from it is the Yadnya Museum, in Jl. Wasista, just outside the temple compound and also near the south-west corner. It displays replicas of Balinese Hindu rituals.

== Gallery ==
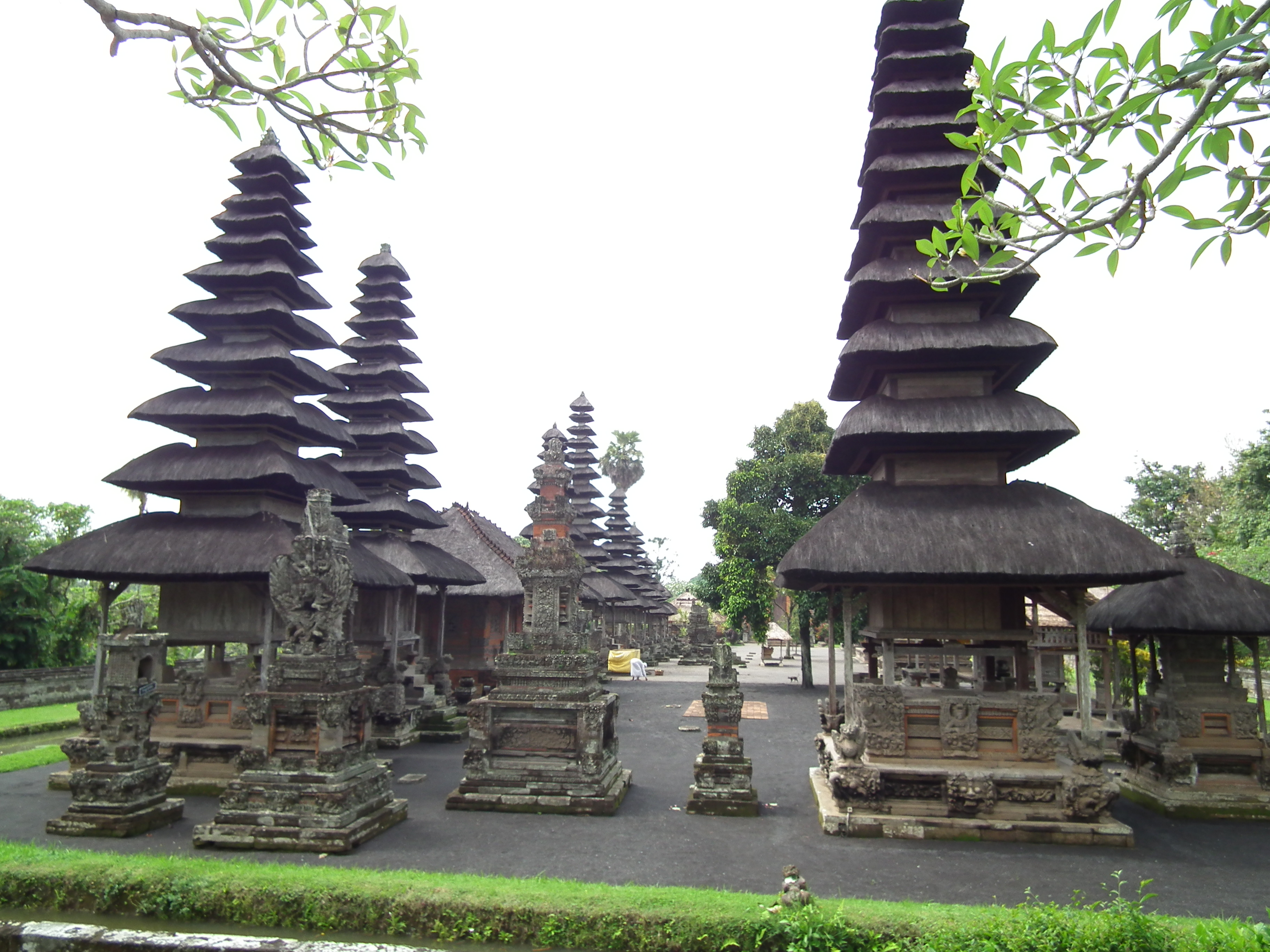
Meru towers, pagoda-like shrines.

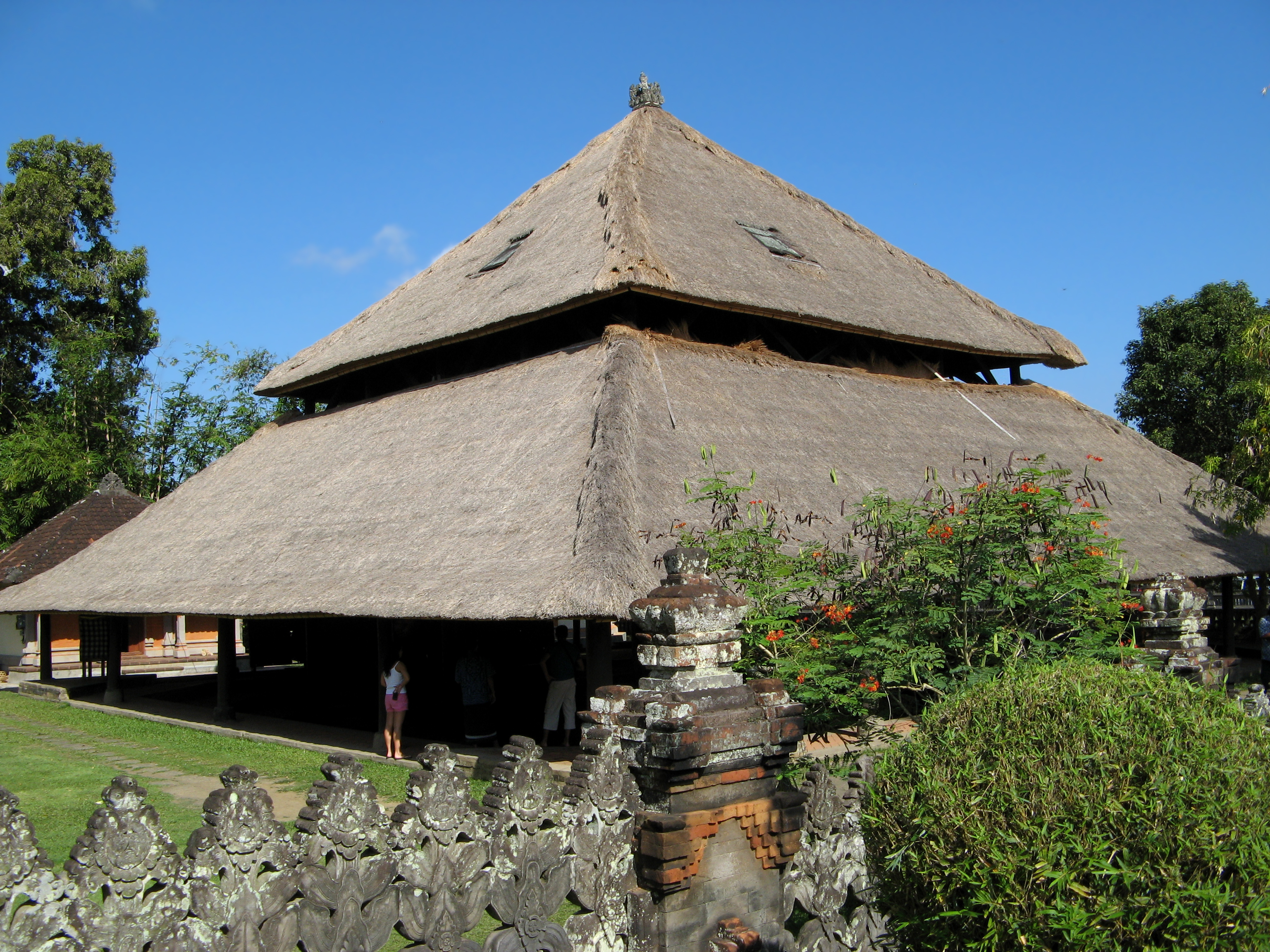
The wantilan or cockfighting pavilion.

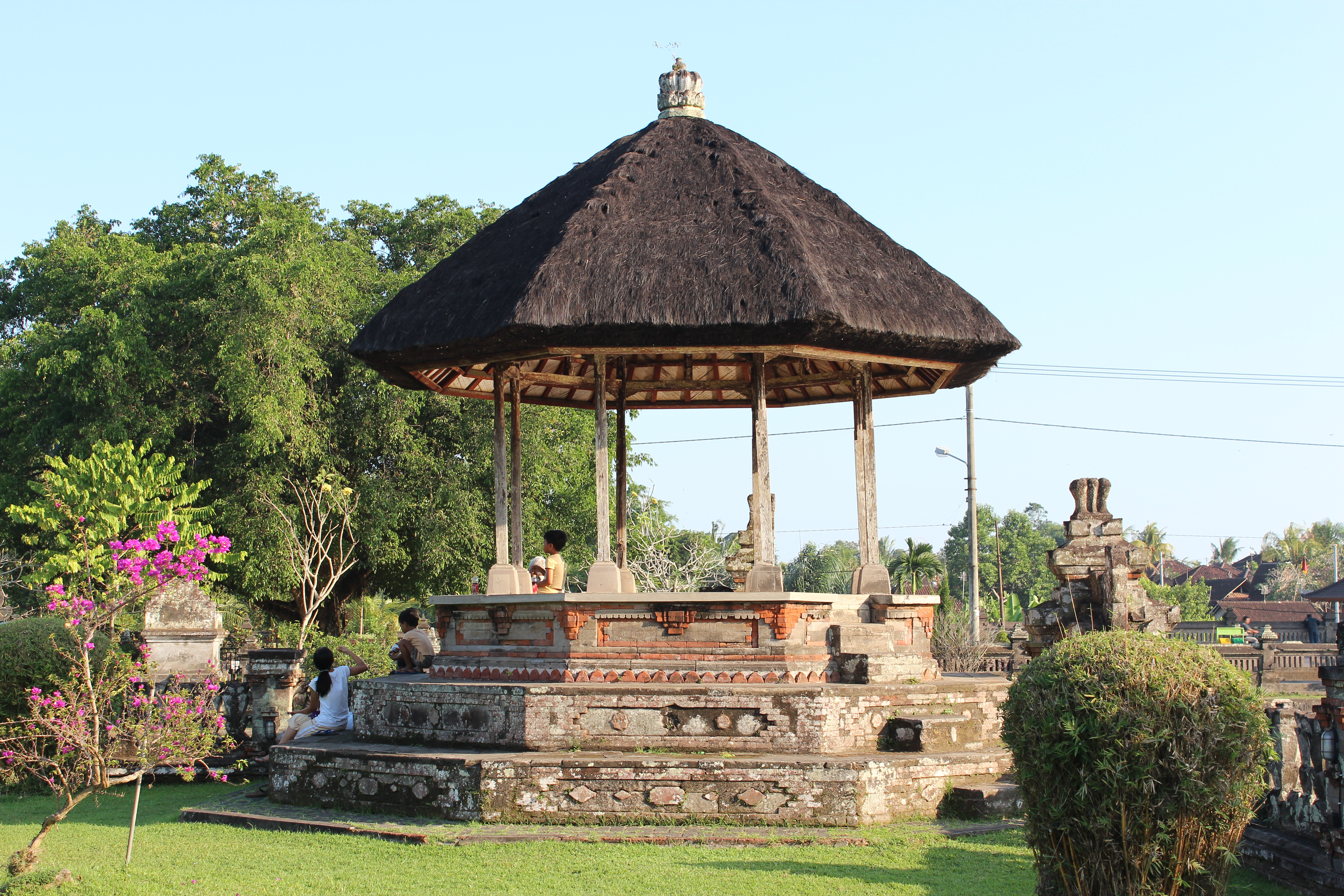
Bale bengong, garden contemplating pavilion.

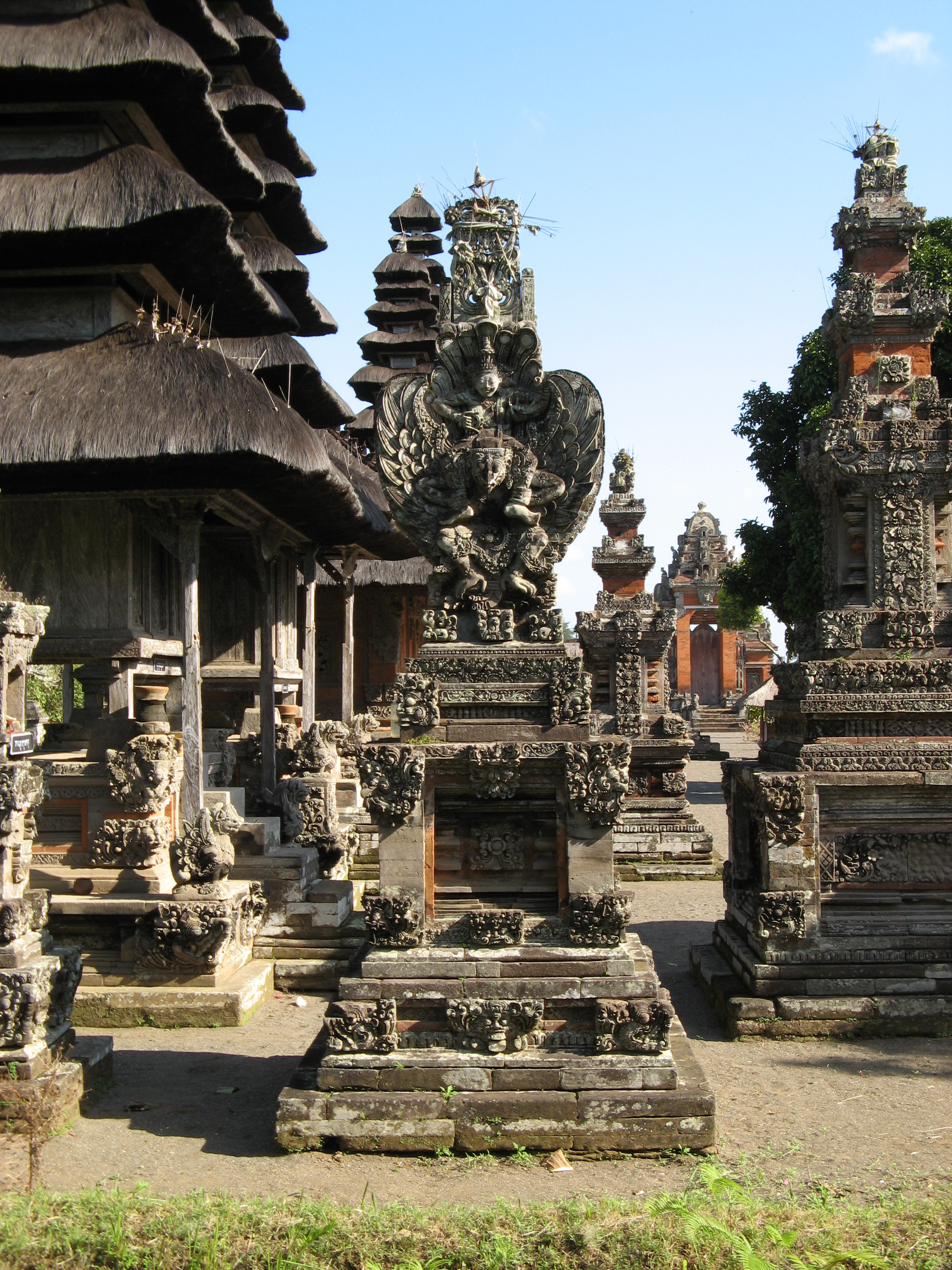
Garuda shrine.

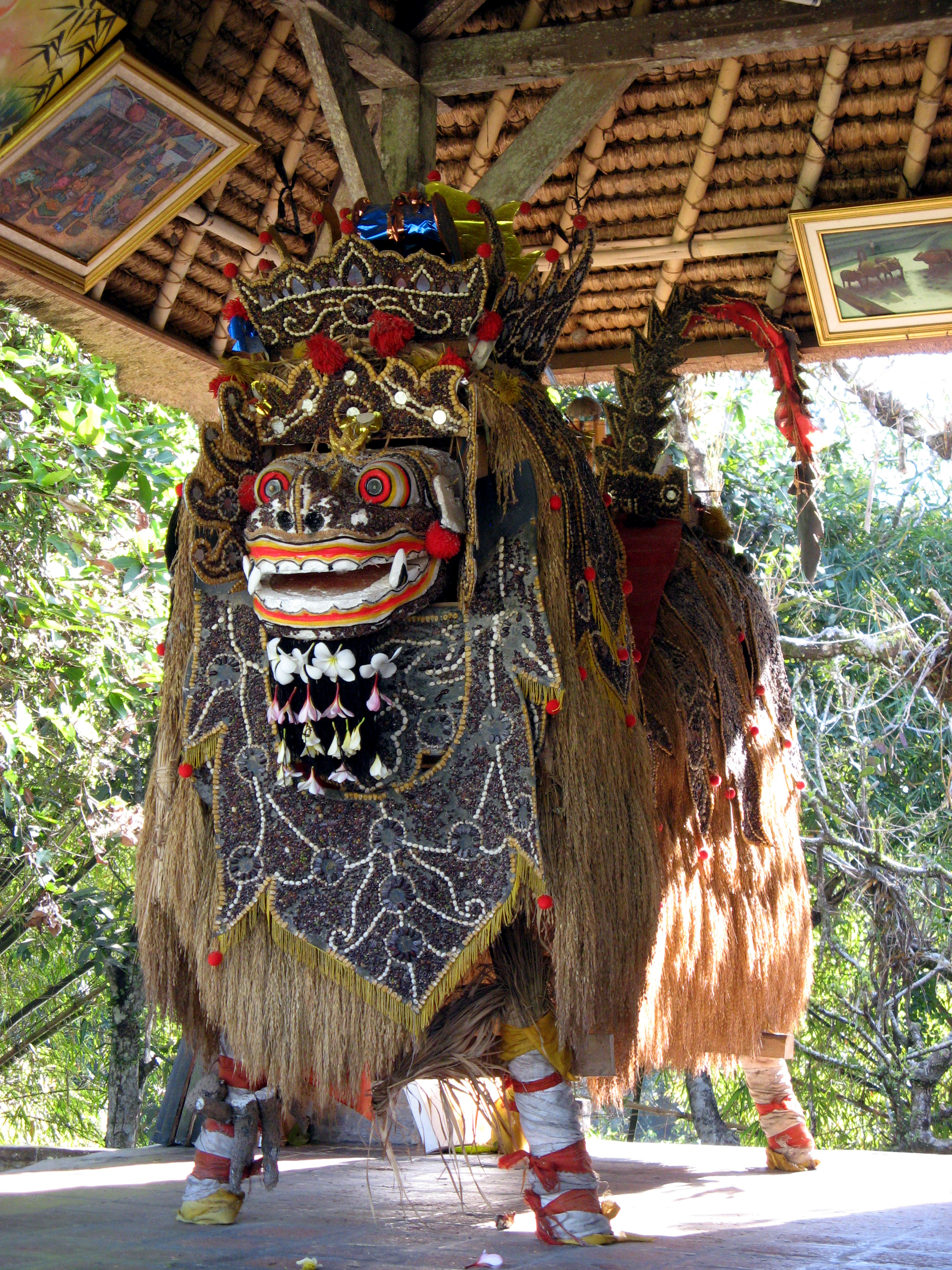
Barong.

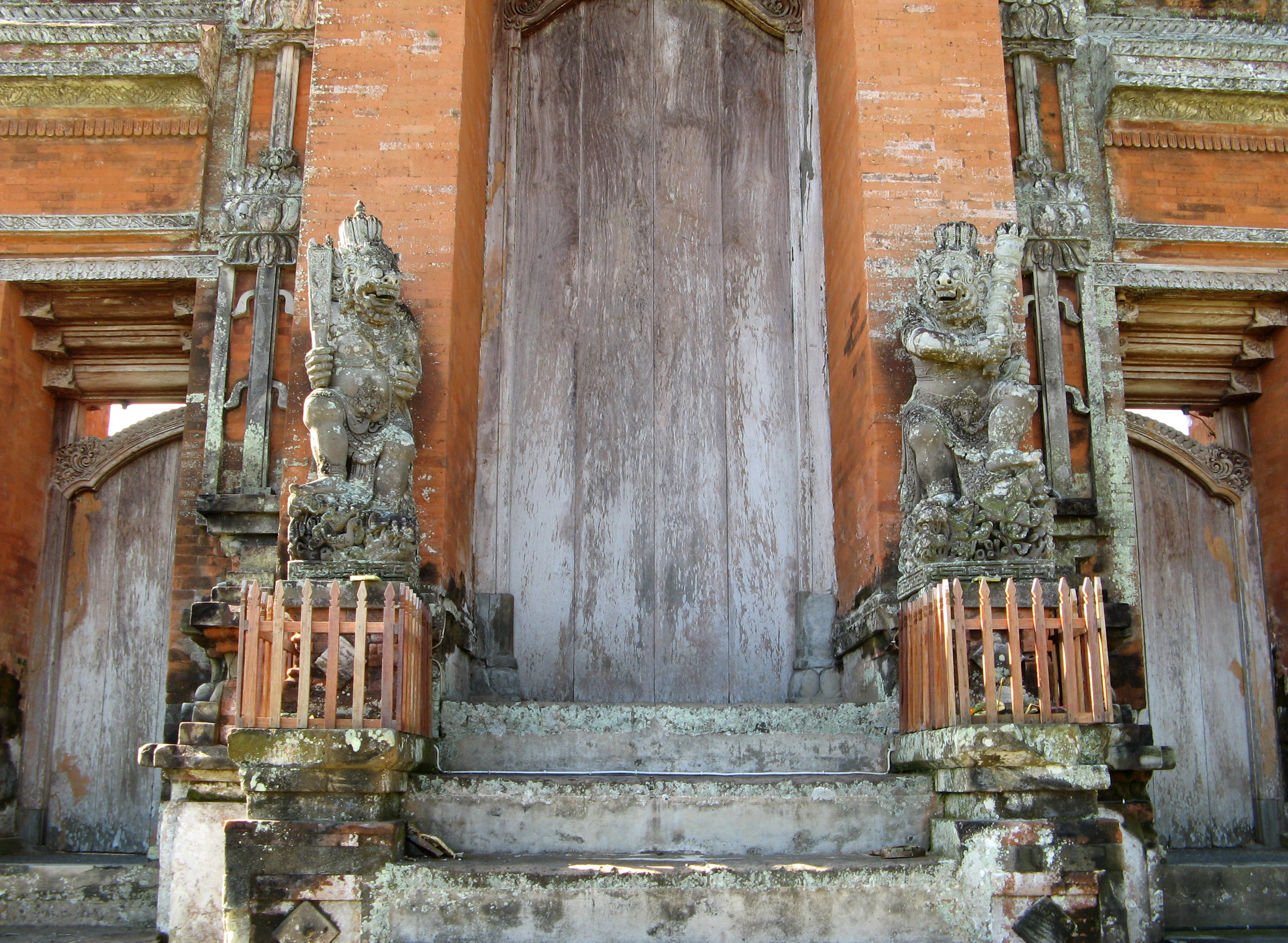
Guardian sculptures with European crowns.

== See also ==
- Tan Hu Cin Jin
