= Tri Hita Karana =

Balinese philosophy of harmony

Tri Hita Karana is a central philosophy as part of Balinese Hinduism the dominant religion practiced on the island of Bali, Indonesia. The literal translation is roughly the "three causes of well-being" or "three reasons for prosperity."

The three causes referred to in the principle are:

1. Harmony with God
2. Harmony among people
3. Harmony with nature or environment

It is derived from the Balinese Hinduism and beliefs, which promotes harmony among fellow human beings through communal cooperation and promoting compassion; harmony towards God, manifested in numerous rituals and offerings to appease the Hindu deities; and harmony with their environment, which strive to conserve the nature and promote the sustainability and balance of the environment. Tri Hita Karana is credited for the island's prosperity as a whole, its relatively stable record of development, environmental practices, and the overall quality of life for its residents.

The principle of Tri Hita Karana guides many aspects of Balinese life, from daily rituals, communal gotong-royong cooperation practice, to spatial organization in Balinese architecture. It is also reflected in the natural irrigation system on the island known as subak, which consists of cooperatively managed weirs and canals that draw from a single water source.

The principles of Tri Hita Karana (THK) and their manifestation in the social organization of Balinese society have been the subject of international research. Major works on this topic have been produced by prominent American anthropologists such as Clifford Geertz and Stephen Lansing. Since the late 20th century, Indonesian authorities have sought to promote the image of the traditional Balinese community living according to the ideas of THK, primarily targeting an international audience and aiming to increase Bali’s tourist appeal.

In 2012, the irrigation system of Balinese subak was inscribed on the UNESCO World Heritage List specifically as a material embodiment of the philosophy of Tri Hita Karana.
