= Meru tower =

Principal shrine of a Balinese temple

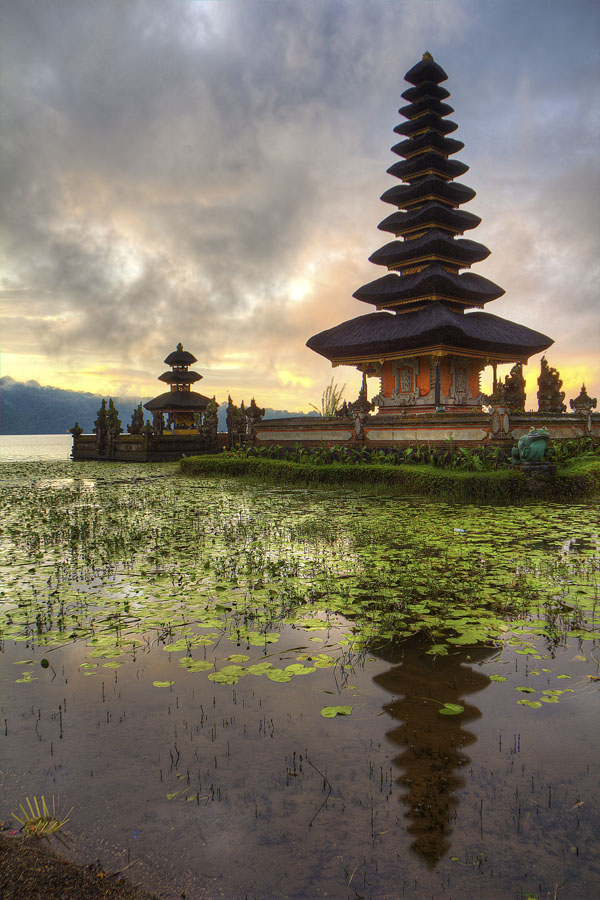
The meru of Pura Ulun Danu Bratan is dedicated to Shiva and his consort Parvathi.

A Meru tower, or pelinggih meru, is the principal shrine of a Balinese temple. It is a wooden, pagoda-like structure with a masonry base, a wooden chamber, and multi-tiered thatched roofs. The height of Meru towers represents the Hindu Mount Meru. Meru towers are usually dedicated to either the highest gods of the Hindu pantheon, the local pantheon, or a deified person.

The Meru tower is the equivalent of the shikhara (north India) or vimana (South India) in Indian Hindu temple architecture. The Hindu tempels on the Indonesian island Java also had shikharas, but in the 14th century a transition started towards multi-tiered thatched roofs. The main temple of the Candi Panataran, the state temple complex of the kingdom of Majapahit, had a pagoda-like thatched structure, just as some other sanctuaries built both in Java and Bali in this period. Bali was part of Majapahit at the time. Many shikharas in Java collapsed because of the frequent earthquakes hitting this island. It was easier to restore a meru than a stone shikhara.

== Description ==
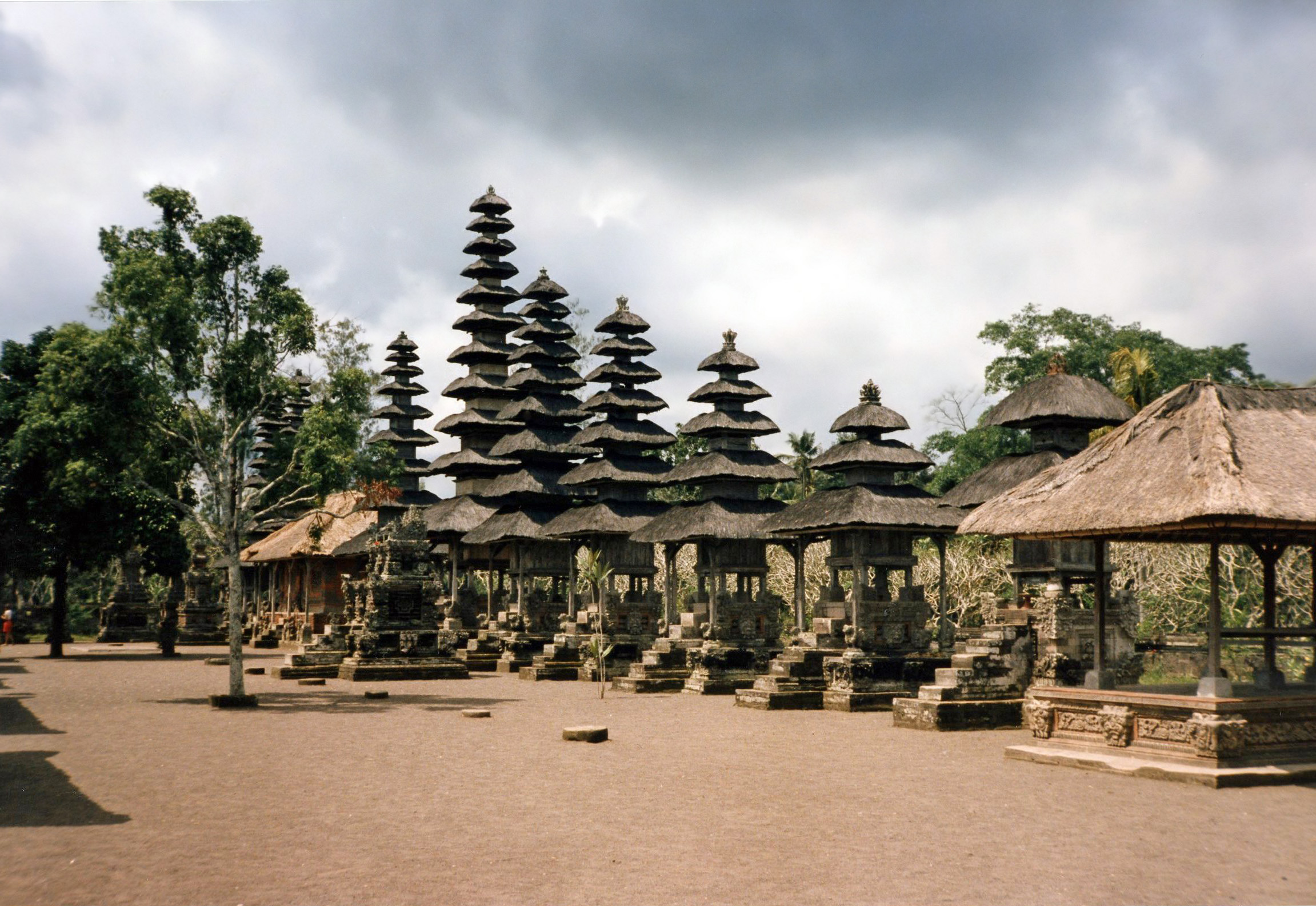
A number of meru towers in different tiers height at Pura Taman Ayun, Bali.

Meru towers consist of a masonry base of about a meter height. Above this platform is a wooden chamber raised on stilts. The wooden chamber is surmounted by a series of fiber thatched roofs of diminishing size. The multi-tiered meru towers usually uses ijuk, which is black aren fibers as thatched roof material. Various sacred objects were buried or placed in parts of the meru.

A Meru tower is identified with the Mount Meru of Hindu mythology, the abode of the Hindu gods. They are always positioned in the innermost sanctum (jero) of a Balinese temple. Individual meru tower is dedicated to a specific Hindu gods, a deified ancestor, or to a local deity of a particular location (Sthana Devata) or high geographical features usually a local mountain. The meru would serve as the "temporary palace" for the gods, which is based on a Balinese idea that a god would take a temporary palace in the meru during certain ceremony.

The multi-tiered thatched roofs is the most recognizable feature of the meru towers. The number of roofs is always odd and reflects the status of the deity to whom the shrine is dedicated. The lowest meru contains three tiers, while the most prestigious meru contains 11 tiers.

A three-tiered meru tower is usually dedicated to a deified ancestor. The central shrine of the Pura Luhur Uluwatu is a three-tiered meru tower dedicated to 12th-century reformer priest Dang Hyang Nirartha (later deified as Betara Sakti Wawu Rauh). The low-tiered meru towers of Pura Taman Ayun are dedicated to the old kings of the Kingdom of Mengwi. Other three-tiered meru is dedicated for the local god of Gunung Lebak, Bhatara Danu.

A five-tiered meru tower is dedicated to the god of Mount Agung, Bhatara Mahajaya.

An eleven-tiered meru towers is usually dedicated to the highest gods of the Hindu pantheon. The eleven-tiered meru of Pura Ulun Danu Bratan is dedicated to Shiva and his consort Parvati. The Pura Meru of Lombok contains three meru towers dedicated to the Trimurti.

== Construction ==
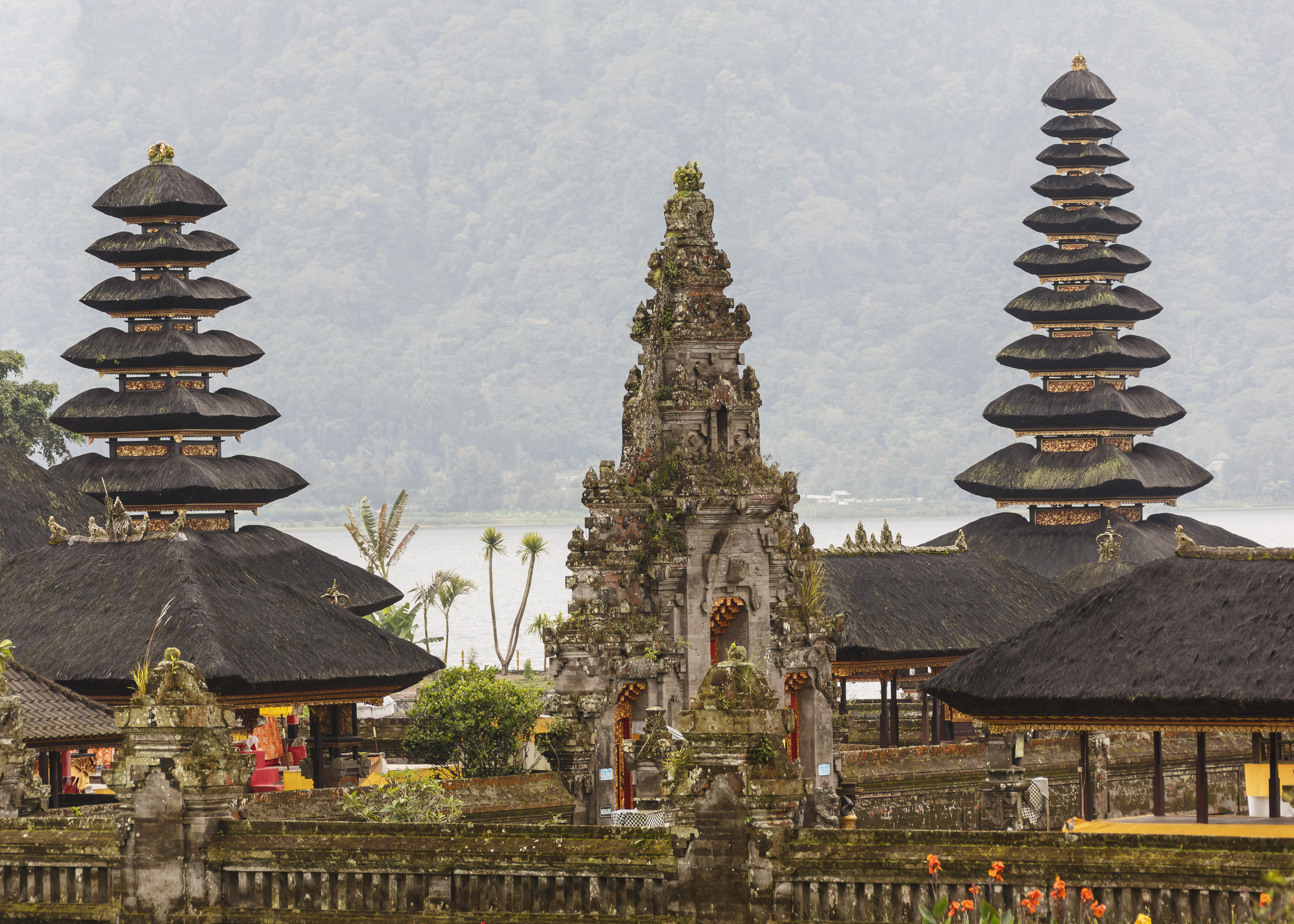
Two meru towers of different height in Pura Ulun Danu in Bratan. The structure at the center of the photograph is a kori agung gateway.

The construction of a meru requires a special construction rite. Three pripihs must be properly placed in a meru: at the peak of the roof, in the wooden main chamber, and beneath the base. Objects were in various places of the meru to enable a meru to become a proper receptacle for gods to enter the meru tower.

The most important objects to be prepared in a meru is the pripih. A pripih serves as a receptacle for the god's intrinsic essence. It is prepared in a meru so that a god can lodge himself into the meru. A pripih is basically a thin plate made of five pieces of metal (pancadatu, of iron, copper, gold, silver and lead) on which cabalistic symbols (rajahan) have been inscribed. A pripih would then be wrapped up in alang-alang grass, flowers, herbs, and cotton cloth, all tied together by a red, white, and black string (tridatu string). The pripih is essentially more important than a statue representing the god physical form (upami), and for this reason a pripih is much more usual than an image of a god in a meru. The pripih is fixed to a base made of small coins and placed in either a cucupu (a box made from gold, silver, or a stone) or a sangku (an earthenware vessel). This container will be placed in the meru's wooden chamber or buried in its base. If the pripih is properly placed, the temple will be safe from destruction.

Also in the wooden chamber, various objects representing miniature furnishings (paměrah) necessary for the daily requirements of a god are prepared.

Another pripih is placed on the top of the meru. Where the rafters of the uppermost roof meet, there is a vertical column with a cavity (pĕtaka meaning flag) into which is placed a small box containing nine precious stones (navaratna). The central precious stone represents the god Shiva, while 8 precious stones surrounding represent the eight gods of the heavenly direction.

Excavations in Java reveal similar ritual practices were employed in the construction of the great Hindu-Buddhist temples of Indonesia's classical era.

== See also ==
- Javanese culture
- Architecture of Indonesia
- Pyatthat, Burmese equivalent

== Cited works ==
- Auger, Timothy, ed. (2001). Bali & Lombok. Eyewitness Travel Guides. London: Dorling Kindersley. ISBN 0751368709.
- Davison, Julian (2003). Balinese architecture. Singapore: Tuttle Publishing. ISBN 9780794600716.
- Eiseman, Fred B. Jr. (2011). Bali - Sekala & Niskala: Essays on religion, ritual, and art. Tuttle Publishing. ISBN 9781462900923.
- Kinney, Ann R. (2003). Worshiping Siva and Buddha: The Temple Art of East Java. University of Hawai'i Press. ISBN 9789004102156.
- Soekmono, R. (1995). Fontein, Jan (ed.). The Javanese Candi: Function and Meaning. Studies in Asian Art and Archaeology. Vol. 17. Leiden: E.J. Brill. ISBN 0824827791.
