= Seririt =

District in Buleleng Regency, Bali Province, Indonesia

- District
- Location of Seririt District within Buleleng Regency
- Country: Indonesia
- Region: Lesser Sunda Islands
- Province: Bali
- Regency: Buleleng

Area
  - Total: 123.09 km^{2} (47.53 sq mi)

Population
  - Total: 95,239
  - Density: 773.73/km^{2} (2,004.0/sq mi)

Seririt is an administrative district (kecamatan) in Buleleng Regency in northern Bali, Indonesia. It is bounded by the Bali Sea to the north, and by the districts of Banjar to the east, Busungbiu to the south, and Gerokgak to the west, although it also has a short boundary with Jembrana Regency to the southwest. It covers an area of 123.09 km² and has a population of 69,572 at the 2010 Census and 93,412 at the 2020 Census; the latest official estimate (as at mid 2025) is 95,239.

Its centre of administration is the town of Seririt.

== Towns and Villages ==
The district is sub-divided into the town (kelurahan) of Seririt and 20 rural villages (desa) - all sharing the post code 81153 - as follows:

- 2001 Unggahan
- 2002 Ularan
- 2003 Ringdikit
- 2004 Rangdu
- 2005 Mayong
- 2006 Gunungsari
- 2007 Mundok Bestala
- 2008 Bestala
- 2009 Kalianget
- 2010 Joanyar
- 2011 Tangguwisia
- 2012 Sulanyah
- 2013 Bubunan
- 2014 Patemoh
- 1015 Seririt (town)
- 2016 Pengastulan
- 2017 Lokapaksa
- 2018 Pangkungparuk
- 2019 Banjarasem
- 2020 Kalisada
- 2021 Umeanyar
