= Seririt (town) =

- Location within Bali
- Coordinates: 8°11′37″S 114°55′59″E
- Country: Indonesia
- Region: Lesser Sunda Islands
- Island: Bali
- Regency: Buleleng
- Kecamatan: Seririt

Seririt (town) is a small town and capital of Seririt District in the regency of Buleleng in northern Bali, Indonesia.
