= Gerokgak, Buleleng =

District in Buleleng Regency, Bali Province, Indonesia

Gerokgak
- District

- Location within Buleleng and Bali
- Coordinates: 8°11′08″S 114°47′27″E
- Country: Indonesia
- Province: Bali
- Regency: Buleleng Regency

Gerokgak is an administrative district (kecamatan) (and also a village (desa) within that district) in the Buleleng Regency, situated on the north-west coast of Bali, Indonesia.

== Description ==
The district extends along the north-west coast of Bali, from the westernmost point of the island to Tegallengah (not included). To the south is Jembrana Regency, and to the east is Seririt District in Buleleng Regency.

It includes most of West Bali National Park.

== Towns and Villages ==
The district is sub-divided into 14 rural villages (desa) - all sharing the post code 81155 - as follows:

- 2001 Sumberklampok (Sumber Klampok)
- 2002 Pejarakan
- 2003 Sumberkima
- 2004 Pemuteran
- 2005 Banyupoh
- 2006 Penyambangan (Penyabangan)
- 2007 Musi
- 2008 Sanggalangit
- 2009 Gerokgak (desa)
- 2010 Patas
- 2011 Pengulon
- 2012 Tinga-tinga (Tinga Tinga)
- 2013 Celukanbawang (Celukan Bawang)
- 2014 Tukadsumaga (Tukad Sulaga)

== Reef conservation and turtle protection in Pemuteran Bay ==
This project started with Australian Chris Brown, who first came to Permuteran in 1991. The following year he started the Reef Seen Divers’ Resort - which started restoration work on the coral reefs, badly damaged by fishing with poison and explosives. Gathering the local population, friends and diver colleagues around the project, his "Reef Gardeners" showed the local fishermen how to catch crown-of-thorns starfish (over 75,000 crown-of-thorns removed between 1996 and 1998) and horn drupe (Drupella cornus), which also threaten the reefs; and how to repair broken corals, thus saving hundreds of years of coral growth. They also installed structures on the ocean floor to create artificial reefs. In 2005, with funding from AusAid, they began to install statues of Buddha off the coast; this Temple garden soon became an attraction for scuba diving tourists. This success was followed from 2014 on with the undertaking of the Garden of the gods half a kilometer away, another offcoast assemblage of statues at 28 meters deep, complete with split gate and 25 beautifully carved statues sitting beside a damaged coral reef (Note: The unterwater temple or "Garden of the gods" represents the Dewata Nawa Sanga or "Guardians of the Nine Directions", the nine gods of Bali, placed in an octagonal mandala with Shiva sitting on a turtle in the middle, surrounded by the other 8 gods placed in accordance to their attributed directions of the winds or compass points. There are also dancers, musicians, benches, fountains and lanterns. Pieces of live corals were planted in holes in the statues' bases to help their propagation.) and covering 2,500 square metres of sandy seabed at a depth from 5 to 30 metres. All this work is tightly linked with the local community.
Meanwhile, Reef Seen also started in 1994 the Turtle Project of Pemuteran, which aims at protecting the wild turtle population. It rewards people who bring in or signal newly-laid sea turtle’s eggs, which encourages villagers not to kill or capture mature turtles who can then return and lay more eggs. Reef Seen's hatchery takes care of the collected eggs and the hatchlings are released at sea when they are big enough to get a fair chance at survival. Different seasons see three different species in the hatchery: Green, Olive Ridley, and Hawksbill. On top of its educational work, over the years its hatchery has allowed the release of several thousands of turtles (juveniles and adults) into the ocean.

A collaboration started in 2000 between the Karang Lestari Foundation (chairman in 2012: I Gusti Agung Prana) and the Global Coral Reef Alliance, leading to the installation of about 70 underwater 'bio-rocks' over half a kilometer. Many awards have been received by the project:

- 2002, Konas Award from the Maritime Affairs and Fisheries Ministry for the Best Community Based Coastal Management
- 2005, The Asianta Award and Kalpataru Award from the President of Indonesia
- 2007, The Pioneering Award from the Bali Administration
- 2008, The Pacific Asia Travel Association (PATA) Gold Award
- 2011, Tri Hita Karana Award
- 2012, The Equator Prize Award by the United Nations Development Programme (UNDP) and UNDP Special Award for Marine and Coastal Zone Management

=== Other reefs nearby ===
These are only some of the shallows that lay near Pemuteran.

Napoleon Reef

This reef, from 5 to 30 metres deep, has an upper area about the size of half a football field that gently slopes down on each side, and three underwater peninsulas that reach out to deeper levels.

Kebun Chris

Just 20 metres away from the shore in front of Reefs Seen, it was the first reef to benefit from protection, hard work and care and is accordingly rich in diversity. Its depth is from 2 to 15 metres;

Middle Reef

It has suffered severe damage in the early 1990's but has started to recover (after 2010). Its depth goes from 16 to 30 metres.

Temple Wall

This reef sits directly in front of 3 seaside temples, amidst nutrient-rich currents, with depths from 3 to 26 metres. It has received protection from destructive fishing methods since 1995 and has recovered (after 2010).
