= Buleleng Regency =

Regency in Bali, Indonesia

Buleleng Regency Kabupaten Buleleng
- Regency

Native transcription(s)
  - Balinese: ᬓᬩᬸᬧᬢᬾᬦ᭄ᬩᬸᬮᬾᬮᬾᬂ Kabupatén Buléléng
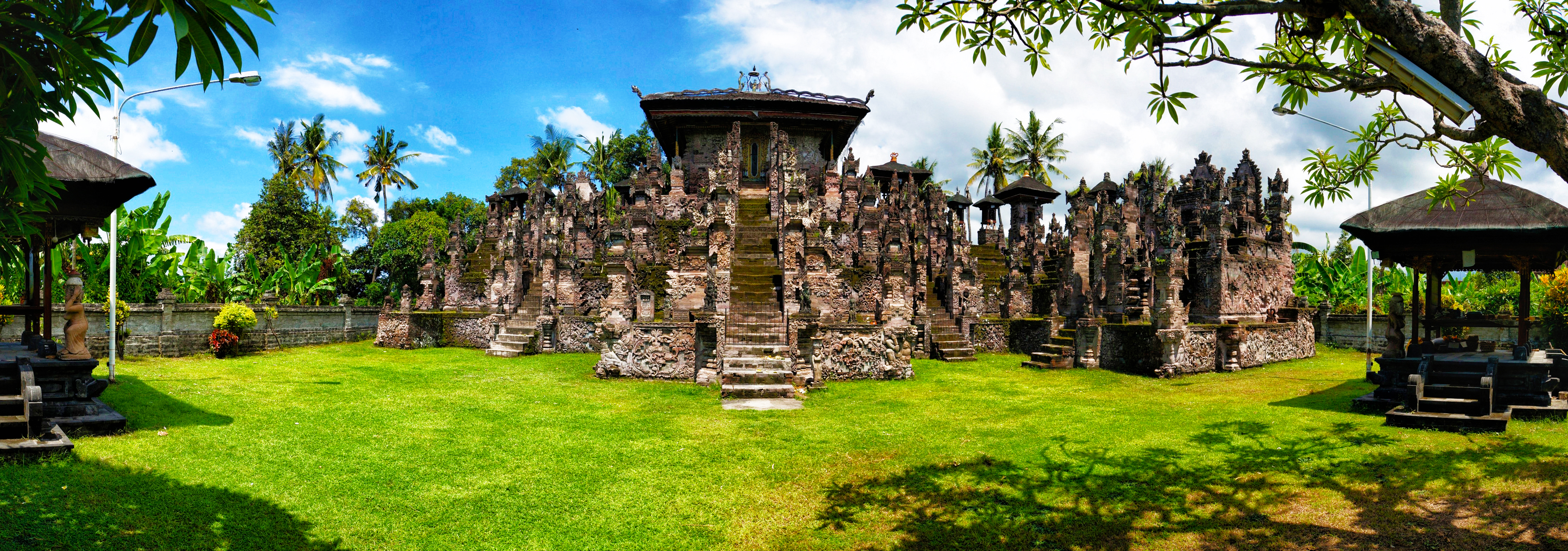
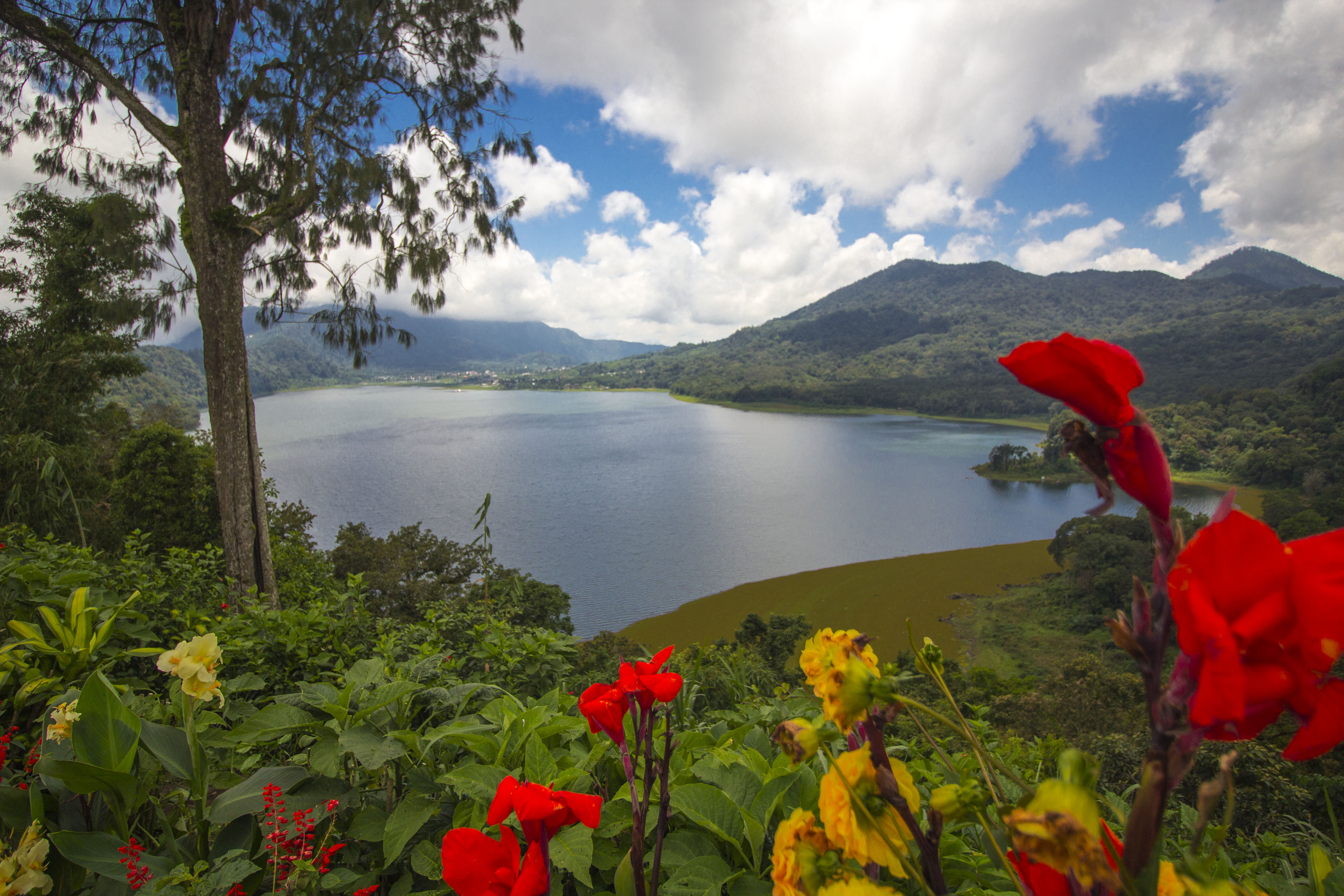
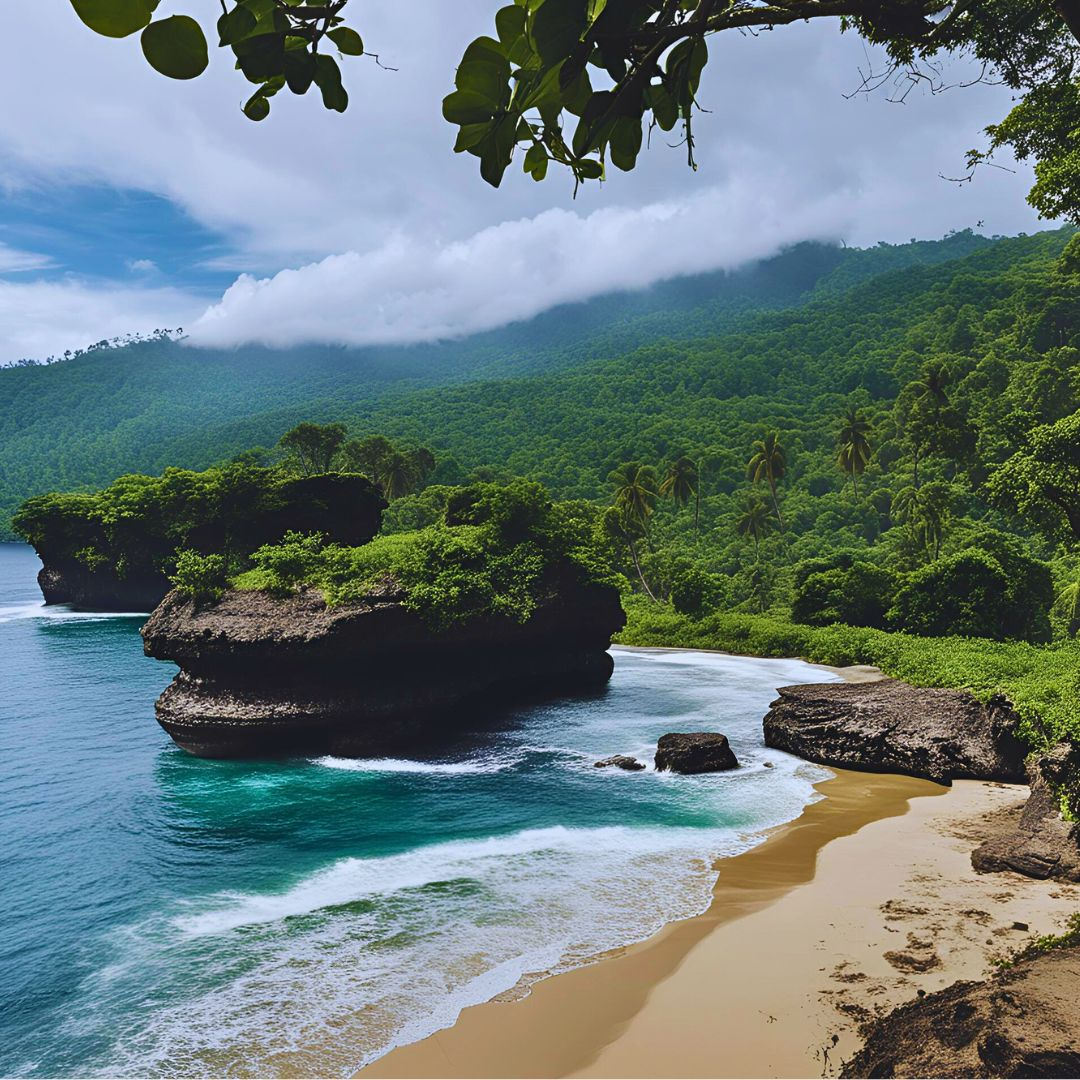
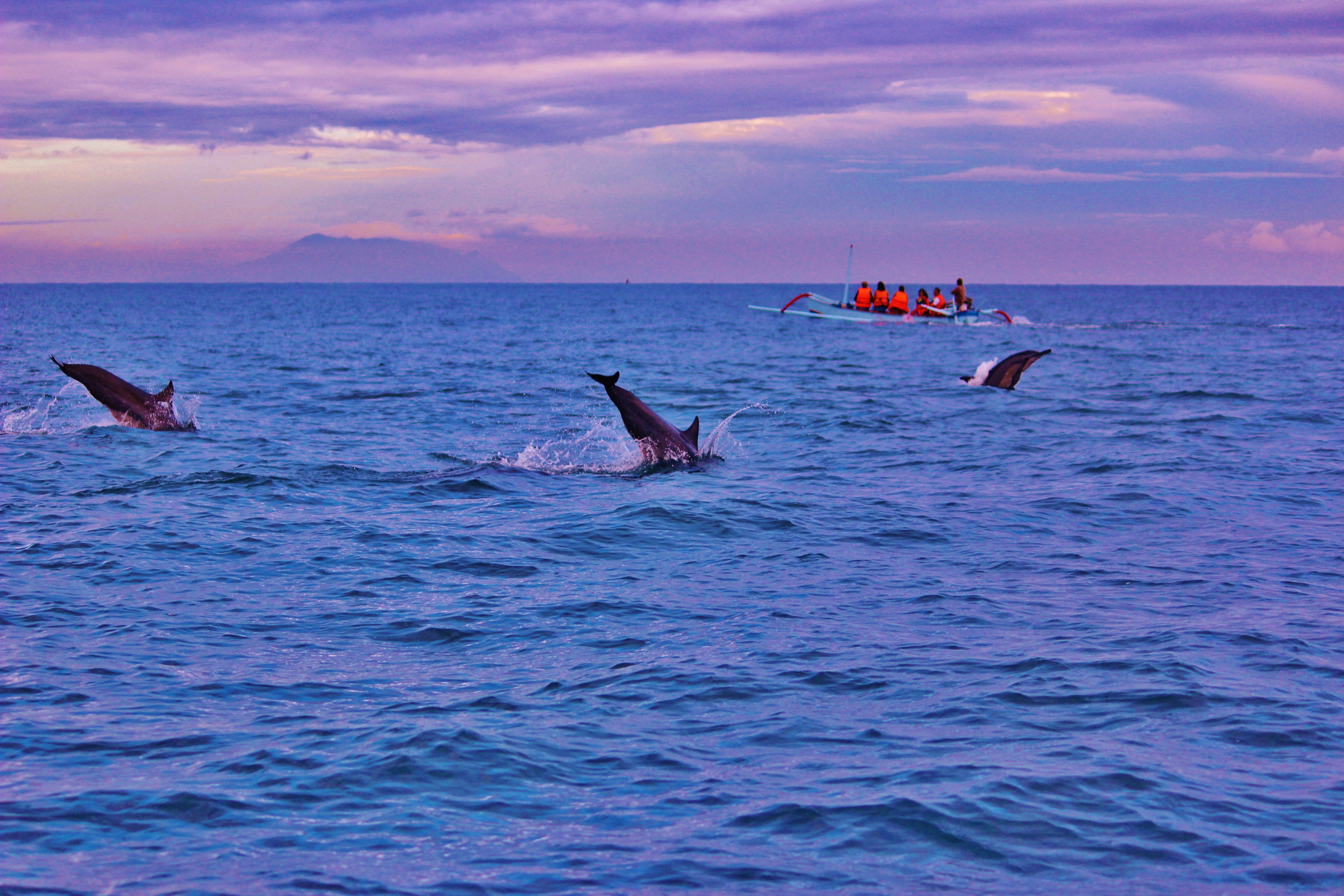
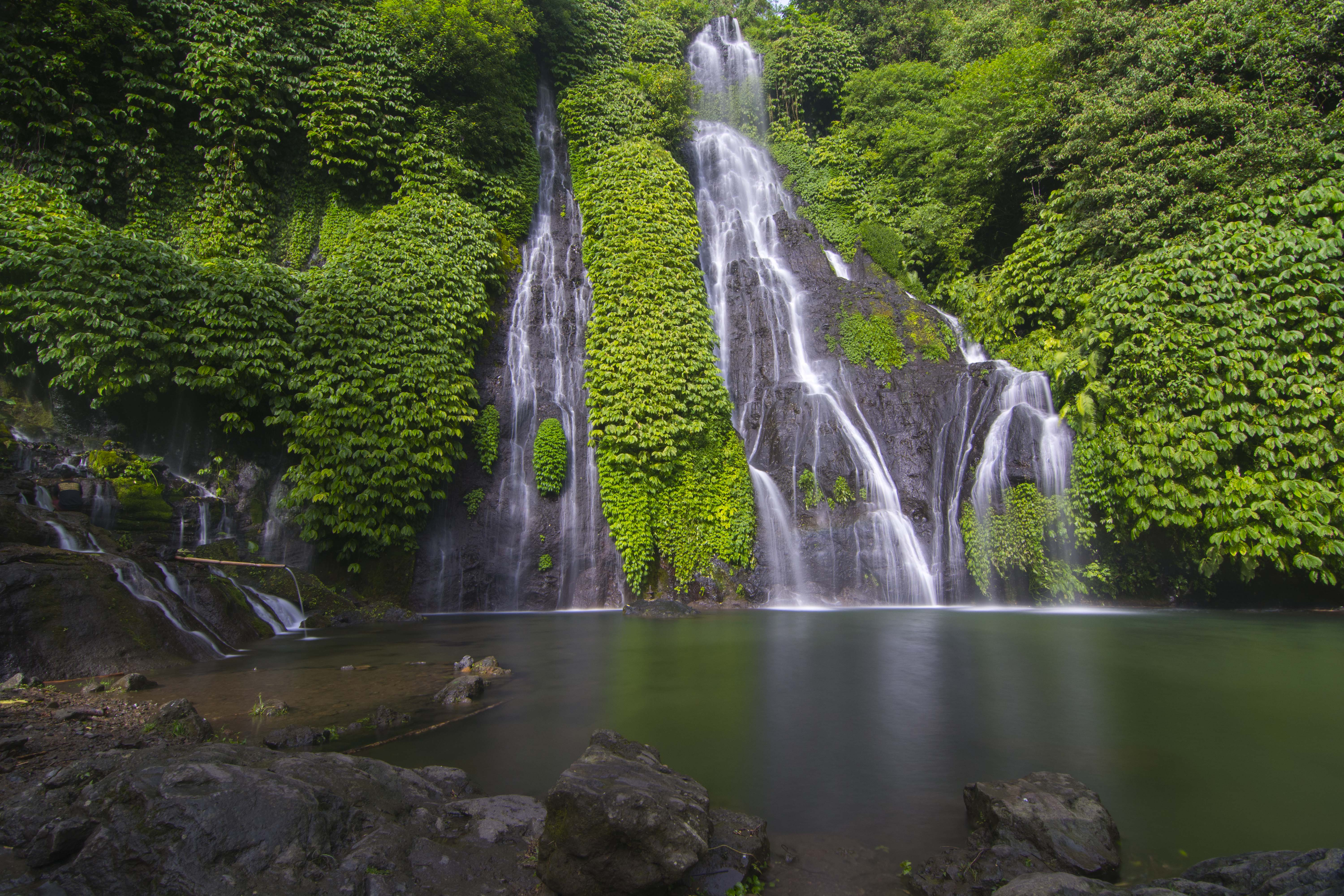
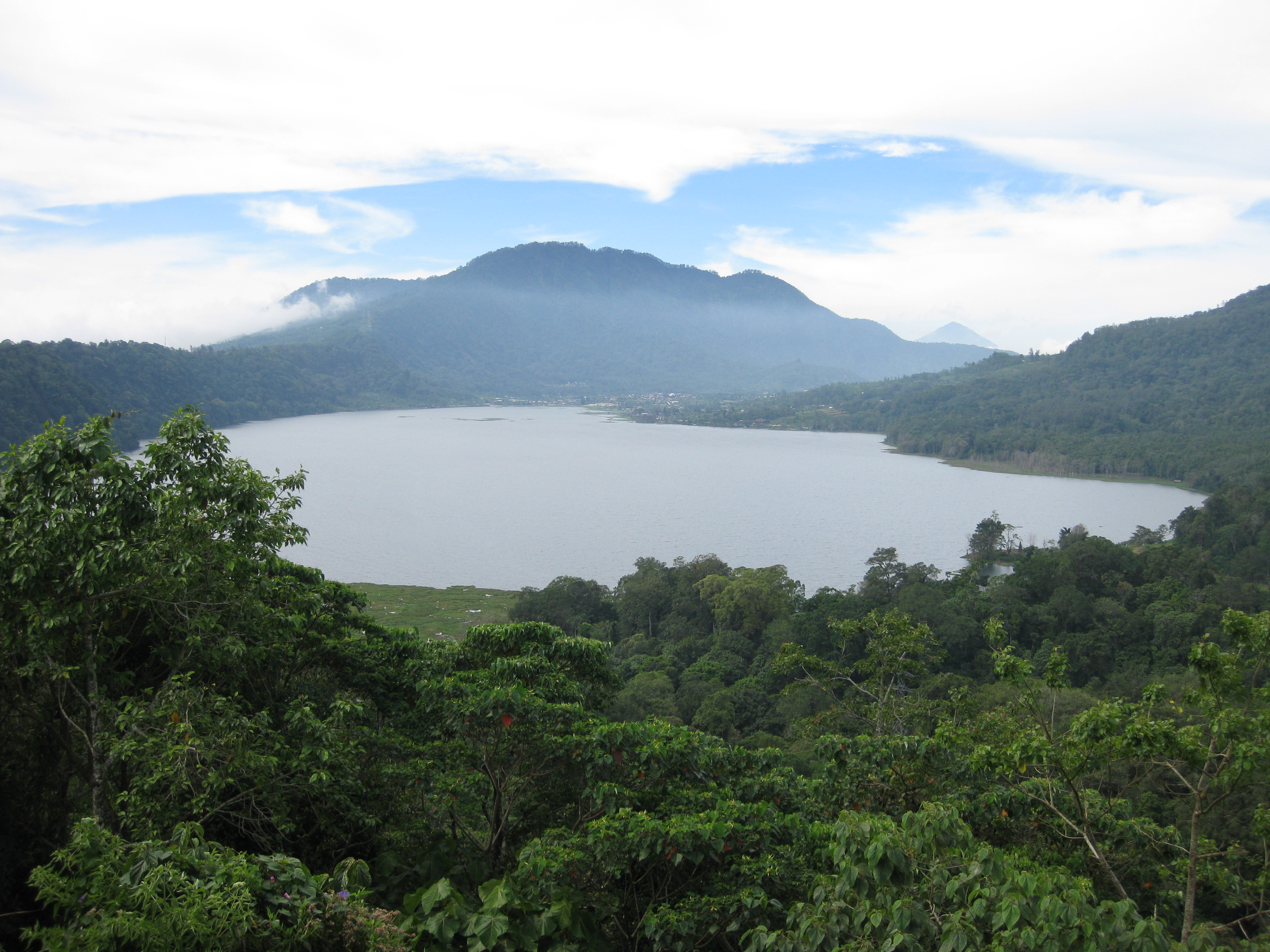
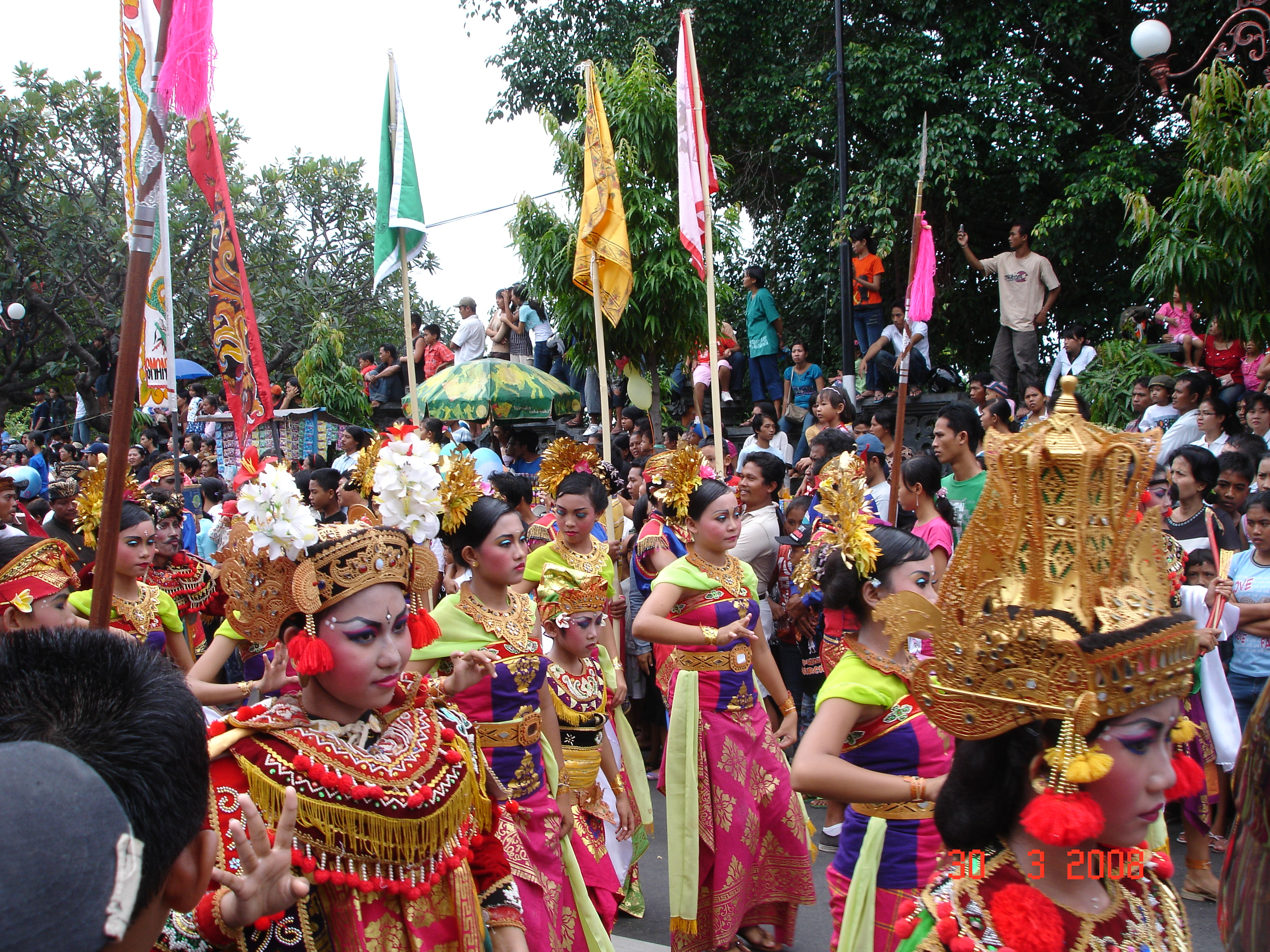
- Beji Sangsit Temple Lake Buyan West Bali National Park Lovina Beach Banyumala Waterfall Lake Tamblingan Singaraja Festival

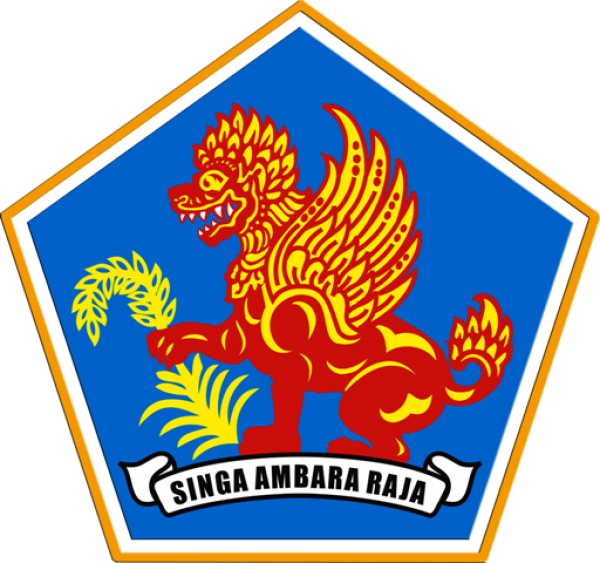
- Coat of arms
- Nicknames: Gumi Panji Sakti ('Land of Panji Sakti')
- Motto: Singa Ambara Raja ᬲᬶᬗᬅᬫ᭄ᬩᬭᬭᬚ
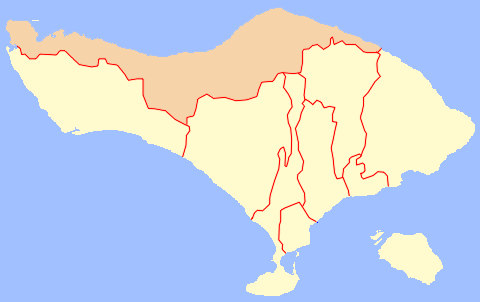
- Location within Bali

- Location in Bali Location in Lesser Sunda Islands Location in Indonesia Location in Southeast Asia Location in Asia
- Coordinates: 8°15′S 114°55′E
- Country: Indonesia
- Region: Lesser Sunda Islands
- Province: Bali
- Districts: List: Gerokgak; Seririt; Busungbiu; Banjar; Sukasada; Buleleng; Sawan; Kubutambahan; Tejakula
- Established: 14 August 1958
- Capital: Singaraja

Government
  - Body: Buleleng Regency Government
  - Regent: I Nyoman Sutjidra (PDI-P)
  - Vice Regent: Gede Supriatna
  - Legislature: Buleleng Regency Regional House of Representatives (DPRD)

Area
  - Total: 1,322.55 km^{2} (510.64 sq mi)

Population (mid 2025 estimate)
  - Total: 832,299
  - Density: 629.314/km^{2} (1,629.92/sq mi)

Demographics
  - Ethnic groups (2010): 92.27% Balinese; 2.41% Javanese; 1.83% Bali Aga; 1.72% Madurese; 0.03% Madurese; 0.33% Bugis; 0.22% Chinese; 0.22% Sasak; 0.14% Sundanese; 0.07% Malays; 0.76% other
  - Religion (2024): 89.26% Hinduism; 9.34% Islam; 0.88% Christianity; 0.67% Protestanism; 0.21% Catholicism; 0.51% Buddhism; 0.01% Confucianism
  - Languages and dialects: Indonesian (official); Balinese (native); Lowland Balinese; Buleleng Balinese; Highland Balinese other
- Time zone: UTC+08:00 (Indonesia Central Time)
- Area code: (+62) 362
- ISO 3166 code: ID-BA (Bali)
- Vehicle registration: DK
- HDI (2023): ▲0.740 high
- Website: bulelengkab.go.id

Buleleng Regency (Indonesian: Kabupaten Buleleng; Balinese: ᬓᬪᬹᬧᬢᬾᬦ᭄ ᬩᬸᬮᬾᬮᬾᬂ, Kabupatén Buléléng), is a regency (kabupaten) of the province of Bali, Indonesia. It stretches along the north side of the island of Bali from the Bali Strait in the west (separating Bali from East Java) almost to the eastern end of the island. It has a land area of 1,322.55 km^{2} and a population of 832,299 in 2025. It is bordered by almost all other regencies in Bali except Klungkung, Gianyar and Denpasar City, and bordered by the Bali Sea and the Java Sea to its north. The regency seat is in the town of Singaraja, whose urban area extends to the whole of Buleleng District.

At the most recent census in 2020, Buleleng Regency's population was 791,813. The official estimate as at mid 2025 was 832,299 (comprising 419,574 males and 412,725 females).

Buleleng was founded as a kingdom by Gusti Panji Sakti, who ruled c. 1660-c. 1700. He is commemorated as a heroic ancestor figure who expanded the power of Buleleng to Blambangan on East Java. The kingdom was weakened during its successors and fell under the suzerainty of the neighbouring Karangasem kingdom in the second half of the 18th century. It was headed by an autonomous branch of the Karangasem Dynasty in 1806–1849.

The Dutch attacked Buleleng in 1846, 1848, and 1849, and defeated it on the last occasion. Buleleng was incorporated into the Dutch colonial system and lost its autonomy in 1882. In 1929 a descendant of Gusti Panji Sakti, the renowned scholar Gusti Putu Jelantik, was appointed regent by the Dutch. He died in 1944, during the Japanese occupation of the Dutch East Indies. His son was a well-known novelist, Anak Agung Nyoman Panji Tisna. In 1947, Anak Agung Pandji Tisna surrendered the throne to his younger brother, Anak Agung Ngurah Ketut Djelantik, known as Meester Djelantik, until 1950. In 1949–50 Buleleng, like the rest of Bali, was incorporated into the unitary republic of Indonesia.

== History ==
=== Protohistory ===
The territory of Pedawa, one of the 62 Bali Aga villages in the island, is the depository of several sarcophagi present at Ingsakan, Banjar Asah, Lebahlinggah, and Tampug. There are also three types of megaliths used in religious rituals and known as taulan (small stones used as symbols of Ida (God) – equivalent to Arca -, found in all main temples of Pedawa village); gainan (a stacked stone located at the Munduk Madeg Temple in Pedawa village), and umah taksu (a stacked stone similar to punden terraces in some areas of Pedawa village). Each of these items is witness to the ancient creation of the village, taking it into prehistoric times They come in par with the megaliths collected in various parts of Bali and gathered at Sanur stone park.

=== Buleleng Kingdom ===
Previously, the area in North Bali or Den Bukit was never united, they fought and attacked each other, until finally this area was united by a man named I Gusti Anglurah Panji Sakti from Dalem Sagening Dynasty by uniting all the areas in North Bali that were in conflict.

Then I Gusti Anglurah Panji Sakti controlled the entire area of North Bali/Den Bukit and began to expand his territory to Jembrana, Karangasem, Bangli, Tabanan and even to Banyuwangi in East Java. After the death of I Gusti Ngurah Panji Sakti in 1704, the Buleleng Kingdom began to falter due to the struggle for power, plus the colonial areas began to rebel and put up resistance such as the Jembrana rebellion in West Bali and the Karangasem resistance in East Bali.

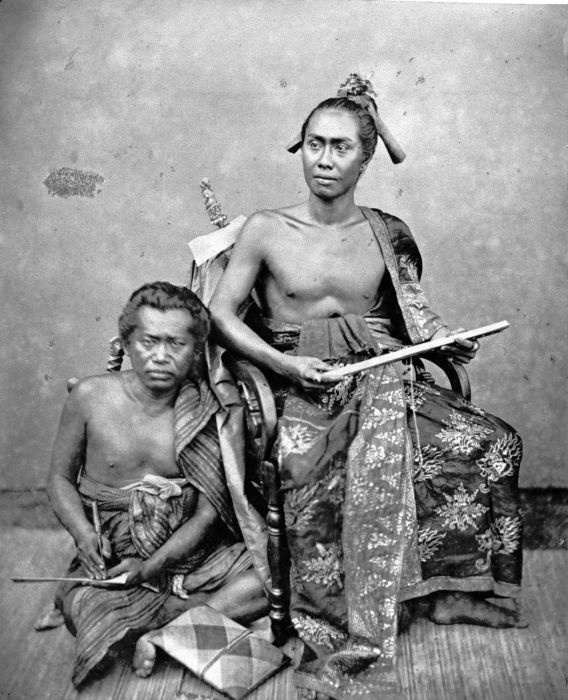
Studio portrait made by Woodbury & Page of the Raja of Buleleng Gusti Jelantik and his secretary C1875.

=== Controlled by Mengwi and Karangasem ===
In 1732, Buleleng was controlled by the Mengwi Kingdom, but they regained their independence in 1752. Subsequently, the Buleleng Kingdom fell under the power of the king of Karangasem in 1780. The King of Karangasem, I Gusti Gede Karang built a palace called "Puri Singaraja". The next king to rule was his son named I Gusti Pahang Canang who ruled until 1821. Karangasem's power then weakened, and there were several changes of king. In 1825, I Gusti Made Karangasem ruled with his patih, I Gusti Ketut Jelantik until it was conquered by the Dutch in 1849.

=== Resistance against Dutch colonialism ===
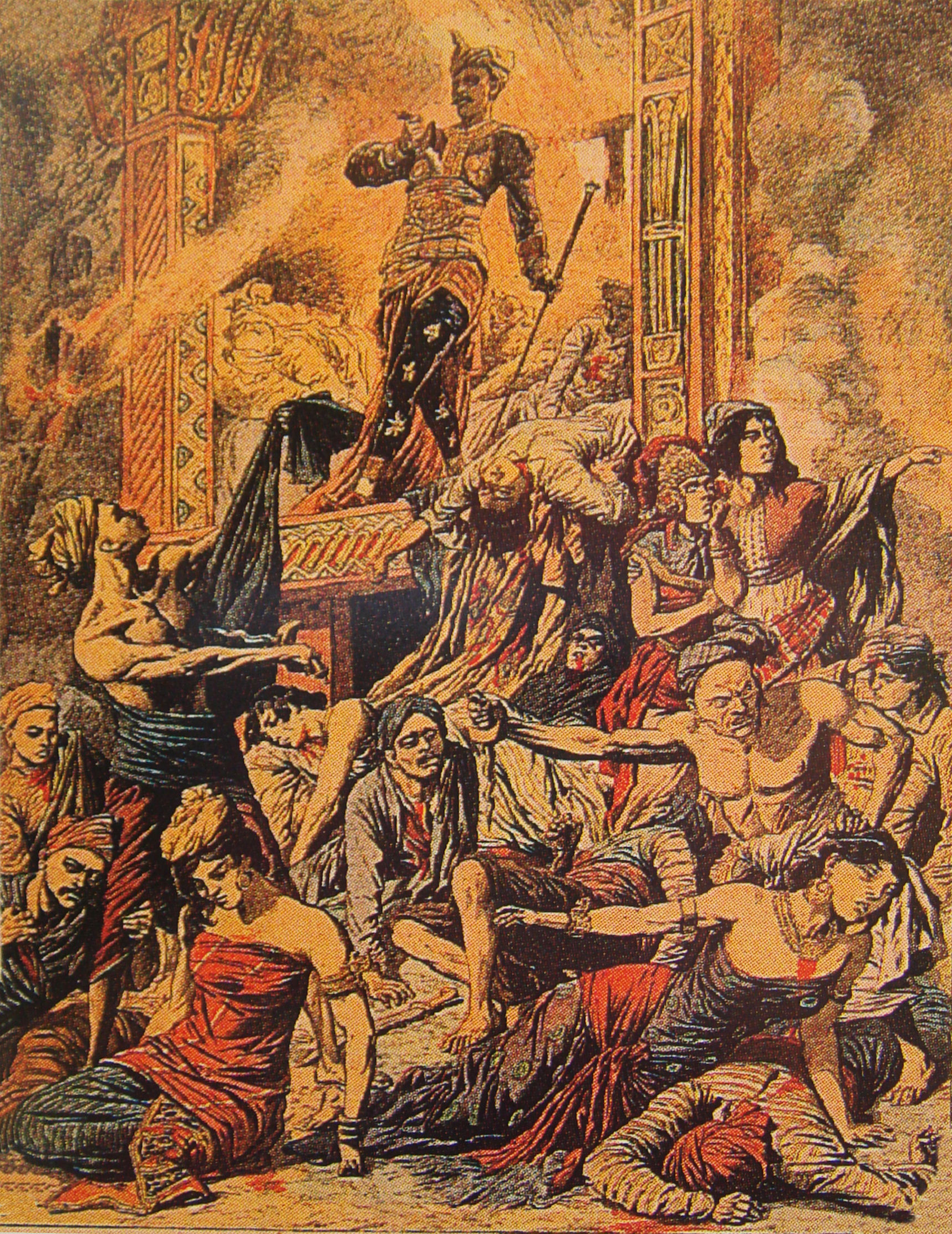
The Raja of Buleleng martyred with 400 followers, in an 1849 puputan against the Dutch. Le Petit Journal, 1849.

In 1846, Buleleng was attacked by Dutch troops, but it met with fierce resistance from the Buleleng community led by the warlord (patih) I Gusti Ketut Jelantik. In 1848, Buleleng was again attacked by Dutch navy troops at Fort Jagaraga. In the third attack, in 1849, the Dutch were finally able to destroy Fort Jagaraga so that Buleleng could be defeated by the Dutch . Since then, Buleleng was controlled by the Dutch East Indies colonial government, the Buleleng region was made a "Swapraja" with the Dutch king as its ruler, the king of Buleleng from the Panji Sakti dynasty was then appointed as regent under colonial supervision.

=== Independence era ===
After the independence of the Republic of Indonesia, the Buleleng Kingdom had the status of the Buleleng Level II Region; the Monarcht system was abolished and replaced by a Regency.

== Geography ==
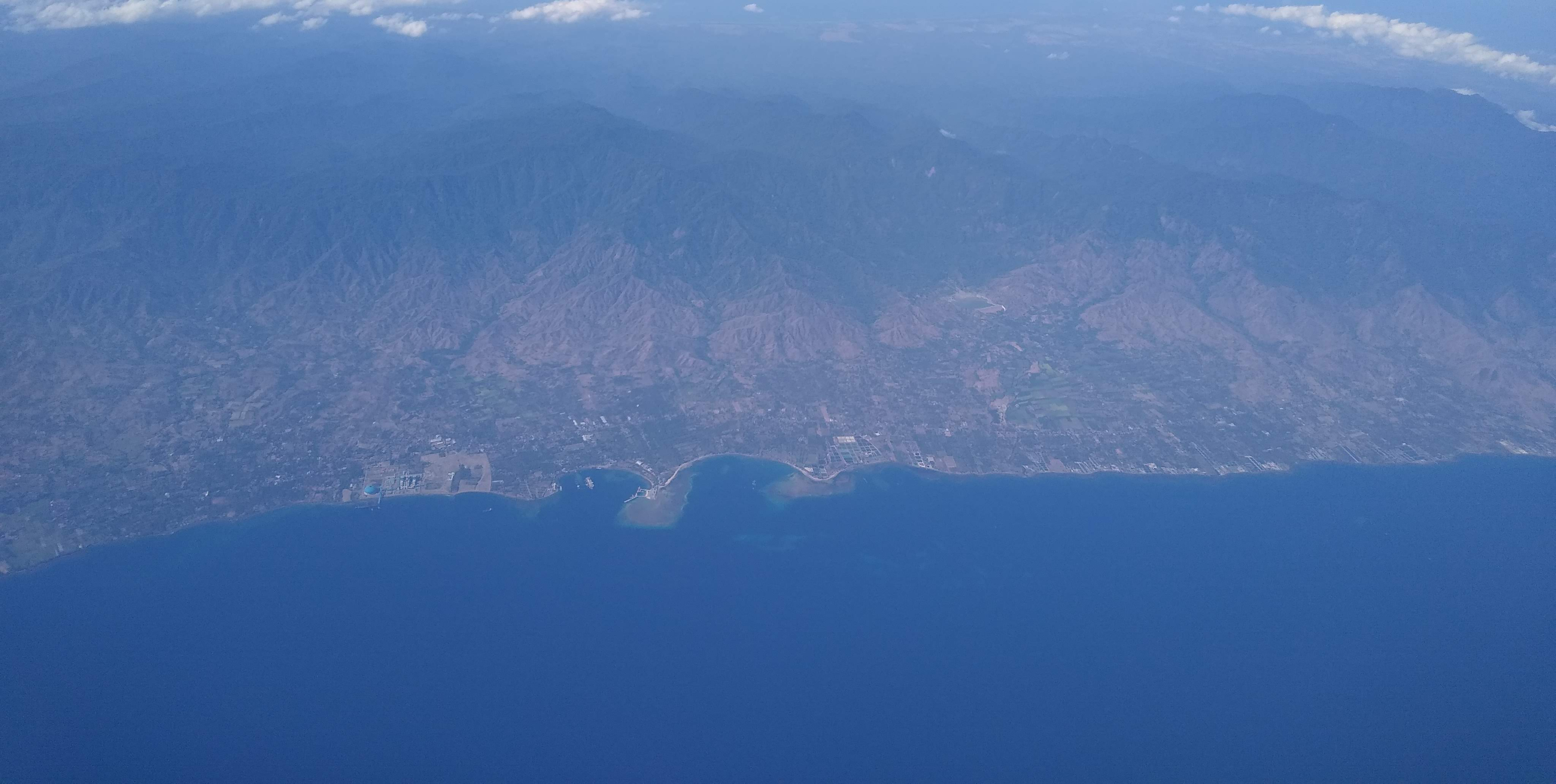
Part of the coast of Buleleng Regency

Geographically, Buleleng Regency is located between 8°3'40"–8°23'00" South Latitude and 114°25'55"–115°27'28" East Longitude, which is located in the northern part of Bali Island. The area of Buleleng Regency is 1,322.55 km^{2} (24.25% of the area of Bali Island). Buleleng Regency consists of 9 administrative districts (kecamatan), subdivided into 129 rural and 19 urban villages, and then into 551 hamlets/banjars and 58 neighborhoods.

=== Borders ===
The borders of Buleleng Regency are as follows:

=== Northern ===
- Bali Sea and northern Java Sea

=== Southern ===
- Kintamani District, Bangli Regency
- Petang District, Bangli Regency Badung
- Tabanan Regency and Jembrana Regency

=== Western ===
- Jembrana Regency and Bali Strait

=== Eastern ===
- Kubu District, Karangasem Regency

=== Topography ===
Buleleng Regency, located in the north of Bali Island, has a very diverse topography, consisting of lowlands, hills, and mountains. Most of the Buleleng Regency area is a hilly and mountainous area stretching in the south, while in the north, namely along the coast, is a lowland. These unique conditions make the topography of Buleleng Regency often called Nyegara Gunung.

The topographic conditions of Buleleng Regency based on the slope, the difference in height from sea level and its landscape can be grouped into 4 (four) topographic units, namely:

1. Flat areas with a slope of 0 – 1.9% covering an area of 12,264.75 Ha or 8.98%;
2. Sloping areas with a slope of 2 – 24.9% covering an area of 70,226 Ha or 51.41%;
3. Sloping areas with a slope of 25 – 39.9% covering an area of 21,462.75 Ha or 15.71%;
4. Steep areas with a slope of above 40% covering an area of 32,634.5 Ha or 23.89%.

Based on the altitude, it is grouped into 4 (four) altitudes, namely:

1. Lowlands (0 – 24.9 m above sea level and 25 – 99.9 m above sea level)
2. Medium Plains (100 – 499.9 m above sea level)
3. Highlands (500 – 999.9 m above sea level)
4. Mountain Plains (> 1000 m above sea level)

=== Geology ===
Stratigraphically, the rock layers found in Buleleng Regency generally consist of bereksi rocks, lava, tuff and lahar, which are spread in almost all areas of Buleleng Regency. There is a fault which is estimated to be in the Gerokgak District area, namely two large arcs that are parallel extending to the west and east which are located in the Pulaki Volcanic Rock Formation which consists of bereksi and lava. Two horizontal faults estimated in the West End of Bali Island (among them the Prapat Agung Formation which is predominantly covered by limestone with the Palasari Formation consisting of sandstone, conglomerate and reef limestone). Two more faults estimated to be in the Tejakula District area are located between the tuff rock formation and the Buyan, Bratan and Batur lava deposits with the Buyan Bratan and Batur Purba formations. In addition to these structures, layering structures are also found on the tuff rock, lava from the Buyan Bratan Purba Group of volcanic rocks.

=== Climate ===
Based on the Köppen climate classification, most of the Buleleng Regency area has a tropical wet and dry climate (Aw) with air temperatures varying based on altitude, namely between 19°–33 °C. The relative humidity level in this area ranges from 82%–75%. Due to its tropical wet and dry climate, the Buleleng region has two seasons, namely the dry season and the rainy season. The dry season in the Buleleng region lasts from May–October with the driest month being August. Meanwhile, the rainy season lasts from December–March with a monthly rainfall of more than 200 mm per month. Between the dry and rainy seasons there is a transitional season which usually occurs in April and November. The annual rainfall in the Buleleng area ranges from 1,000 to 2,300 mm per year with the number of rainy days ranging from 80 to 120 rainy days per year.

Climate data for Buleleng Regency (Singaraja)
Month	Jan	Feb	Mar	Apr	May	Jun	Jul	Aug	Sep	Oct	Nov	Dec	Year
Record high °C (°F)	33.0 (91.4)	33.0 (91.4)	33.0 (91.4)	33.0 (91.4)	33.0 (91.4)	32.0 (89.6)	31.0 (87.8)	31.0 (87.8)	32.0 (89.6)	33.0 (91.4)	33.0 (91.4)	33.0 (91.4)	33.0 (91.4)
Mean daily maximum °C (°F)	29.0 (84.2)	29.0 (84.2)	30.0 (86.0)	30.0 (86.0)	31.0 (87.8)	30.0 (86.0)	29.0 (84.2)	29.0 (84.2)	30.0 (86.0)	31.0 (87.8)	31.0 (87.8)	30.5 (86.9)	31.0 (87.8)
Daily mean °C (°F)	27.0 (80.6)	27.0 (80.6)	27.0 (80.6)	27.0 (80.6)	27.5 (81.5)	27.0 (80.6)	26.5 (79.7)	26.0 (78.8)	26.5 (79.7)	27.0 (80.6)	27.5 (81.5)	27.0 (80.6)	27.0 (80.6)
Mean daily minimum °C (°F)	25.0 (77.0)	25.0 (77.0)	25.0 (77.0)	25.0 (77.0)	24.5 (76.1)	24.0 (75.2)	24.0 (75.2)	23.5 (74.3)	24.0 (75.2)	24.0 (75.2)	25.0 (77.0)	25.0 (77.0)	23.5 (74.3)
Record low °C (°F)	22.0 (71.6)	22.0 (71.6)	22.0 (71.6)	22.0 (71.6)	21.5 (70.7)	21.0 (69.8)	21.0 (69.8)	20.5 (68.9)	21.0 (69.8)	21.0 (69.8)	22.0 (71.6)	22.0 (71.6)	20.5 (68.9)
Average precipitation mm (inches)	342 (13.5)	320 (12.6)	332 (13.1)	327 (12.9)	200 (7.9)	28 (1.1)	22 (0.9)	21 (0.8)	30 (1.2)	90 (3.5)	150 (5.9)	360 (14.2)	2,190 (86.2)
Average precipitation days (≥ days)	23	21	21	21	15	8	6	4	6	10	17	24	156
Source: WeatherAPI / Weather-and-Climate / Timeanddate / Weatherspark

== Government and politics ==
No.	Regent	Start of office	End of office	Vice regent
12	I Nyoman Sutjidra	26 February 2021	Incumbent	Gede Supriatna

The regent of Buleleng is the highest officeholder in the Buleleng Regency government. The Buleleng regent is responsible to the governor of Bali. Currently, the regent or regional head serving in Buleleng Regency is I Nyoman Sutjidra, accompanied by the vice regent Gede Supriatna. The position of regent and vice regent from the pair I Nyoman Sutjidra and Gede Supriatna is for the second term since 2024. For the second term, they won in the 2024 Buleleng regency election, and were inaugurated on 20 February 2025.

=== Parliament ===
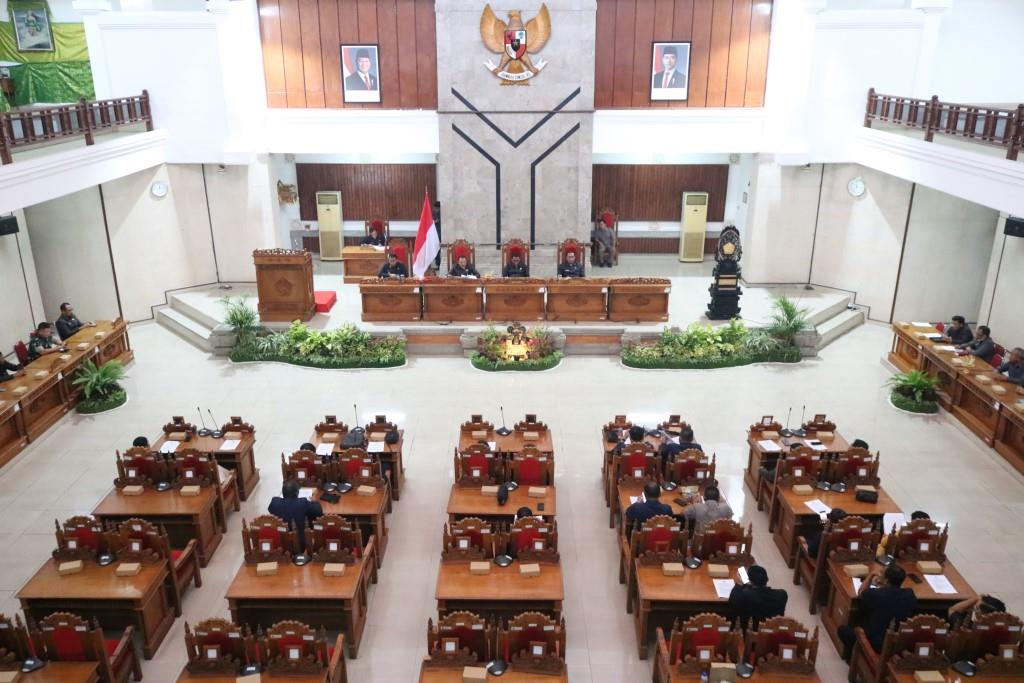
Buleleng's Parliament (DPRD) Chamber

=== Administrative districts ===
The regency is divided into nine districts (kecamatan), tabulated below with their areas and population totals from the 2010 census and the 2020 census, together with the official estimates as of mid 2025. The table also includes the number of administrative villages in each district (totaling 129 rural desa and 19 urban kelurahan), and its postal codes.

The administrative centres of each district have the same name as the district itself, except for the Buleleng District (of which the centre is Singaraja, which also serves as the administrative capital of the whole Regency) and Sawan District (of which the centre is Sangsit).

For convenience the table is divided into two geographical groups, a western group of four districts covering 61% of the land area but with just 41% of the population, and an eastern group of five districts with 39% of the land area and a faster-growing 59% of the population.

District code	Name of district (kecamatan)	Area in km^{2}	Pop'n census 2010	Pop'n census 2020	Pop'n estimate mid 2025	No. of villages	Post codes
51.08.01	Gerokgak ^{(a)}	405.75	78,825	97,552	103,779	14	81155
51.08.02	Seririt	123.09	69,572	93,412	95,239	21 ^{(b)}	81153
51.08.03	Busungbiu	140.64	39,719	52,690	52,920	15	81154
51.08.04	Banjar	137.84	68,960	86,205	88,307	17	81152
sub-totals	Western group	807.32	257,076	329,859	340,245	67	
51.08.05	Sukasada	160.94	72,050	89,774	95,982	15 ^{(c)}	81161
51.08.06	Buleleng	46.24	128,899	150,211	156,261	29 ^{(d)}	81111 -81119
51.08.07	Sawan	91.28	58,578	80,174	86,203	14	81171
51.08.08	Kubutambahan	118.45	53,765	68,778	74,965	13	81172
51.08.09	Tejakula	98.33	53,757	73,017	78,643	10	81173
sub-totals	Eastern group	515.23	367,049	461,954	482,054	81	
	Totals	1,322.55	624,125	791,813	832,299	148	

Note: (a) Gerokgak District includes the offshore island of Pulau Menjangan Kecil. (b) includes the kelurahan of Seririt, plus 20 desa.
(c) includes the kelurahan of Sukasada, plus 14 desa. (d) comprises 17 kelurahan and 12 desa.

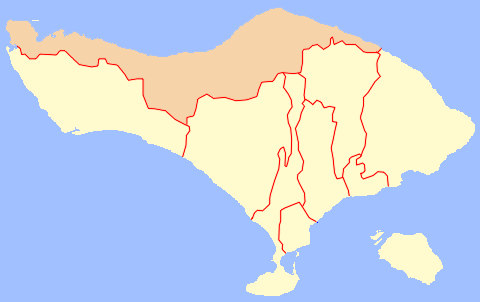
Map of Buleleng Regency in Bali

Map of districts in Buleleng Regency

List of districts and villages in Buleleng Regency as follows:

Code	Districts	Urban villages	Rural villages	Status	List
51.08.04	Banjar	-	17	Desa	Banjar; Banjar Tegeha; Banyuatis; Banyuseri; Cempaga; Dencarik; Gesing; Gobleg; Kaliasem; Kayuputih; Munduk; Pedawa; Sidetapa; Tampekan; Temukus; Tigawasa; Tirtasari
51.08.06	Buleleng	17	12	Desa	Alasangker; Anturan; Bakti Seraga; Jinengdalem; Kalibukbuk; Nagasepaha; Pemaron; Penglatan; Petandakan; Poh Bergong; Sari Mekar; Tukadmungga
51.08.06	Buleleng	17	12	Kelurahan	Astina; Banjar Bali; Banjar Jawa; Banjar Tegal; Banyuasri; Banyuning; Beratan; Kaliuntu; Kampung Anyar; Kampung Baru; Kampung Bugis; Kampung Kajanan; Kampung Singaraja; Kendran; Liligundi; Paket Agung; Penarukan
51.08.03	Busung Biu	-	15	Desa	Bengkel; Bongancina; Busung Biu; Kedis; Kekeran; Pelapuan; Pucaksari; Sepang; Sepang Kelod; Subuk; Telaga; Tinggarsari; Tista; Titab; Umejero
51.08.01	Gerokgak	-	14	Desa	Banyupoh; Celukanbawang; Gerokgak; Musi; Patas; Pejarakan; Pemuteran; Pengulon; Penyabangan; Sanggalangit; Sumberklampok; Sumberkima; Tinga-Tinga; Tukadsumaga
51.08.08	Kubutambahan	-	13	Desa	Bengkala; Bila; Bontihing; Bukti; Bulian; Depeha; Kubutambahan; Mengening; Pakisan; Tajun; Tambakan; Tamblang; Tunjung
51.08.07	Sawan	-	14	Desa	Bebetin; Bungkulan; Galungan; Giri Emas; Jagaraga; Kerobokan; Lemukih; Menyali; Sangsit; Sawan; Sekumpul; Sinabun; Sudaji; Suwug
51.08.02	Seririt	1	20	Desa	Banjar Asem; Bestala; Bubunan; Gunungsari; Joanyar; Kalianget; Kalisada; Lokapaksa; Mayong; Munduk Bestala; Pangkung Paruk; Patemon; Pengastulan; Rangdu; Ringdikit; Sulanyah; Tangguwisia; Ularan; Umeanyar; Unggahan
51.08.02	Seririt	1	20	Kelurahan	Seririt
51.08.05	Sukasada	1	14	Desa	Ambengan; Git Git; Kayu Putih; Padang Bulia; Pancasari; Panji; Panji Anom; Pegadungan; Pegayaman; Sambangan; Selat; Silangjana; Tegal Linggah; Wanagiri
51.08.05	Sukasada	1	14	Kelurahan	Sukasada
51.08.09	Tejakula	-	10	Desa	Bondalem; Julah; Les; Madenan; Pacung; Penuktukan; Sambirenteng; Sembiran; Tejakula; Tembok
	TOTAL	19	129		

Districts in Buleleng regency (west to east)

Gerokgak district

Seririt district

Busung Biu district

Banjar district

Sukasada district
Buleleng district

Sawan district

Kubutambahan district

Tejakula district

== Demographics ==
=== Ethnicities ===
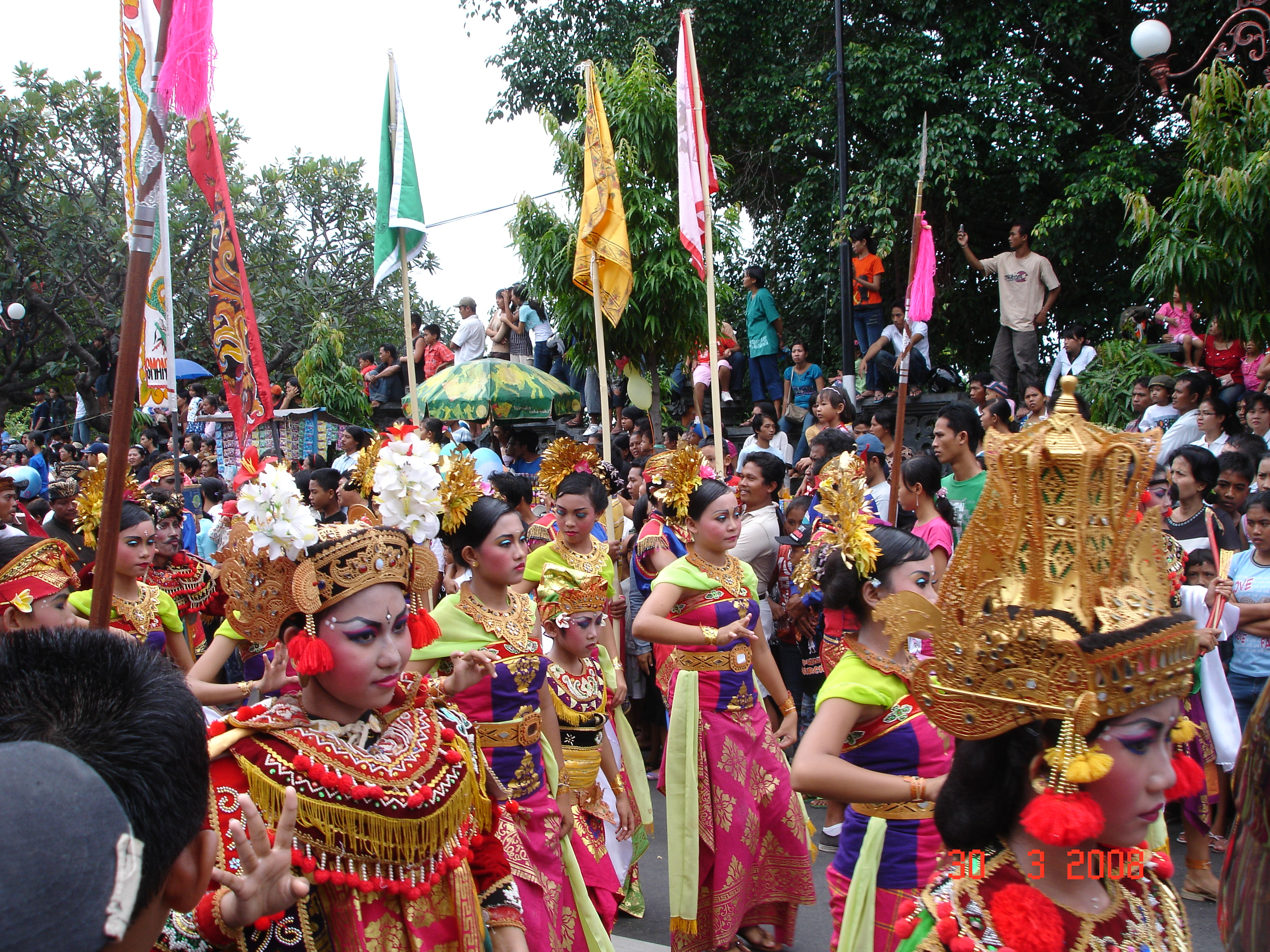
A festival in Singaraja

Most of the ethnic groups in Buleleng are Balinese. Based on data from the Central Bureau of Statistics in the Indonesian Population Census 2010, as many as 575,905 people or 92.27% of the 624,125 people of Buleleng Regency are of the Balinese ethnic group. Following this, the Javanese ethnicity is up to 2.41% of the population. Other ethnic groups are also present such as the Bali Aga, Madurese, Bugis, and several others. In Singaraja, there is a Bugis village, where the majority of the residents are Bugis and majority are Hindus.

The following is the population of Buleleng Regency based on ethnicity in 2010:

No.	Ethnic groups	Pop. (2010)	Pct .(%)
1	Balinese	575,905	92.27%
2	Javanese	15,072	2.41%
3	Bali Aga	11,438	1.83%
4	Madurese	10,722	1.72%
5	Bugis	2,075	0.33%
6	Chinese	1,374	0.22%
7	Sasak	1,353	0.22%
8	Sundanese	880	0.14%
9	Malays	417	0.07%
10	Flores	142	0.02%
11	Others	4,747	0.76%
	Buleleng Regency	624.125	100%

=== Religion ===
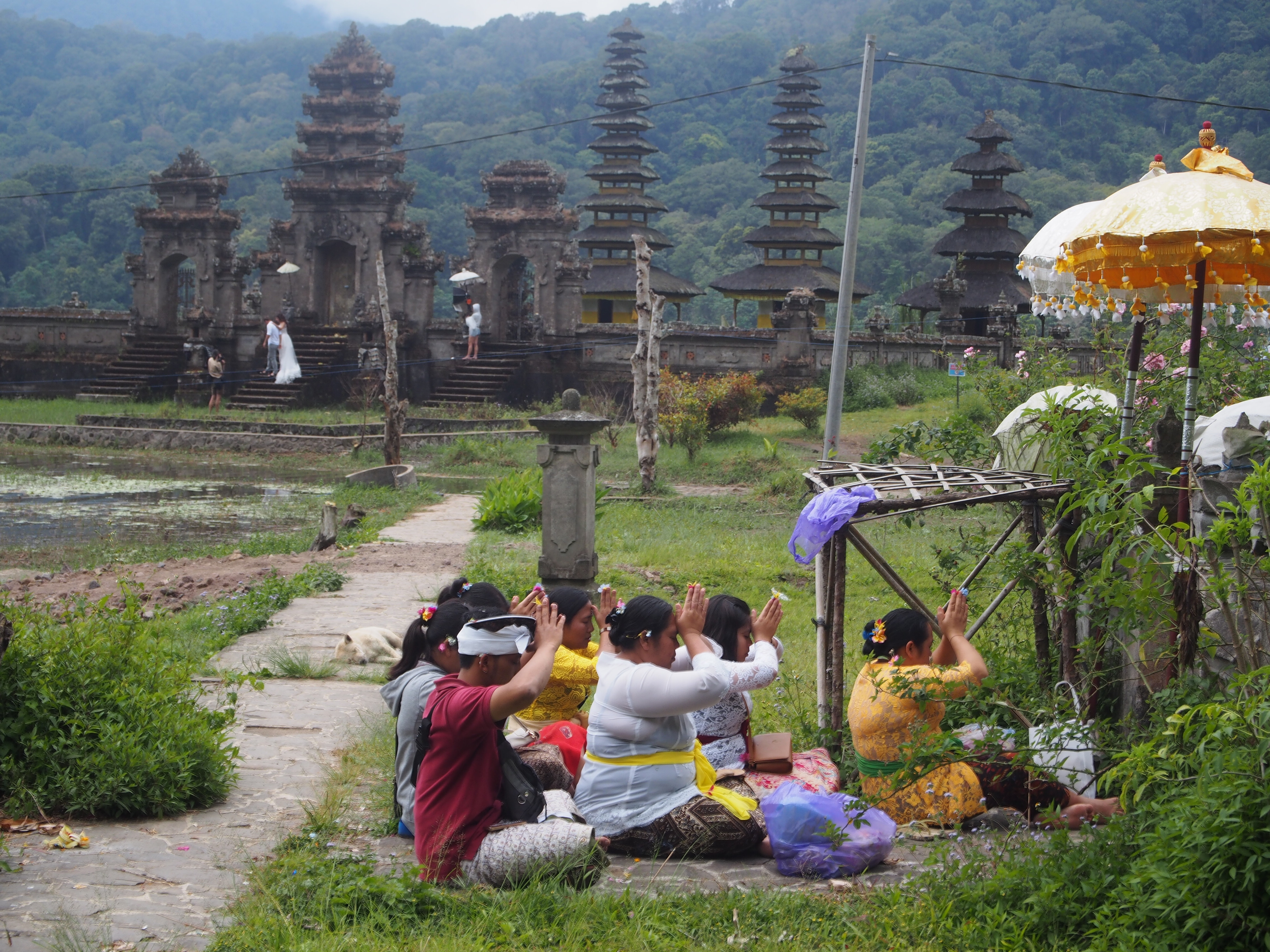
Prayer Hinduism at Pura Tamblingan

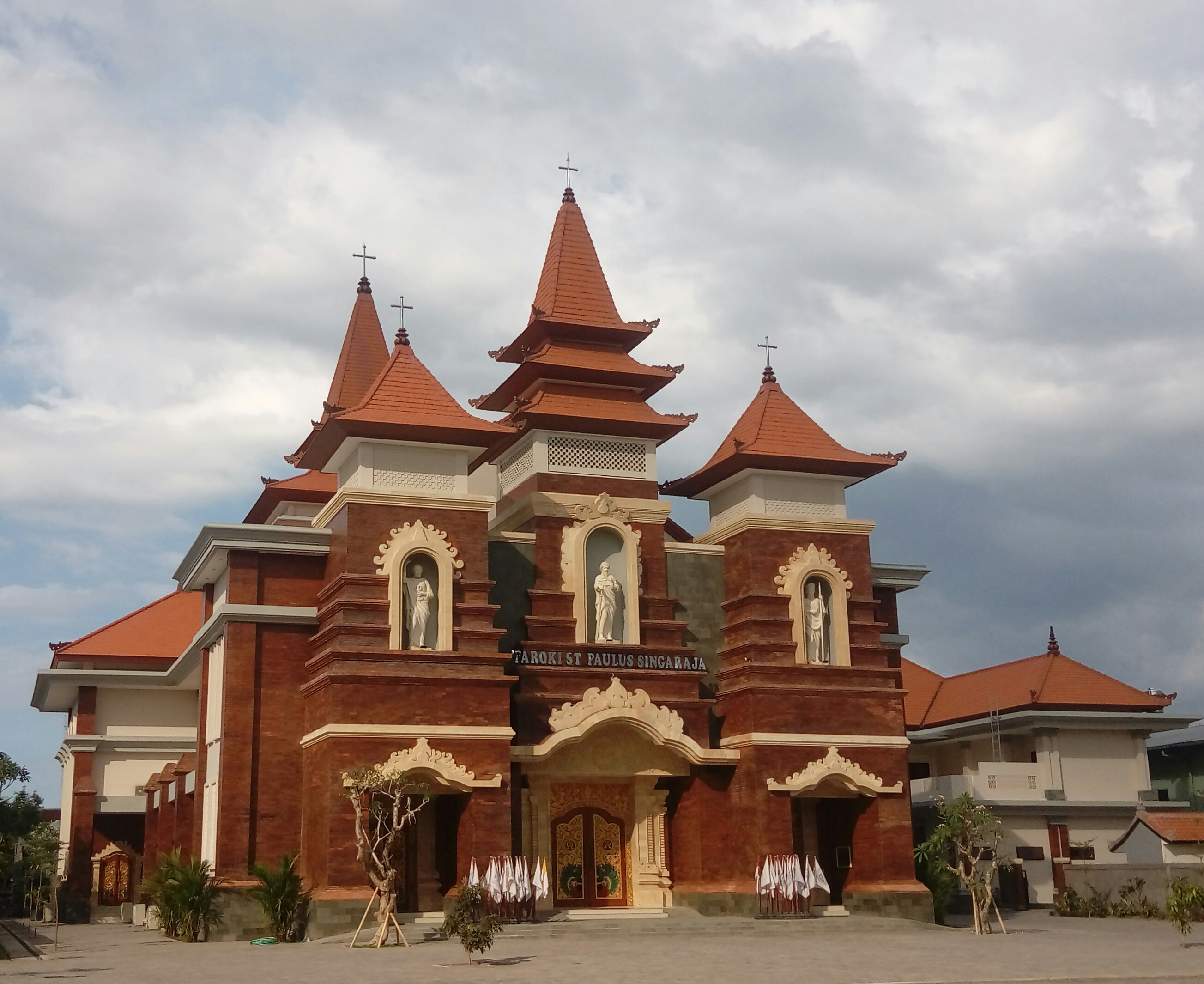
Santo Paulus church, Singaraja

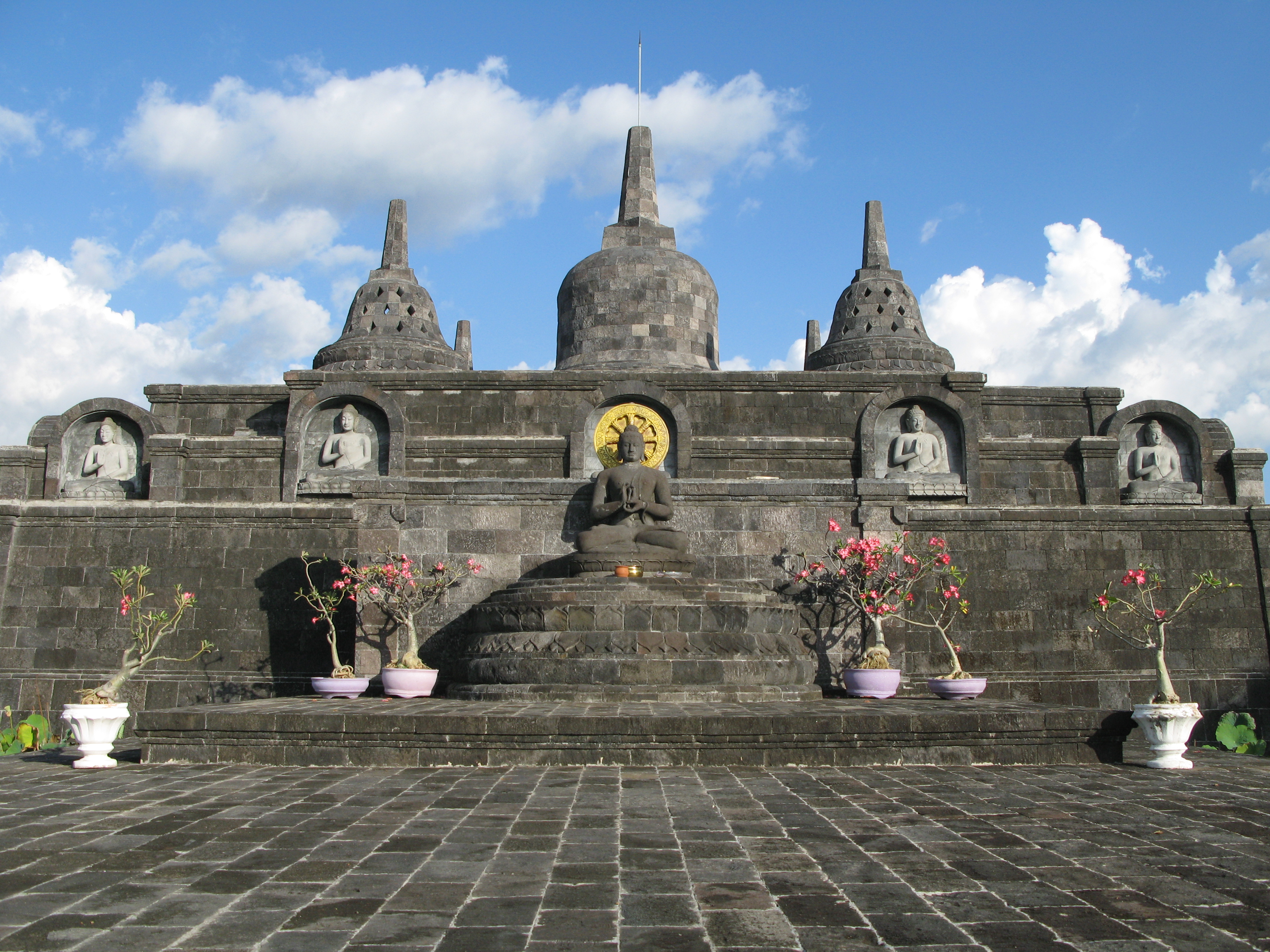
Brahmavihara Arama, Buddhist Temple in Banjar, Buleleng.

Religious data in Buleleng Regency in 2024
Religion	Population	Percent	Number of places of worship (2023)
Islam	77,142	9.3%	73 mosques and 134 prayer rooms
Hinduism	737,503	89.3%	9 Dang Kahyangan temples and 507 Kahyangan Tiga temples
Christianity (Protestant)	5,522	0.7%	66 churches
Christianity (Catholic)	1,705	0.2%	1 parish church and 2 chapels
Buddhist	4,216	0.5%	13 temples and 2 cetya
Confucian	79	0.009%	–
Others	26	0.003%	–
Total	826,193	100%	

== Airports ==
Lt.Col. Wisnu Airfield is located in the Sumberkima village.

Research on a new airport was completed in 2017, due to the congestion of Ngurah Rai International Airport. The new two-runway airport will be built in the east part of Buleleng Regency and will be connected by railway to the existing airport. Kubutambahan, 15 kilometers east of Singaraja, was decided to be the new airport site over two other candidates, Sangsit and Gerokgak, after taking into account geographical conditions, wind speed, wind direction, and other factors.

== Pearl producers ==
Many big pearl producers have developed 130.9 hectares in Gerokgak village as an area for pearl breeding and world-class pearl production. It will enlarge to 250 hectares swath of water stretching from Gerokgak to Kubutambahan.

== Education ==
Buleleng is famous for its nickname: "the City of Education." At the beginning of the 1980s, the Faculty of Teacher Training (FKG) was established which is one of the faculties of Udayana University. In 1985, it changed to STKIP Singaraja and separated from Udayana University. This caused the dim development of Singaraja as a city of education. After a long journey, STKIP changed to IKIP Singaraja and until now it is known as Ganesha University of Education which is in Singaraja City.

== Tourism ==
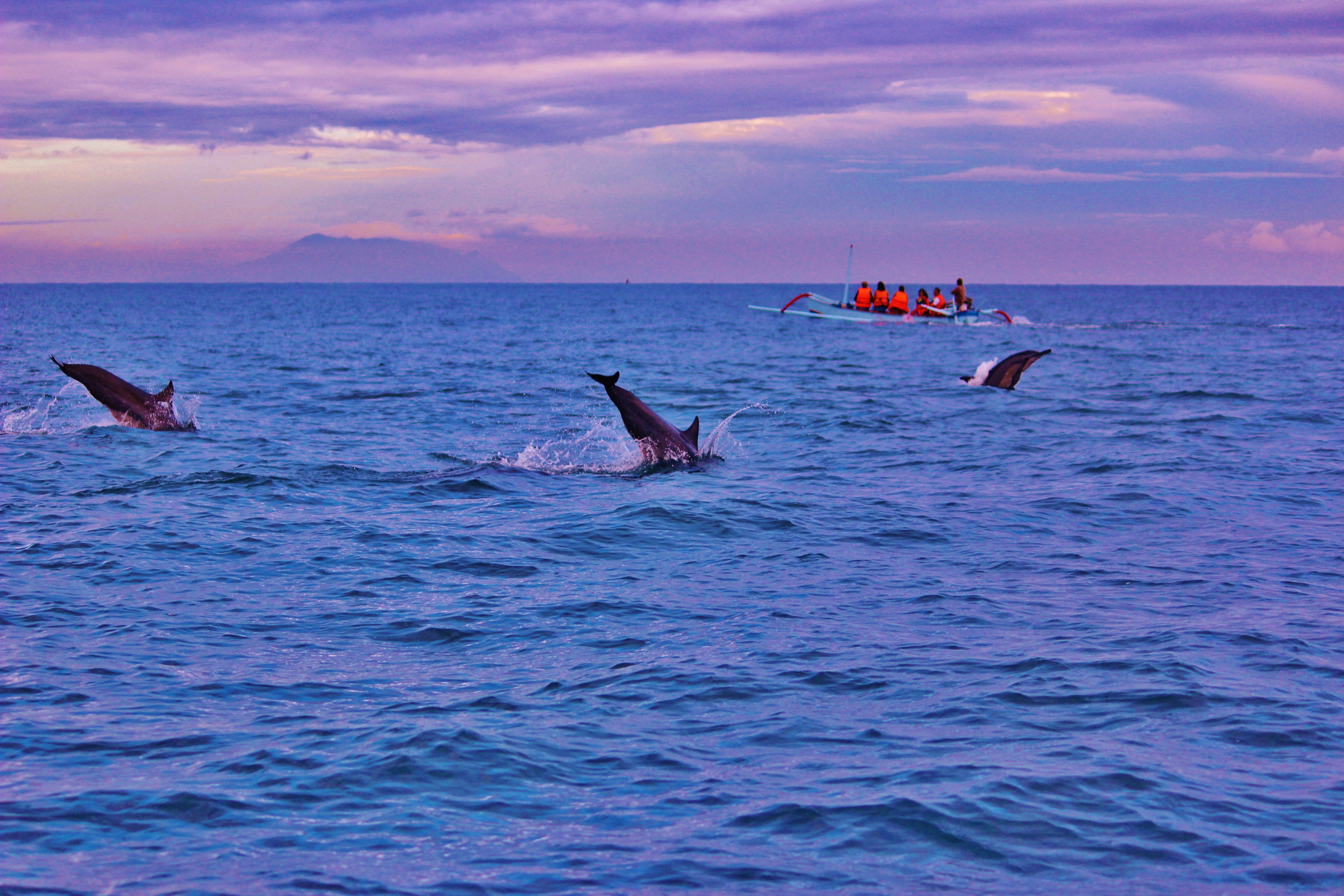
Dolphins in Lovina Beach, Singaraja

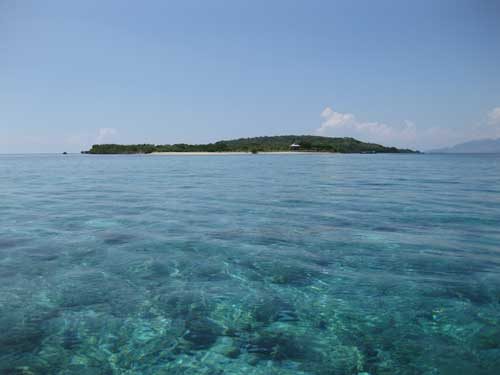
Menjangan Island

Tourism is the main economic support for Buleleng Regency.

Some of the tourist attractions in Buleleng Regency include:

- Sanih Water
- Gitgit Waterfall
- Sing Sing Waterfall
- Lekr Buyan
- Lake Tamblingan
- Gedong Kirtya (palm leaf library)
- Lovina Beach
- Jagaraga
- Beji Sangsit Temple
- Dalem Sangsit Temple
- Spiritual tourism at Tirta Sudhamala Temple, Taman Alit Temple and Patirtaan Lingga Pawitra Temple in Banyuasri Traditional Village
- Desa Sawan (where Gamelan musical instruments are made).
- Batu Bolong Temple
- Meduwe Karang Temple
- Ponjok Batu
- Sembiran
- Buyan Lake and Tamblingan Lake
- Beratan Village (where gold and silver jewelry is produced).
- Banyuning Village (famous for its clay craft)
- Dutch Cemetery
- The largest Ganesha statue in Southeast Asia
- Banjar hot springs and temples in Banjar Village
- Pulaki Temple
- Melanting Temple
- Gitgit Twin Waterfalls
- Jayaprana Cemetery
- Celukterima Temple
- Menjangan Island
- Mayong Village
- Bulian Village
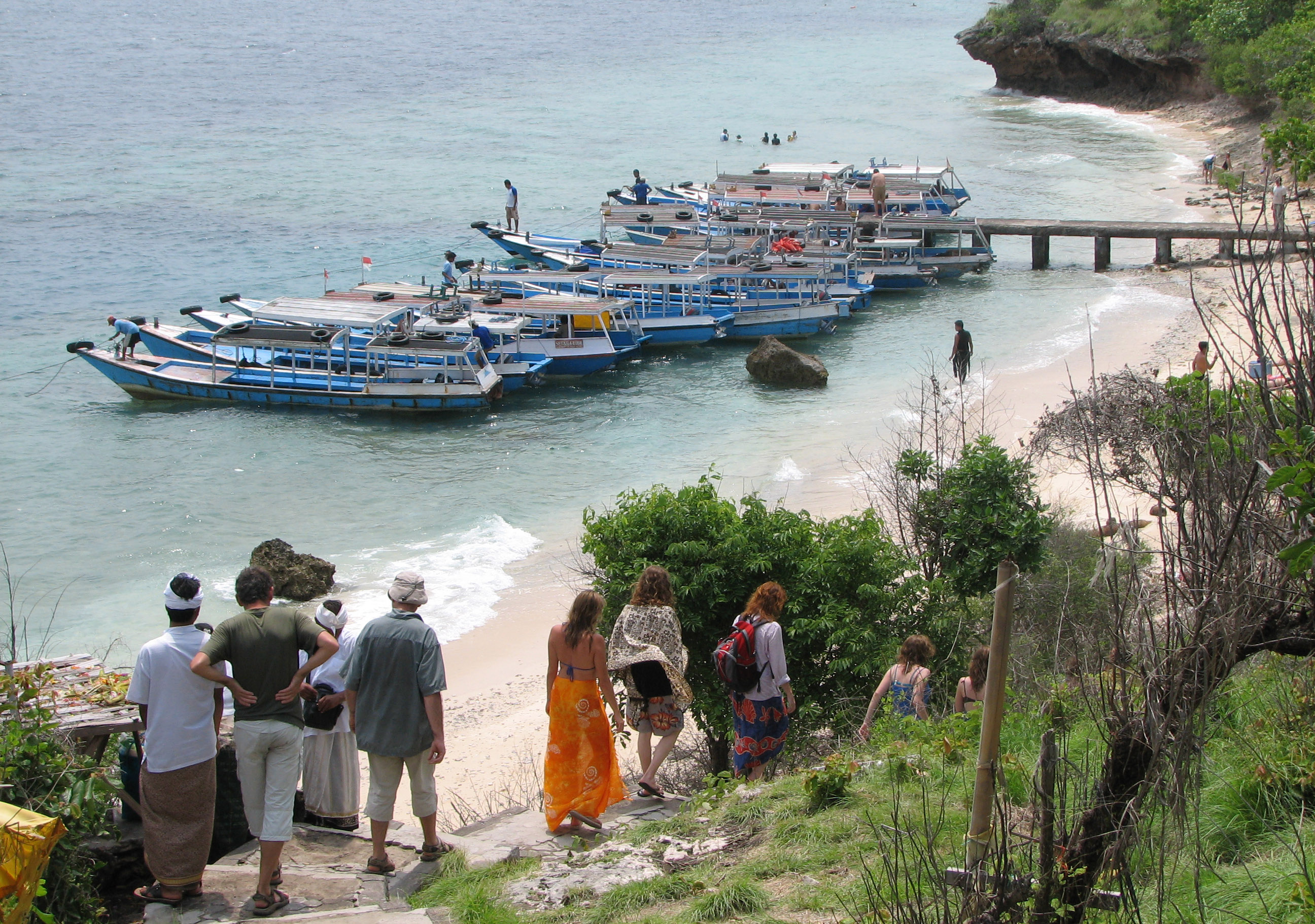
Tourists in Menjangan Island

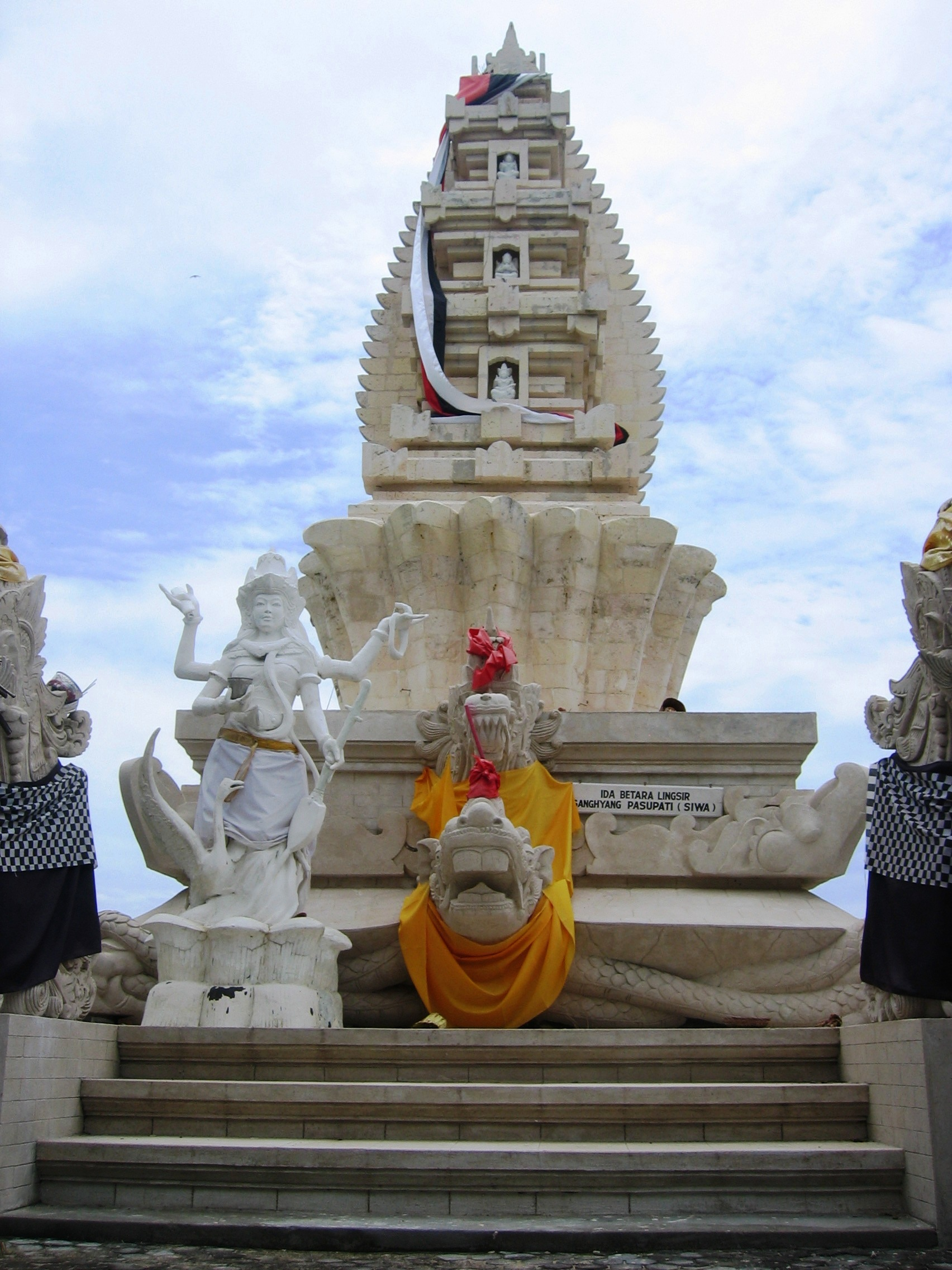
Pura Taman Kelenting Sari.

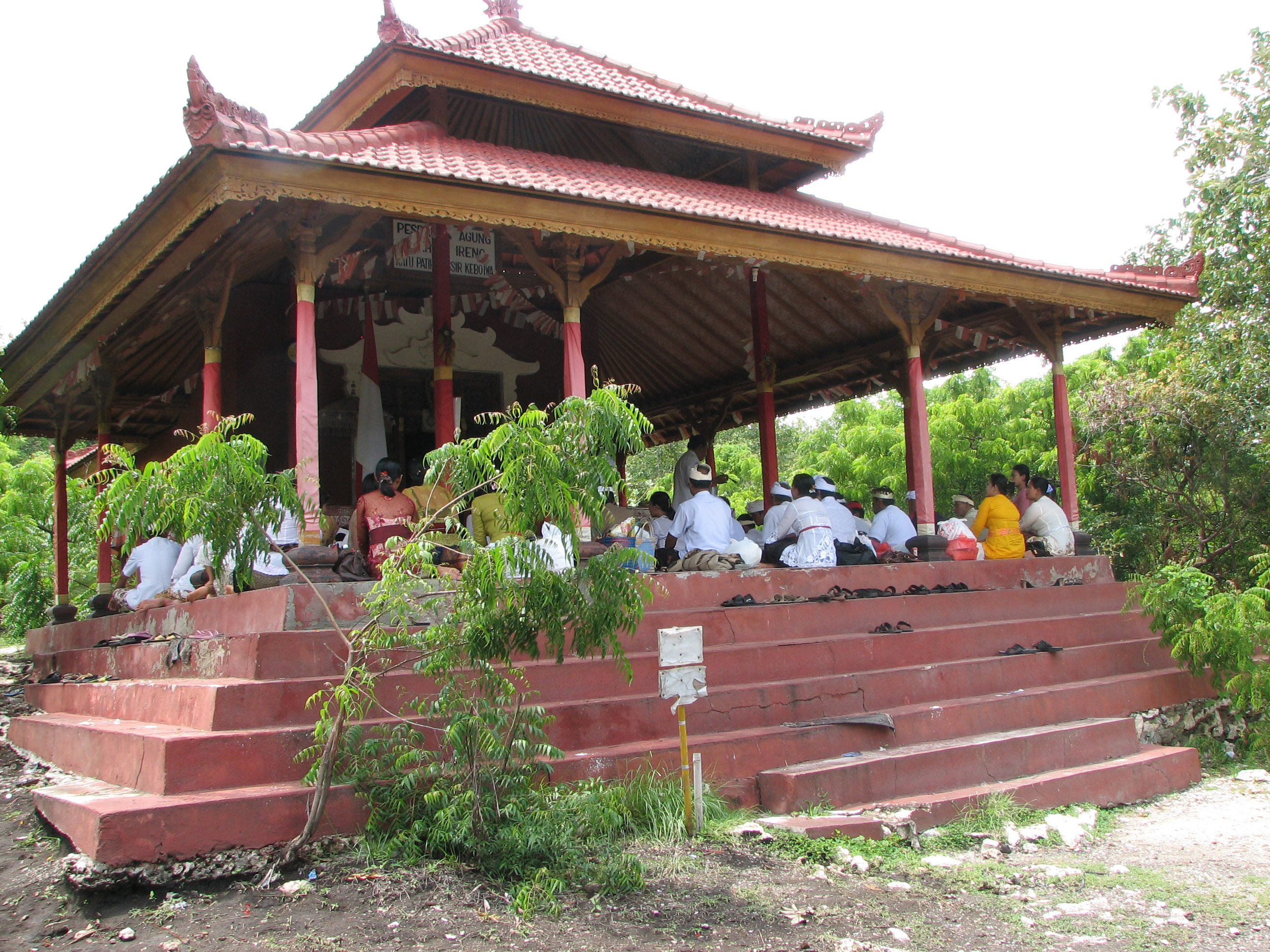
A temple where the Patih Kebo Iwa is honored.

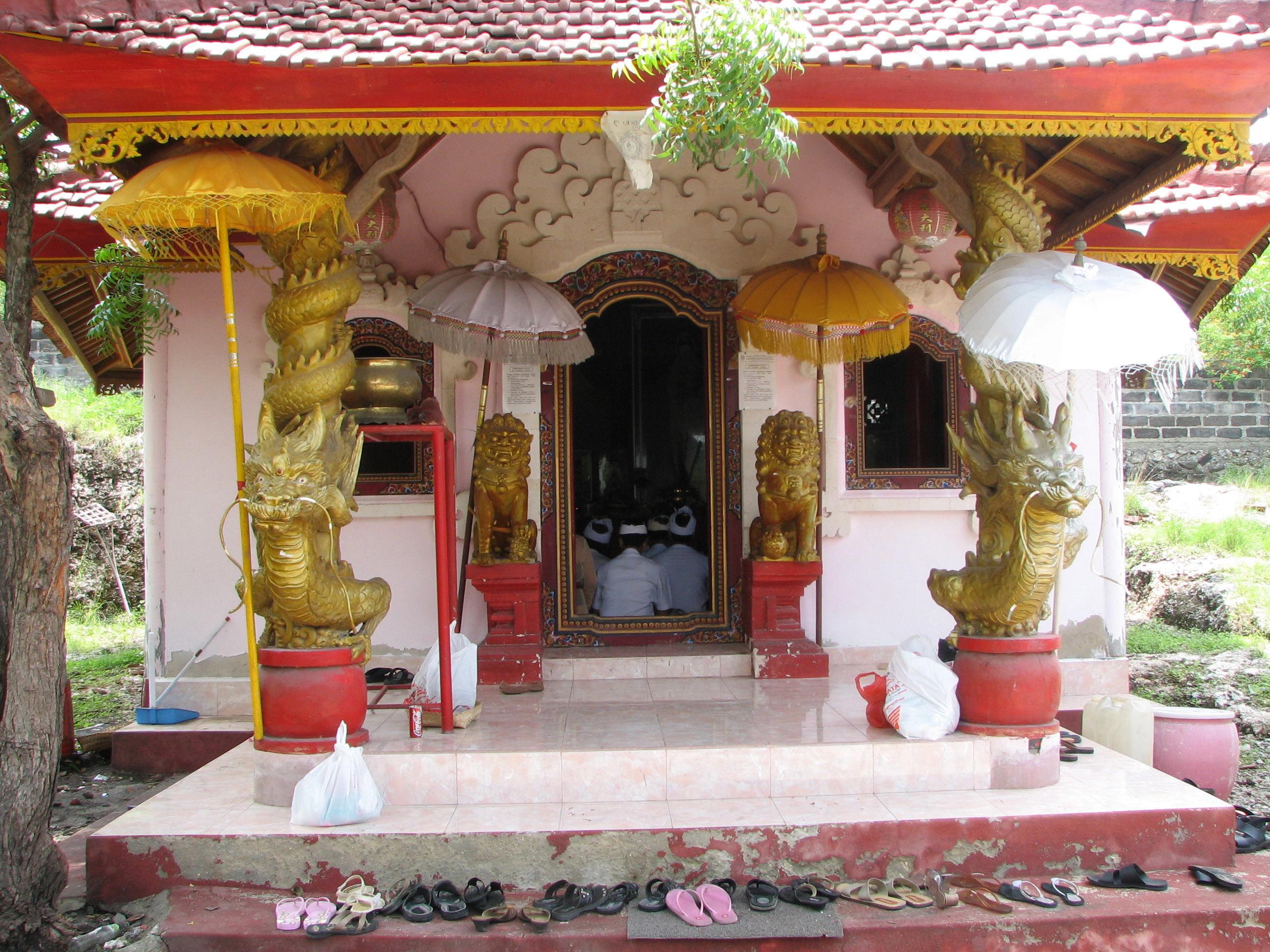
Temple where Goddess Kwan Im is worshiped.

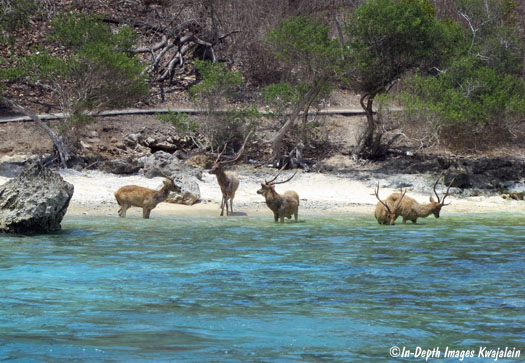
Deer in Menjangan Island.

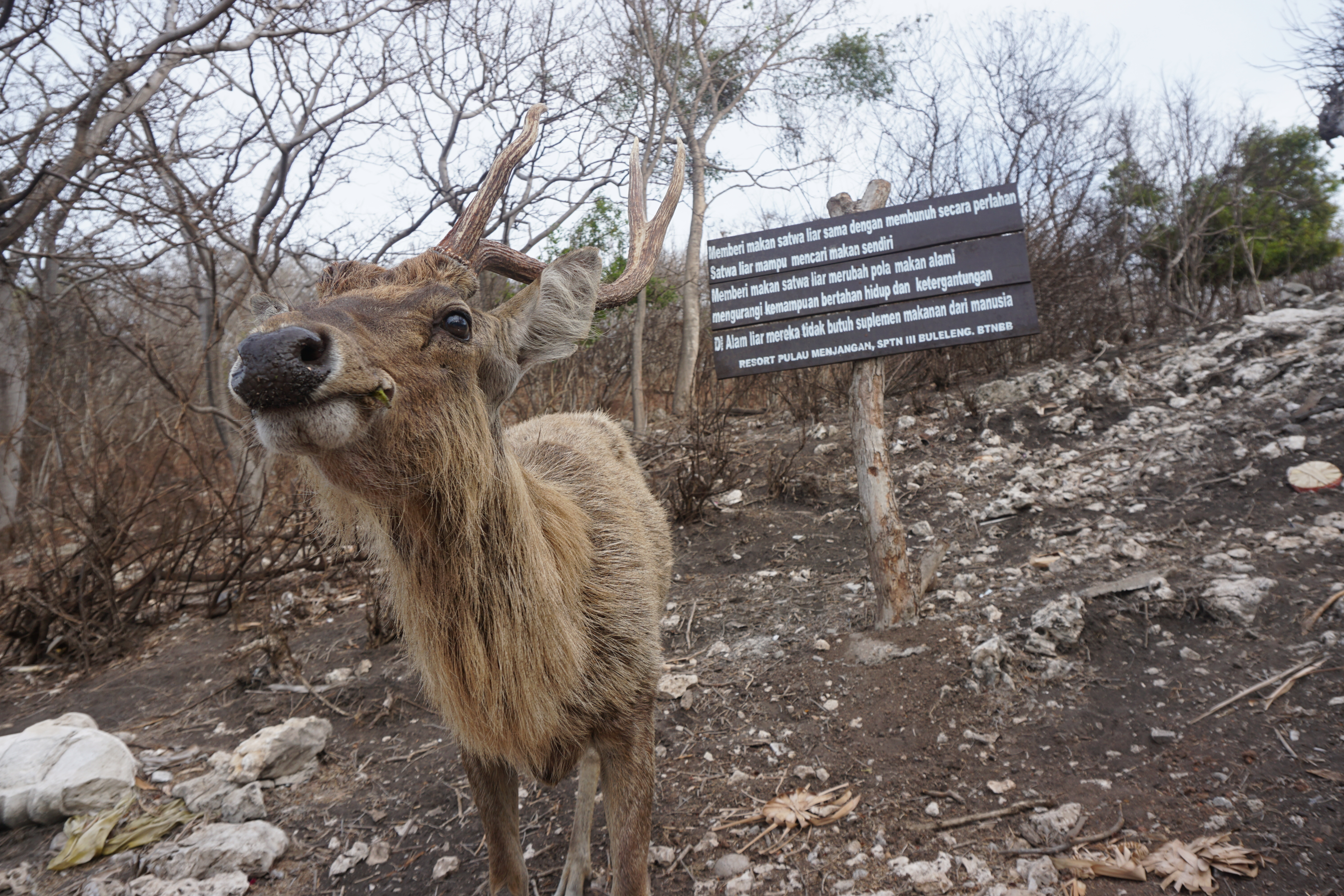
A deer in Menjangan Island.

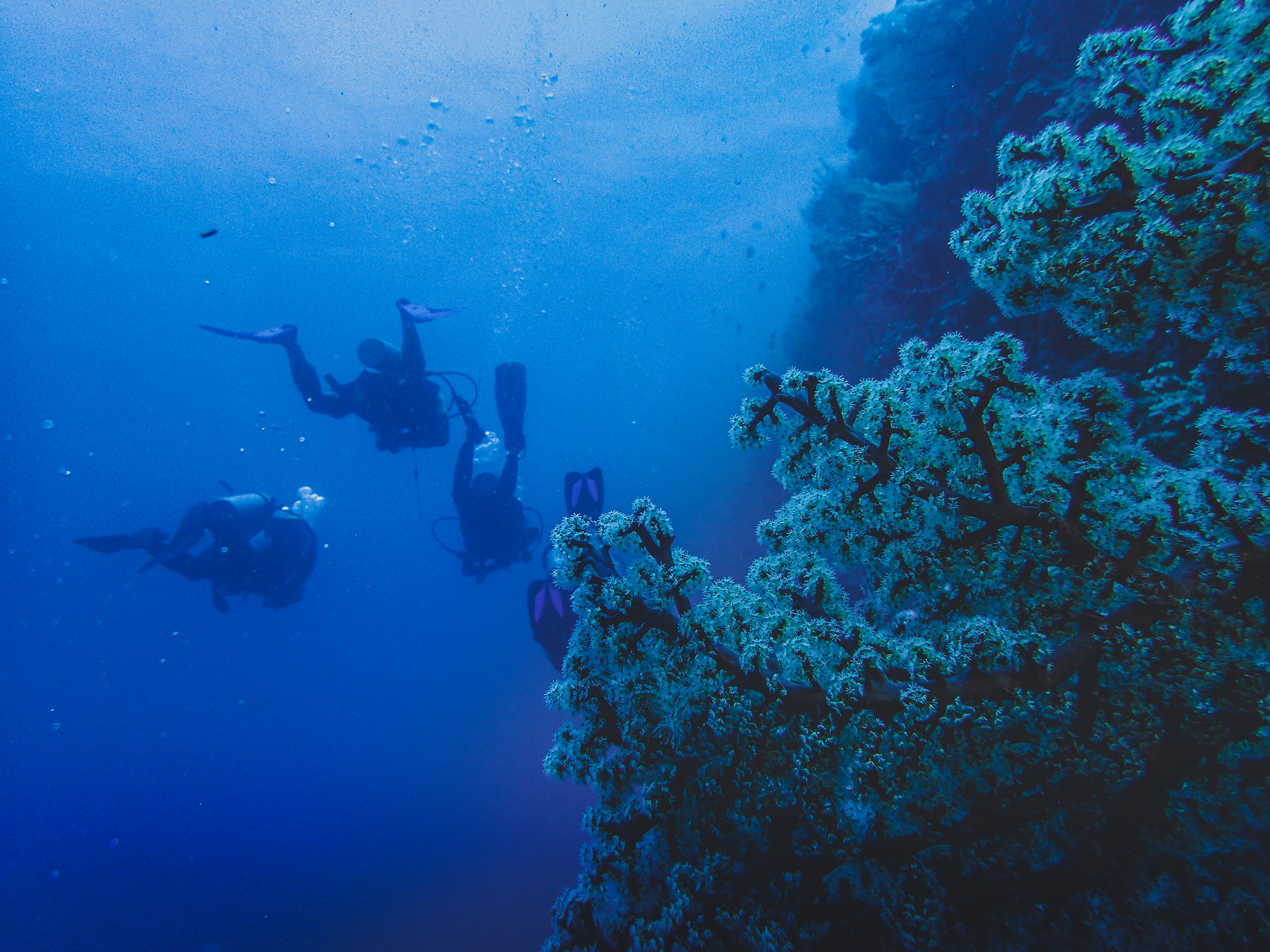
Diving activities in Menjangan Island.

== Gallery ==
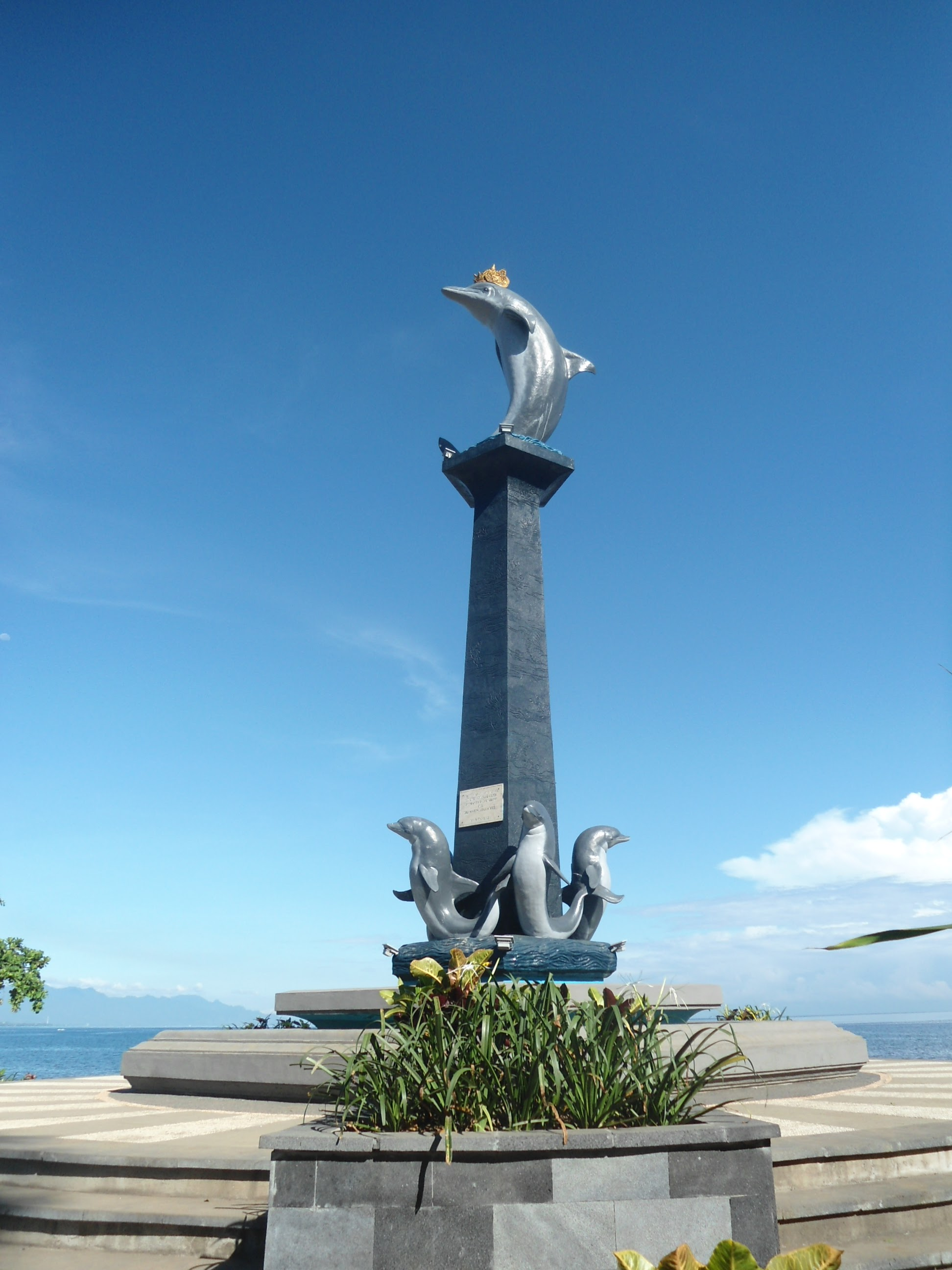
Dolphin Statue, Kalibukbuk

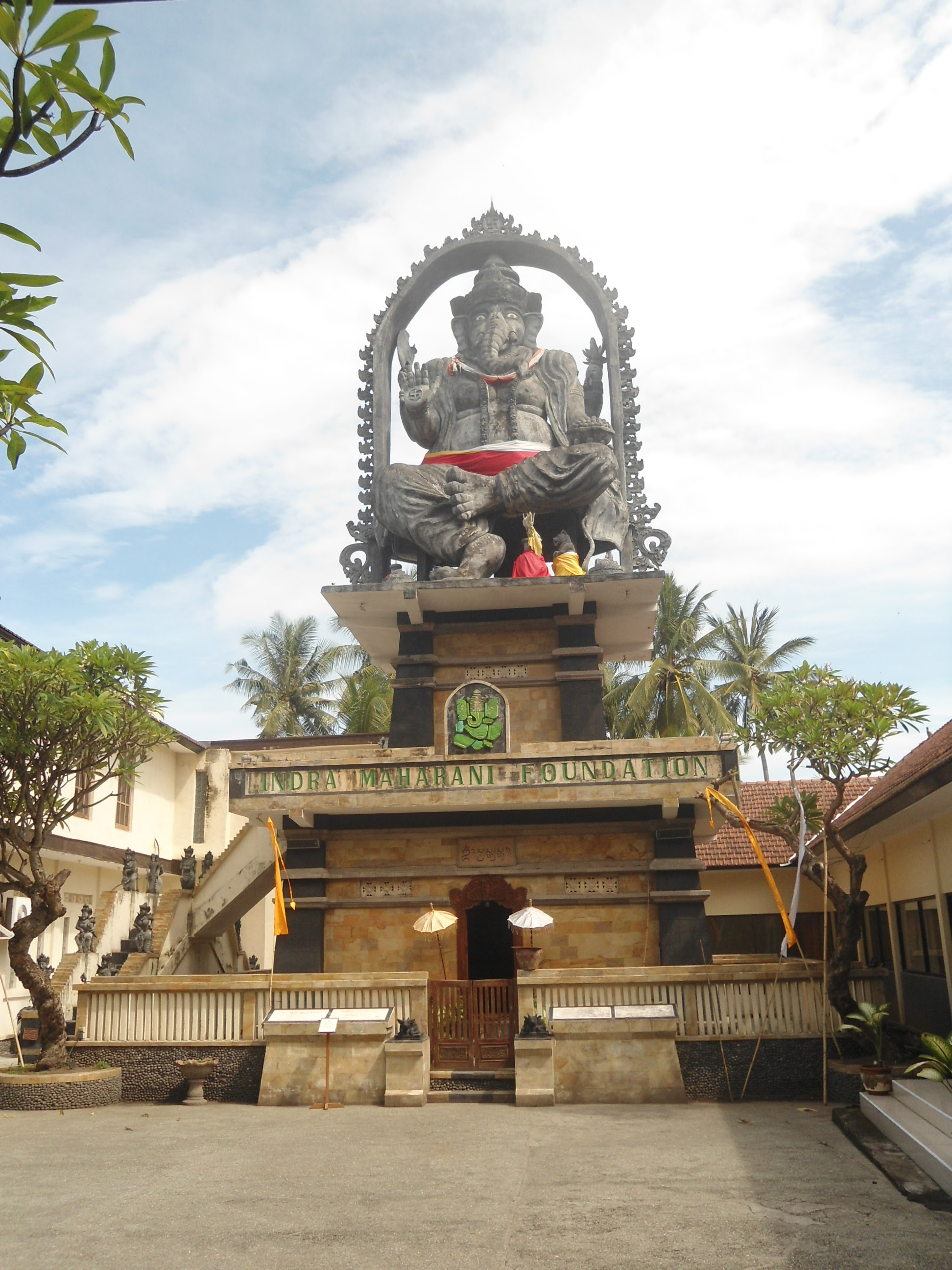
Sri Maha Ganesha Statue, Kalibukbuk

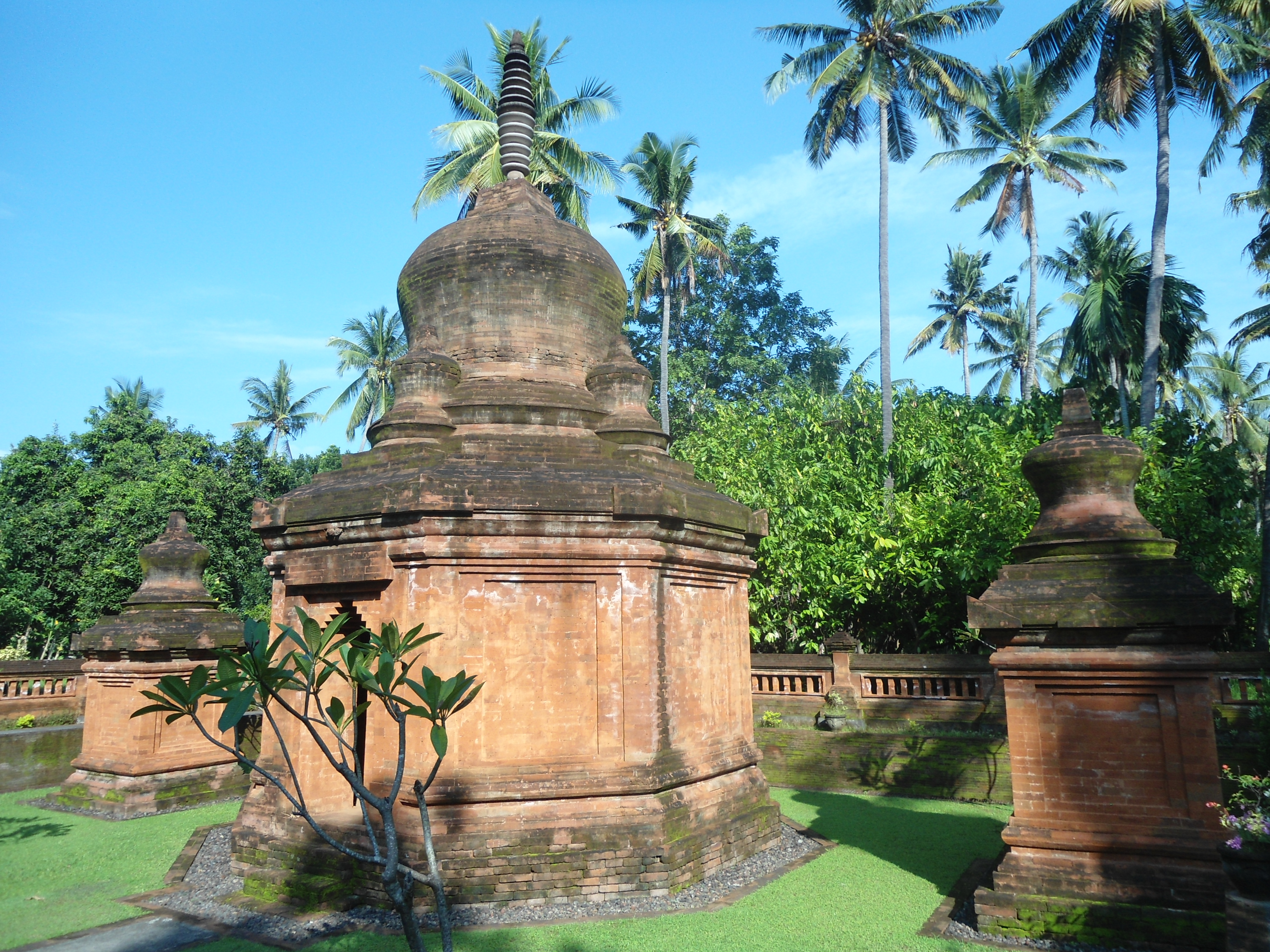
Candi Stupa Kalibukbuk

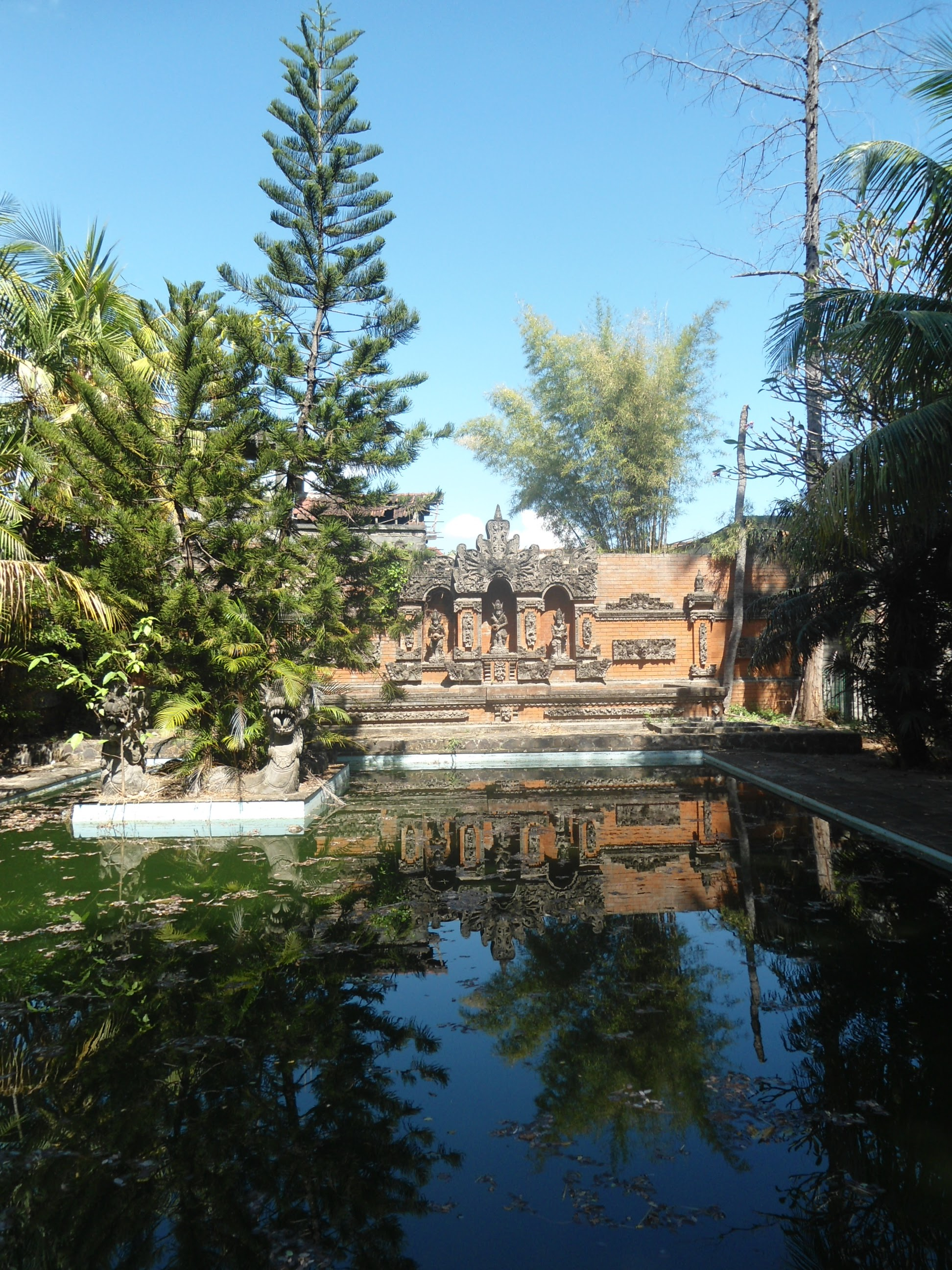
Kaliasem Palace

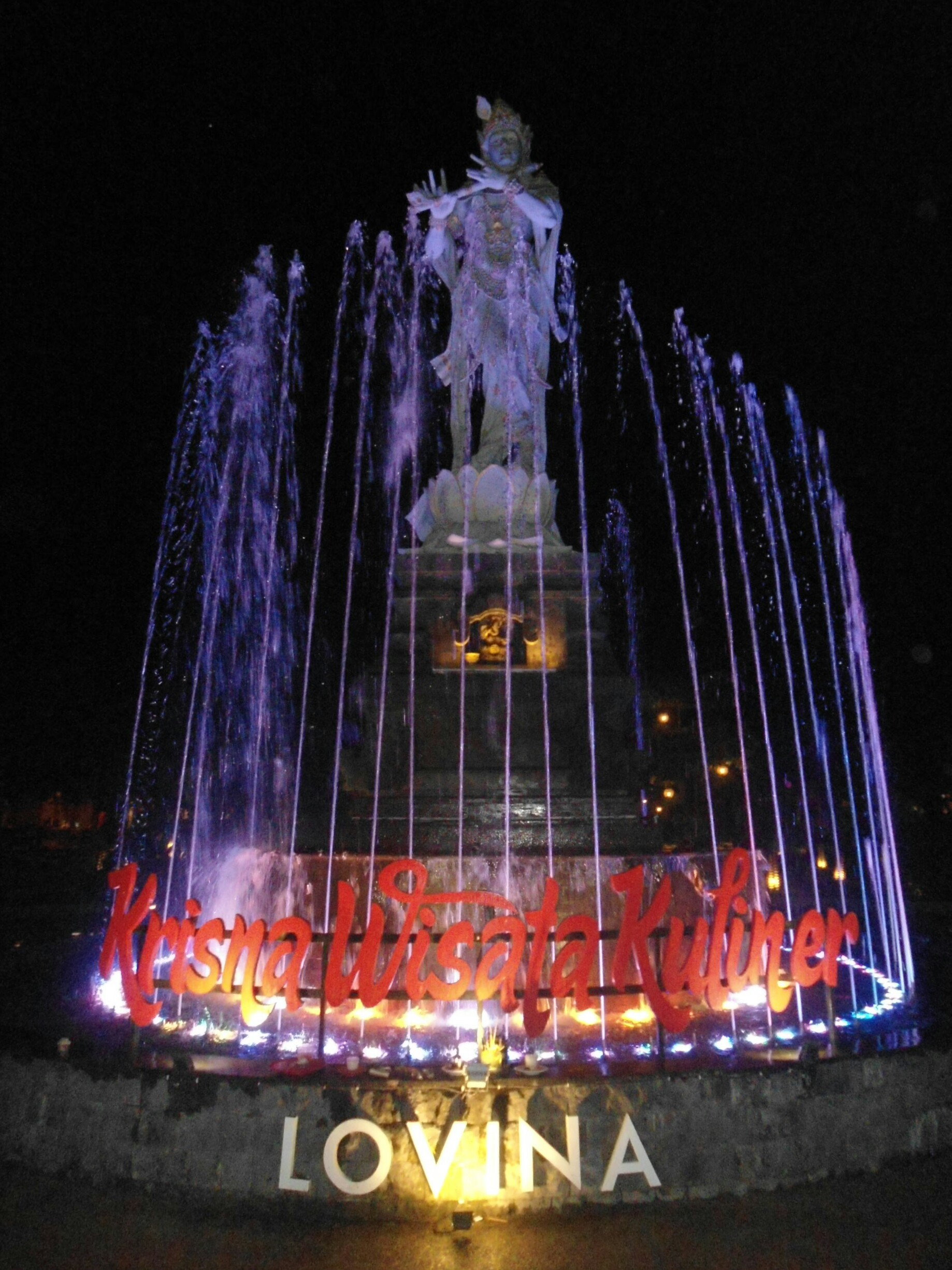
Krisna Statue, Temukus

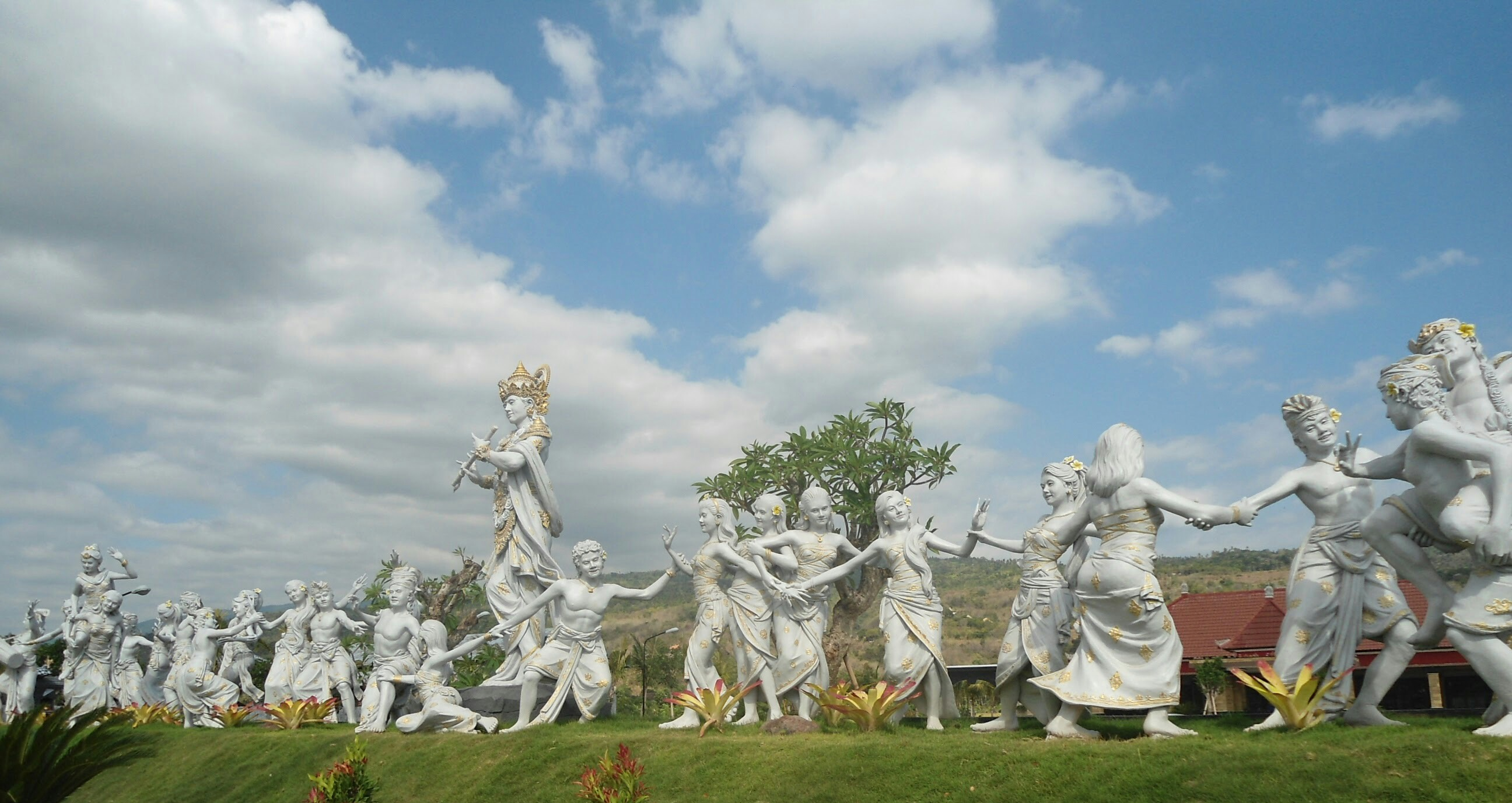
Krisna Lila Statue, Temukus

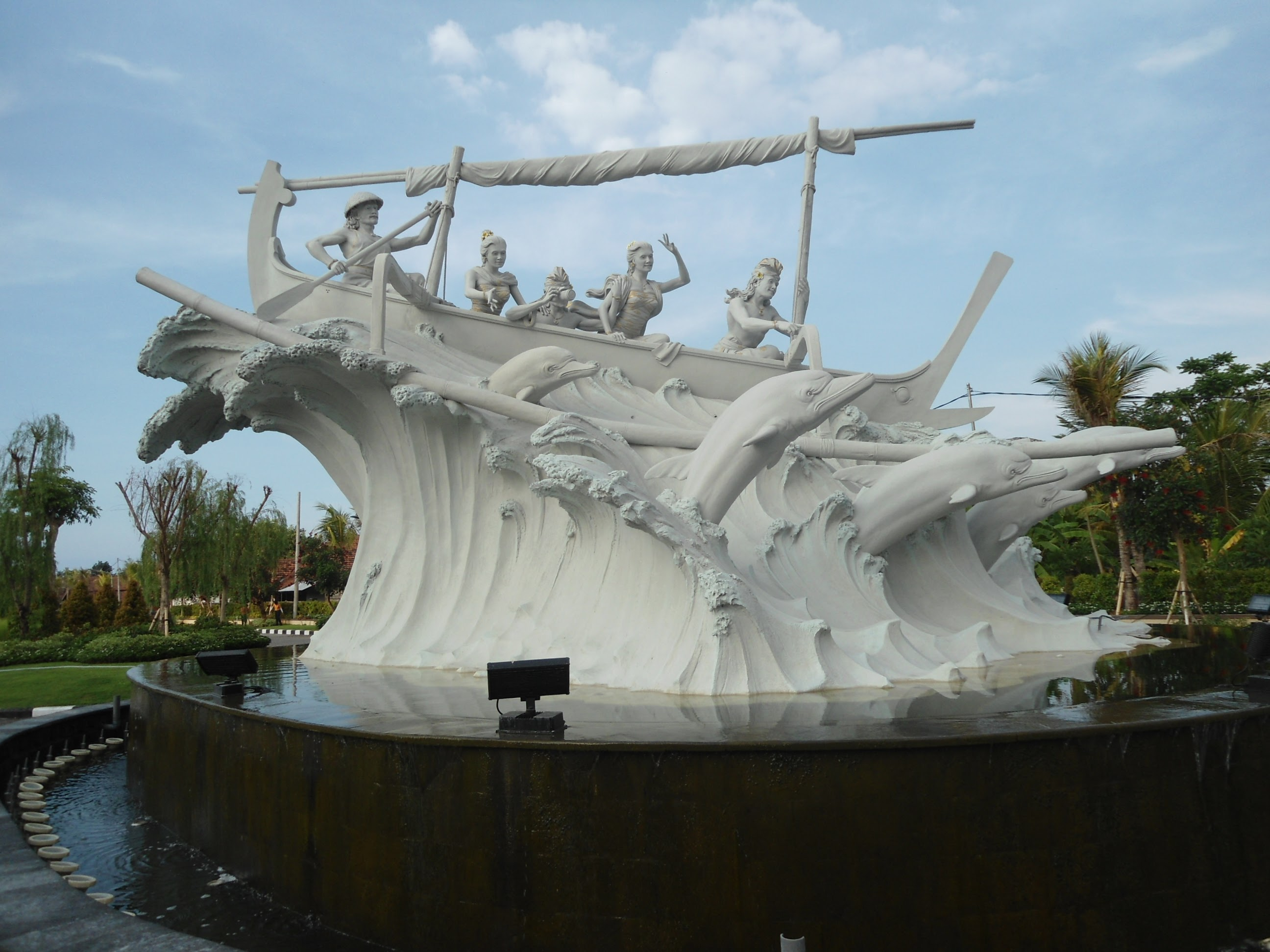
Dolphin Tour Statue, Temukus

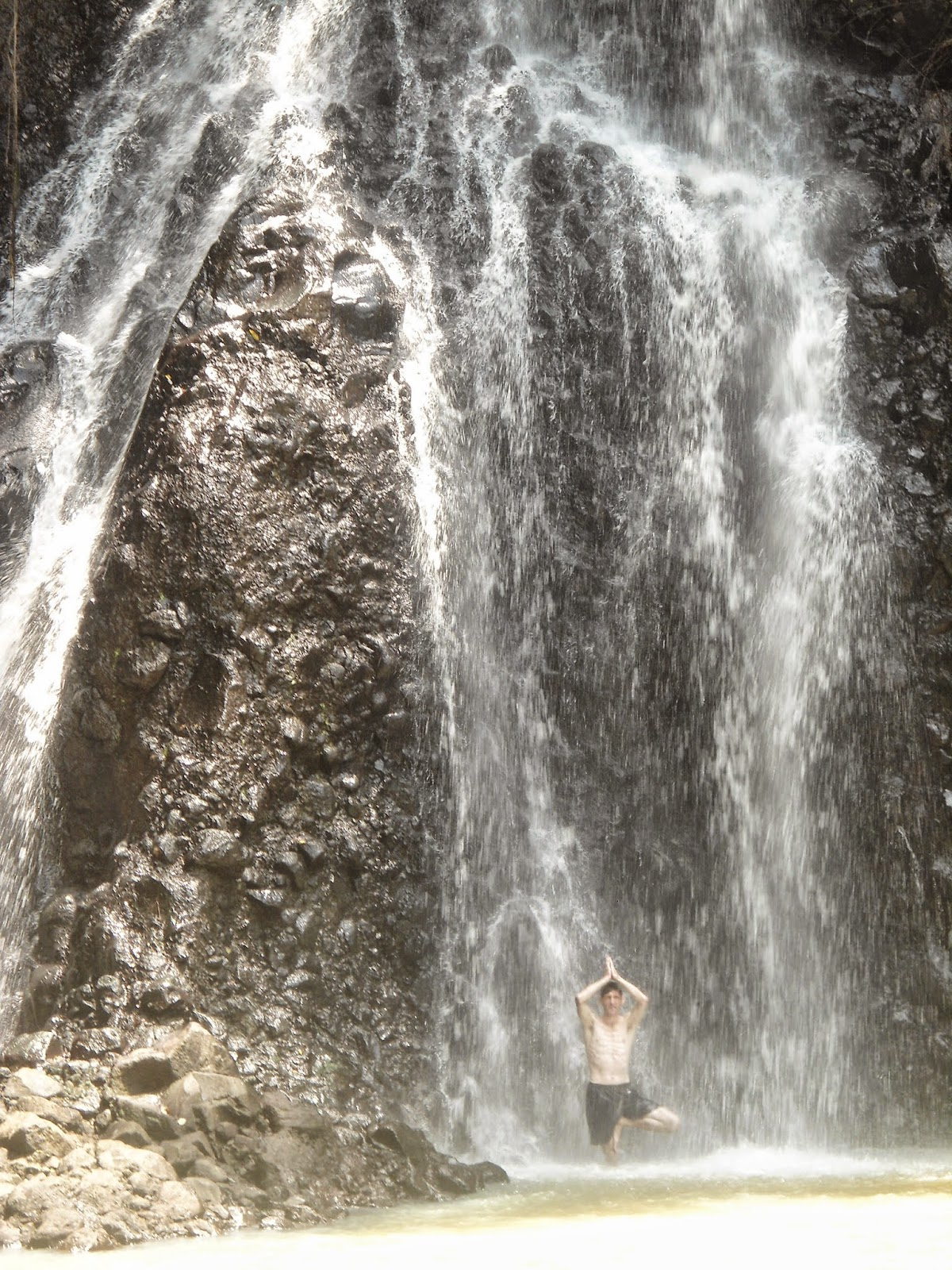
Sing Sing Waterfall, Temukus
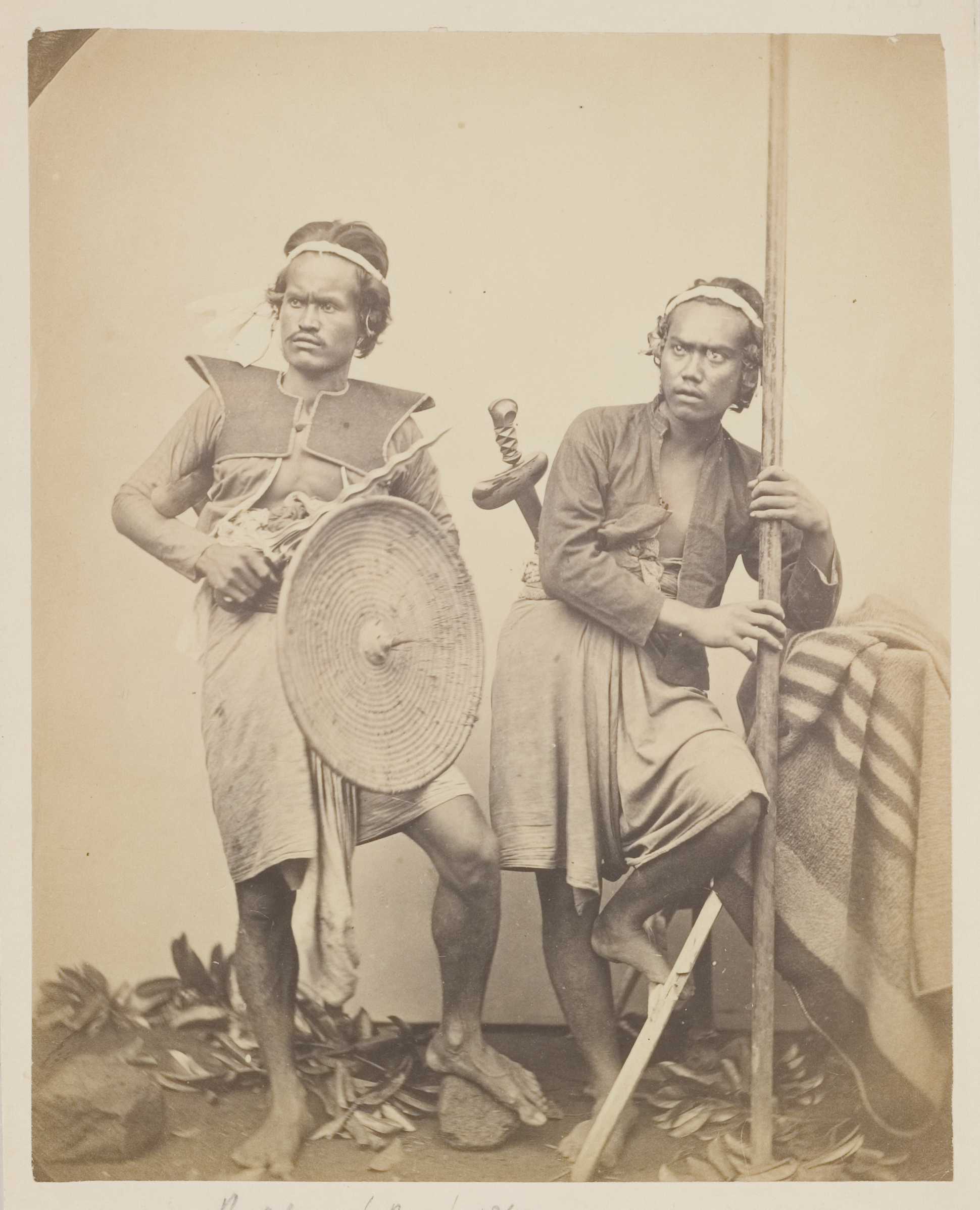
Two warriors in Buleleng, 1865

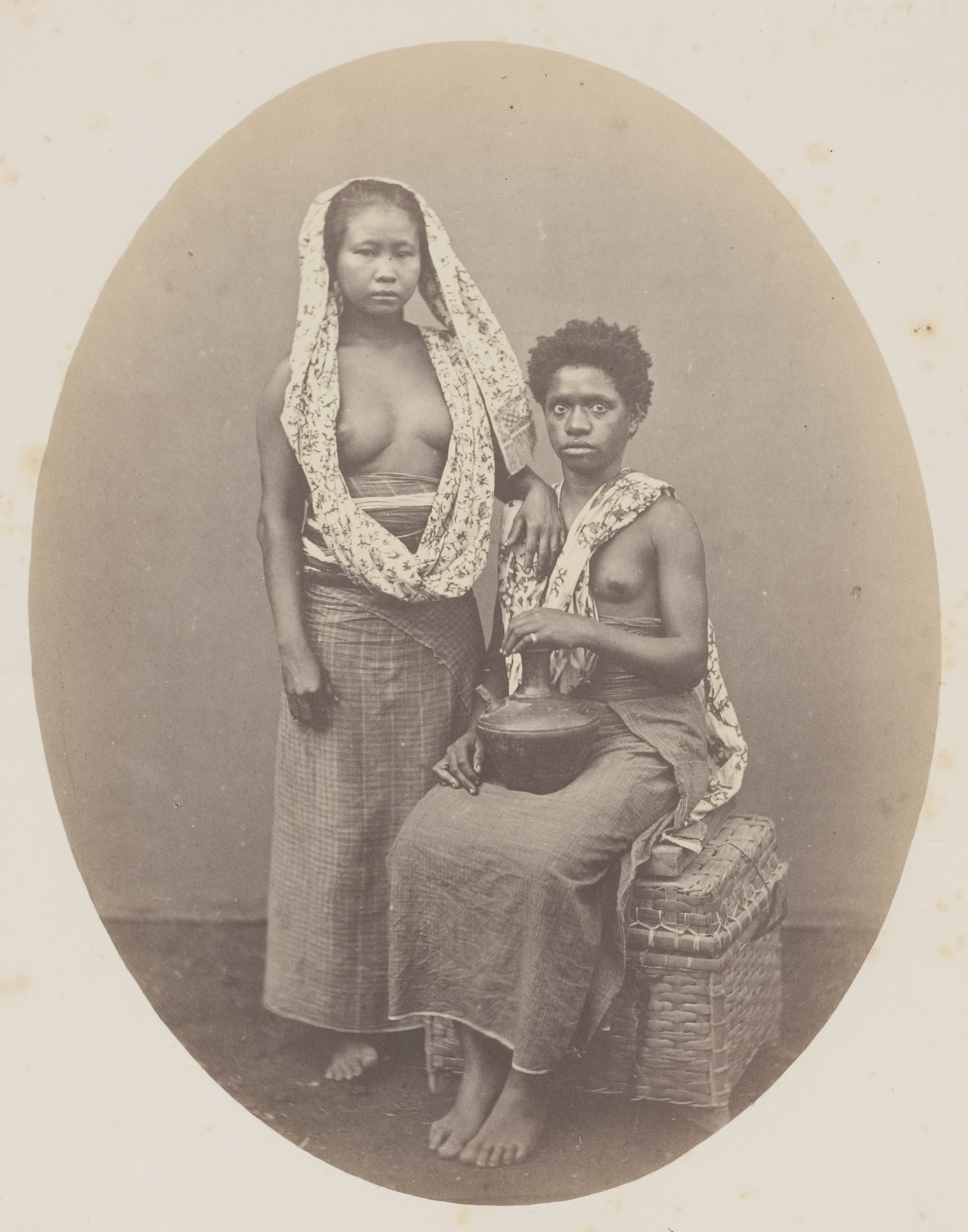
Balinese and Papuan slaves of the Rajah of Buleleng, 1865

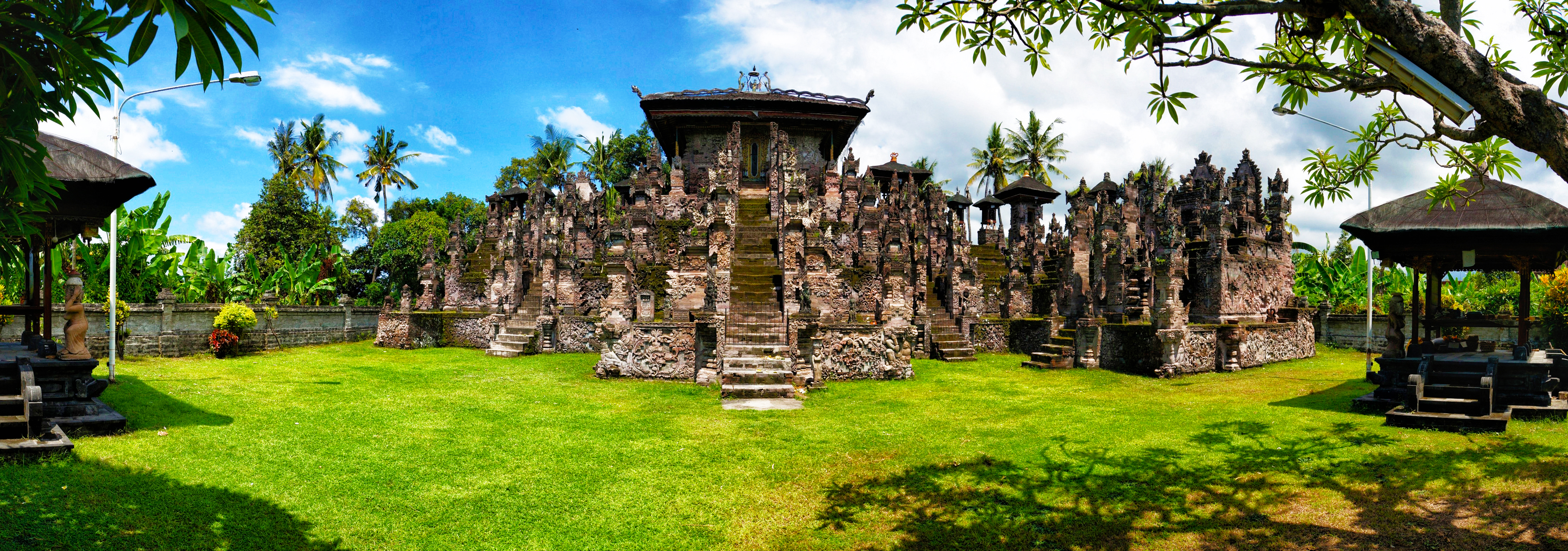
Pura Beji Sangsit in Sawan District.

== See also ==
- Subak (irrigation)
- Tukad Daya
- West Bali National Park
