= Busung Biu, Buleleng =

District in Buleleng Regency, Bali Province, Indonesia

Location within Buleleng

Busung Biu is a landlocked administrative district (kecamatan) in the regency of Buleleng in northern Bali, Indonesia. The Balinese government has been active in the district to increase village connectivity and was evaluated on 11 April 2007, in the village of Umejero.

== Towns and Villages ==
The district is sub-divided into 15 rural villages (desa) - all sharing the post code 81154 - as follows:

- 2001 Sepang
- 2002 Tista
- 2003 Bongancina
- 2004 Pucaksari
- 2005 Telaga
- 2006 Titab
- 2007 Subuk
- 2008 Tinggarsari
- 2009 Kedia (Kedis)
- 2010 Kekeran
- 2011 Busungbiu
- 2012 Pelapuan
- 2013 Bengkel
- 2014 Umejero
- 2015 Sepang Kelod
