= Menjangan Island =

Island of Indonesia, located in Provinsi Bali

Coordinates: 8.08333°S 114.517°E

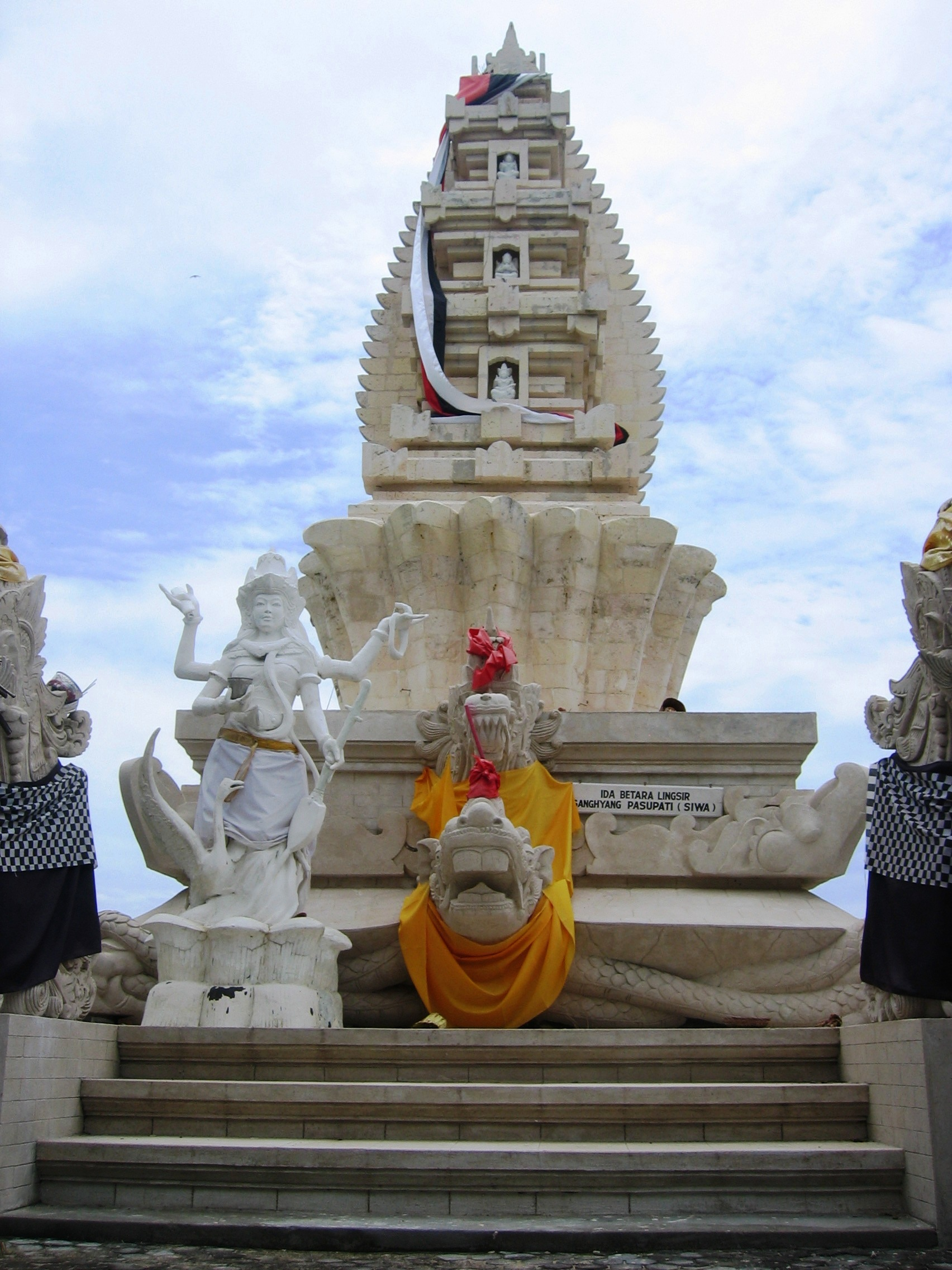
Menjangan Island, Bali, Indonesia.

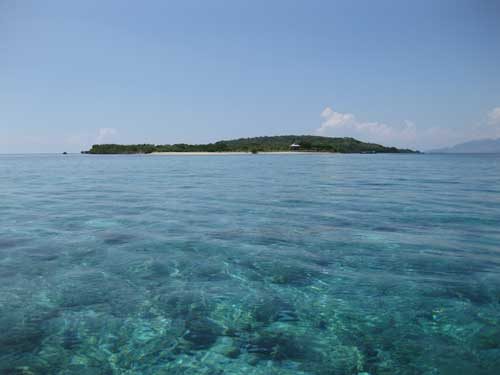
Menjangan Island, from the west

Menjangan Island (Indonesian: Pulau Menjangan; Balinese: ᬧᬸᬮᭀᬫᭂᬜ᭄ᬚ᭄ᬭᬗᬦ᭄) is a small island, located 5 miles to the north-west of Bali island and is part of the Indonesian archipelago. "Menjangan" in Balinese and Indonesian means "Deer". The name was given by the local population observing wild deer herds swimming to the island every spring and covering a distance of approximately 1.2 miles. Administratively, it is part of Buleleng Regency in Bali and is part of the Gerokgak district of Buleleng Regency.

== Locality ==
Even though the island is a significant part of Bali Barat National Park, it is assigned to the Javanese administrative district and falls under its jurisdiction. The closest big cities are: Singaraja, located in the north of Bali and Banyuwangi, located on the eastern coast of Java. The closest settlement is Sumberkima village. The nearest airport is Letkol Wisnu regional (approx. 8 miles from the island) and the nearest commercial airport is Banyuwangi International Airport in neighboring province Eastern Java.

== General information ==
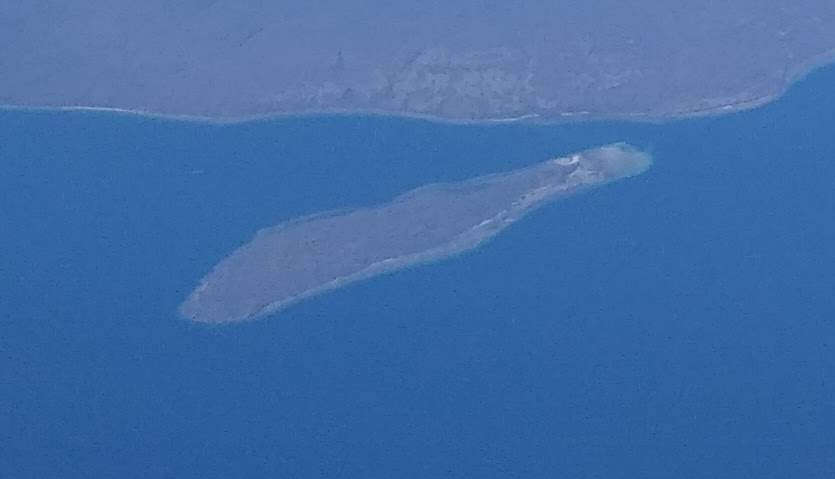
Menjangan Island seen from the air

| Size | about 15 square miles |
| Surface | sand and dry turf |
| Inhabitants | 16 Hindu monks |
| Structures | mooring harbor (west), 3 Hindu temples |
| Fauna | wild deer, wild rabbits, monitor lizards, wild chicken |

== Marine life ==
The island is considered to be an important part of the local tourism industry, because its marine fauna incorporates one of the best-preserved coral reefs in the area. All scuba-diving shops arrange daily trips to the island.

== Conservation ==
The Biosphere Program has been inviting students from around the globe to participate in the preservation of Menjangan Island's coral reefs. Participants were taught to identify different types of coral and conditions that can threaten the coral. Another group of participants installed a mooring buoy designed to prevent further anchor damage to the coral by tourist boats.

== Gallery ==
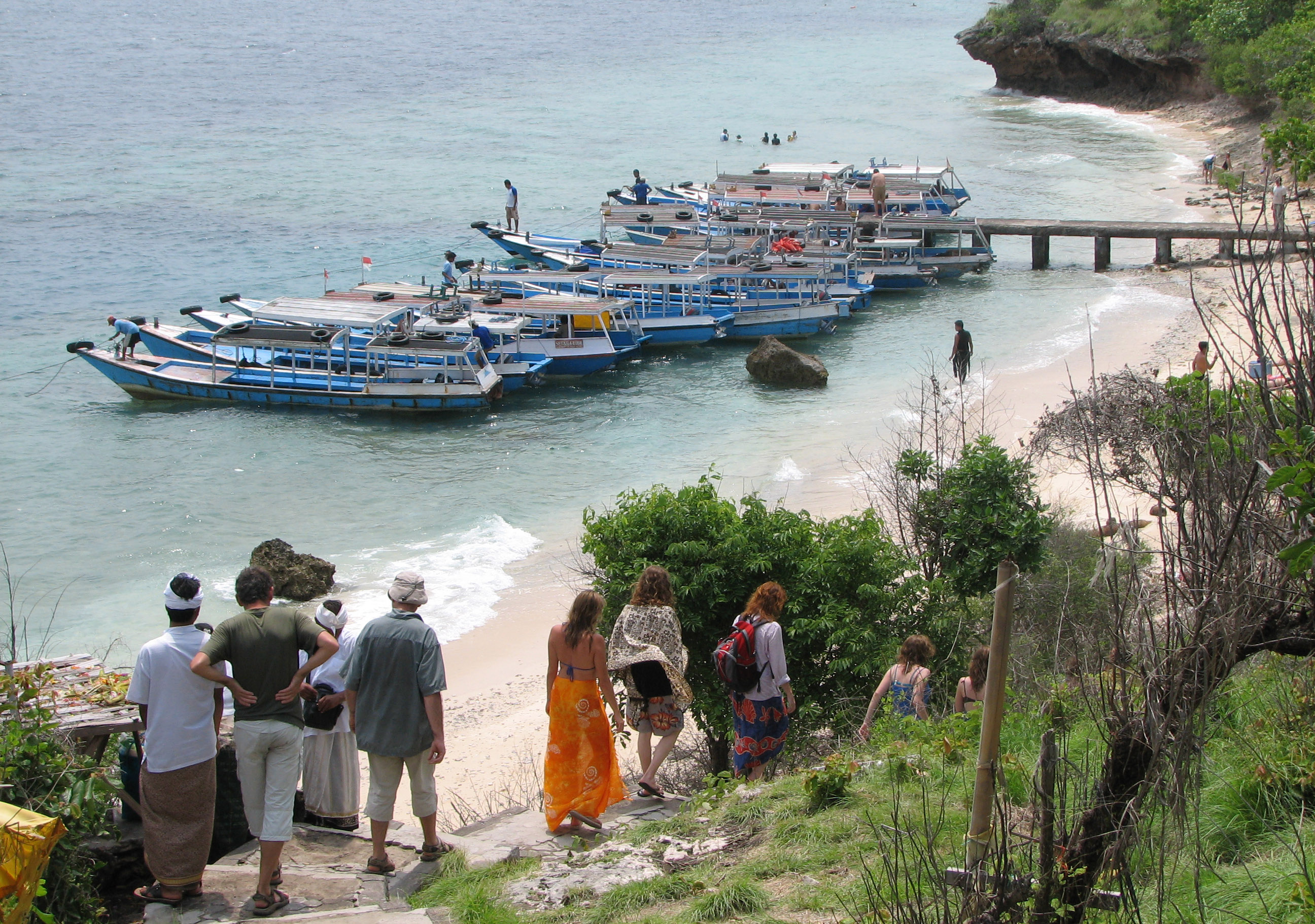
Tourists in Menjangan Island

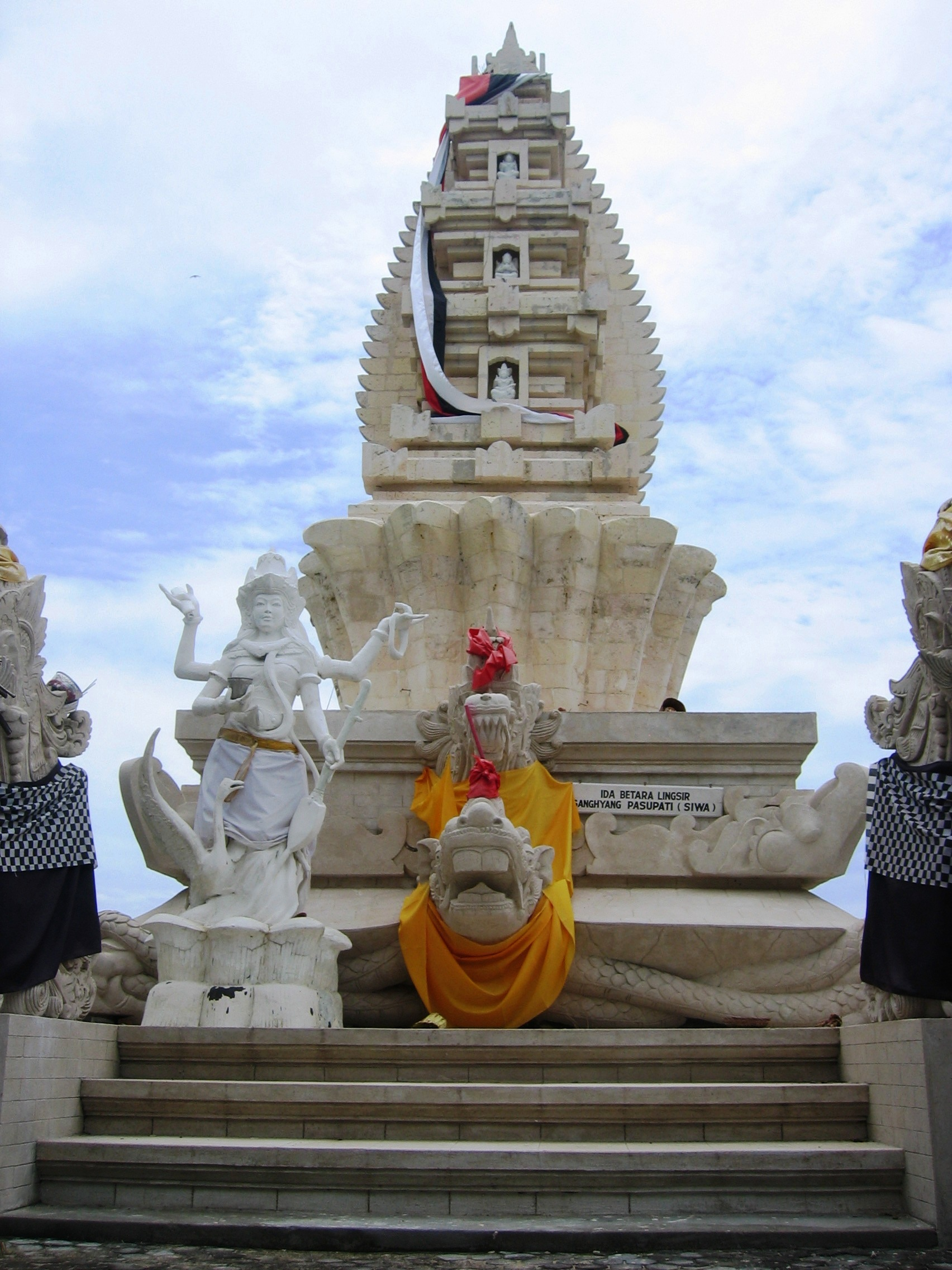
Pura Taman Kelenting Sari.

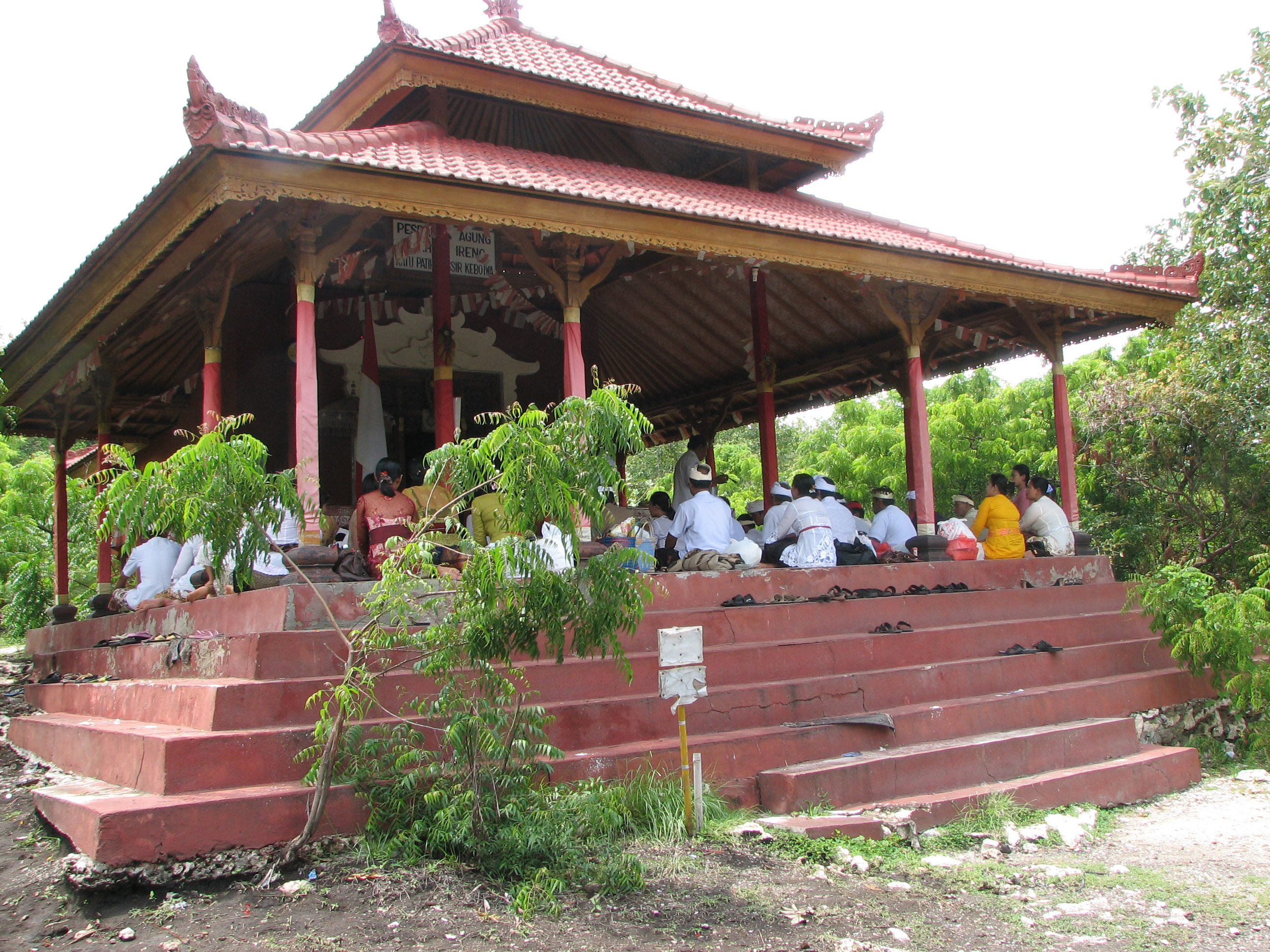
A temple where the Patih Kebo Iwa is honored.

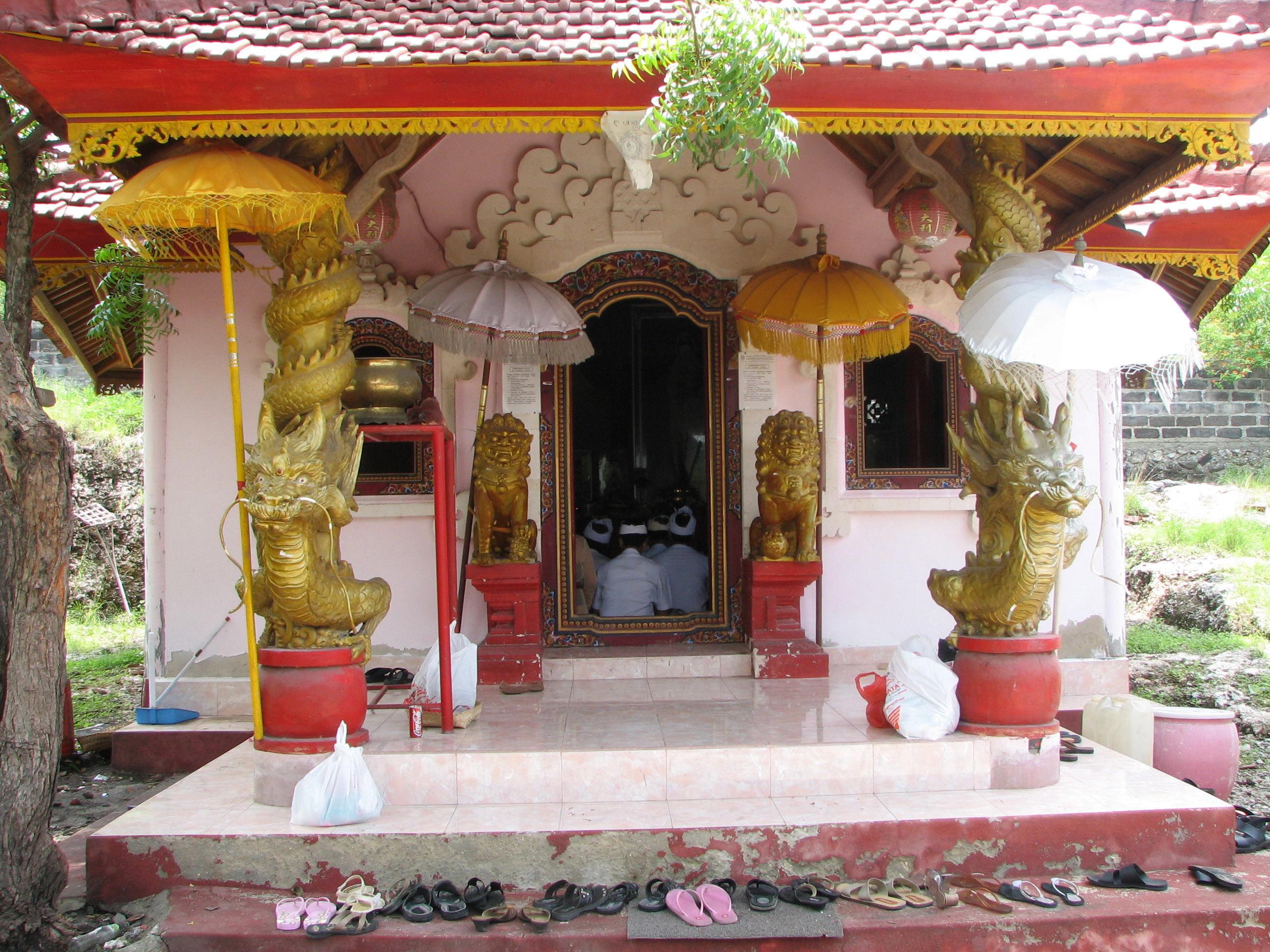
Temple where Goddess Kwan Im is worshiped.

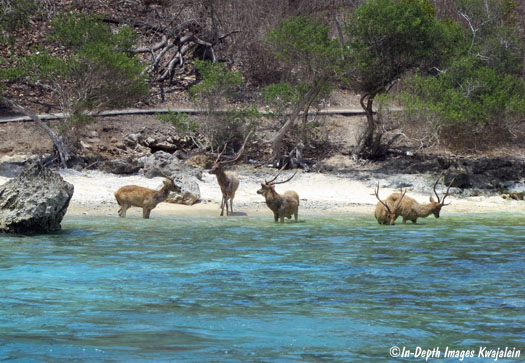
Deer in Menjangan Island.

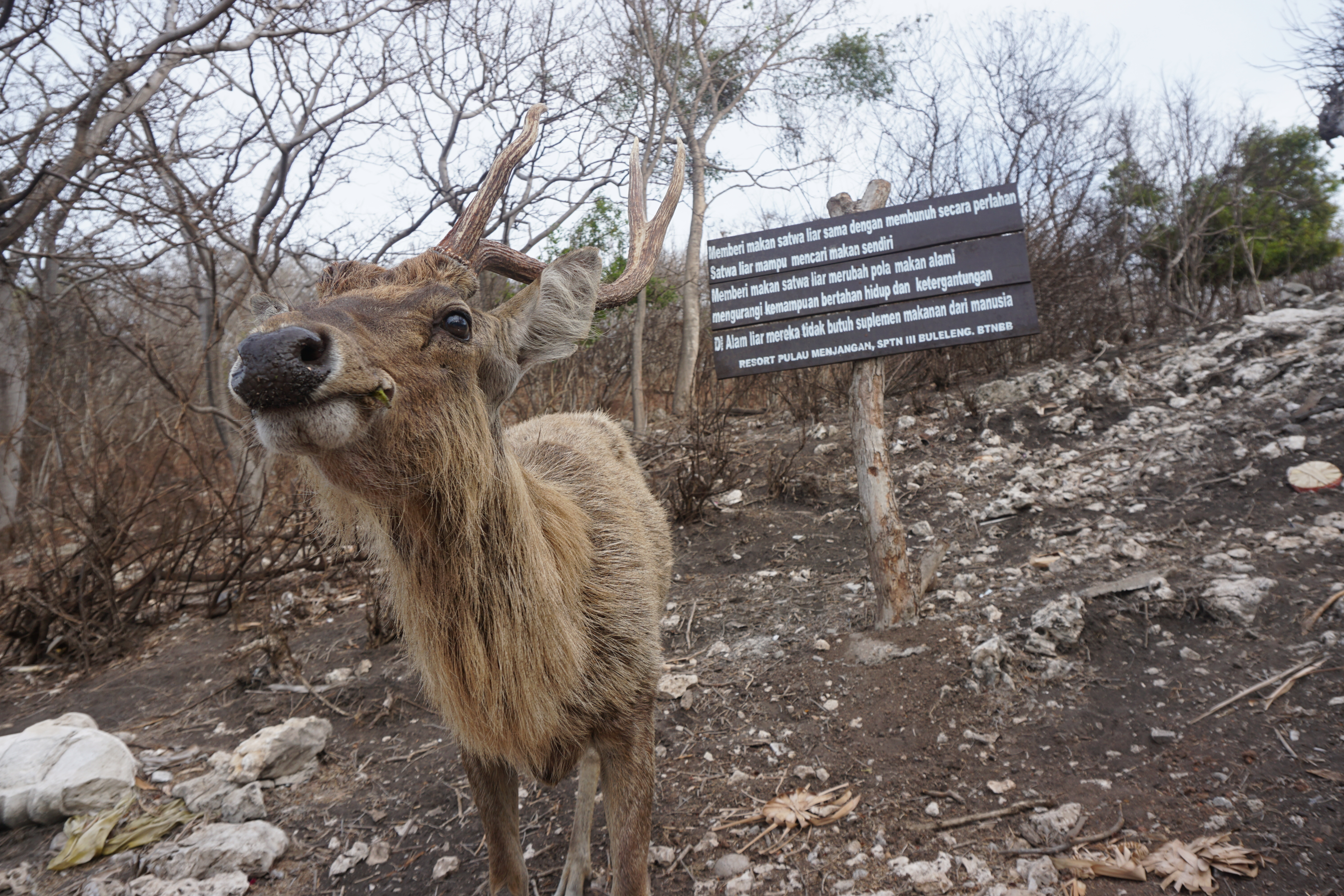
A deer in Menjangan Island.

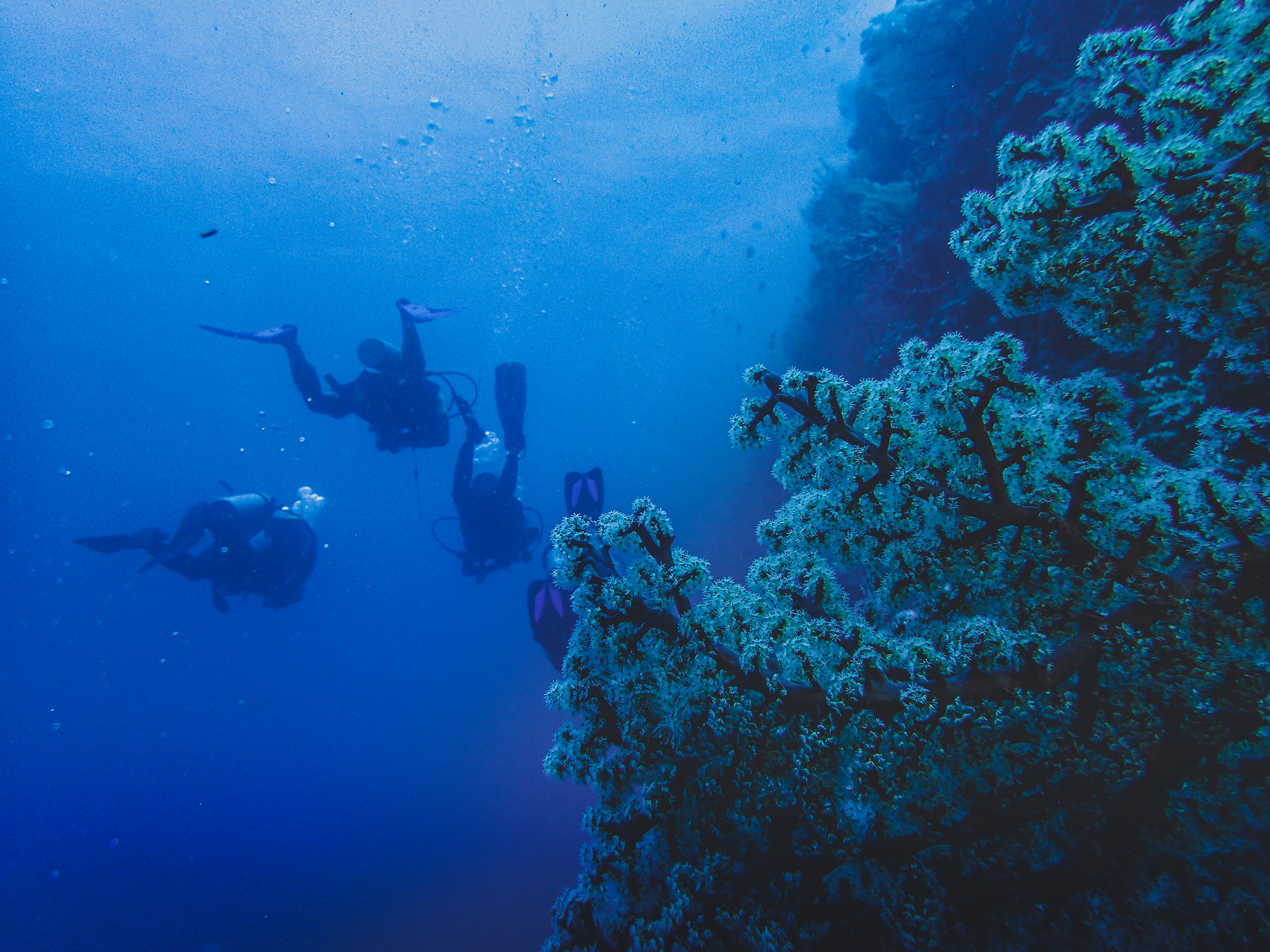
Diving activities in Menjangan Island.
