= West Bali National Park =

National park in Bali, Indonesia

- Taman Nasional Bali Barat
- IUCN category II (national park)
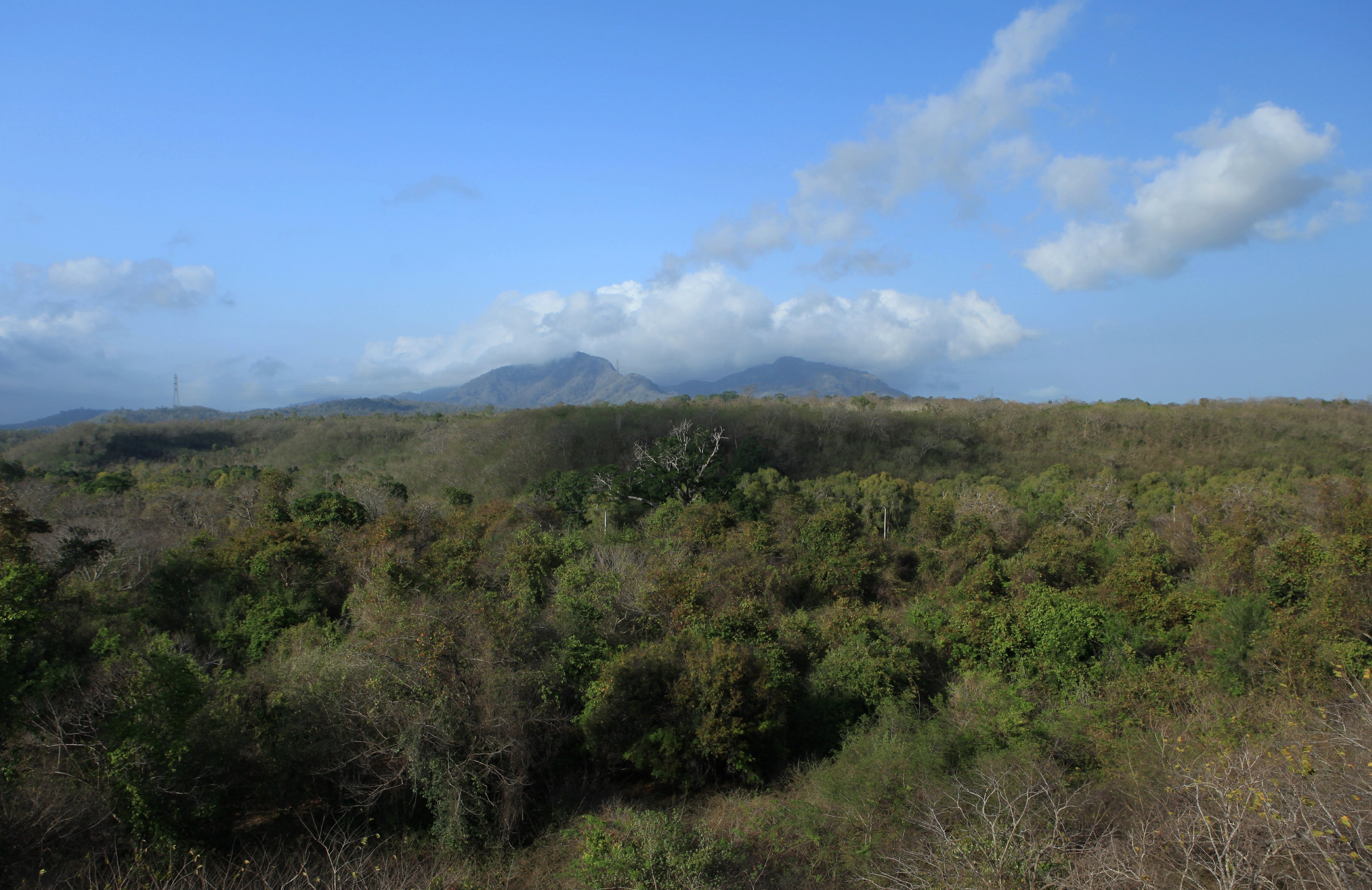

- Location within Bali
- Location: Buleleng, Bali, Indonesia
- Coordinates: 8°09′S 114°30′E
- Area: 190.0289 km^{2} (73.3706 sq mi)
- Established: 1941
- Visitors: 5,592 (in 2007)
- Governing body: Ministry of Environment and Forestry

West Bali National Park (Indonesian: Taman Nasional Bali Barat) is a national park located in Buleleng Regency and Jembrana Regency, on the west point of Bali, Indonesia. The park covers just over 190 square kilometres (73 sq mi), some 82% of which is on land and the remainder at sea. This is approximately 3% of Bali's total land area.

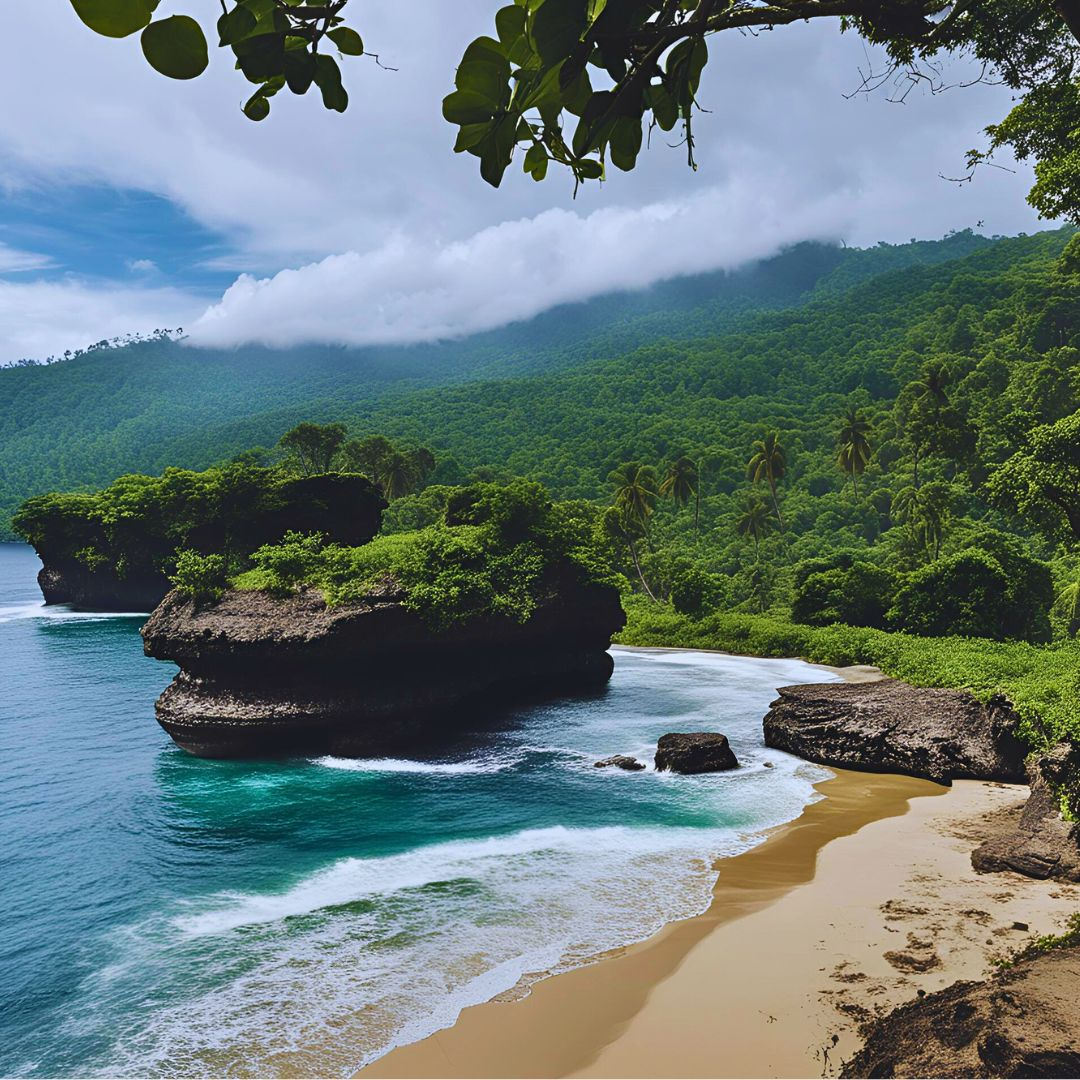
West Bali National Park coastline

== History ==
The park was established in 1941 on 740 km^{2}, aiming at protecting Bali tigers (Panthera tigris ssp. balica) - the last of which, as it happened, had already been killed. The surface of the park was reduced to 190.0289 km^{2} in 1985; the newly excluded area was designated as protected reserve.

More recently, there are talks about converting some or all the park into a biosphere reserve under the Man and Biosphere Unesco program, which allows for local people to keep their traditional close relation with their environment. This better corresponds to the recommendation 5.29 of the Vth IUCN World Parks Congress whereby 'protected areas should not exist as islands, divorced from the social, cultural and economic context in which they are located'.
In 1994 the Regulation 18/1994 was issued at a national level, with a clause on Nature Tourism Enterprising in Utilisation Zone of the National Parks, Botanical Garden, and Recreation Parks. This clause allows private tourism companies to operate in the utilisation zones of National Parks while keeping in line with the main aim "to increase the use of natural beauty and uniqueness of the National Park's utilisation zone, botanical garden and recreation parks" (n° 18, article 2, point 2). It also requires "private tourism enterprises to involve the people living in the surrounding areas in their business activities" (article 10, point e), in order to help reduce local people's dependency on forest or marine resources for their livelihood. It also makes better use of their local and traditional knowledge, imbedded in the local systems and institutions, and allows for the development of new approaches for stewardship and for adapting and transforming governance.

== Description ==
The park covers a surface of 19,002.89 square kilometres (7,337.06 sq mi), with 15,587.89 square kilometres (6,018.52 sq mi) of land (82,02 %) and 3,415 square kilometres (1,319 sq mi) of sea (19,98 %). This covers nearly 5% of Bali's entire land surface.

West of the park is the seaport village of Gilimanuk, and the villages of Pahlenkong and Pejarakan are to the east. The park has three entrances: one by the coastal road in the north, coming from Lovina Beach, Pemuteran and Banjuwedang; one by the coastal road coming from the south, reaching Gilimanuk; and by ferries from Ketapang, East Java, to Gilimanuk.

The park is not quite in one block: a peninsula of around 65 square kilometres (25 sq mi) juts out to the north-west and is separated from Bali's mainland by the island's coastal road linking Gilimanuk to the south-west, the village of Slumberklampok in the middle, and Pantai Teluk Terima ("beach of the bay of Terima") in Terima Bay to the north-east (and to further places of Bali's north-west coast) (see map below); most of that part of the coastal road is not included in the park. Gilimanuk itself is not included in the park either; nor is Pantai Teluk Terima and about 1 km of its surroung coast in Terima Bay.

It includes several habitats: a savanna, mangroves, montane and mixed-monsoon forests, coastal forest and seagrass, and coral islands. To the north, The park includes a 1,000-metre (3,300 ft) long beach, reef, and islets. The highest elevations in the park are Mount Kelatakan at 698 metres (2,290 ft) and Mount Prapat Agung at 375 metres (1,230 ft). (Note: Some sites and scholarly articles give the highest elevations as Mount Patas at 1,412 metres (4,633 ft) and Mount Merbuk at 1,388 metres (4,554 ft). Neither of these mounts are within the present park limits.)

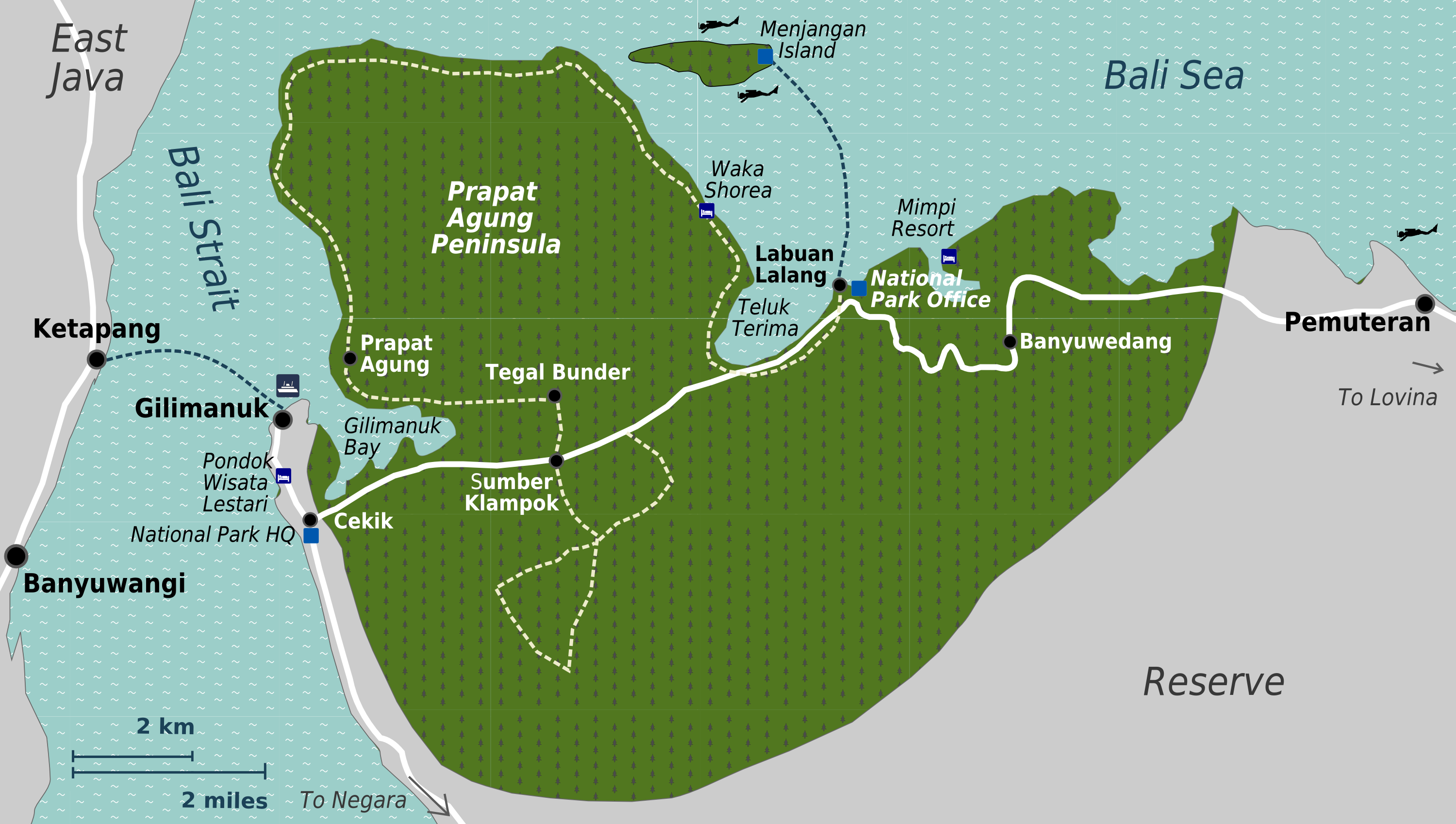
Map of the park

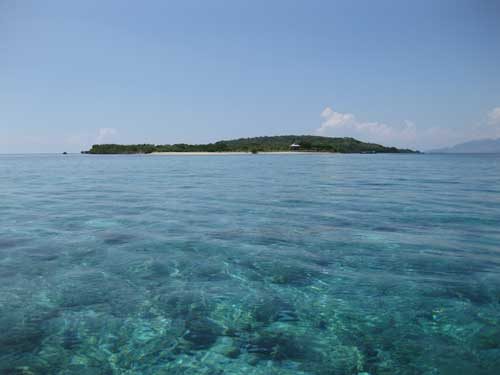
Menjangan Island

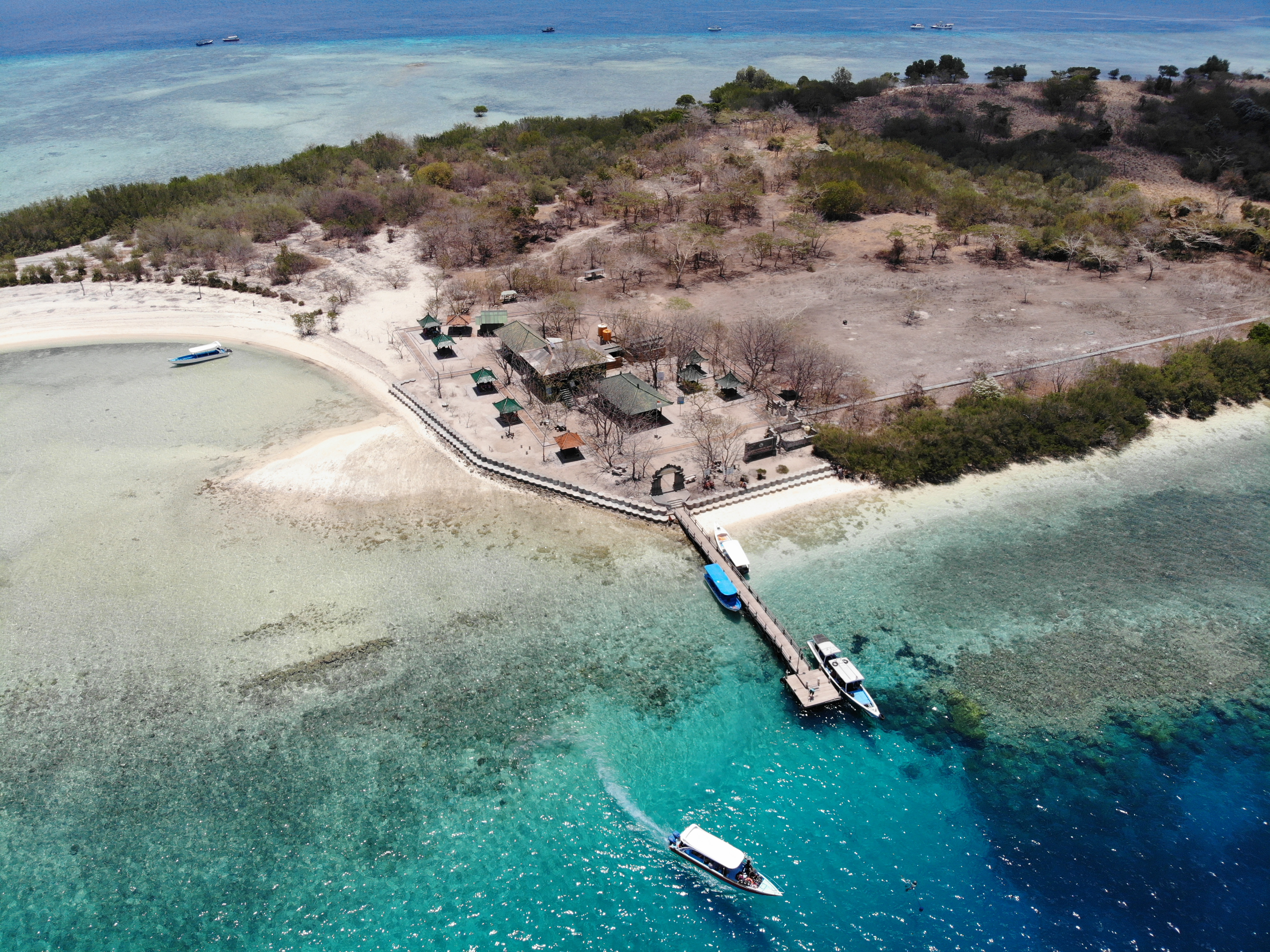
Menjangan Island

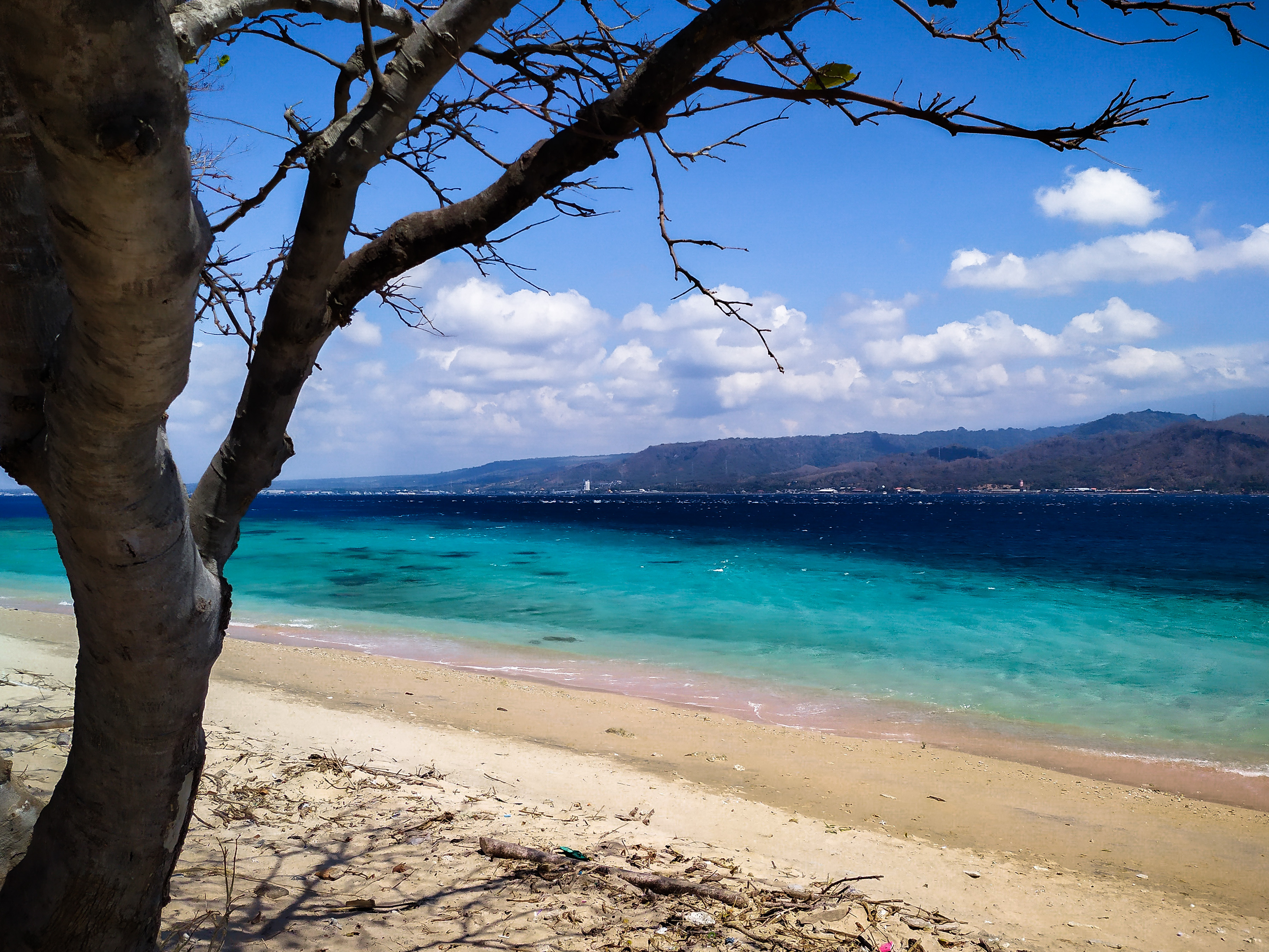
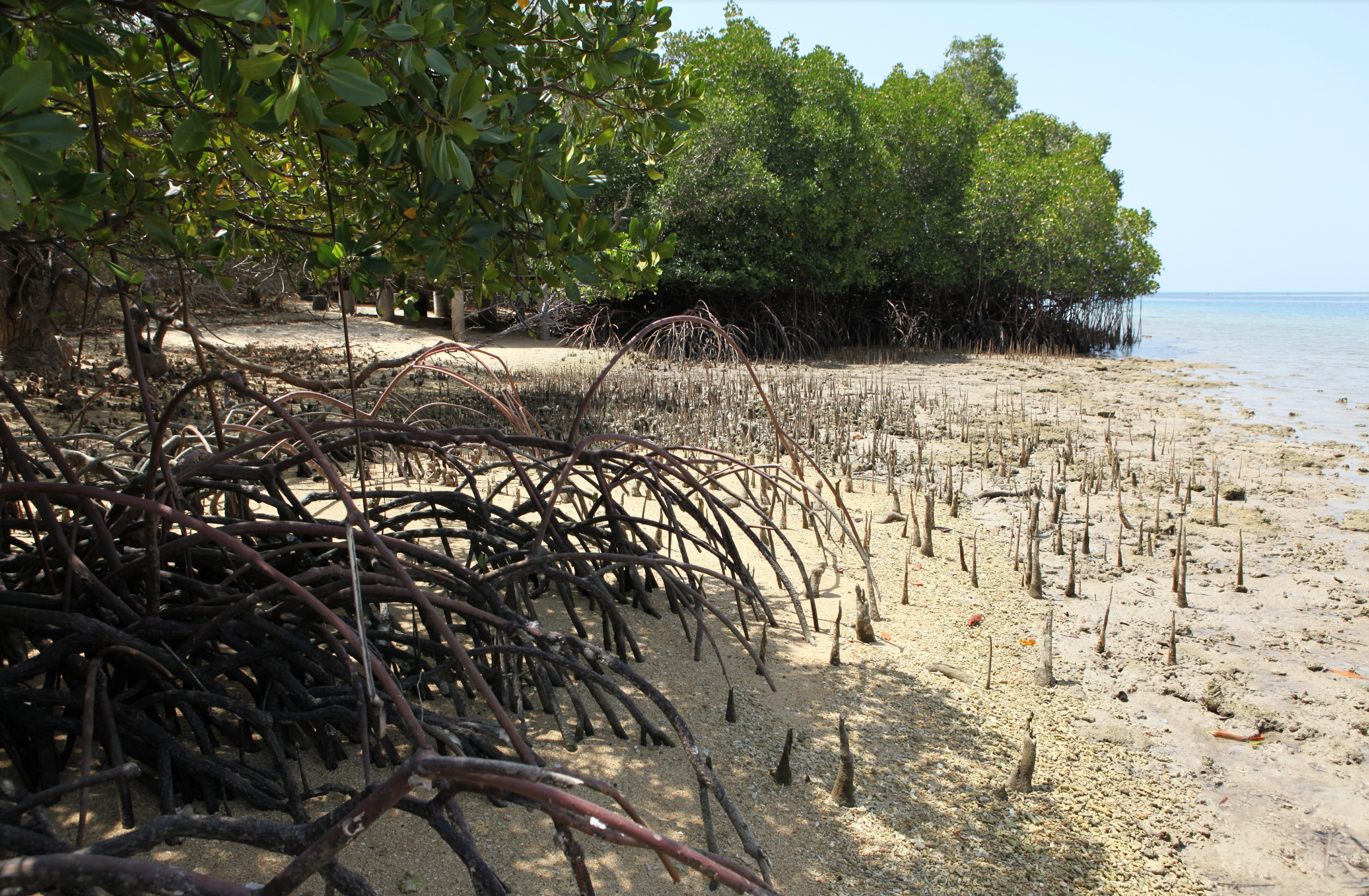
Mangroves

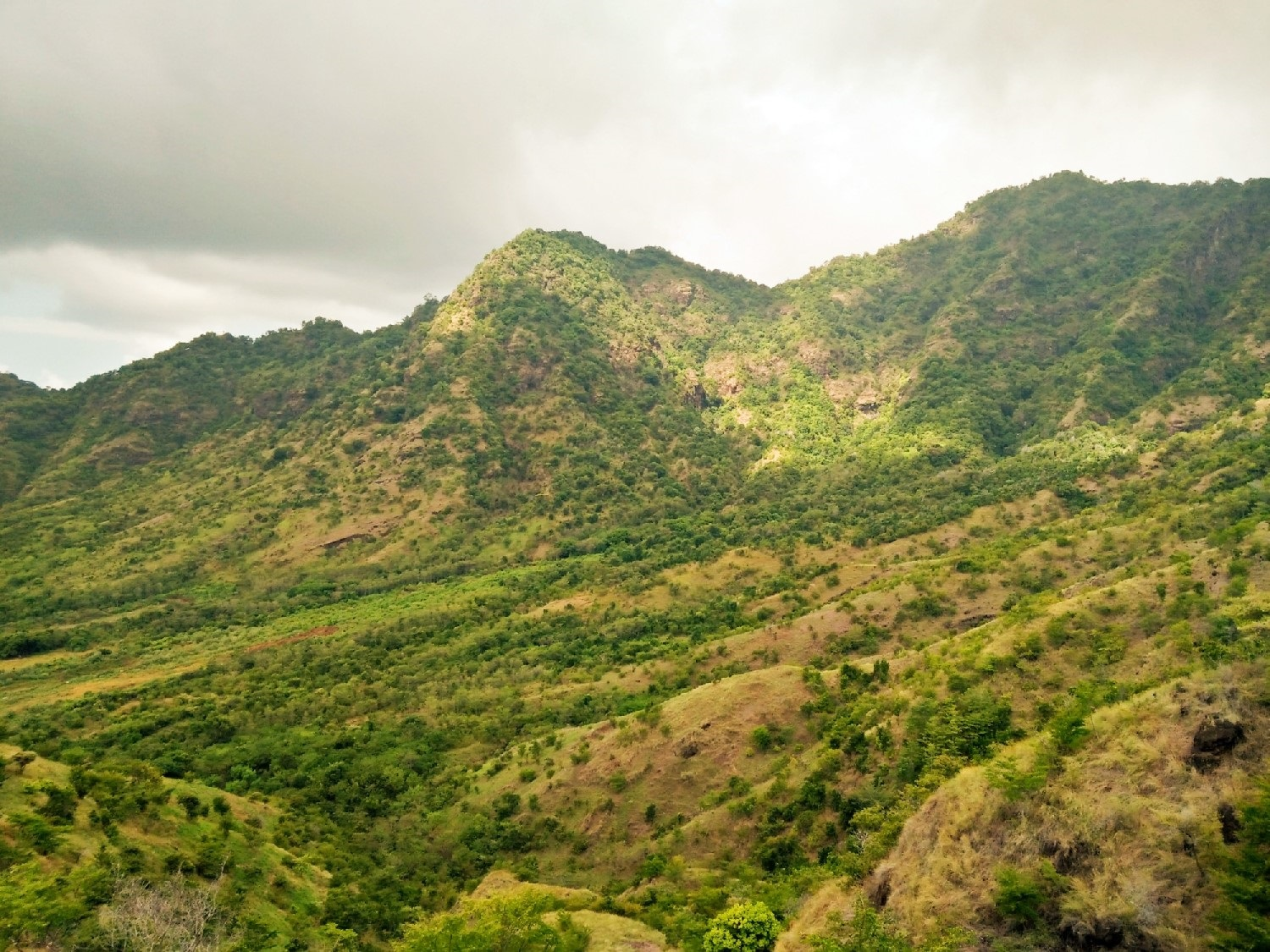
The hills (May 2020)

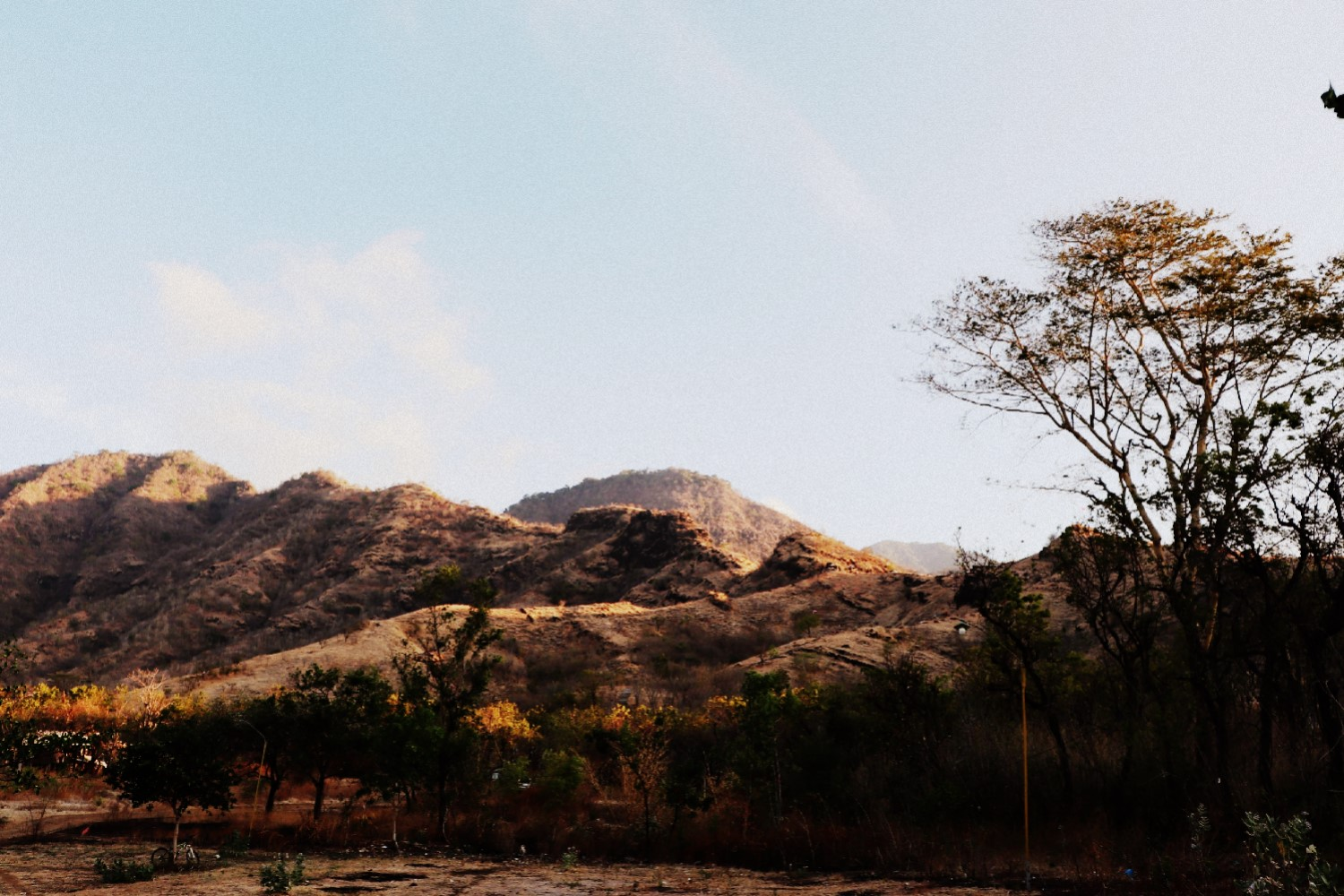
Savana (May 2020)

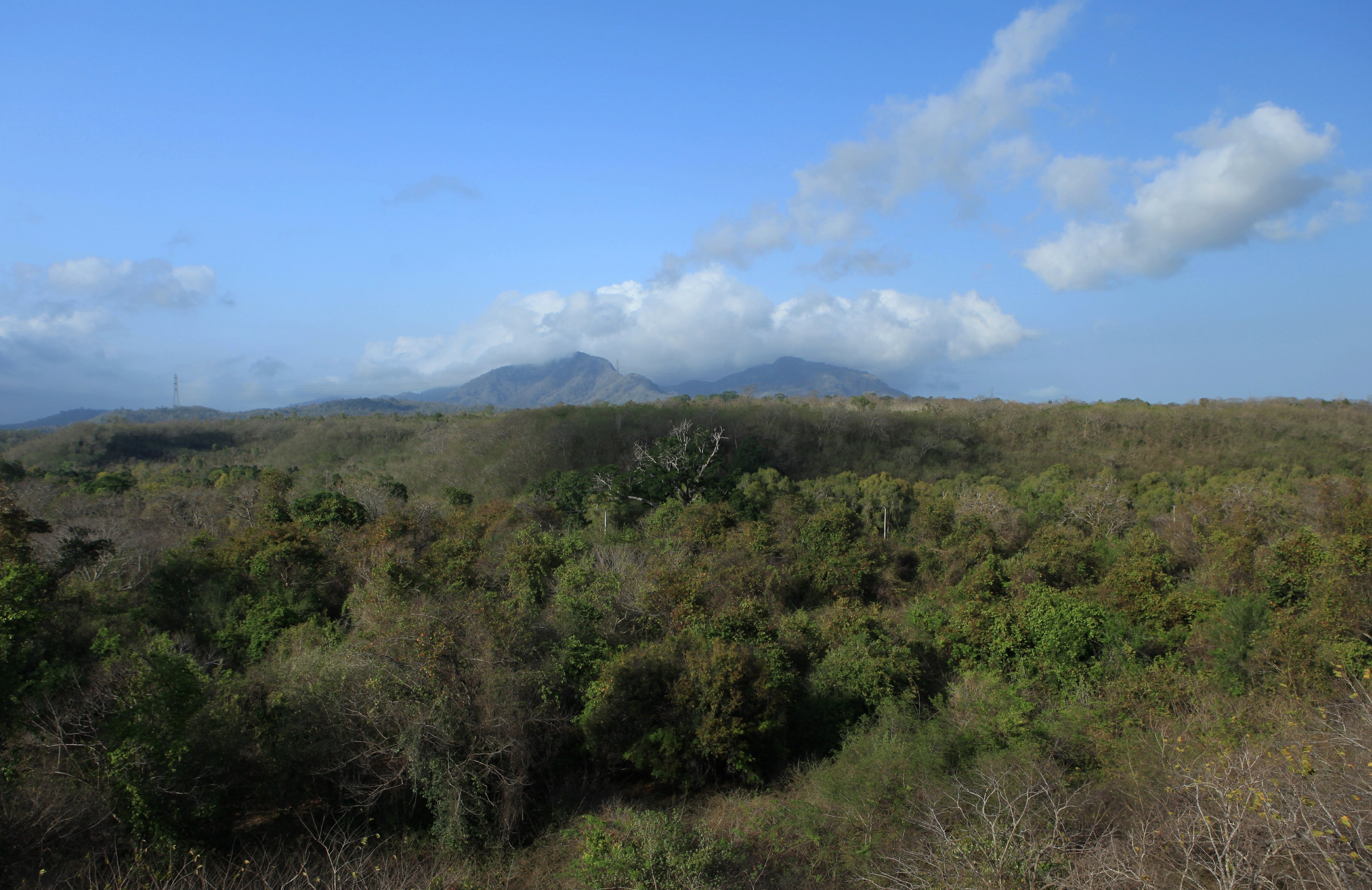
Flats (September 2009)

It also includes several temples, among which the Dang Kahyangan Prapat Agung temple some 2 km north of Prapat Agung beach (where one can see a beautiful gradation of coastal sea hues from vivid turquoise to deep indigo) and 400 m away from the coast. This temple boasts an intriguing pond less than 50 sq. m., the water of which varies between five different colours: red, black, yellow, white, clear, and blue. That pond is mentioned in the Dwijendra Tatwa which recounts the journey made by the charismatic figure Dang Hyang Nirartha in Bali, Lombok and Sumbawa. The Dwijendra Tatwa is written on a lontar. The whereabouts of the temple had been forgotten, as it is very isolated in the forest; it has only been (re-)discovered in 1990, through researches based on the Dwijendra Tatwa. Thanks to the temple standing within the national park, any development is strictly restricted to what nature dictates — although a narrow road can bee seen on some photos.

Banyuwedang hotspring (Pemandian Air Panas Banyuwedang), near the Mimpi resort in Pejarakan, has an average temperature of 40 °C — the hottest hot spring in Bali. Royals used to bathe there and the spring waters are believed to have healing properties.

== Flora and fauna ==
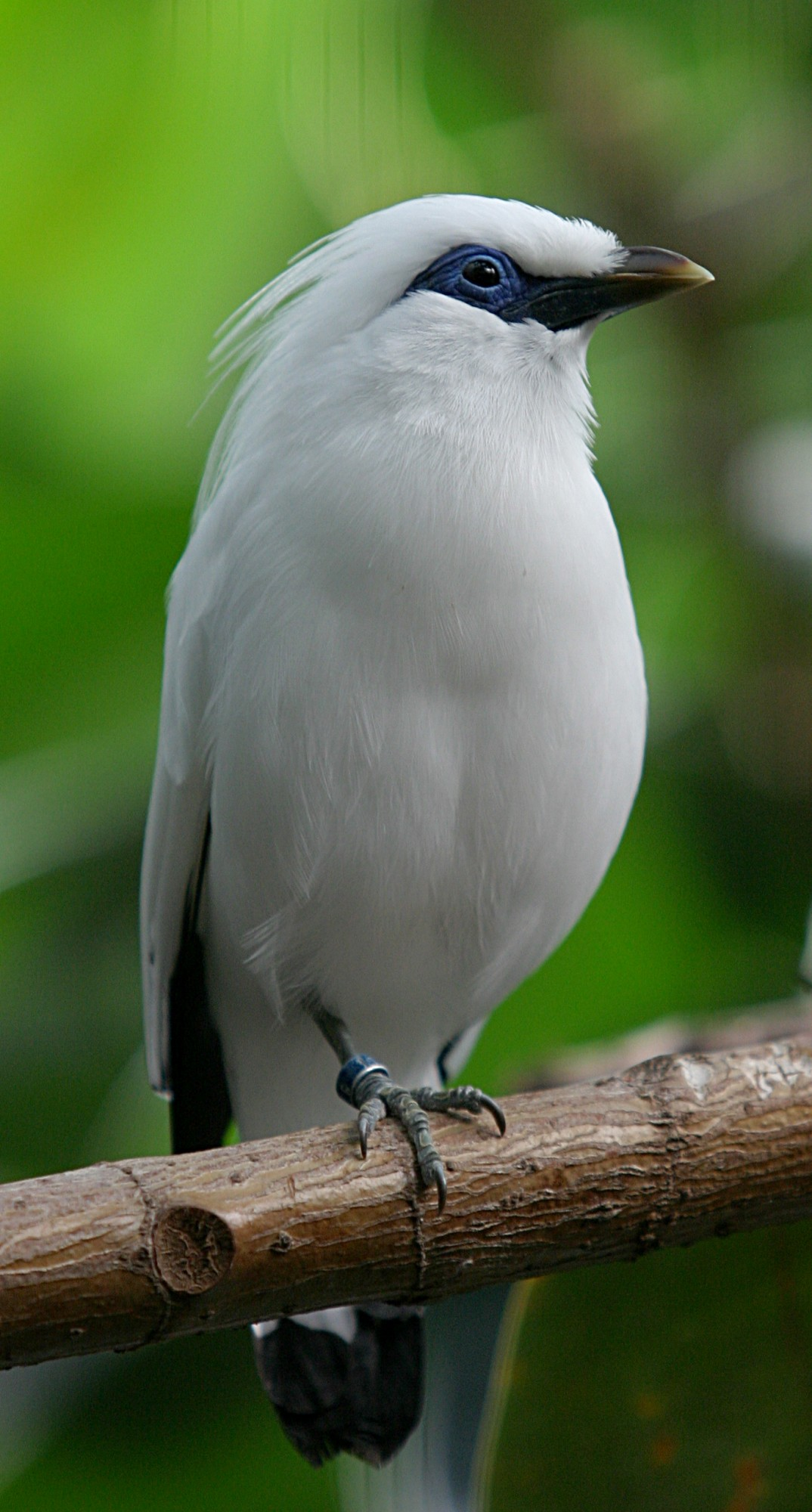
Last stronghold of the endangered Bali myna

=== Fauna ===
Some 160 animal species are found inside the park.

Birds

Birds include the critically endangered Bali myna, along with the crested serpent-eagle, milky stork, savanna nightjar, barn swallow, Pacific swallow, red-rumped swallow, crested treeswift, dollarbird, black-naped oriole, Java sparrow, lesser adjutant, long-tailed shrike, black racket-tailed treepie, sacred kingfisher, stork-billed kingfisher, yellow-vented bulbul.

In June 2011, West Bali National Park received forty Bali mynas released from Surabaya Zoo and twenty from Taman Safari Indonesia.

Birds

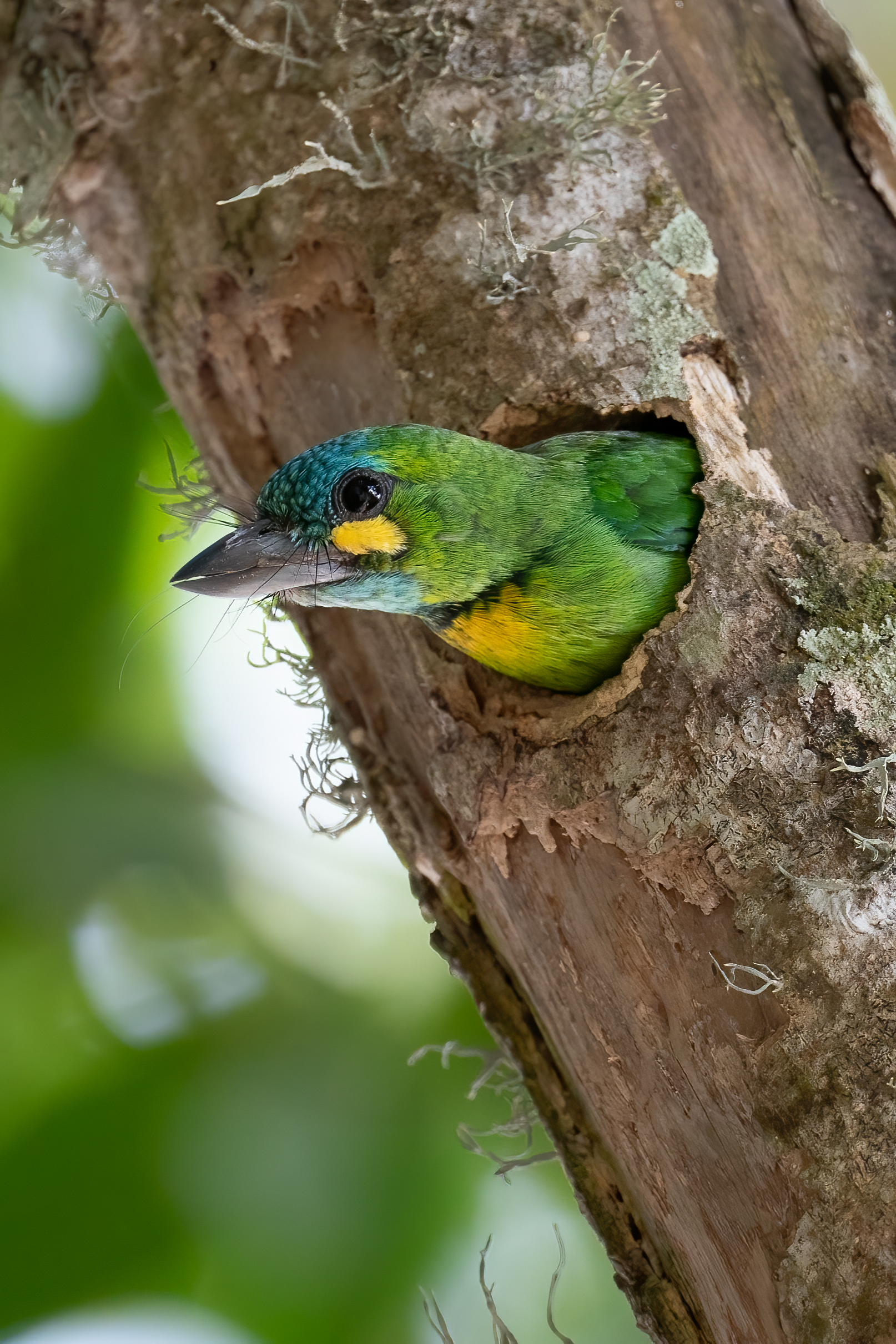
Yellow-eared barbet

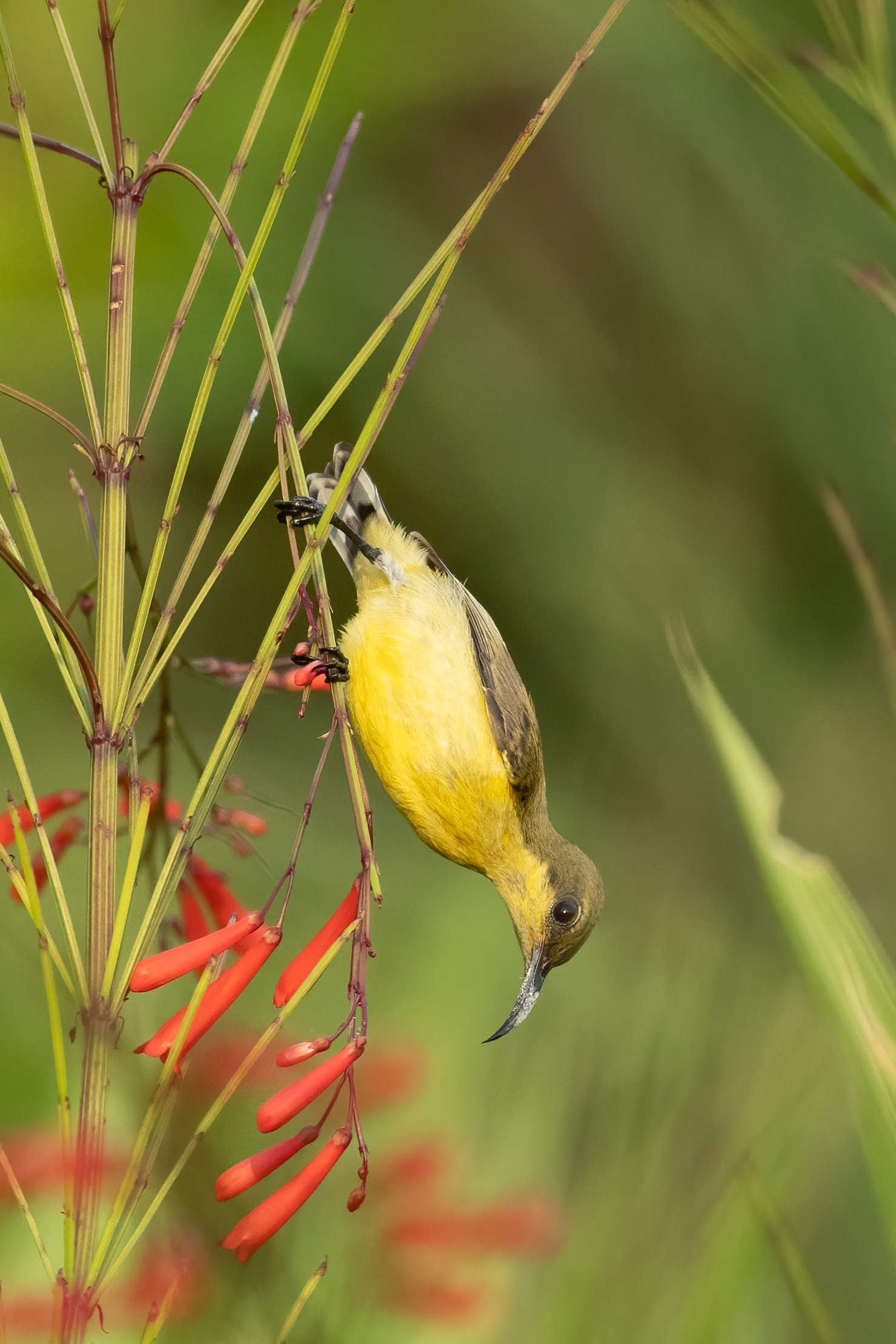
Olive-backed sunbird

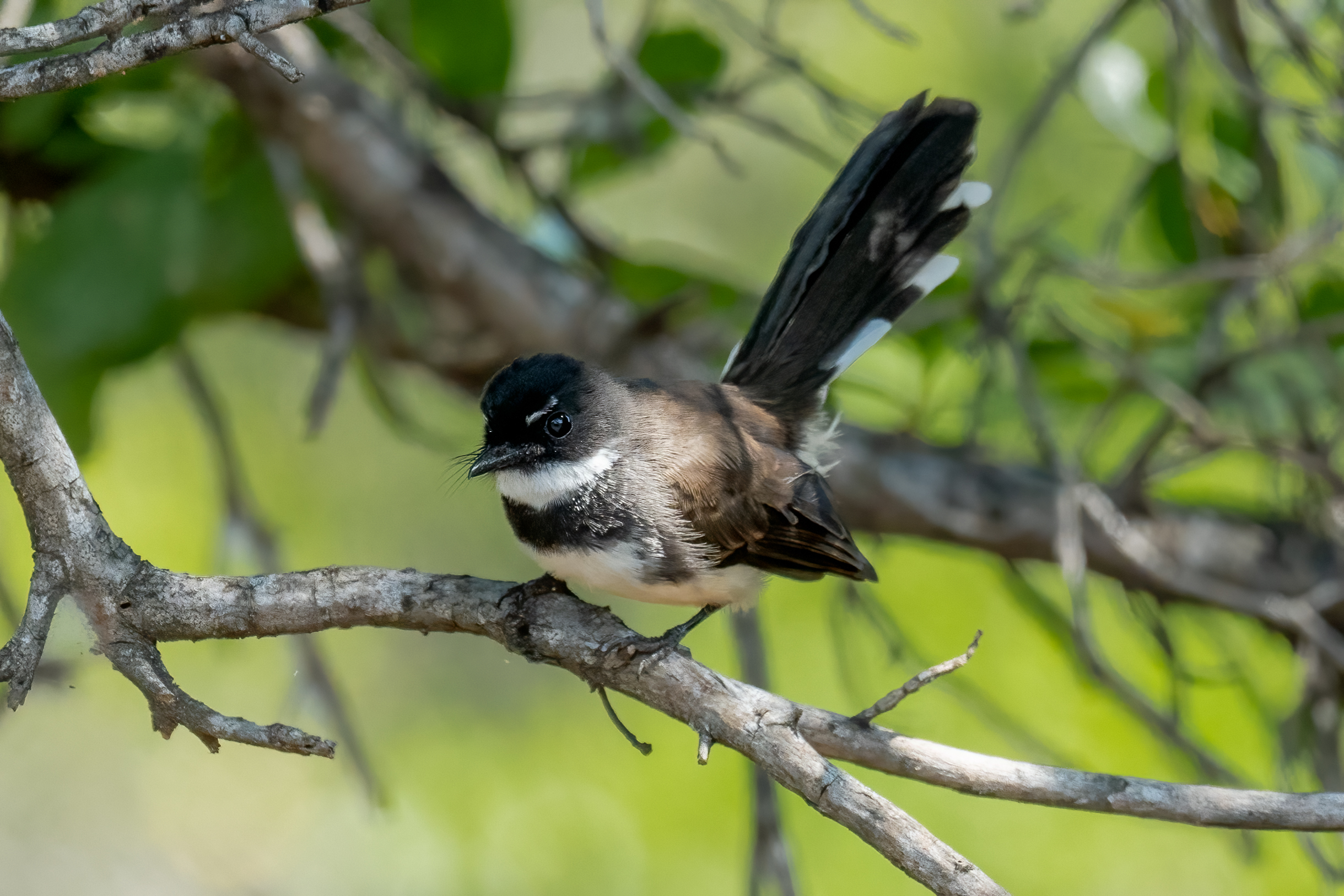
Malaysian pied fantail

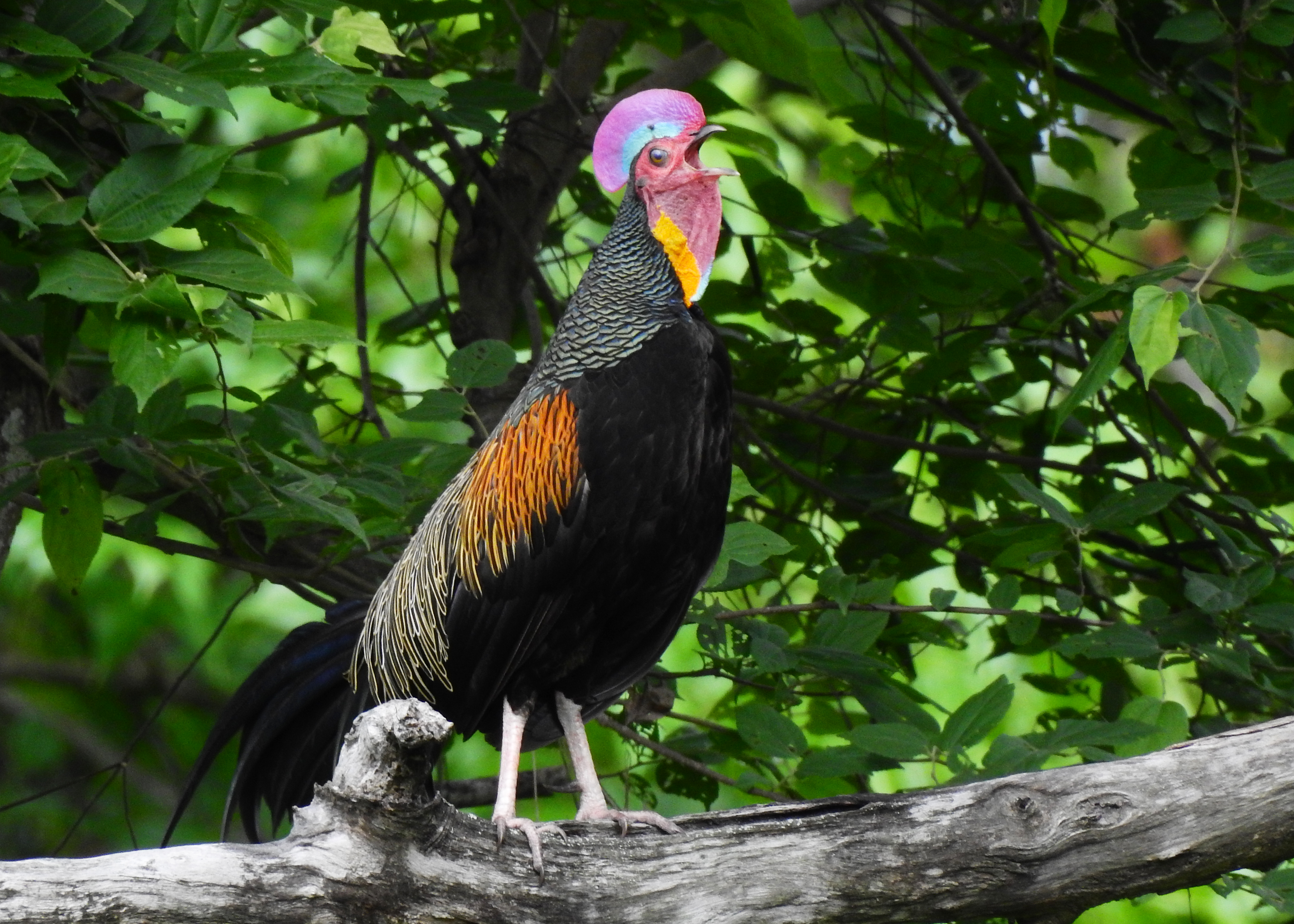
Green junglefowl (Gallus varius Javan junglefowl)

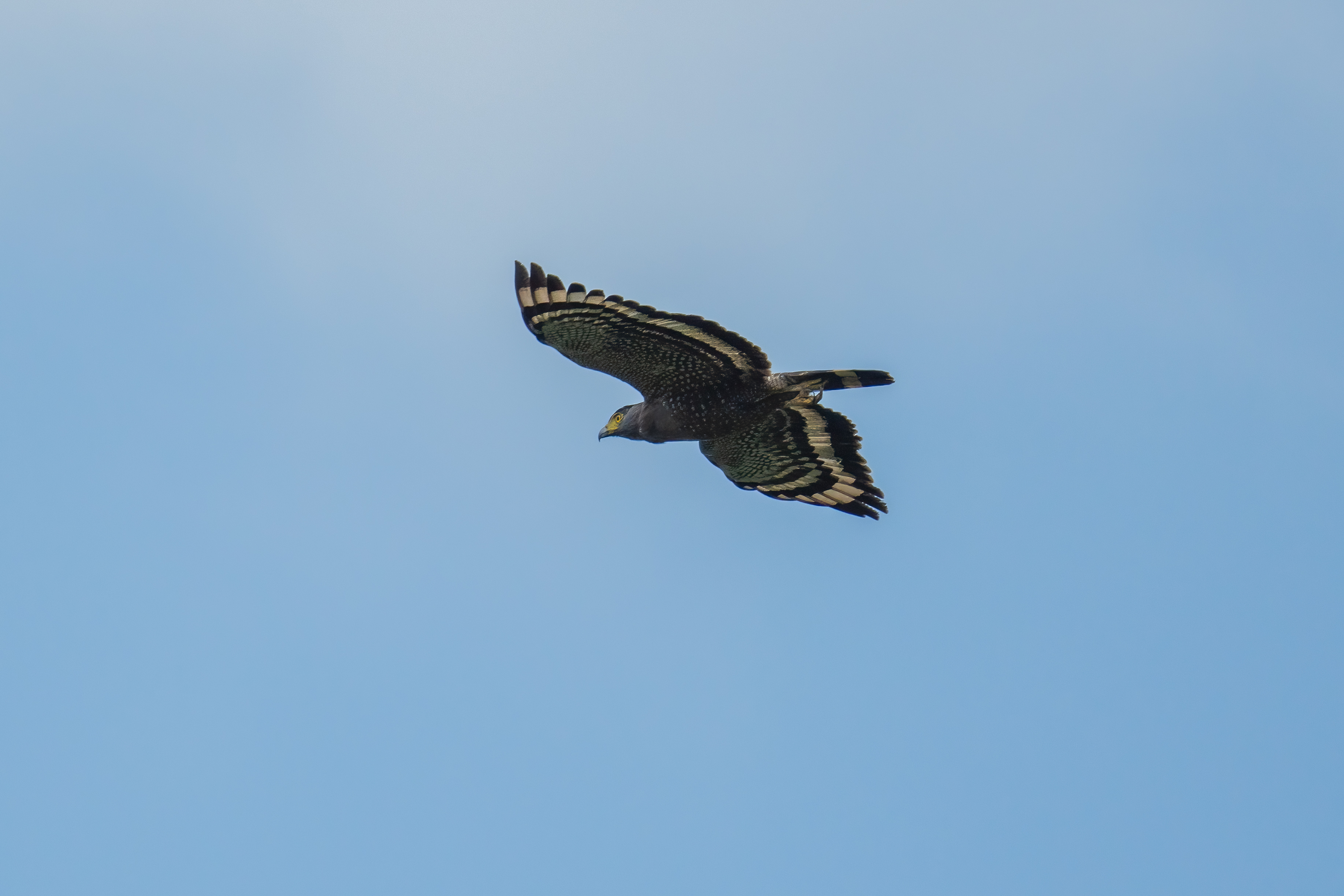
Crested serpent eagle

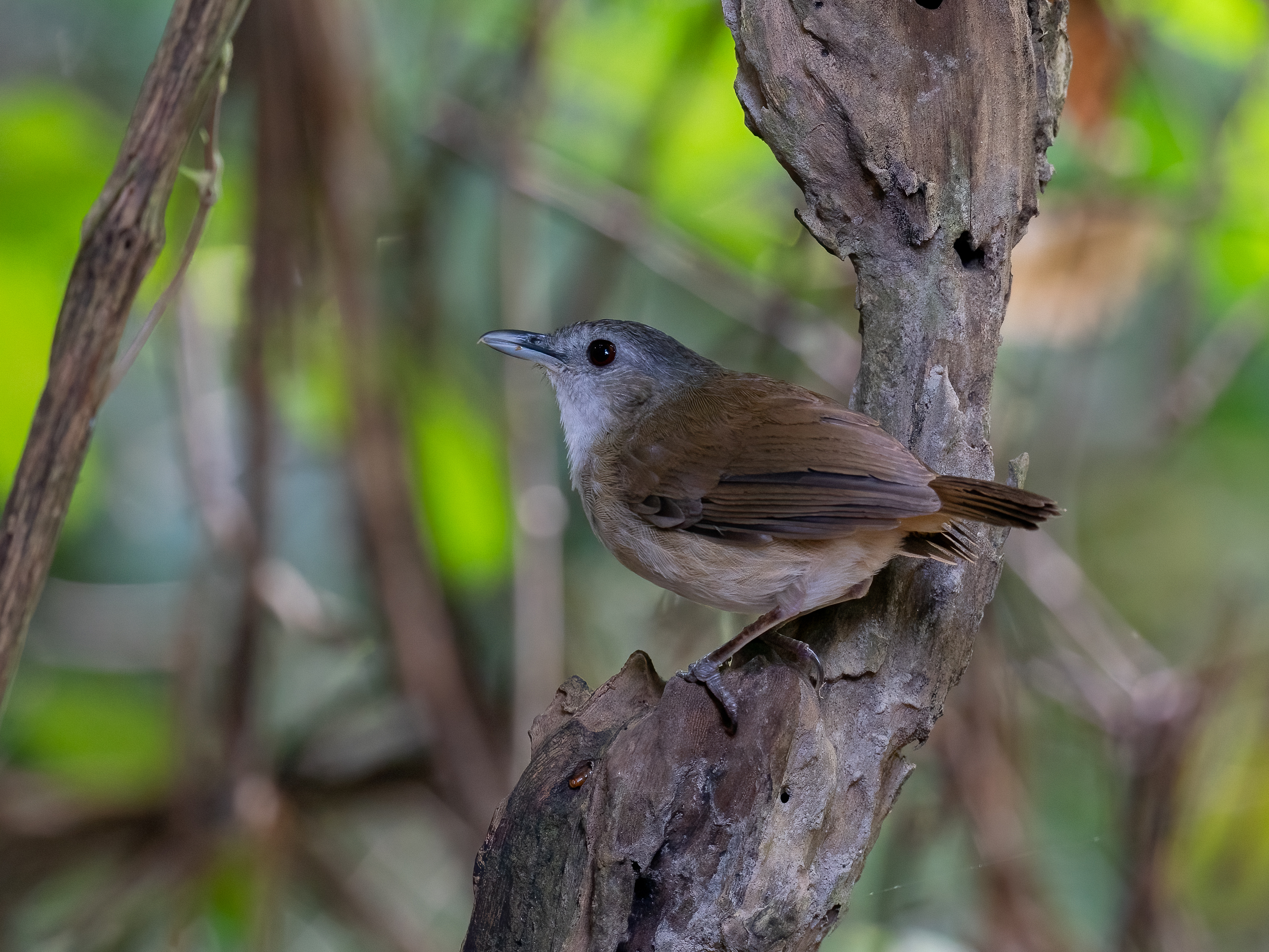
Horsfield's babbler

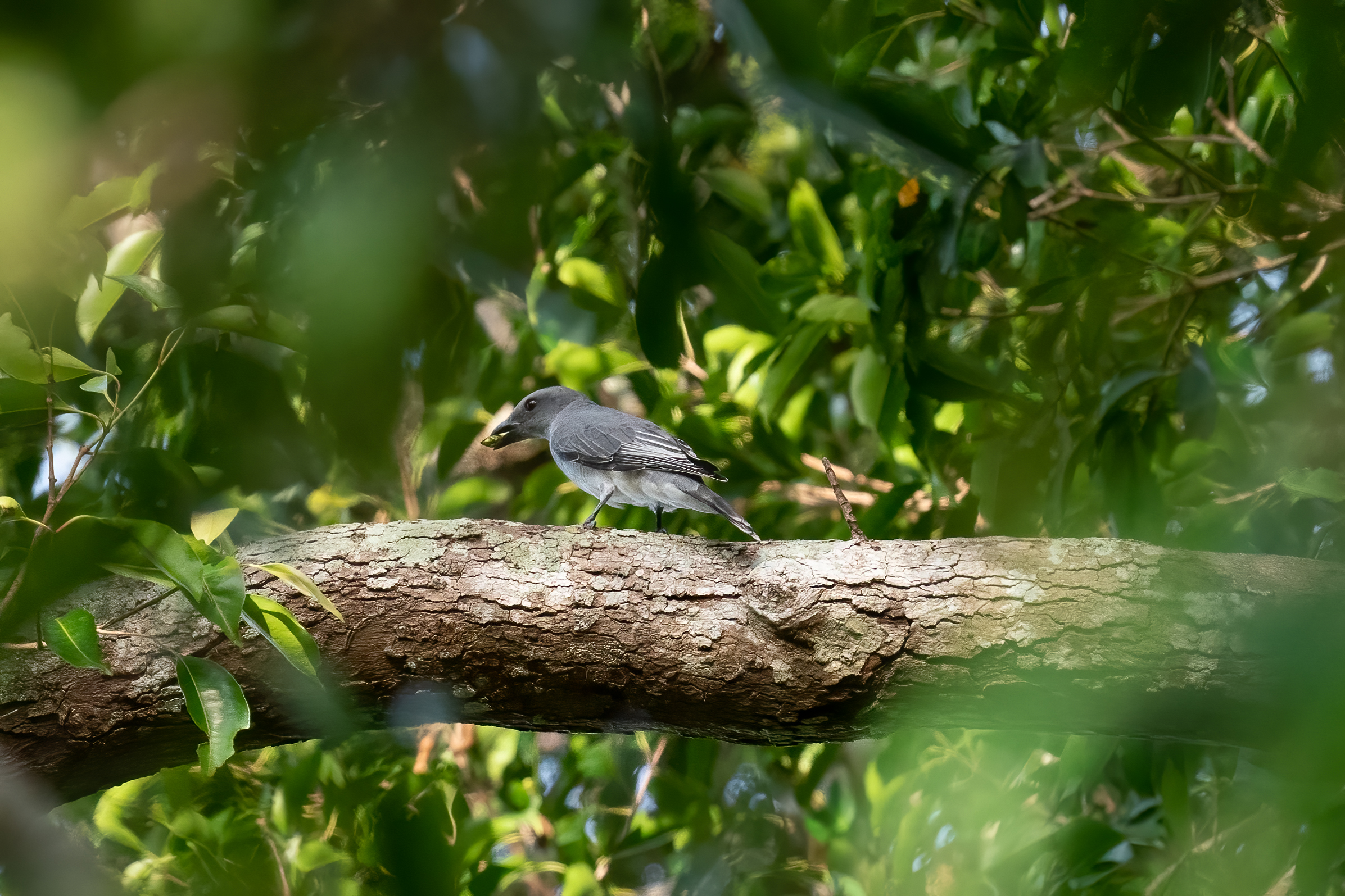
Javan cuckooshrike

Mammals

Mammals include the banteng, rusa deer, Indian muntjac, Javan lutung, wild boar, large flying fox, leopard cat and East Javan langur (also called black monkey, Trachypithecus auratus ssp kohlbruggei).

Mammals

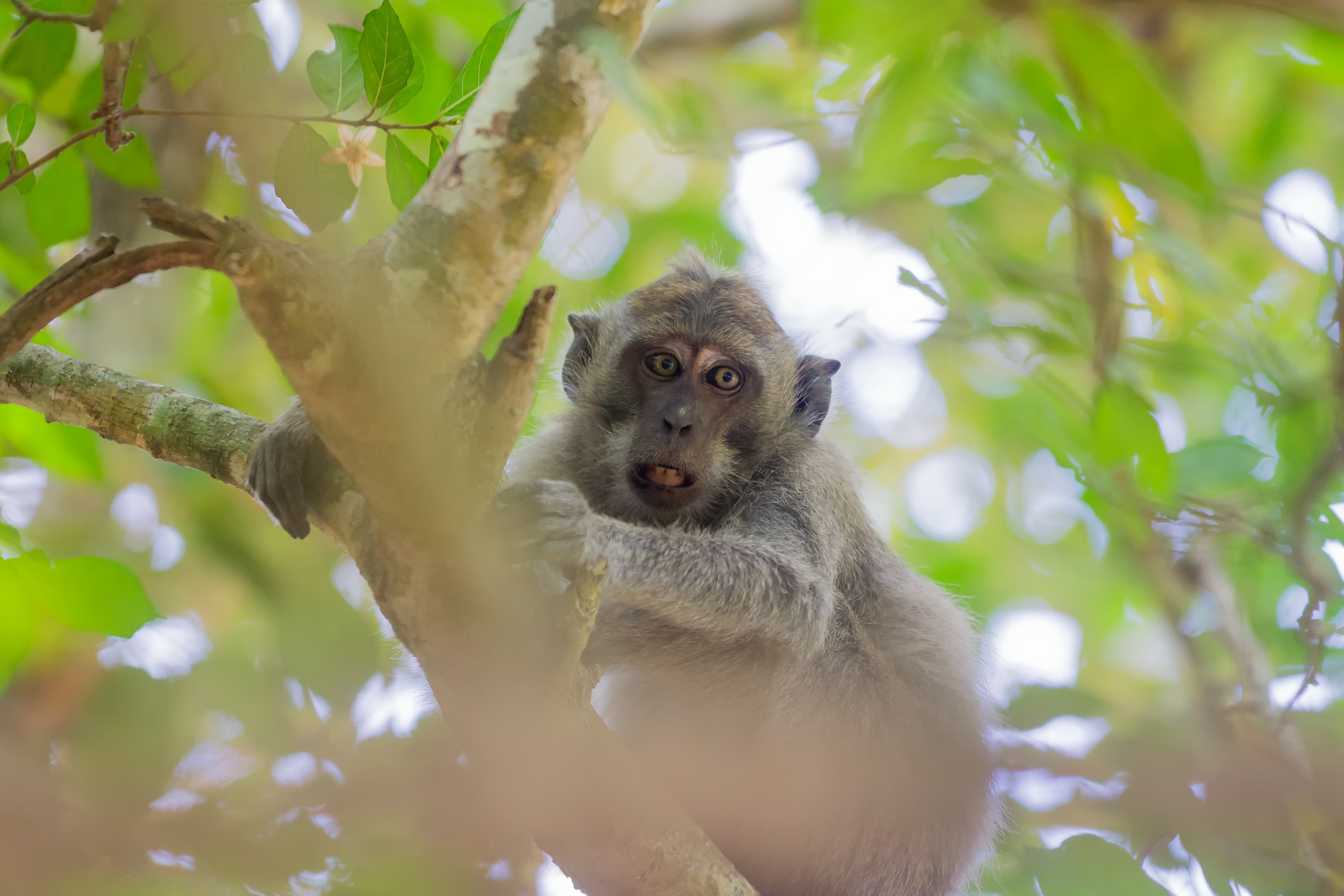
Long tailed macaque

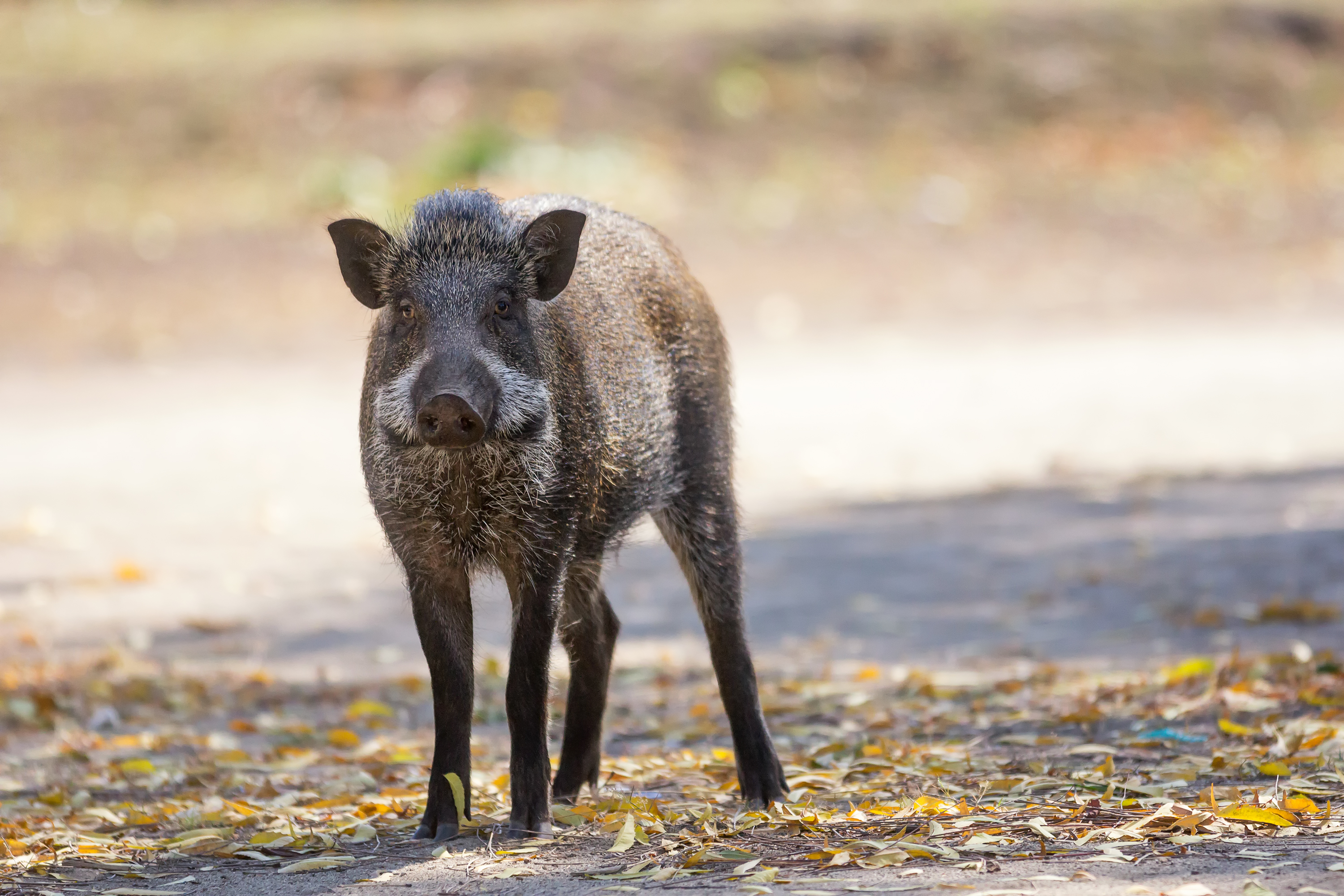
Wild boar

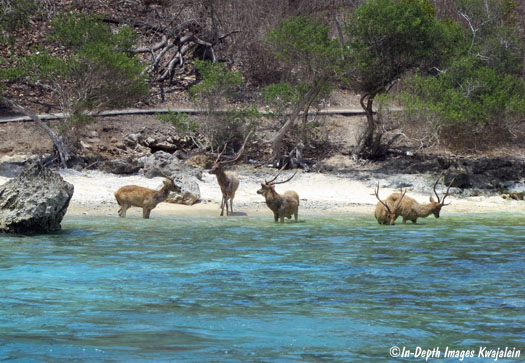
Javan rusa (Rusa timorensis) on Menjangan Island

Marine species

These include reptiles such as hawksbill turtle and water monitor.

The marine area is rich of over 110 species of corals from 18 families, with 22 species of the mushroom coral family and 27 species of Acropora coral.

Marine life

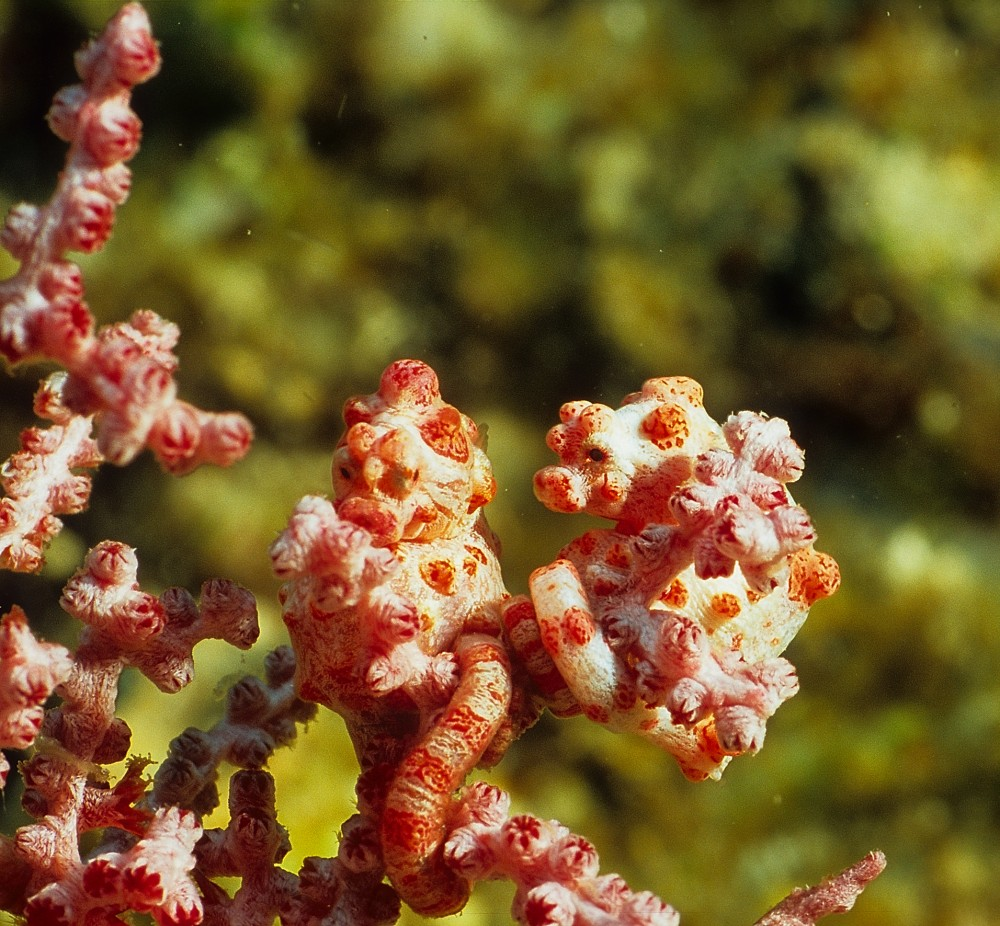
Well camouflaged pair of Denise's pygmy seahorses

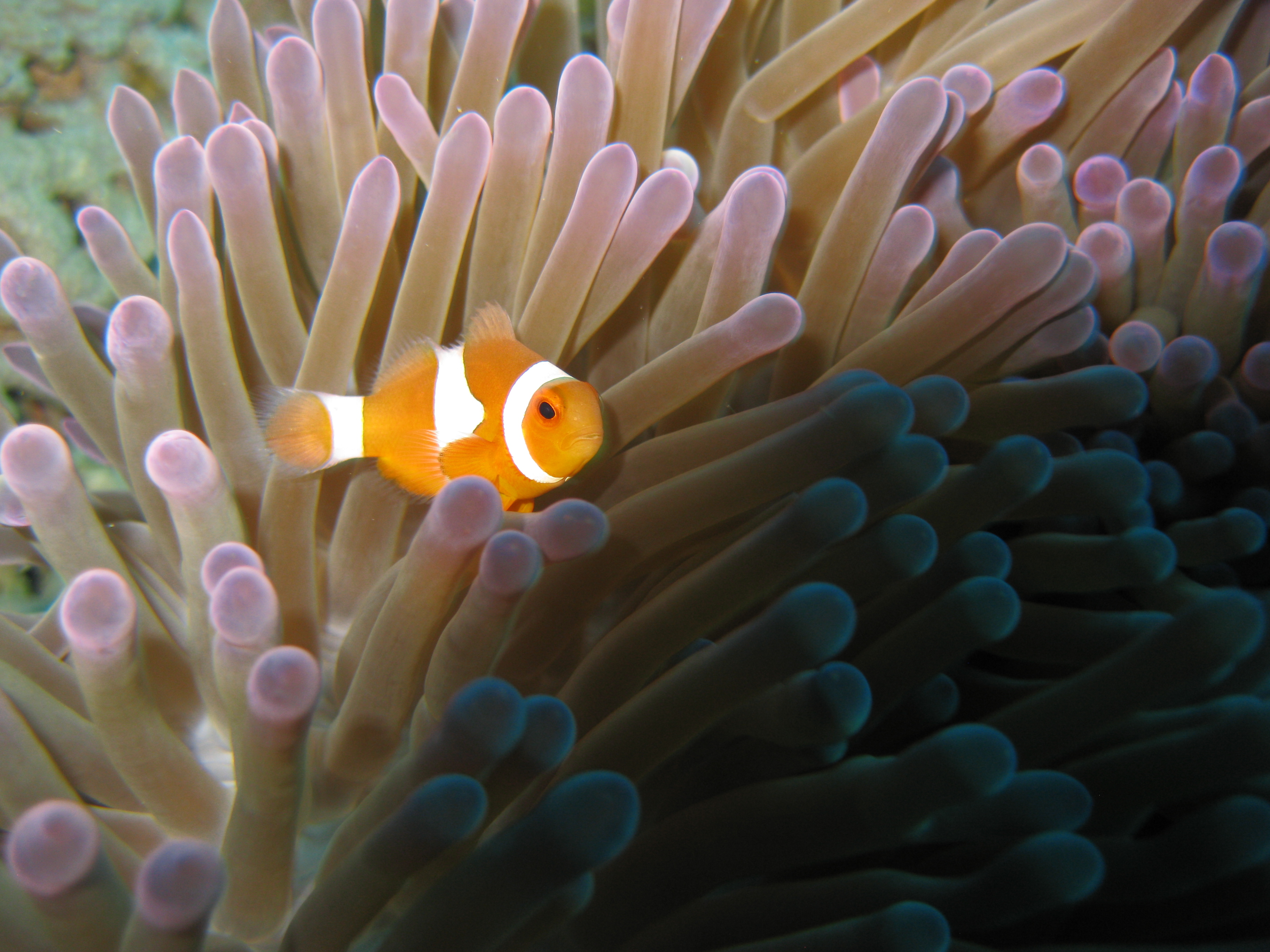

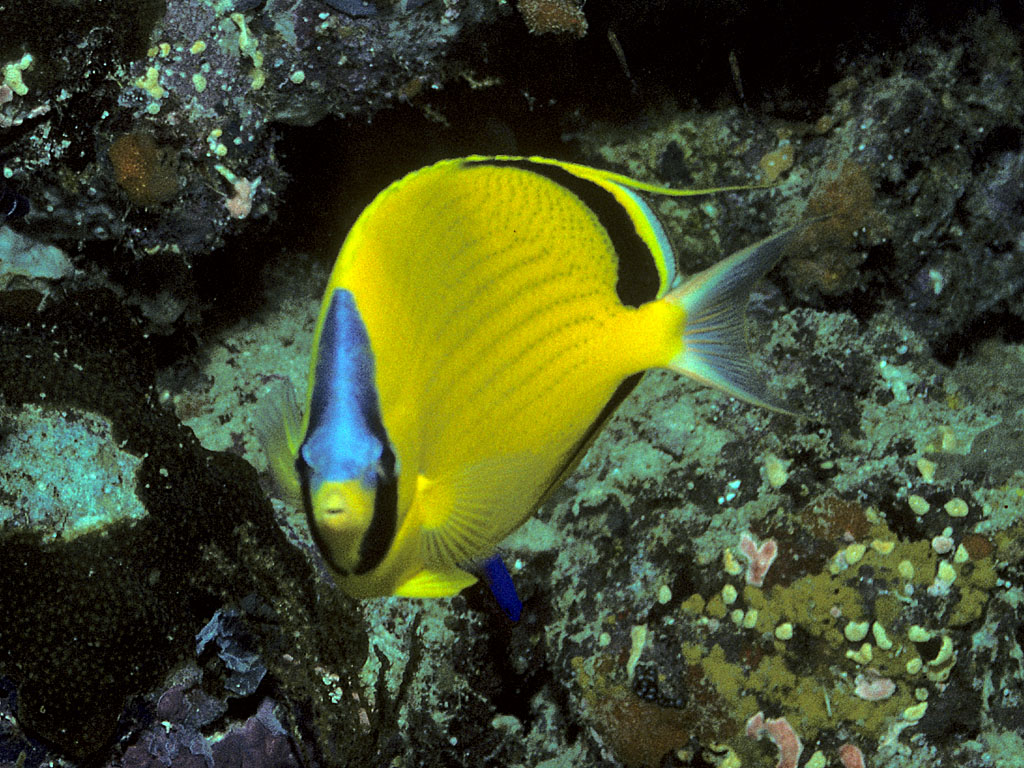

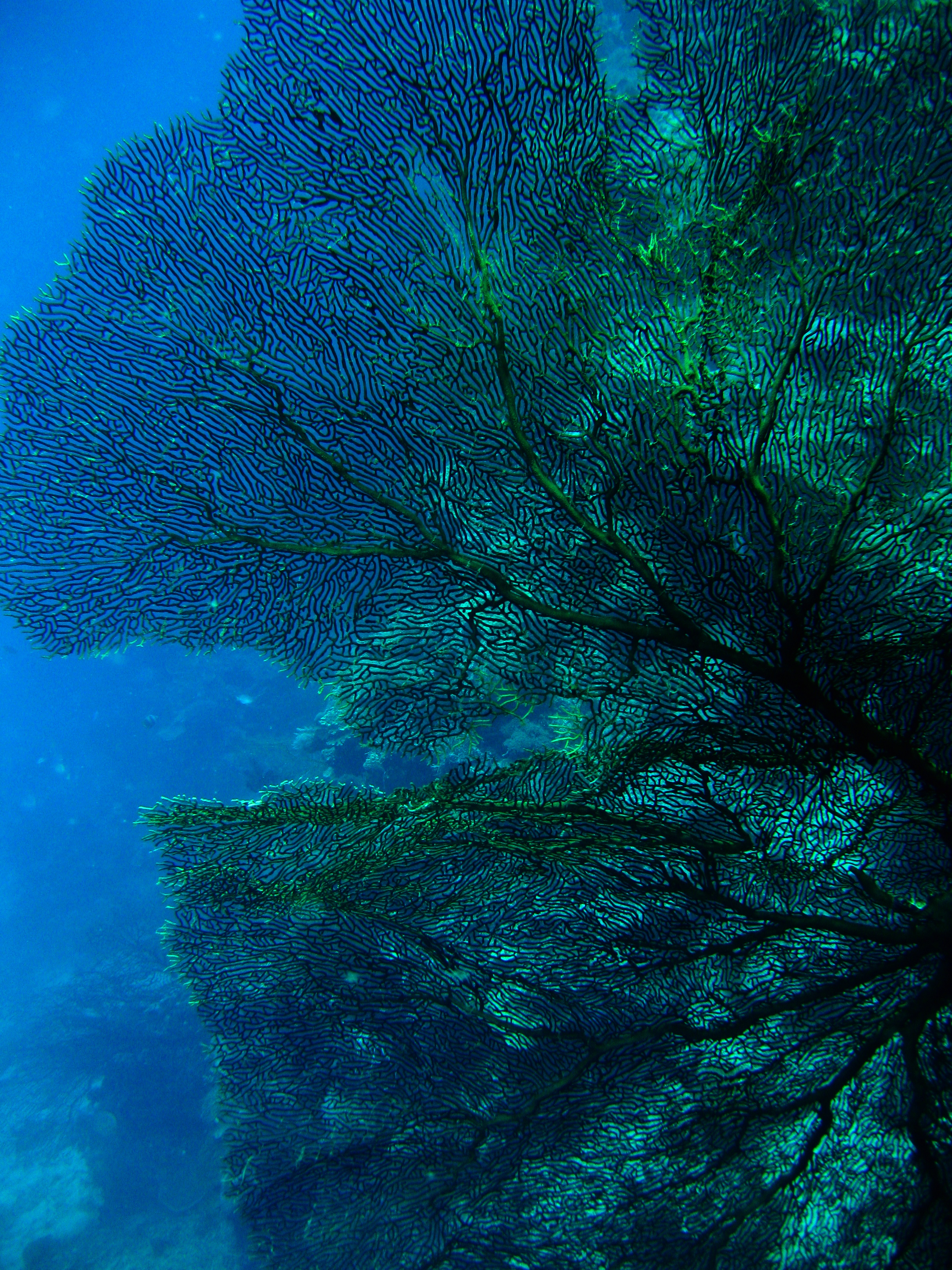
Sea fan

=== Flora ===
Plant species known to grow in this national park include Pterospermum diversifolium, Antidesma bunius, Lagerstroemia speciosa, Steleochocarpus burahol, Santalum album, Aleurites moluccanus, Sterculia foetida, Schleichera oleosa, Dipterocarpus hasseltii, Garcinia dulcis, Alstonia scholaris, Manilkara kauki, Dalbergia latifolia and Cassia fistula.

=== Extinct ===
- The last positive record of Bali tigers were in the 1930s in western Bali.
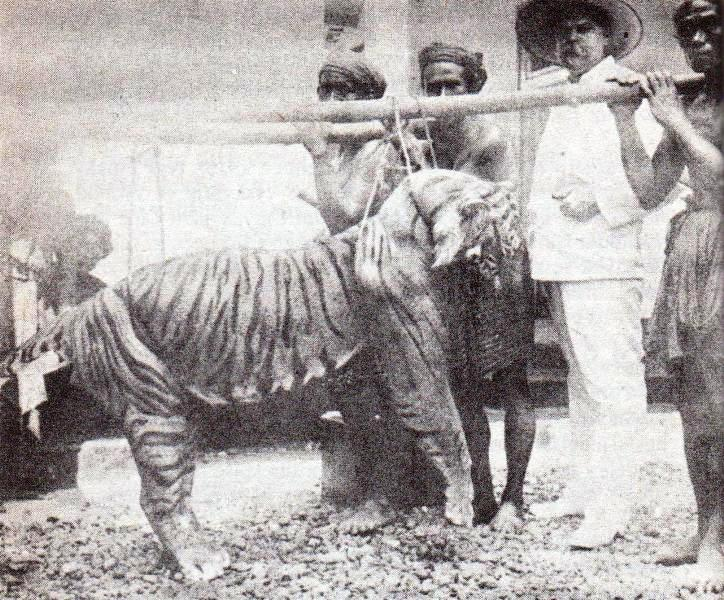
A Bali tiger killed by M. Zanveld in the 1920s

== Tourism ==
The Bali Tower Bistro in the Menjangan resort boasts a five-story wooden structure (the Tower) that rises above the trees' canopy tree line; the top floors offer a 360° panoramic view over the park.

== See also ==
=== Bibliography ===
- Amarasinghe, A. A. Thasun; Putra, Chairunas Adha; Henkanaththegedara, Sujan; Dwiyahreni, Asri (May 2021). "Herpetofaunal diversity of West Bali National Park, Indonesia with identification of indicator species for long-term monitoring". Global Ecology and Conservation (includes a map of types of vegetation). 28 (1) e01638. Bibcode:2021GEcoC..2801638A. doi:10.1016/j.gecco.2021.e01638.
- Fanina, Jean-Jacques; Budiharjo, Agung; Komariah, Komariah (January 2016). "Climate change impacts on Bali myna (Leucopsar rothschildi) during the last decade (case study: West Bali National Park)". Proceeding of International Conference on Climate Change 2016 (includes a map of types of vegetation, slightly different to the one in Amarasinghe et al. 2021): 181–195.
- Febrianti, Mutia Ismi; Purwanti, Frida; Hartoko, Agus (June 2018). "Analysis of the Coral Reef Ecosystem Exposure Caused by Tourism in Menjangan Island, West Bali National Park". Jurnal Ilmu Dan Teknologi Kelautan Tropis (in Indonesian). 10 (1): 15. doi:10.29244/jitkt.v10i1.19236.
- Sunarta, I Nyoman (2015). "Local Community Participation in the Development of Ecological Tourism in West Bali National Park". e-Journal of Tourism. 2 (2): 55–61 – via Academia.edu.
- Tito, C. K.; Ampou, E. E.; Wibawa, T. A. (2019). "Stressor-Response of Reef-Building Corals to Climate Change in the Menjangan Island, West Bali National Park, Indonesia". IOP Conference Series: Earth and Environmental Science. 246 (1) 012011. Bibcode:2019E&ES..246a2011T. doi:10.1088/1755-1315/246/1/012011.

=== Related articles ===
- Geography of Indonesia

=== External links ===
- "Best Trails in West Bali National Park". alltrails.com.
