= Surabaya Zoo =

Zoo in Surabaya, Indonesia

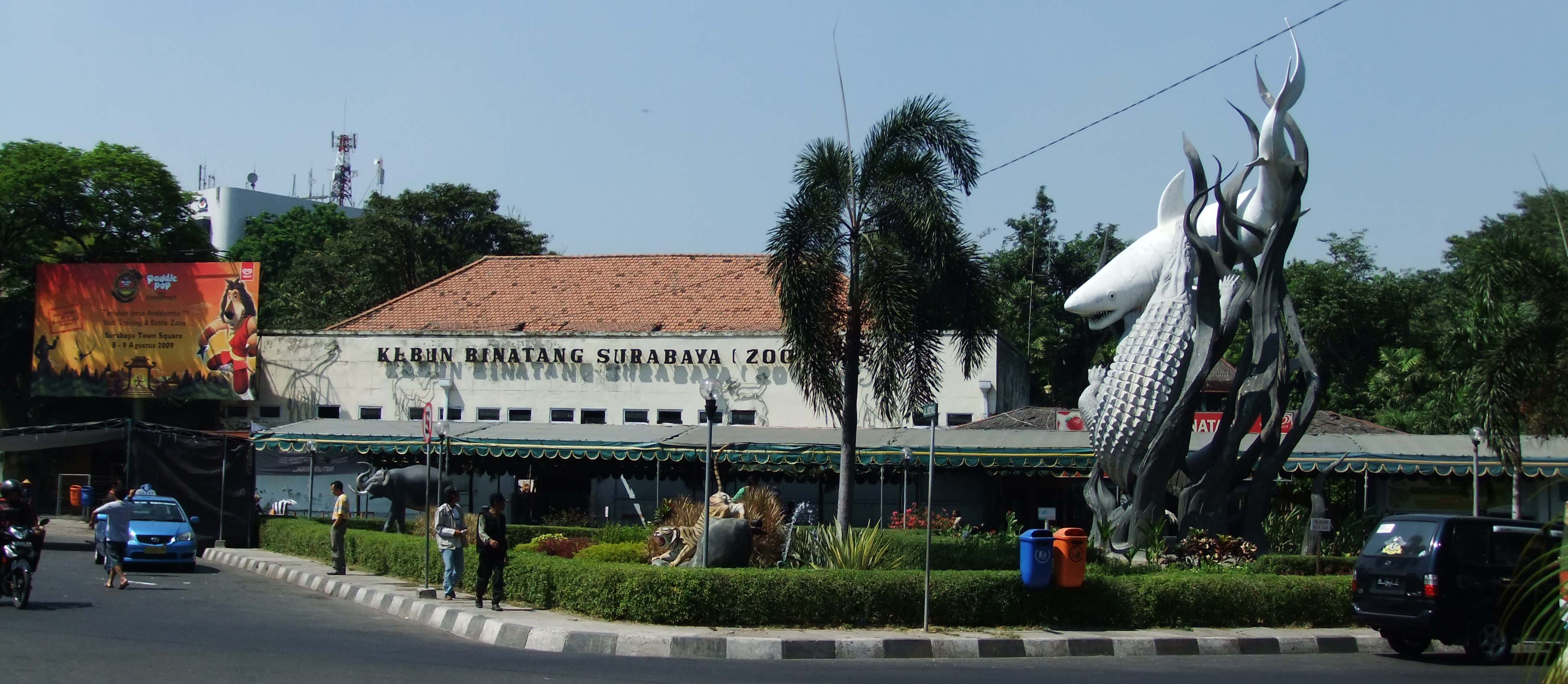
- Surabaya Zoo
- Interactive map of Surabaya Zoo
- 7°17′45″S 112°44′10″E
- Date opened: April 1918
- Location: Jalan Setail 1, Surabaya, East Java
- Land area: 15 ha (37 acres)
- No. of animals: almost 3,500 (2014)
- No. of species: almost 200 (2014)
- Website: www.surabayazoo.com

Surabaya Zoo (Indonesian: Kebun Binatang Surabaya; sometimes abbreviated as KBS and Bonbin), is a 15-hectare (37-acre) zoo located in the city of Surabaya in East Java.

== History ==
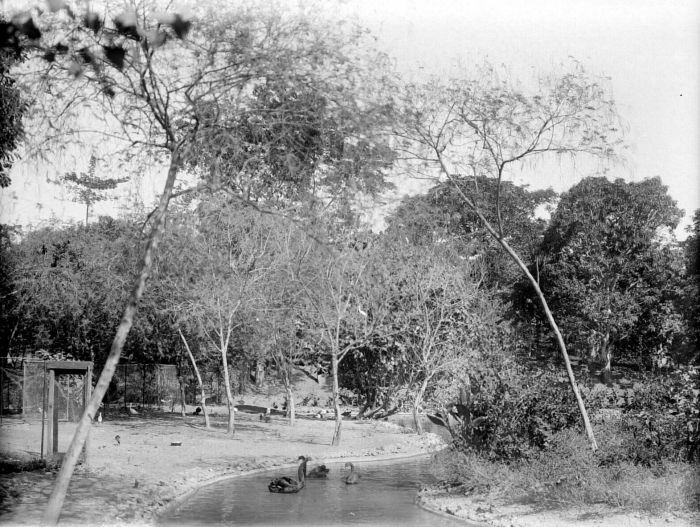
A pond with Australian black swans in Surabaya Botanical Garden and Zoo in 1931

Surabaya Zoo was established by decree of the Governor General of the Netherlands East Indies on 31 August 1916 as Soerabaiasche Planten-en Dierentuin on the merit of the journalist H. F. K. Kommer who had the hobby of collecting animals.

In 1916, the first Surabaya Zoo was established in Kaliondo. On 28 September 1917, the zoo was moved to Groedo Road. In April 1918, Surabaya Zoo sold tickets to enter the zoo.

In 1920, the zoo was transferred to another new location in the Darmo area, on a plot of land measuring 30,500 m2 belonging to the Oost-Java Stoomtram Maatschappij (steam tramway company of East Java). On 21 July 1922, the zoo experienced its first financial crisis and there was a plan to disestablish the zoo, but the decision was not agreed by the Surabaya municipality at that time. On 11 May 1923, it was decided to establish a new association for the zoo. W. A. Hompes was chosen to replace J.P. Mooyman, one of the early founders of the zoo. In 1927, the zoo was financially aided by the mayor of Surabaya, Dijkerman. With the help of the People's Representative Council of Surabaya, on 3 July 1927, a new plot of land was bought for Surabaya Zoo, measuring 32,000 m2, from a plot of land owned by the steam tramway company of East Java.

From 1939 until now, the size of the zoo has expanded to 15 hectares.

In August–November 1987 the breeding facility in Surabaya Zoo was renovated. This facility comprised 29 aviaries with 16 endangered Bali starlings, found only in the western part of Bali island. In November 1987, the captive population was increased with the addition of 37 birds donated by zoos and private collections in the US and by Jersey Wildlife Preservation Trust. The success of the breeding program of the Bali starling at this zoo allowed the release of 40 starlings into the wild at West Bali National Park in June 2011.

== Controversy ==
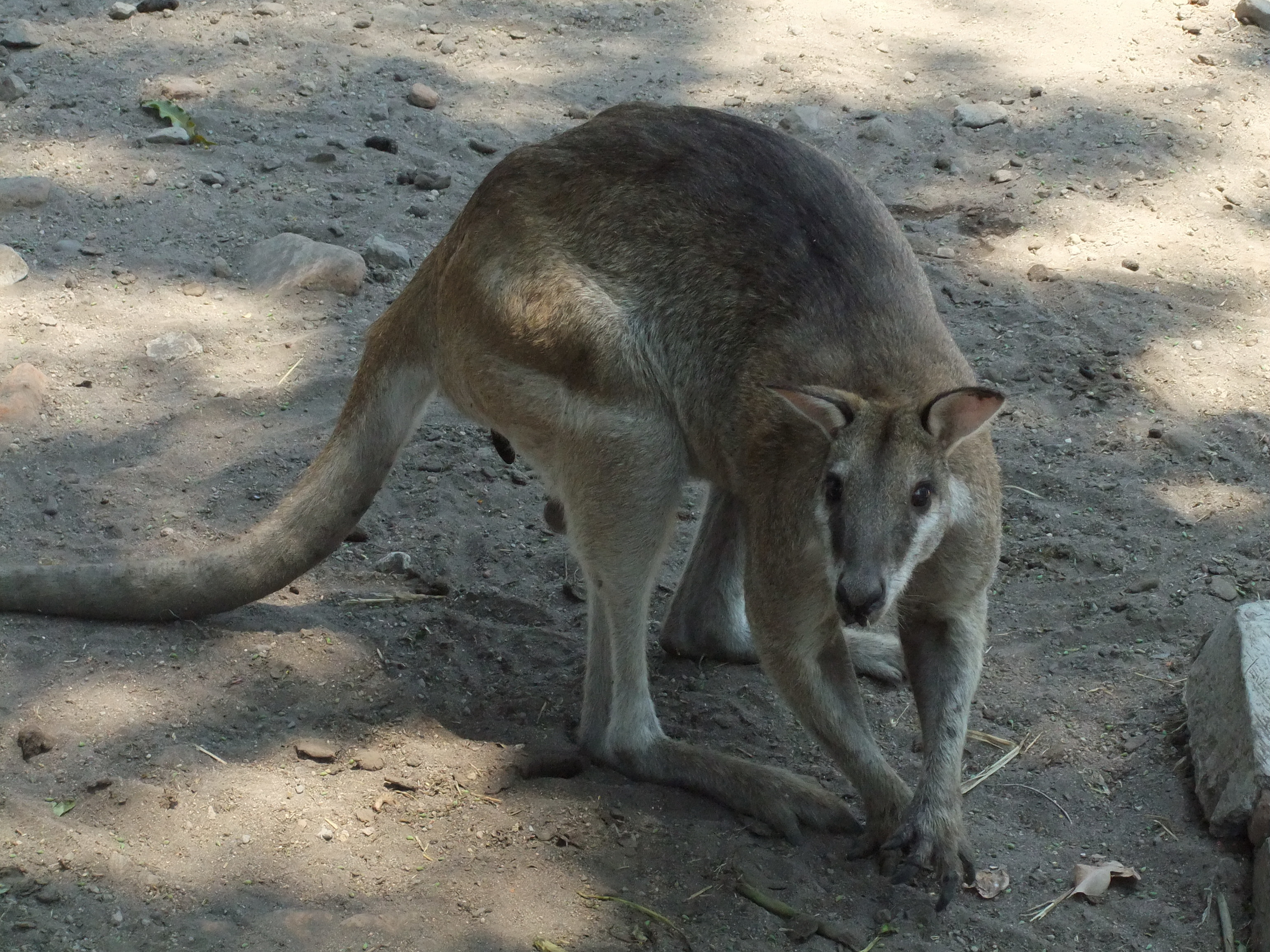
Agile Wallaby in the Surabaya Zoo

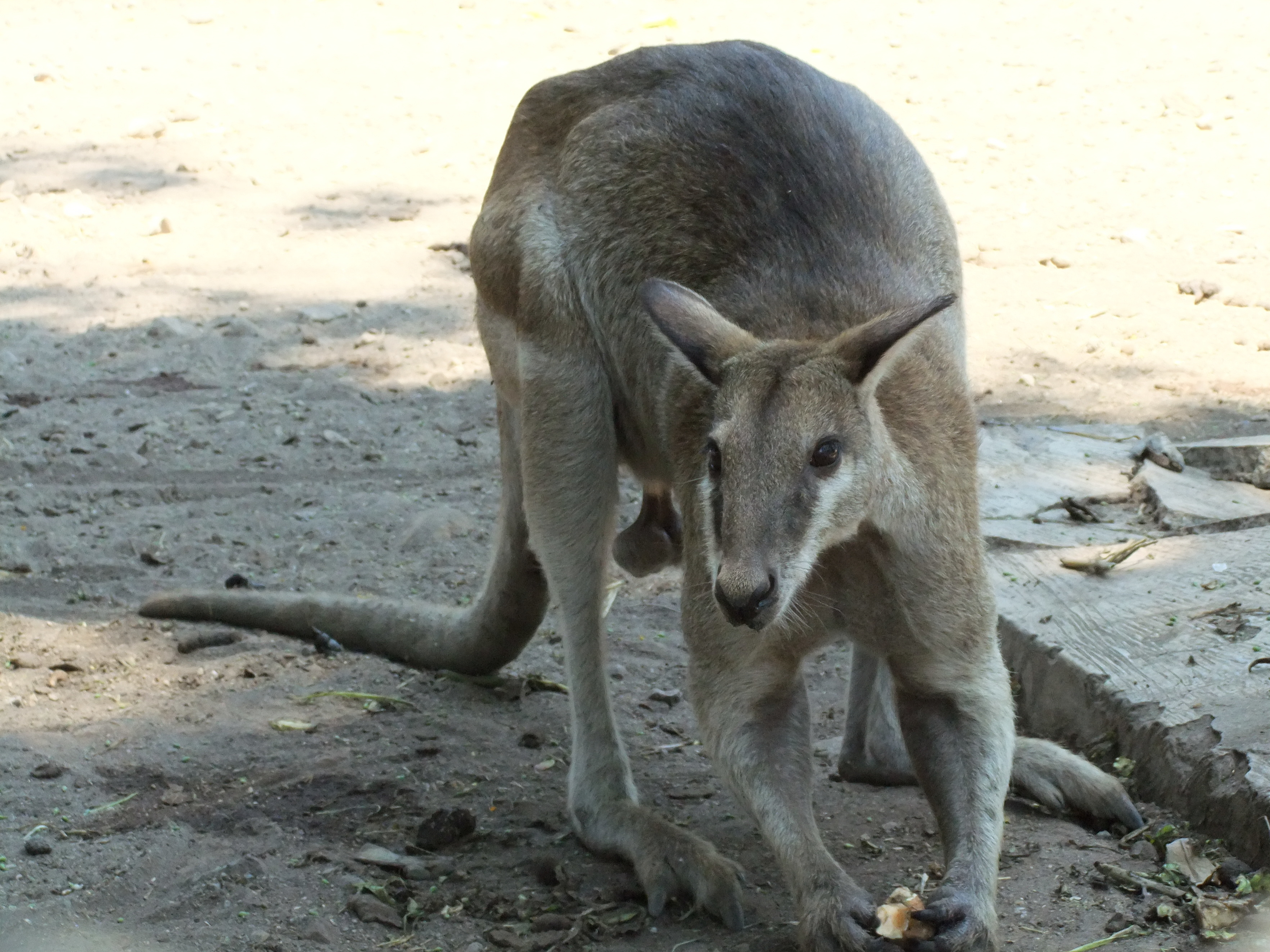
Agile Wallaby in the Surabaya Zoo

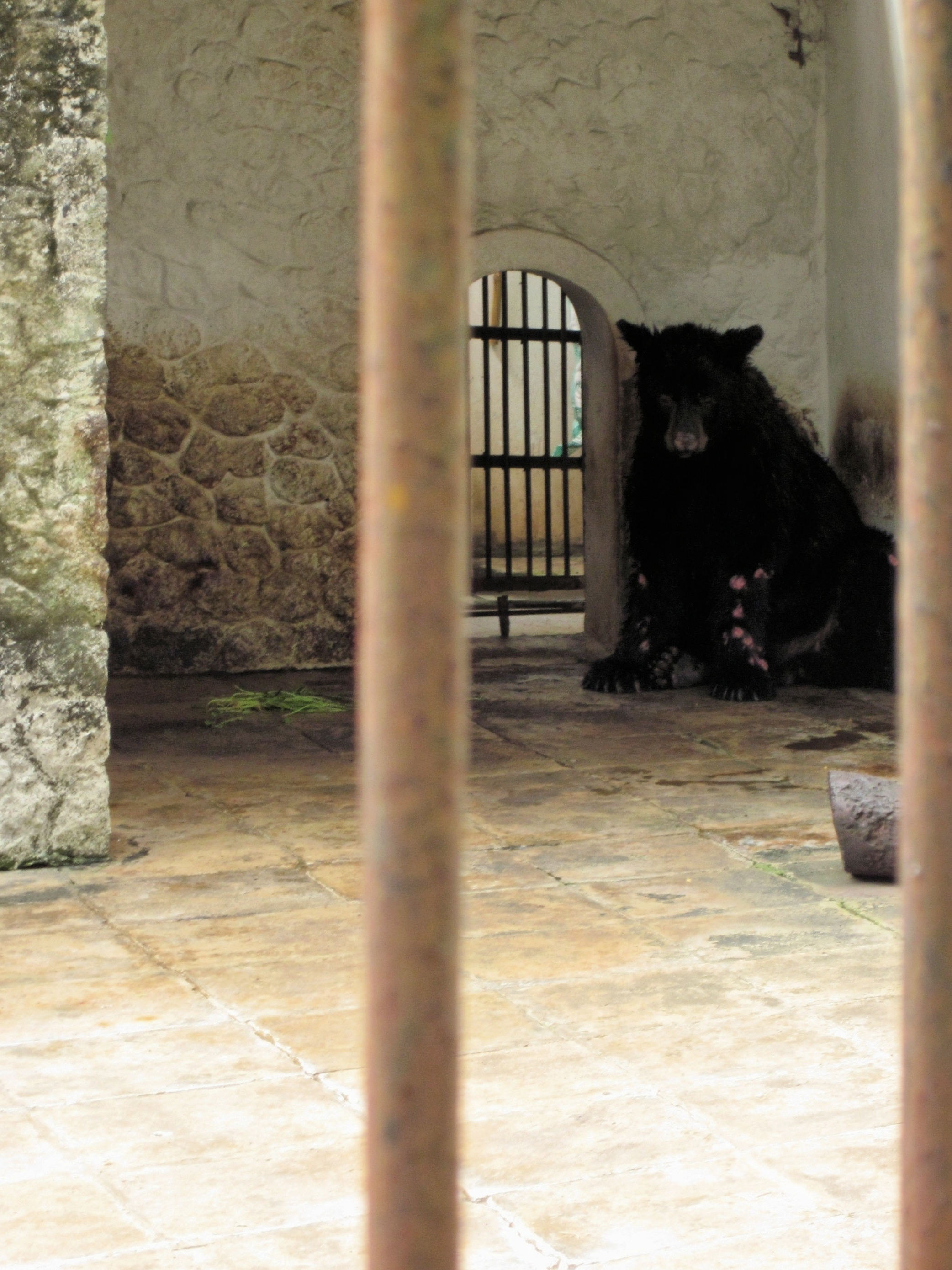
This American black bear in Surabaya Zoo suffers from skin disease common among captive bears not properly cared for.

The Surabaya Zoo has received complaints about its treatment of animals from activist groups such as the Jakarta Animal Aid Network (JAAN), as well as from the interim administrator of the zoo. The situation reached a point in 2010 where The Jakarta Post called the facility the 'Surabaya Zoo of Death'. In August 2010, the Forestry Ministry revoked Surabaya Zoo's license following several animal deaths, including a rare Sumatran tiger, African lion, wallaby, Komodo dragon, babirusa, Bawean deer, and crocodile. Interim management asked the local police and the East Java Natural Resources Conservation Agency (BKSDA) to conduct an investigation, which found that negligent keepers were to blame for most of the animal deaths. The Temporary Management Team transferred 378 animals from the zoo to 6 conservation organizations. However, several of the animals were in bad condition and eventually died. An autopsy performed on the animals found plastic and wood inside the animals. The death of Melani the tiger, one of only a few hundred Sumatran tigers left in the world, outraged animal activists when it was discovered that the tiger was suffering from extreme digestive disorders before being rescued from the zoo.

On 2 March 2012, a giraffe died from ingesting plastic thrown by some visitors.

On 28 January 2014 Surabaya Zoo authority announced that the zoo had a collection of 3,459 animals from 197 species, but 81 animals were sick, disabled, and old, and 44 were in severe conditions.

An online petition that calls for the closure of Surabaya Zoo due to continued mistreatment of animals reached 885,000 signatures before closing in late 2016.

== Komodo dragon exhibit ==
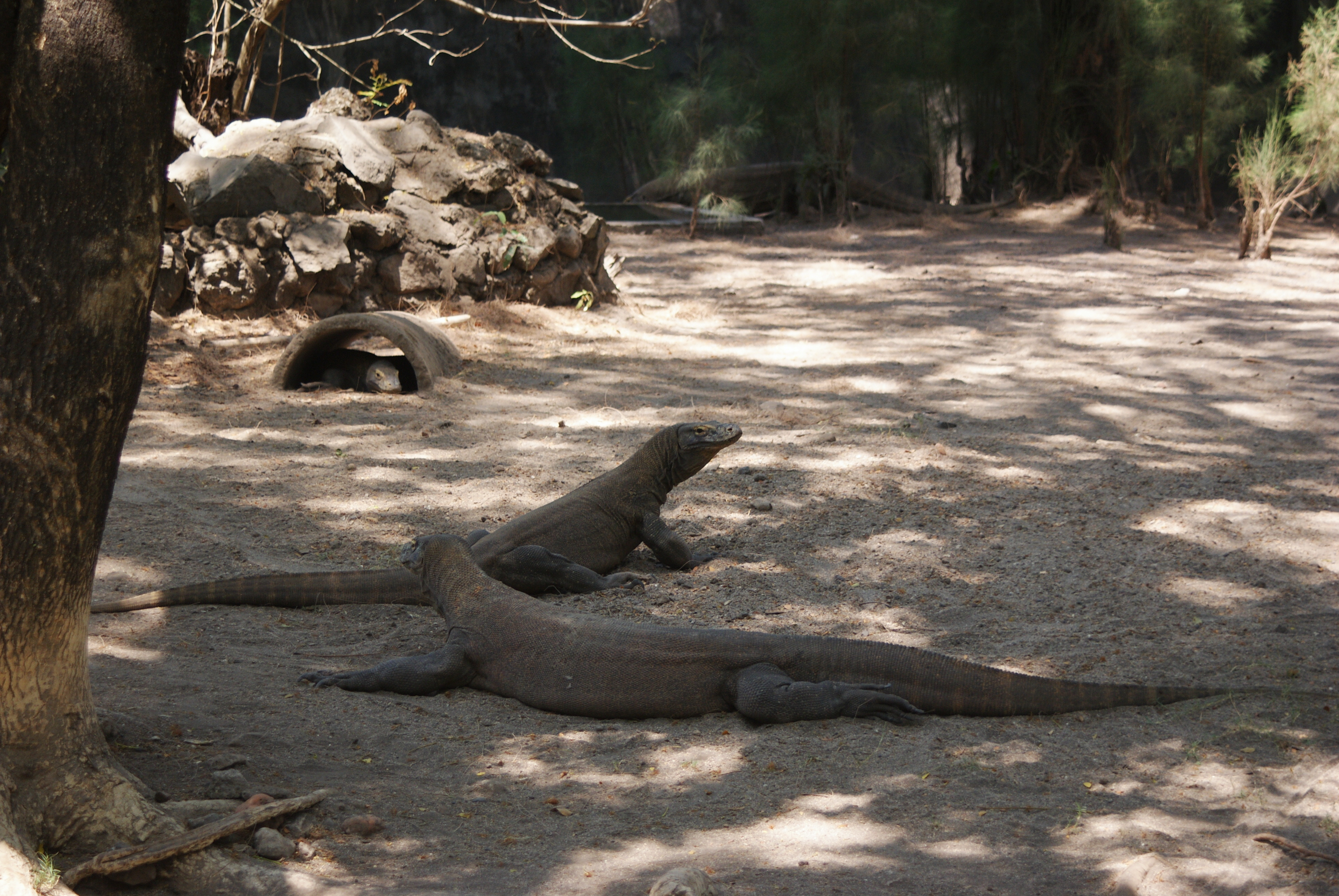
Komodo Dragons in the Surabaya Zoo

As of March 2018, Surabaya Zoo had 76 Komodo dragons, 13 of which were less than a year old, with more expected after the laying of a dozen eggs a few months earlier. To deal with the likely overpopulation, the Surabaya authority planned to build a dragon park in the Kenjeran coastal area, this being less expensive than attempting to release the dragons into the wild.
