= List of districts in Bali =

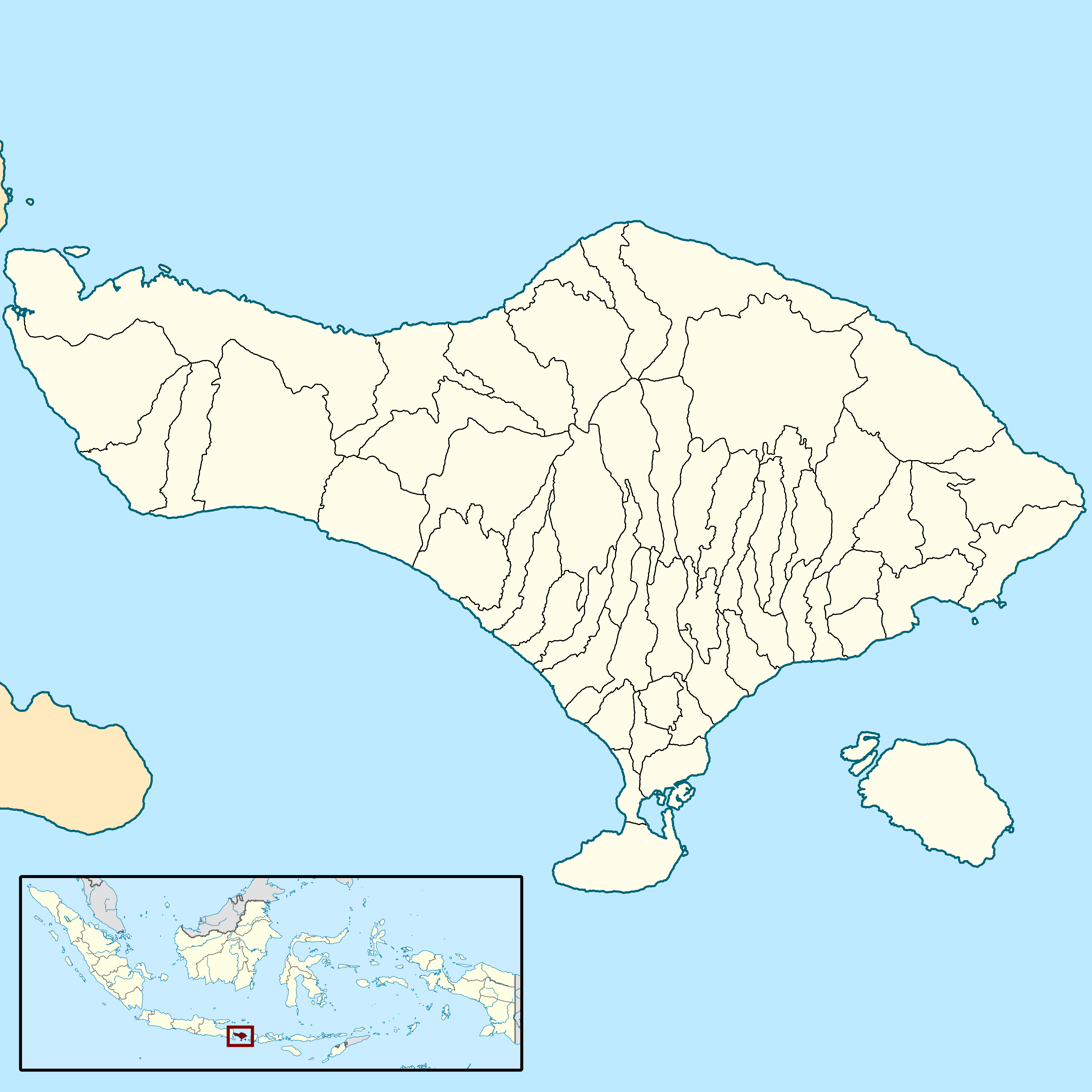
Map of districts

The province of Bali in Indonesia is divided into kabupaten or regencies, which in turn are divided administratively into districts, known as kecamatan. The province of Bali is divided into 8 kabupaten plus 1 independent city (kota), together divided into 57 kecamatan, in turn sub-divided into 80 urban villages (kelurahan) and 636 rural villages (desa). At the 2020 Census, the population was 4,317,404 people in a total area of 5,780.06 km².

No.	Code Kemendagri	Regency or City	Area (km²)	Population (2020)	Density (people/km²)	Comprises		
No.	Code Kemendagri	Regency or City	Area (km²)	Population (2020)	Density (people/km²)	District	Urban village	Rural village
1	51.03	Badung Regency	418.62	548,191	1,309.52	6	16	46
2	51.06	Bangli Regency	490.71	258,191	526.16	4	4	68
3	51.08	Buleleng Regency	1,364.73	791,813	580.20	9	19	129
4	51.04	Gianyar Regency	368.00	515,344	1,403.11	7	6	64
5	51,01	Jembrana Regency	841.80	317,064	376.65	5	10	41
6	51.07	Karangasem Regency	839.54	492,402	586.51	8	3	75
7	51.05	Klungkung Regency	315.00	206,925	656.90	4	6	53
8	51.02	Tabanan Regency	1,013.88	461,630	455.32	10	-	133
9	51.71	Denpasar City	127.78	725,314	5,676.27	4	16	27
	Total Bali		5,780.06	4,317,404	746.95	57	80	636

== Badung Regency ==
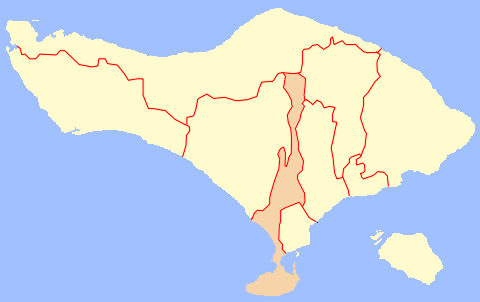
Map of Badung Regency in Bali

Map of districts in Badung Regency

List of districts and villages in Badung Regency as follows:

Code	Districts	Urban villages	Rural villages	Status	List
51.03.03	Abiansemal	-	18	Rural villages	Abiansemal; Angantaka; Ayunan; Blahkiuh; Bongkasa; Bongkasa Pertiwi; Darmasaba; Dauh Yeh Cani; Jagapati; Mambal; Mekar Bhuana; Punggul; Sangeh; Sedang; Selat; Sibang Gede; Sibang Kaja; Taman
51.03.01	Kuta	5	-	Urban villages	Kedonganan; Tuban; Kuta; Legian; Seminyak
51.03.05	South Kuta	3	3	Rural villages	Pecatu; Ungasan; Kutuh
51.03.05	South Kuta	3	3	Urban villages	Benoa; Tanjung Benoa; Jimbaran
51.03.06	North Kuta	3	3	Rural villages	Canggu; Dalung; Tibubeneng
51.03.06	North Kuta	3	3	Urban villages	Kerobokan; Kerobokan Kelod; Kerobokan Kaja
51.03.02	Mengwi	5	15	Rural villages	Baha; Buduk; Cemagi; Gulingan; Kekeran; Kuwum; Mengwi; Mengwitani; Munggu; Penarungan; Pererenan; Sembung; Sobangan; Tumbak Bayuh; Werdi Bhuwana
51.03.02	Mengwi	5	15	Urban villages	Abianbase; Kapal; Lukluk; Sading; Sempidi
51.03.04	Petang		7	Rural villages	Belok; Carangsari; Getasan; Pangsan; Pelaga; Petang; Sulangai
	TOTAL	16	46		

== Bangli Regency ==
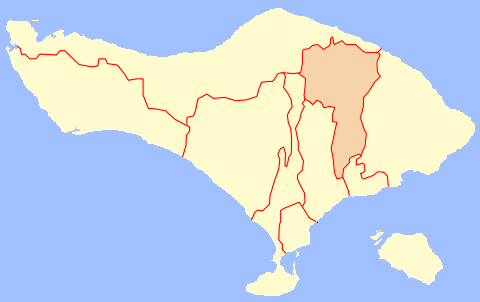
Map of Bangli Regency in Bali

Map of districts in Bangli Regency

List of districts and villages in Bangli Regency as follows:

Code	Districts	Urban villages	Rural villages	Status	List
51.06.02	Bangli	4	5	Rural villages	Bunutin; Kayubihi; Landih; Pengotan; Taman Bali
51.06.02	Bangli	4	5	Urban villages	Bebalang; Cempaga; Kawan; Kubu
51.06.04	Kintamani	-	48	Rural villages	Abangsongan; Abuan; Awan; Bantang; Banua; Batudinding; Batukaang; Batur Selatan; Batur Tengah; Batur Utara; Bayungcerik; Bayung Gede; Belancan; Belandingan; Belanga; Belantih; Binyan; Bonyoh; Buahan; Bunutin; Catur; Daup; Dausa; Gunungbau; Katung; Kedisan; Kintamani; Kutuh; Langgahan; Lembean; Mangguh; Manikliyu; Mengani; Pengejaran; Pinggan; Satra; Sekaan; Sekardadi; Selulung; Serai; Siakin; Songan A; Songan B; Subaya; Sukawana; Suter; Terunyan; Ulian
51.06.01	Susut	-	9	Rural villages	Abuan; Apuan; Demulih; Pengiangan; Penglumbaran; Selat; Sulahan; Susut; Tiga
51.06.03	Tembuku	-	6	Rural villages	Bangbang; Jehem; Peninjoan; Tembuku; Undisan; Yangapi
	TOTAL	4	68		

== Buleleng Regency ==
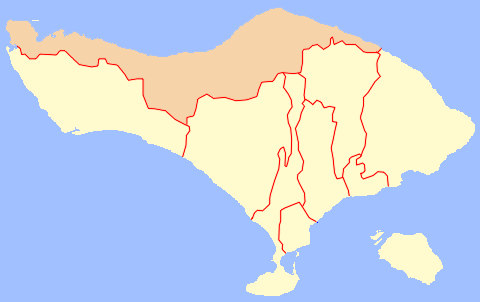
Map of Buleleng Regency in Bali

Map of districts in Buleleng Regency

List of districts and villages in Buleleng Regency as follows:

Code	Districts	Urban villages	Rural villages	Status	List
51.08.04	Banjar	-	17	Desa	Banjar; Banjar Tegeha; Banyuatis; Banyuseri; Cempaga; Dencarik; Gesing; Gobleg; Kaliasem; Kayuputih; Munduk; Pedawa; Sidetapa; Tampekan; Temukus; Tigawasa; Tirtasari
51.08.06	Buleleng	17	12	Desa	Alasangker; Anturan; Bakti Seraga; Jinengdalem; Kalibukbuk; Nagasepaha; Pemaron; Penglatan; Petandakan; Poh Bergong; Sari Mekar; Tukadmungga
51.08.06	Buleleng	17	12	Kelurahan	Astina; Banjar Bali; Banjar Jawa; Banjar Tegal; Banyuasri; Banyuning; Beratan; Kaliuntu; Kampung Anyar; Kampung Baru; Kampung Bugis; Kampung Kajanan; Kampung Singaraja; Kendran; Liligundi; Paket Agung; Penarukan
51.08.03	Busung Biu	-	15	Desa	Bengkel; Bongancina; Busung Biu; Kedis; Kekeran; Pelapuan; Pucaksari; Sepang; Sepang Kelod; Subuk; Telaga; Tinggarsari; Tista; Titab; Umejero
51.08.01	Gerokgak	-	14	Desa	Banyupoh; Celukanbawang; Gerokgak; Musi; Patas; Pejarakan; Pemuteran; Pengulon; Penyabangan; Sanggalangit; Sumberklampok; Sumberkima; Tinga-Tinga; Tukadsumaga
51.08.08	Kubutambahan	-	13	Desa	Bengkala; Bila; Bontihing; Bukti; Bulian; Depeha; Kubutambahan; Mengening; Pakisan; Tajun; Tambakan; Tamblang; Tunjung
51.08.07	Sawan	-	14	Desa	Bebetin; Bungkulan; Galungan; Giri Emas; Jagaraga; Kerobokan; Lemukih; Menyali; Sangsit; Sawan; Sekumpul; Sinabun; Sudaji; Suwug
51.08.02	Seririt	1	20	Desa	Banjar Asem; Bestala; Bubunan; Gunungsari; Joanyar; Kalianget; Kalisada; Lokapaksa; Mayong; Munduk Bestala; Pangkung Paruk; Patemon; Pengastulan; Rangdu; Ringdikit; Sulanyah; Tangguwisia; Ularan; Umeanyar; Unggahan
51.08.02	Seririt	1	20	Kelurahan	Seririt
51.08.05	Sukasada	1	14	Desa	Ambengan; Git Git; Kayu Putih; Padang Bulia; Pancasari; Panji; Panji Anom; Pegadungan; Pegayaman; Sambangan; Selat; Silangjana; Tegal Linggah; Wanagiri
51.08.05	Sukasada	1	14	Kelurahan	Sukasada
51.08.09	Tejakula	-	10	Desa	Bondalem; Julah; Les; Madenan; Pacung; Penuktukan; Sambirenteng; Sembiran; Tejakula; Tembok
	TOTAL	19	129		

== Gianyar Regency ==
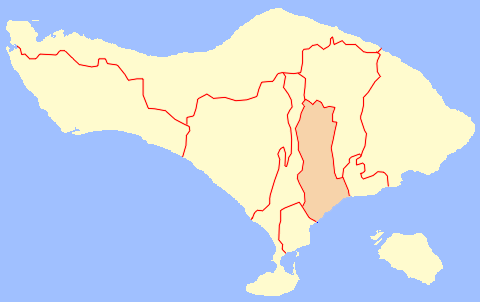
Map of Gianyar Regency in Bali

Map of districts in Gianyar Regency

List of districts and villages in Gianyar Regency as follows:

Code	Districts	Urban villages	Rural Villages	Status	List
51.04.02	Blahbatuh	-	9	Desa	Bedulu; Belega; Blahbatuh; Bona; Buruan; Keramas; Medahan; Pering; Saba
51.04.03	Gianyar	5	12	Desa	Bakbakan; Lebih; Petak; Petak Kaja; Serongga; Siangan; Sidan; Sumita; Suwat; Tegal Tugu; Temesi; Tulikup
51.04.03	Gianyar	5	12	Kelurahan	Abianbase; Beng; Bitera; Gianyar; Samplangan
51.04.07	Payangan	-	9	Desa	Bresela; Buahan; Buahan Kaja; Bukian; Kelusa; Kerta; Melinggih; Melinggih Kelod; Puhu
51.04.01	Sukawati	-	12	Desa	Batuan; Batuan Kaler; Batubulan; Batubulan Kangin; Celuk; Guwang; Kemenuh; Ketewel; Singapadu; Singapadu Kaler; Singapadu Tengah; Sukawati
51.04.04	Tampaksiring	-	8	Desa	Manukaya; Pejeng; Pejeng Kaja; Pejeng Kangin; Pejeng Kawan; Pejeng Kelod; Sanding; Tampaksiring
51.04.06	Tegallalang	-	7	Desa	Kedisan; Keliki; Kendran; Pupuan; Sebatu; Taro; Tegallalang
51.04.05	Ubud	1	7	Desa	Kedewatan; Lodtunduh; Mas; Peliatan; Petulu; Sayan; Singakerta
51.04.05	Ubud	1	7	Kelurahan	Ubud
	TOTAL	6	64		

== Klungkung Regency ==
- Nusa Penida
- Klungkung
- Banjarkarangan
- Dukun

== Denpasar ==
Denpasar City comprises 4 districts (kecamatan), subdivided into 16 urban villages (kelurahan) and 27 rural villages (desa), for a total amount of 43 villages. In mid 2022, the population was officially estimated at 726,808 (comprising 366,953 males and 359,855 females) with its area being 125.98 km² and its density 5,769 people/km^{2}.

List of districts and villages in Denpasar City as follows:

Code	Districts	Urban villages	Rural villages	Total villages	Status	List
51.71.03	West Denpasar	3	8	11	Desa	Dauh Puri Kangin; Dauh Puri Kauh; Dauh Puri Klod; Padang Sambian Kaja; Padang Sambian Klod; Pemecutan Klod; Tegal Harum; Tegal Kerta
51.71.03	West Denpasar	3	8	11	Kelurahan	Dauh Puri; Padang Sambian; Pemecutan
51.71.01	South Denpasar	6	4	10	Desa	Pemogan; Sanur Kaja; Sanur Kauh; Sidakarya
51.71.01	South Denpasar	6	4	10	Kelurahan	Panjer; Pedungan; Renon; Sanur; Serangan; Sesetan
51.71.02	East Denpasar	4	7	11	Desa	Dangin Puri Klod; Kesiman Kertalangu; Kesiman Petilan; Penatih Dangin Puri; Sumerta Kaja; Sumerta Kauh; Sumerta Klod/Kelod
51.71.02	East Denpasar	4	7	11	Kelurahan	Dangin Puri; Kesiman; Penatih; Sumerta
51.71.04	North Denpasar	3	8	11	Desa	Dangin Puri Kaja; Dangin Puri Kangin; Dangin Puri Kauh; Dauh Puri Kaja; Peguyangan Kaja; Peguyangan Kangin; Pemecutan Kaja; Ubung Kaja
51.71.04	North Denpasar	3	8	11	Kelurahan	Peguyangan; Tonja; Ubung
	TOTAL	16	27	43		
