= List of districts and sub-districts in Buleleng Regency =

List of districts and sub-districts in Bali, Indonesia

The following is a list of districts and sub-districts in Buleleng Regency. Buleleng Regency has 9 districts, sub-divided into 19 urban villages (kelurahan) and 129 rural villages (desa). In mid 2022, the population was officially estimated at 825,141 (comprising 414,775 males and 410,366 females) in an area of 1,365.88 km^{2}, giving an average density of 604.1 people/km^{2}.

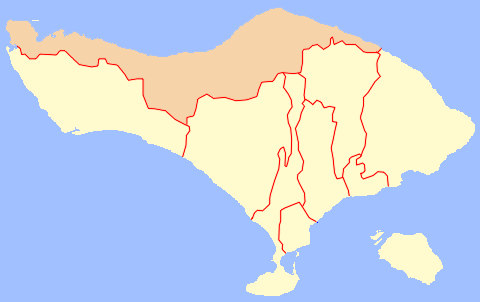
Map of Buleleng Regency in Bali

Map of districts in Buleleng Regency

List of districts and villages in Buleleng Regency as follows:

Code	Districts	Urban villages	Rural villages	Status	List
51.08.04	Banjar	-	17	Desa	Banjar; Banjar Tegeha; Banyuatis; Banyuseri; Cempaga; Dencarik; Gesing; Gobleg; Kaliasem; Kayuputih; Munduk; Pedawa; Sidetapa; Tampekan; Temukus; Tigawasa; Tirtasari
51.08.06	Buleleng	17	12	Desa	Alasangker; Anturan; Bakti Seraga; Jinengdalem; Kalibukbuk; Nagasepaha; Pemaron; Penglatan; Petandakan; Poh Bergong; Sari Mekar; Tukadmungga
51.08.06	Buleleng	17	12	Kelurahan	Astina; Banjar Bali; Banjar Jawa; Banjar Tegal; Banyuasri; Banyuning; Beratan; Kaliuntu; Kampung Anyar; Kampung Baru; Kampung Bugis; Kampung Kajanan; Kampung Singaraja; Kendran; Liligundi; Paket Agung; Penarukan
51.08.03	Busung Biu	-	15	Desa	Bengkel; Bongancina; Busung Biu; Kedis; Kekeran; Pelapuan; Pucaksari; Sepang; Sepang Kelod; Subuk; Telaga; Tinggarsari; Tista; Titab; Umejero
51.08.01	Gerokgak	-	14	Desa	Banyupoh; Celukanbawang; Gerokgak; Musi; Patas; Pejarakan; Pemuteran; Pengulon; Penyabangan; Sanggalangit; Sumberklampok; Sumberkima; Tinga-Tinga; Tukadsumaga
51.08.08	Kubutambahan	-	13	Desa	Bengkala; Bila; Bontihing; Bukti; Bulian; Depeha; Kubutambahan; Mengening; Pakisan; Tajun; Tambakan; Tamblang; Tunjung
51.08.07	Sawan	-	14	Desa	Bebetin; Bungkulan; Galungan; Giri Emas; Jagaraga; Kerobokan; Lemukih; Menyali; Sangsit; Sawan; Sekumpul; Sinabun; Sudaji; Suwug
51.08.02	Seririt	1	20	Desa	Banjar Asem; Bestala; Bubunan; Gunungsari; Joanyar; Kalianget; Kalisada; Lokapaksa; Mayong; Munduk Bestala; Pangkung Paruk; Patemon; Pengastulan; Rangdu; Ringdikit; Sulanyah; Tangguwisia; Ularan; Umeanyar; Unggahan
51.08.02	Seririt	1	20	Kelurahan	Seririt
51.08.05	Sukasada	1	14	Desa	Ambengan; Git Git; Kayu Putih; Padang Bulia; Pancasari; Panji; Panji Anom; Pegadungan; Pegayaman; Sambangan; Selat; Silangjana; Tegal Linggah; Wanagiri
51.08.05	Sukasada	1	14	Kelurahan	Sukasada
51.08.09	Tejakula	-	10	Desa	Bondalem; Julah; Les; Madenan; Pacung; Penuktukan; Sambirenteng; Sembiran; Tejakula; Tembok
	TOTAL	19	129		

== See also ==
- List of districts of Indonesia
- List of districts of Bali
- Subdivisions of Indonesia
