= Kintamani =

Kintamani may refer to:

- Kintamani, Bali, a district and a village in Indonesia
- Kintamani dog, a dog breed native to Bali, Indonesia
