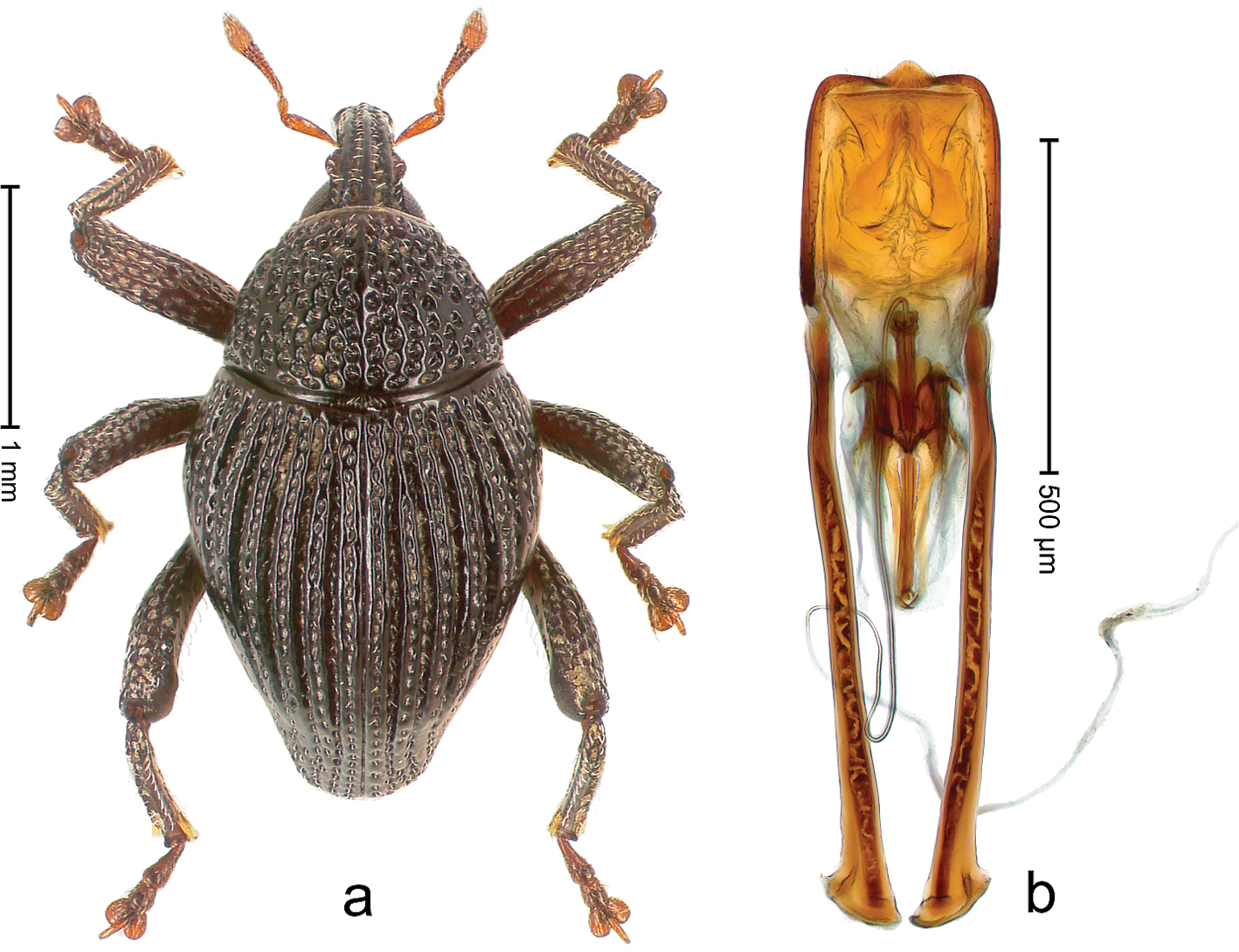

Scientific classification
- Kingdom: Animalia
- Phylum: Arthropoda
- Class: Insecta
- Order: Coleoptera
- Suborder: Polyphaga
- Infraorder: Cucujiformia
- Family: Curculionidae
- Genus: Trigonopterus
- Species: T. kintamanensis

Binomial name
- Trigonopterus kintamanensis Riedel, 2014

= Trigonopterus kintamanensis =

Species of beetle

Trigonopterus kintamanensis is a species of flightless weevil in the genus Trigonopterus from Indonesia.

== Etymology ==
The specific name is derived from that of the type locality.

== Description ==
Individuals measure 2.28–2.45 mm in length. Body is slightly oval in shape. General coloration black, with rust-colored antennae and legs.

== Range ==
The species is found around elevations of 1,440 metres (4,720 ft) in Kintamani on the Indonesian island province of Bali.

== Phylogeny ==
T. kintamanensis is part of the T. saltator species group.
