= Lt. Col. Wisnu Airfield =

Lieutenant Colonel Wisnu Airfield Lapangan Terbang Letnan Kolonel Wisnu
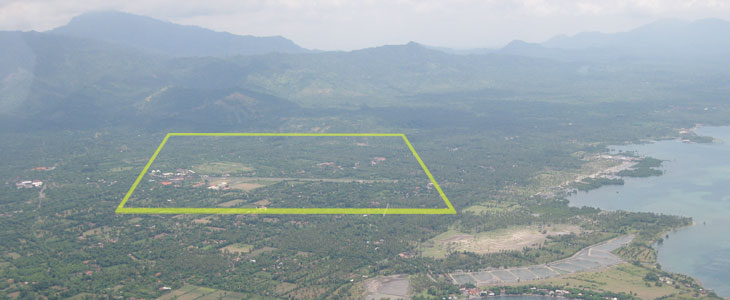
- Aerial view of the airfield
- IATA: WSN; ICAO: WADE

Summary
- Location: Sumberkima, Buleleng Regency, Bali, Indonesia
- Time zone: Indonesia Central Time (+8)
- Elevation AMSL: 40 ft / 11 m
- Coordinates: 8.139483°S 114.615703°E

Map
- Location in Bali Location in the Lesser Sunda Islands Location in Indonesia

Runways
Direction	Length		Surface
Direction	ft	m	Surface
14/32	3,400	1,400	asphalt

Lieutenant Colonel Wisnu Airfield (Indonesian: Lapangan Terbang Letnan Kolonel Wisnu) also referred to as Buleleng Airport (Indonesian: Bandar Udara Buleleng) is located in Sumberkima, Buleleng Regency, Bali, Indonesia. Construction was funded by the local government and completed in 2007. Airfield runway are planned to be extended from 600 to 1200 meters by 2010. The airport is usually used by a flight school, but as of 2023 the airport is unused as the contract with the flight school has run out.

== Airfield information ==
Short-field landing recommended for RWY 14. Obstacles (trees, houses, mosque) surrounding the airfield from the north and high terrain elevation from the south. The airfield is used by a local flight academy, causing constant departures and arrivals of Cessna 172s, some of which are piloted by solo students. Information service is attended erratically. This airport is usually used for mutual cross-country flights to east Bali and back. The airport's frequency is 122.55 and its call sign is "Wisnu Info". The airport is generally open from Monday to Saturday around the times 00:00-09:00 UTC.
