= Lake Batur =

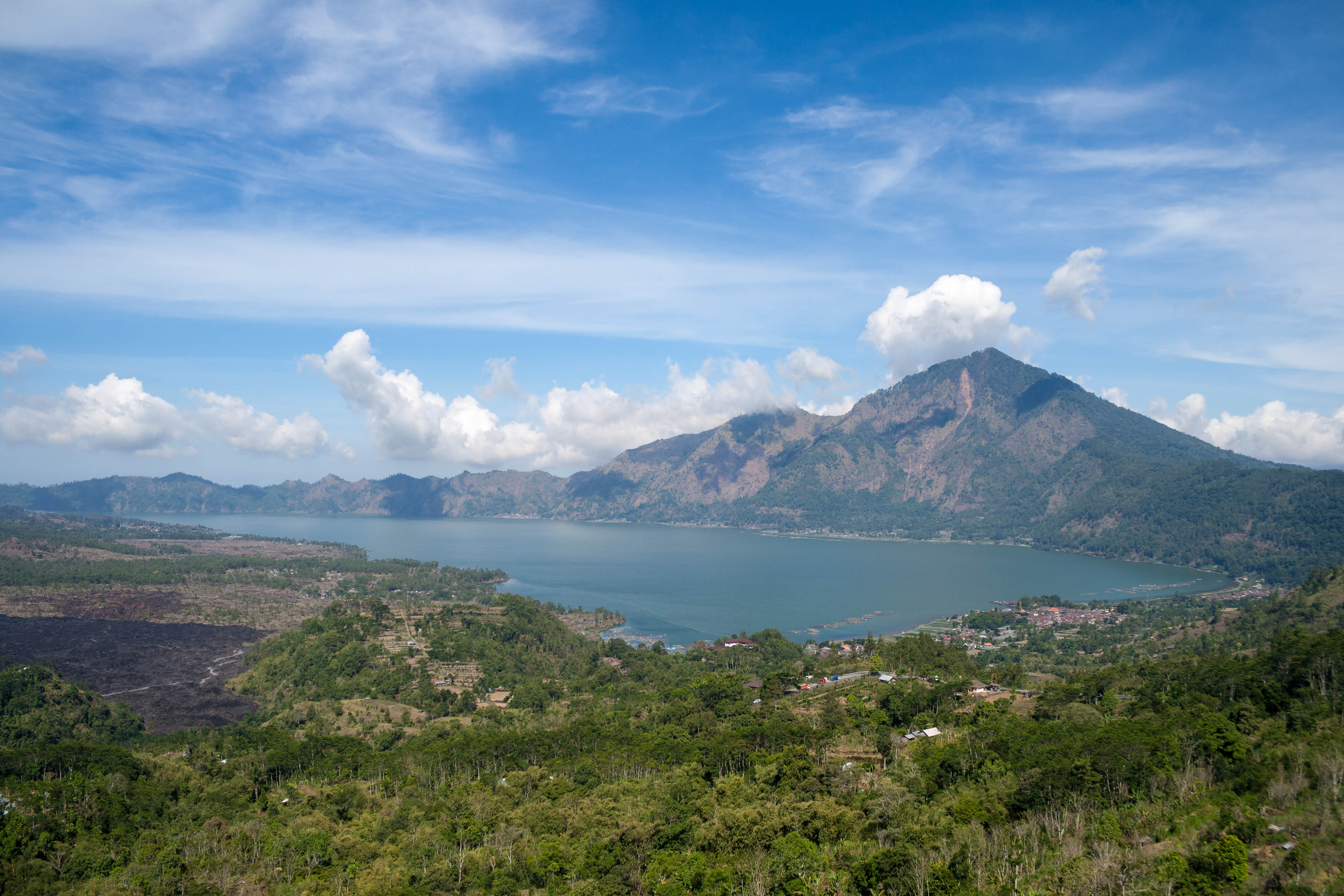
- Lake Batur and Mount Abang

- Location within Bali
- Location: Kintamani, Bali, Bangli Regency, Bali, Indonesia
- Coordinates: 08°15′30″S 115°24′30″E
- Type: Polymictic, Volcanic crater lake
- Max. length: 2.5 km (1.6 mi)
- Max. width: 7.5 km (4.7 mi)
- Surface area: 15.9 km^{2} (3,900 acres)
- Max. depth: 88 m (289 ft)
- Water volume: 0.82 km^{3} (660,000 acre⋅ft)
- Surface elevation: 1,031 m (3,383 ft)

Lake Batur (Indonesian: Danau Batur; Balinese: ᬤᬦᬸᬩᬢᬸᬃ, Danu Batur) is a volcanic crater lake in Kintamani, Bali, Bangli Regency of Bali, located about 30 km (19 mi) northeast of Ubud in Bali. The lake is inside of the caldera of an active volcano, Mount Batur, located along the Ring of Fire of volcanic activity.

== Geography ==
Lake Batur lies south-east of the active Mount Batur volcano, inside the older Batur caldera.

=== Bathymetry ===
The deepest point in the lake is around 88 meters.

== Watershed ==
=== Inflow from agriculture ===
The Batur caldera is an important agricultural area, with cultivation of a wide range of produce. The irrigation water flows back into the lake after it has been pumped up, bringing with it nutrients to the lake body.

=== Inflow from hot springs ===
In the village of Toya Bungkah, there are several hot springs related to the volcanic activity of the Mount Batur volcano. These have been developed for tourism purposes. The water from these hot springs flows into the lake.

== Aquaculture ==
The Batur lake has been in recent years, farmed for fish. The Nile tilapia was the dominant species in the lake when a study was undertaken in 2011. The local name for the fish is Ikan Mujair.

=== Fish death ===
On the morning of 19 June 2011, greenish-white spots emerged on the surface of the lake. These spots later merged, stretching from Toya Bungkah to Buahan. In conjunction with the colour changes, thousands of dead fish floated to the surface. The cause of the fish death was believed to be related to the high diurnal-temperature difference during the onset of the dry season. As a result of the temperature difference, mixing of the water happened due to currents developed, which in turn mixed up the decomposing sediments, bringing toxic gases to the surface. By late 21 June 2011, the water colour was back to normal.

== See also ==
- Bali Bird Park
- Lake Tamblingan
- List of drainage basins of Indonesia
- Tegenungan Waterfall
- Tukad Daya
