= List of districts and sub-districts in Denpasar City =

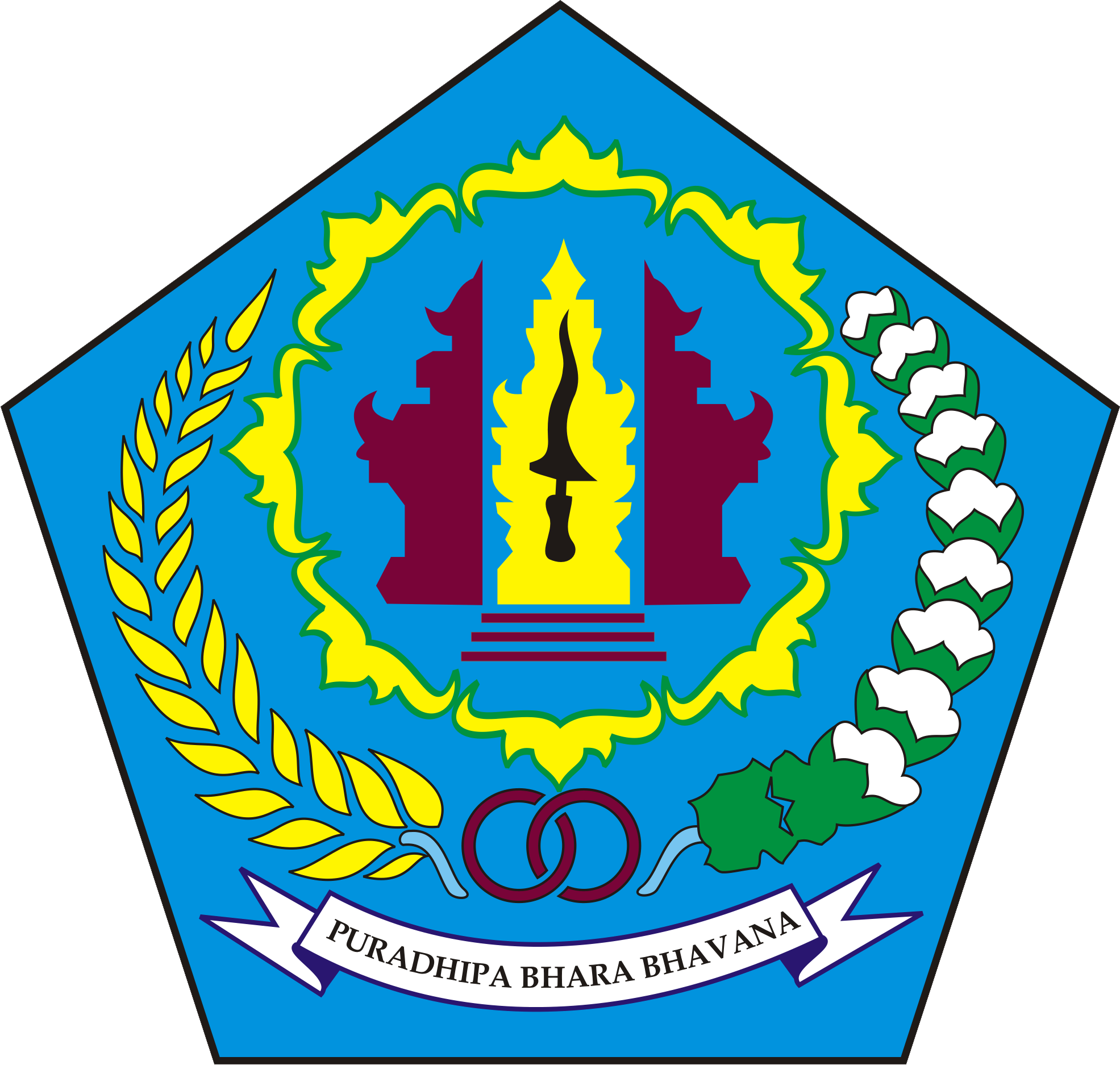
Denpasar City Logo

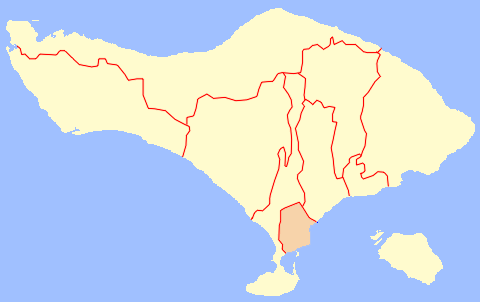
Map of Denpasar City in Bali

Map of districts in Denpasar

The following is a list of districts and villages in Denpasar City. Denpasar City comprises 4 districts (kecamatan), subdivided into 16 urban villages (kelurahan) and 27 rural villages (desa), for a total amount of 43 villages. In mid 2022, the population was officially estimated at 726,808 (comprising 366,953 males and 359,855 females) with its area being 125.98 km² and its density 5,769 people/km^{2}.

List of districts and villages in Denpasar City as follows:

Code	Districts	Urban villages	Rural villages	Total villages	Status	List
51.71.03	West Denpasar	3	8	11	Desa	Dauh Puri Kangin; Dauh Puri Kauh; Dauh Puri Klod; Padang Sambian Kaja; Padang Sambian Klod; Pemecutan Klod; Tegal Harum; Tegal Kerta
51.71.03	West Denpasar	3	8	11	Kelurahan	Dauh Puri; Padang Sambian; Pemecutan
51.71.01	South Denpasar	6	4	10	Desa	Pemogan; Sanur Kaja; Sanur Kauh; Sidakarya
51.71.01	South Denpasar	6	4	10	Kelurahan	Panjer; Pedungan; Renon; Sanur; Serangan; Sesetan
51.71.02	East Denpasar	4	7	11	Desa	Dangin Puri Klod; Kesiman Kertalangu; Kesiman Petilan; Penatih Dangin Puri; Sumerta Kaja; Sumerta Kauh; Sumerta Klod/Kelod
51.71.02	East Denpasar	4	7	11	Kelurahan	Dangin Puri; Kesiman; Penatih; Sumerta
51.71.04	North Denpasar	3	8	11	Desa	Dangin Puri Kaja; Dangin Puri Kangin; Dangin Puri Kauh; Dauh Puri Kaja; Peguyangan Kaja; Peguyangan Kangin; Pemecutan Kaja; Ubung Kaja
51.71.04	North Denpasar	3	8	11	Kelurahan	Peguyangan; Tonja; Ubung
	TOTAL	16	27	43		

== See also ==
- List of districts of Indonesia
- List of districts of Bali
- Subdivisions of Indonesia
