= Tukad Daya =

River in Bali

- The headwaters and mouth of the Tukad Daya as well as the Tamblang Dam location.

Location
- Country: Indonesia
- Province: Bali
- Regency: Buleleng; Bangli

Physical characteristics
- Source: Mount Batur
  - coordinates: 8.20919°S 115.31212°E
  - elevation: 1,500 m (4,900 ft)
- 2nd source: Mount Bratan
  - coordinates: 8.2209°S 115.2043°E
  - elevation: 1,300 m (4,300 ft)
- Mouth: Bali Sea
  - location: Bungkulan
  - coordinates: 8.0641°S 115.1593°E
- Length: 40 km (25 mi)
- Basin size: 93 km^{2} (36 sq mi)

Basin features
- River system: Tukad Daya basin
- Landmarks: Patung Sapi Duwe Tambakan village (western upstream), Tugu Pahlawan Catur village (eastern upstream), Tamblang (Danu Kerthi) dam, Puputan Jagaraga historical landmark, STIKES Buleleng
- Waterbodies: Tamblang (Danu Kerthi) dam
- Waterfalls: Black Lava waterfall, Mabun waterfall, Mengening waterfall, Carat waterfall

The Tukad Daya is a river located in Buleleng, north of the island of Bali. The 40 km long river originates from its headwaters around Kintamani, north of the highland ridge stretching between the northwest slope of the Batur caldera and the east slope of the Bratan caldera. Flowing through the gorges, it reaches the northern coast of Bali around Bungkulan and empties into the Bali Sea.

== Drainage basin ==
Tukad Daya is the main stem in the river system of Tukad Daya, which covers an area of 93 km^{2} (36 sq mi), including parts of the Kintamani, Sawan, and Kubutambahan districts. Generally, the topography of the Tukad Daya basin consists of steep slopes from two mountains range, namely Mount Batur and Bratan, and gradually descends around the northern coast in Bungkulan.

To the south of the upstream of the Tukad Daya basin, it is adjacent to the Tukad Ayung basin. The hydrological boundary along the ridge of the Kintamani highland has divided the flow into two directions, namely the northern flow and the southern flow of Bali. On the western side of the upstream area of the Tukad Daya basin, it is adjacent to the upstream of the Penarukan basin and the Sansit basin from the central part to the downstream of the basin. Meanwhile, to the east of the Tukad Daya basin, it borders with several basin from the upper to the downstream.

== Utilization ==
A multipurpose dam with a storage capacity of up to 5.1 million cubic meters, covering an inundation area of approximately 29.8 hectares, has been constructed along the course of this river in the Sawan district and was inaugurated in February 2023 by President Joko Widodo. The Tamblang Dam, now renamed the Danu Kerthi Dam, has the potential to supply raw water at a rate of 510 liters per second to its surrounding areas. serving as irrigation water for a 558-hectare irrigation area. Additionally, it functions as a Micro Hydro Power Plant capable of generating 0.54 MW of electricity. The dam also contributes to flood control with a retention capacity of 156.86 m3/second against floods, supporting conservation efforts, and serving as a tourist attraction.

== See also ==
- List of drainage basins of Indonesia
- Water resources
- Lake Batur
- Bali Kingdom
- Kintamani (dog)
- Tegenungan Waterfall
- Subak (irrigation)
