= Sawan, Buleleng =

District in Buleleng Regency, Bali Province, Indonesia

Sawan is a district (kecamatan) in the regency of Buleleng in northern Bali, Indonesia. The district is the most important rice-producing area of Bali and employs many local people.

Location within Buleleng

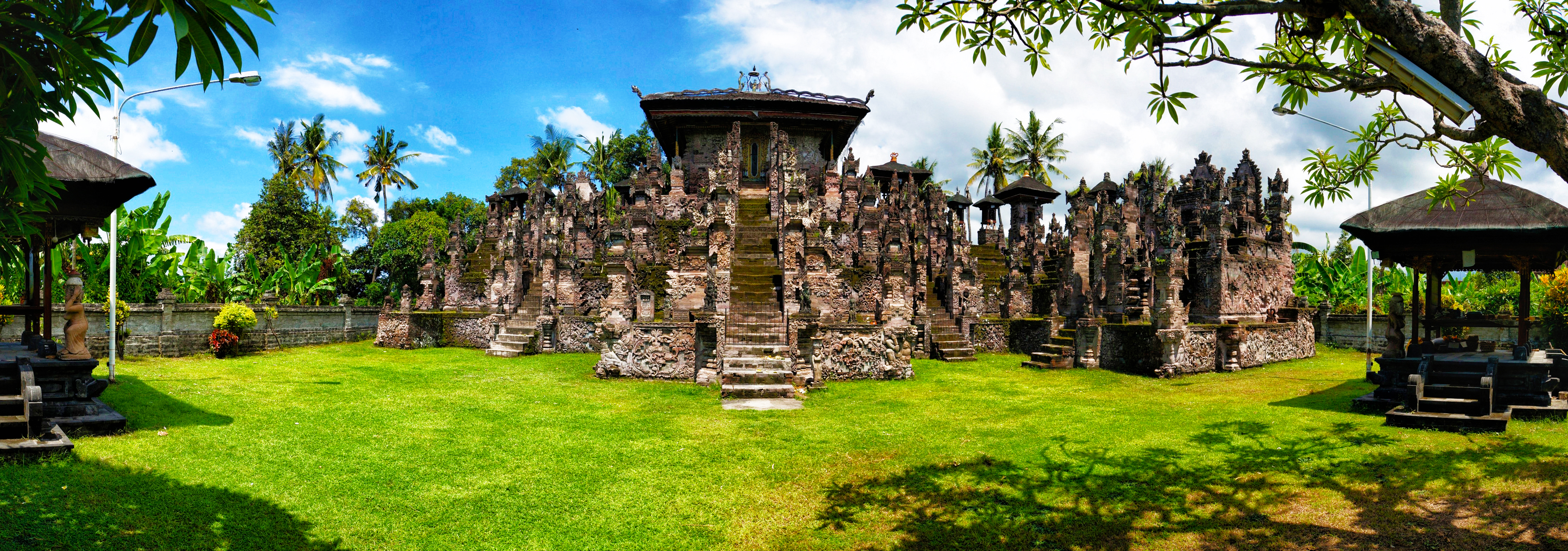
Pura Beji Sangsit.

== Towns and Villages ==
The district is sub-divided into 14 rural villages (desa) - all sharing the post code 81171 - as follows:

- 2001 Lemukih
- 2002 Galungan
- 2003 Sekumpul
- 2004 Bebetin
- 2005 Sudaji
- 2006 Sawan
- 2007 Menyali

- 2008 Suwug
- 2009 Jagaraga
- 2010 Sinabun
- 2011 Kerobokan
- 2012 Sangsit
- 2013 Bungkulan
- 2014 Giri Emas

== See also ==
- Kintamani, Bali
- Lake Tamblingan
- Subak (irrigation)
- Tukad Daya
