= Mount Batur =

Volcano in Bali, Indonesia

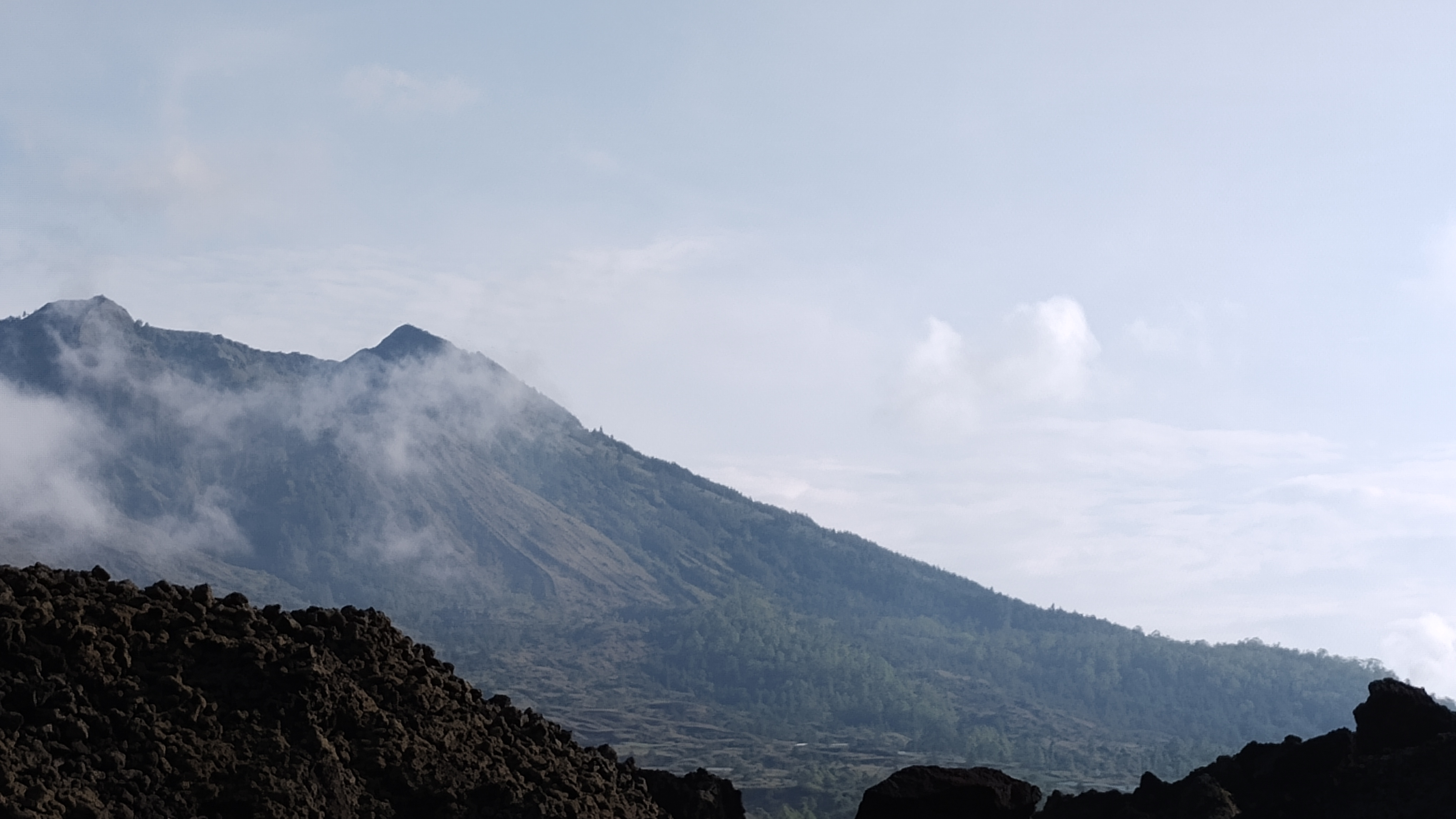
- A view of Mt. Batur from the lava formations on the morning of April 8th 2026.

Highest point
- Elevation: 1,717 m (5,633 ft)
- Listing: Spesial Ribu
- Coordinates: 8°14′20″S 115°22′39″E

Geography
- Location within Bali
- Location: Bangli Regency, Bali, Indonesia

Geology
- Mountain type: Somma volcano
- Volcanic arc: Sunda Arc
- Last eruption: 1999 to 2000

Mount Batur (Indonesian: Gunung Batur; Balinese: ᬕᬸᬦᬸᬂᬩᬢᬸᬃ, romanized: gunung batuŕ) is an active volcano located at the center of two concentric calderas northwest of Mount Agung on the island of Bali, Indonesia. The southeast side of the larger 10×13 km caldera contains a caldera lake. Both the larger caldera, and a smaller 7.5 km caldera were formed by a collapse of the magma chamber, the first larger collapse taking place about 29,300 years ago, and the second inner caldera collapsing about 20,150 years ago. Another estimate of the inner caldera's formation date, formed during the emplacement of the Bali (or Ubud) ignimbrite, has been dated at about 23,670 and 28,500 years ago.

The first documented eruption was in 1804 and the most recent was in 2000.

== Active volcano and Lake Batur in the caldera ==
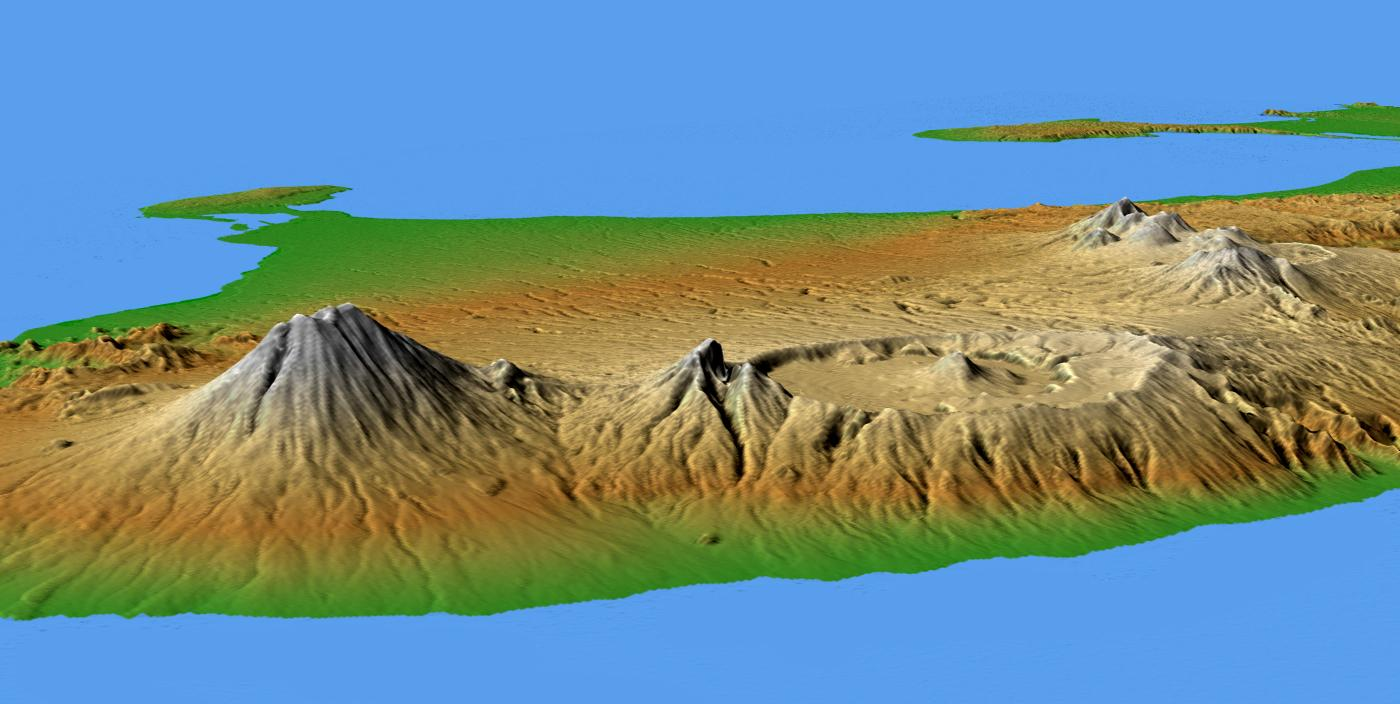
Mount Batur, or what remains of it, is to the right of center; Mount Agung is at the left; on the far right is Mount Bratan. This view is looking towards the southwest.

The eruption that brought this volcano to be visible above the ocean is one of the most forceful on the Earth. This volcano is marked by a collapsed top, called a caldera.

The caldera contains an active, 700-metre-tall stratovolcano rising above the surface of Lake Batur. The first documented eruption of Batur was in 1804, and it has been frequently active since then, most recently in 2000. The substantial lava field from the 1963 eruption is visible today when viewed from Kintamani, a town on the southwest ridge of the caldera.

== Villages in the caldera ==
The caldera is populated and includes the four main villages of Kedisan, Songan, Trunyan, and Toya Bungkah, among a total of 15 villages. The locals largely rely on agriculture for income but tourism has become increasingly popular due to the relatively straightforward trek to the summit of the central crater.

== Global Geoparks Network ==
On 20 September 2012 UNESCO made Mount Batur Caldera a part of the Global Geoparks Network.

== Sedimentation ==
Heavy sedimentation in Mount Batur Caldera decreases the water in the lake. A plan was devised to restrict locations around the lake for tourist accommodations, to inform residents of the problems of fish farm cages in the lake, and perhaps to dredge some of the natural sedimentation from volcanic ash.

The lake is subject to water pollution from fishing and agricultural runoff, promoting the growth of too many water hyacinths, further worsening conditions in the lake, causing some to wonder if the lake will disappear between heavy sedimentation at the bottom and a dense cover of water hyacinths.

== Gallery ==
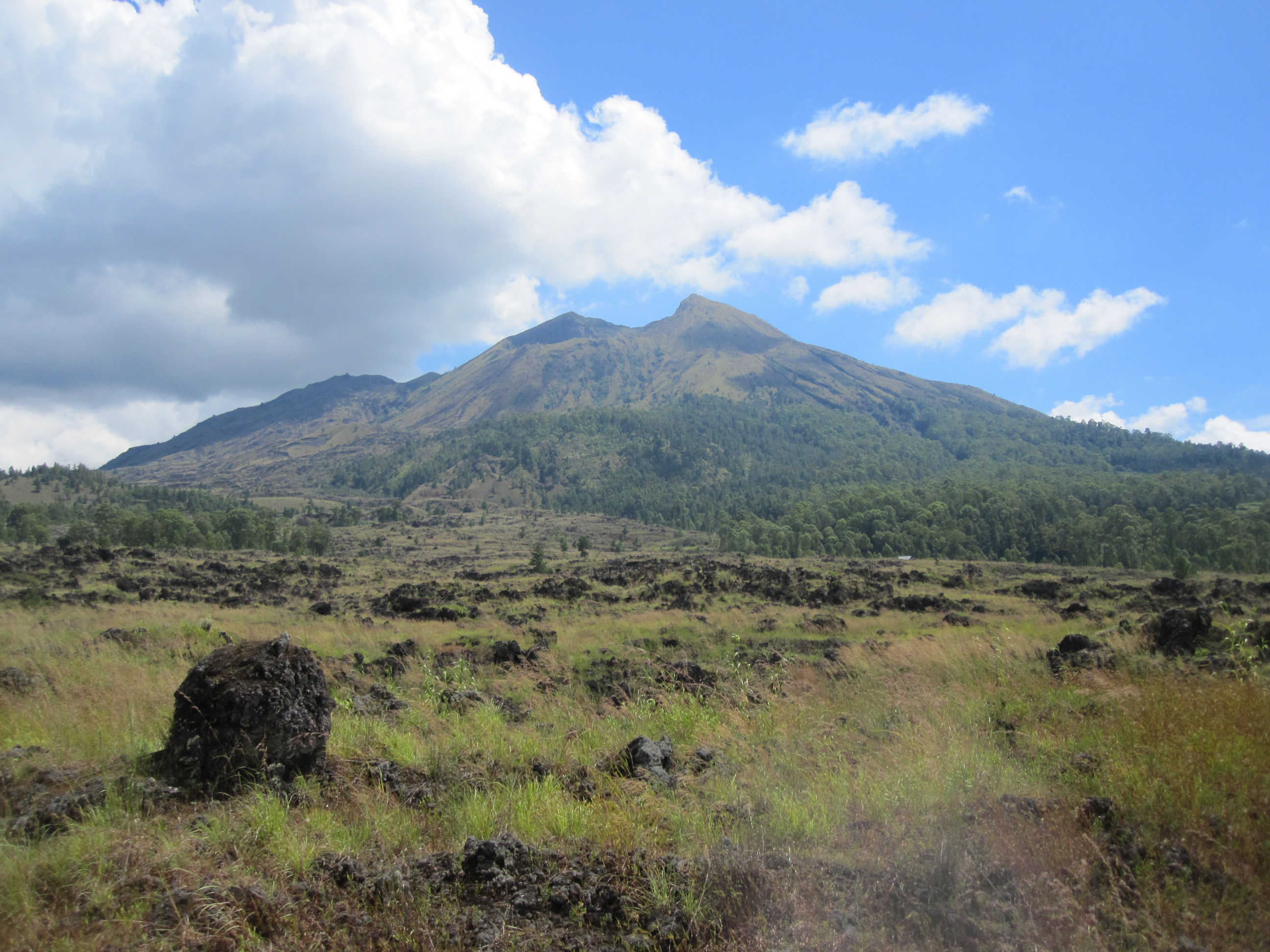
From the southeast foot.

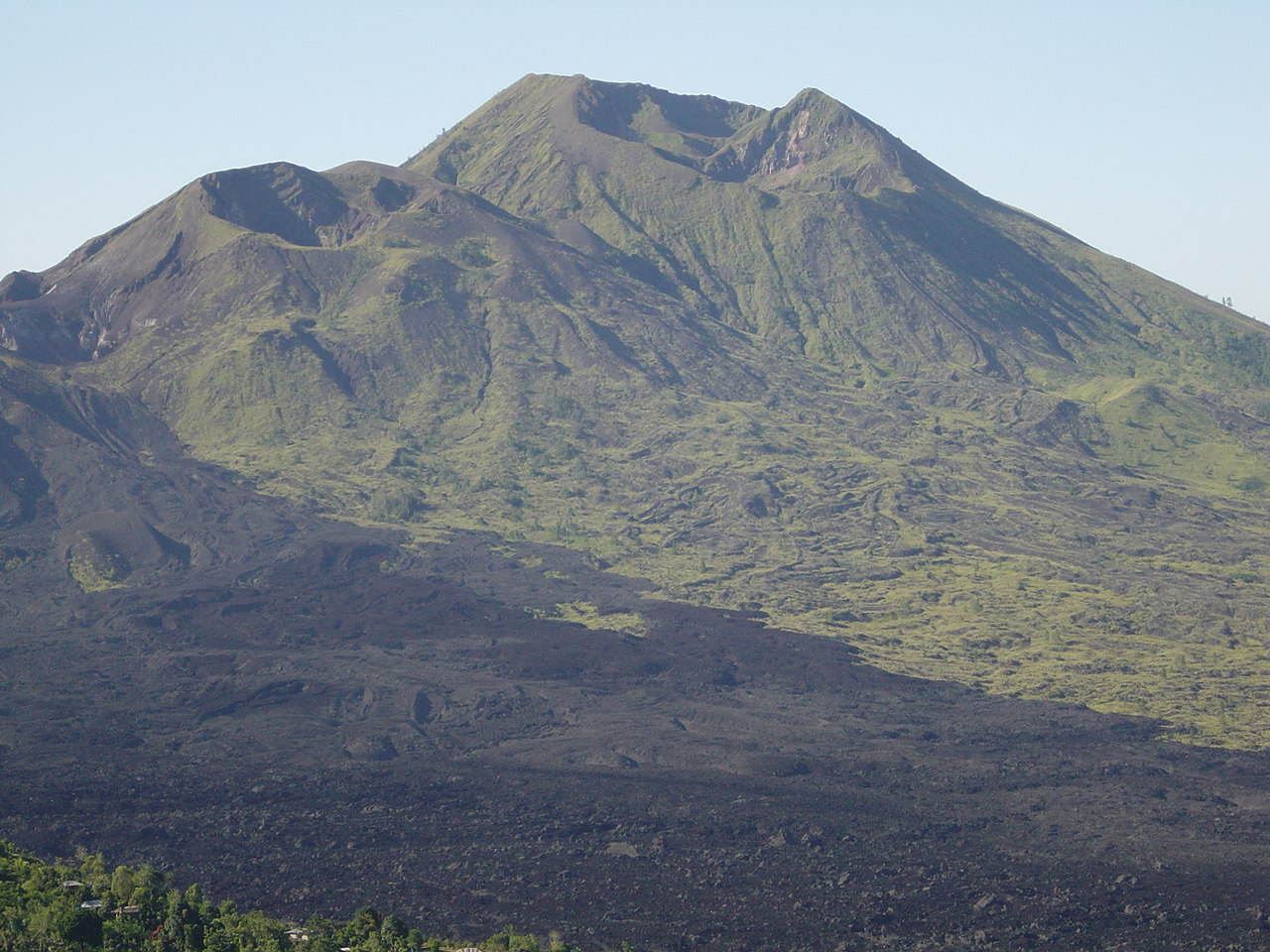
From the SSW.

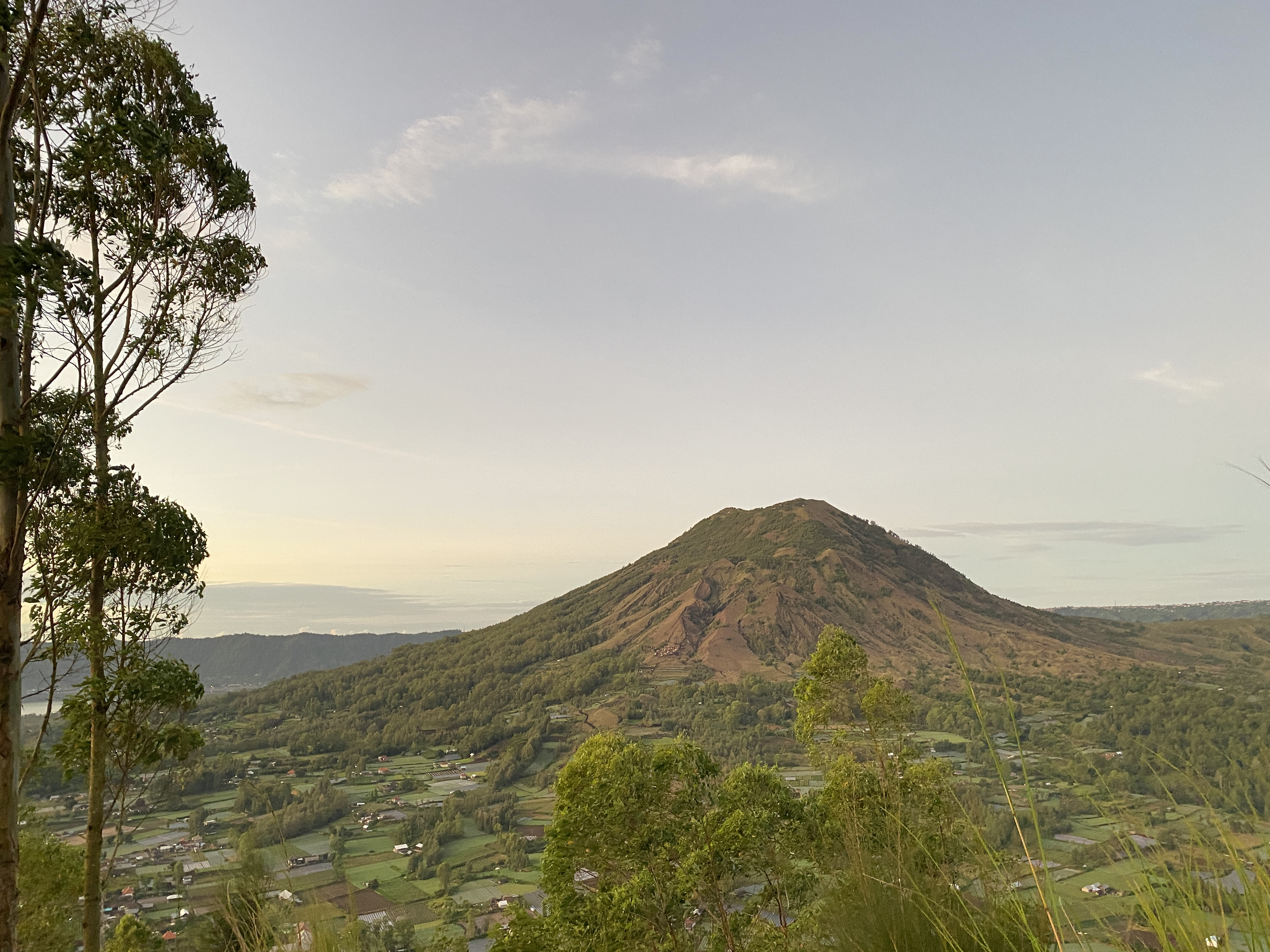
From the northeast.

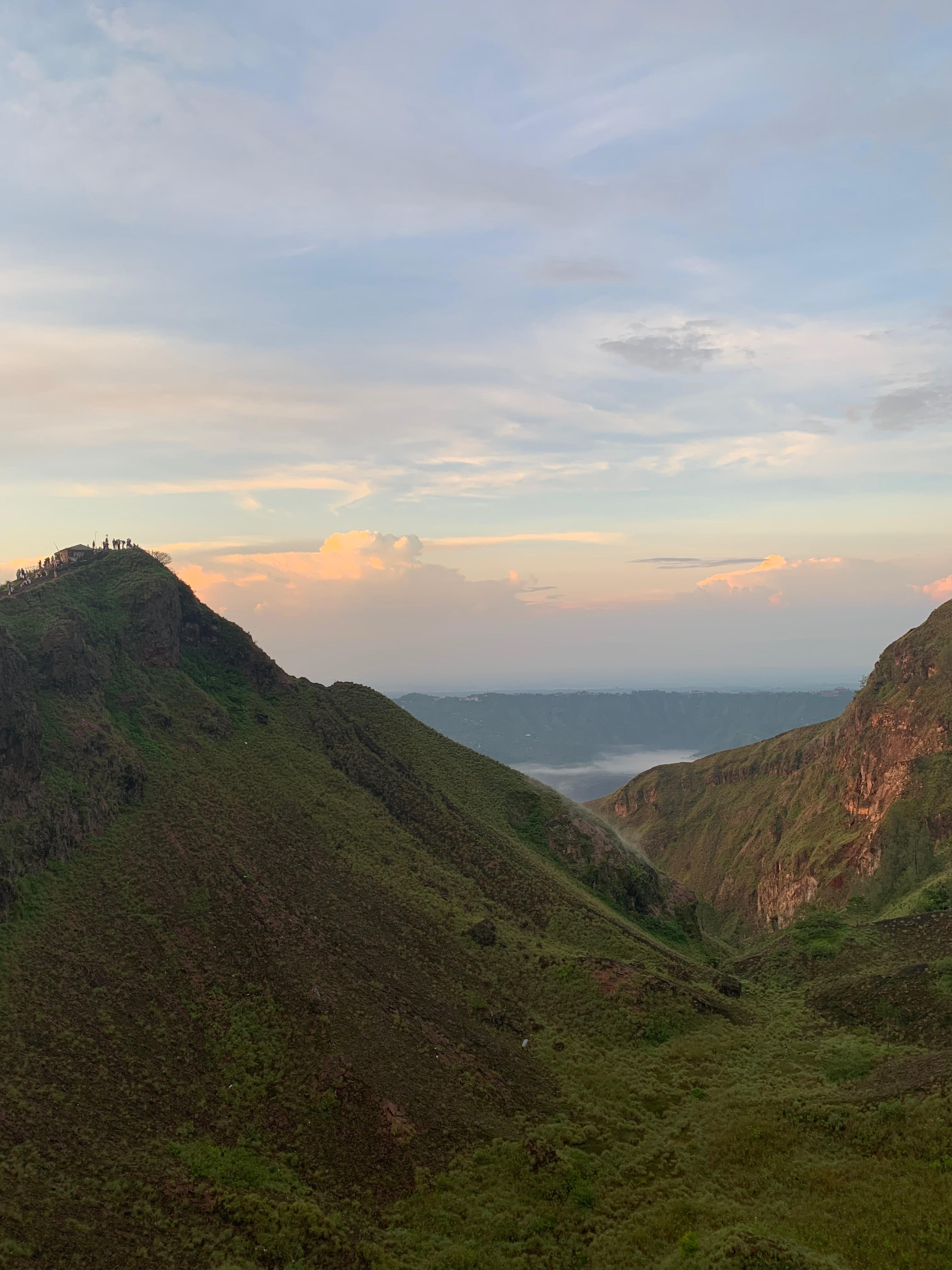
View from Mount Batur

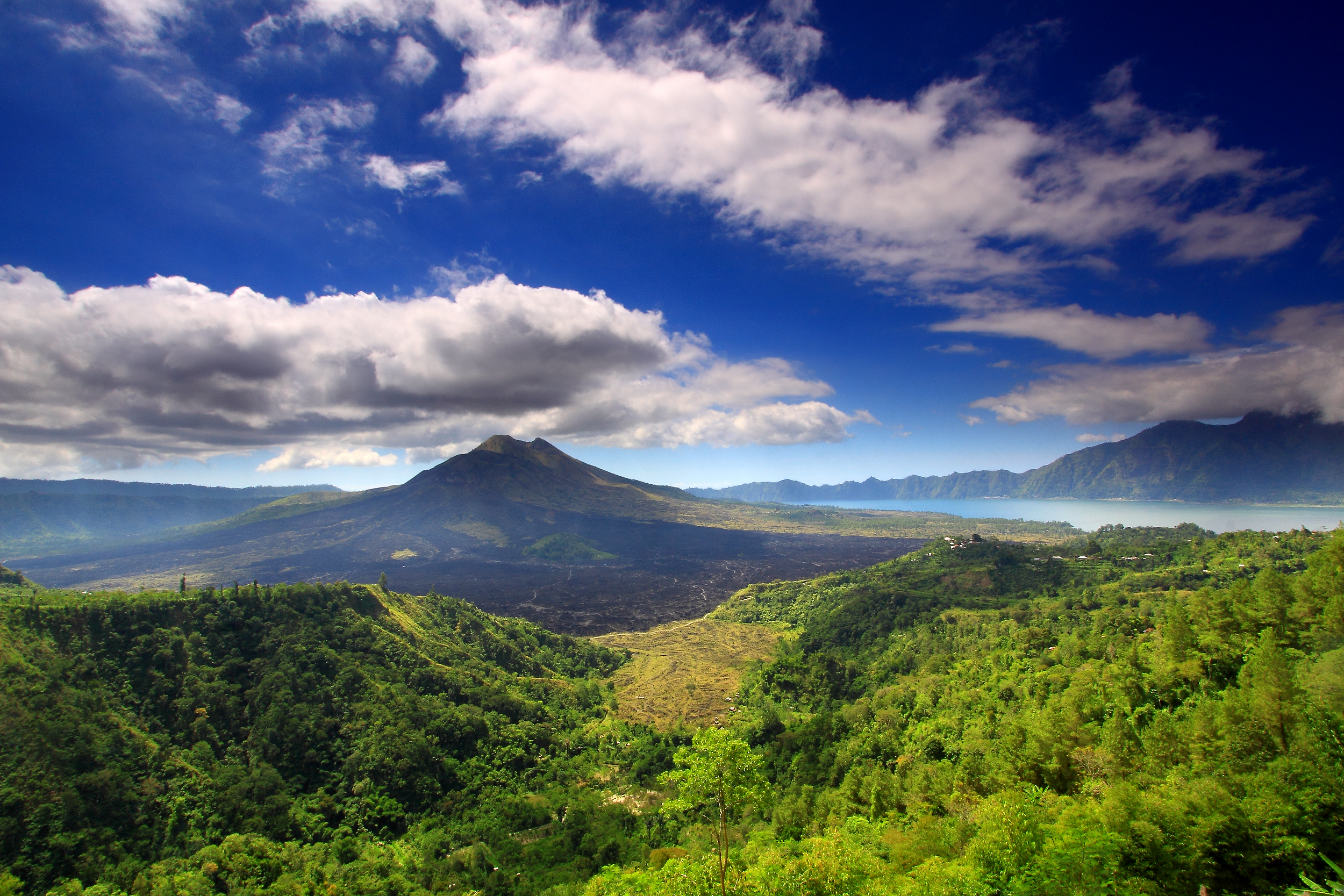
Batur caldera as seen from the southwest.
Mount Batur in the center. Lake Batur on the right.
Taken from the caldera rim in the south-southwest.
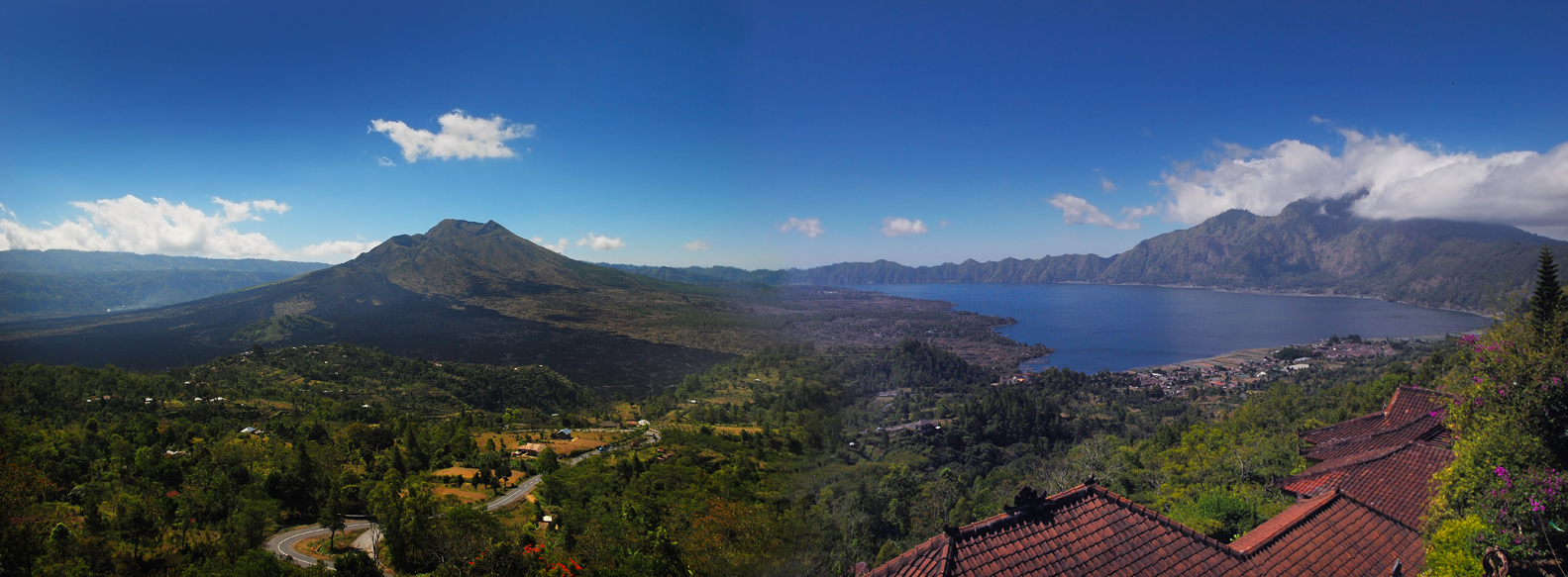
From the south.
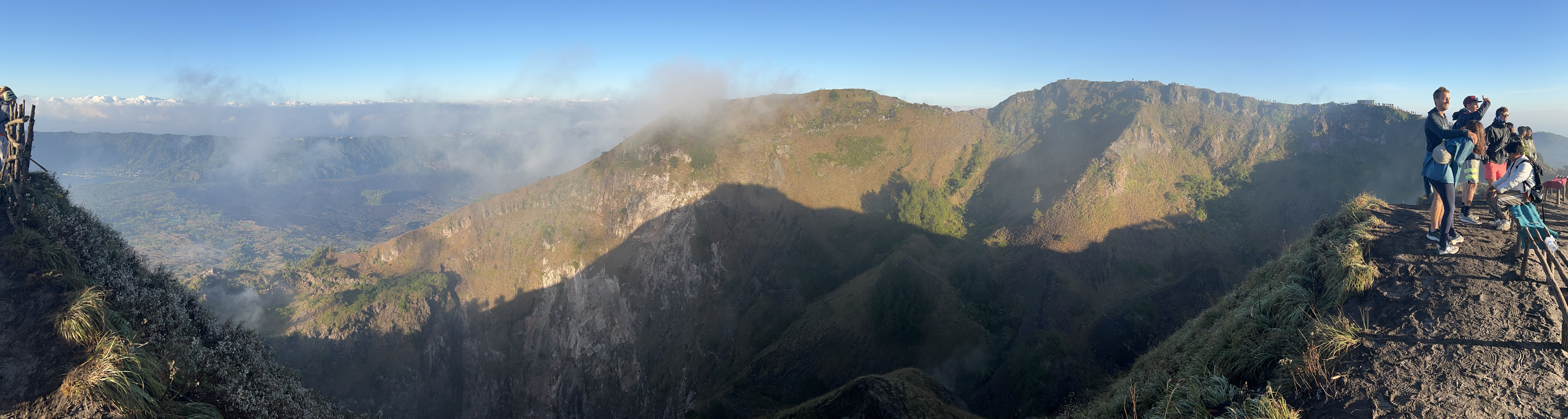
From the top.

== See also ==
- Lake Batur
- Lake Tamblingan
- List of volcanoes in Indonesia
- Subak (irrigation)
- Tukad Ayung
- Tukad Daya
- West Bali National Park
