= Pura Meduwe Karang =

Hindu temple in Bali, Indonesia

Coordinates: 8°4′40″S 115°10′33″E

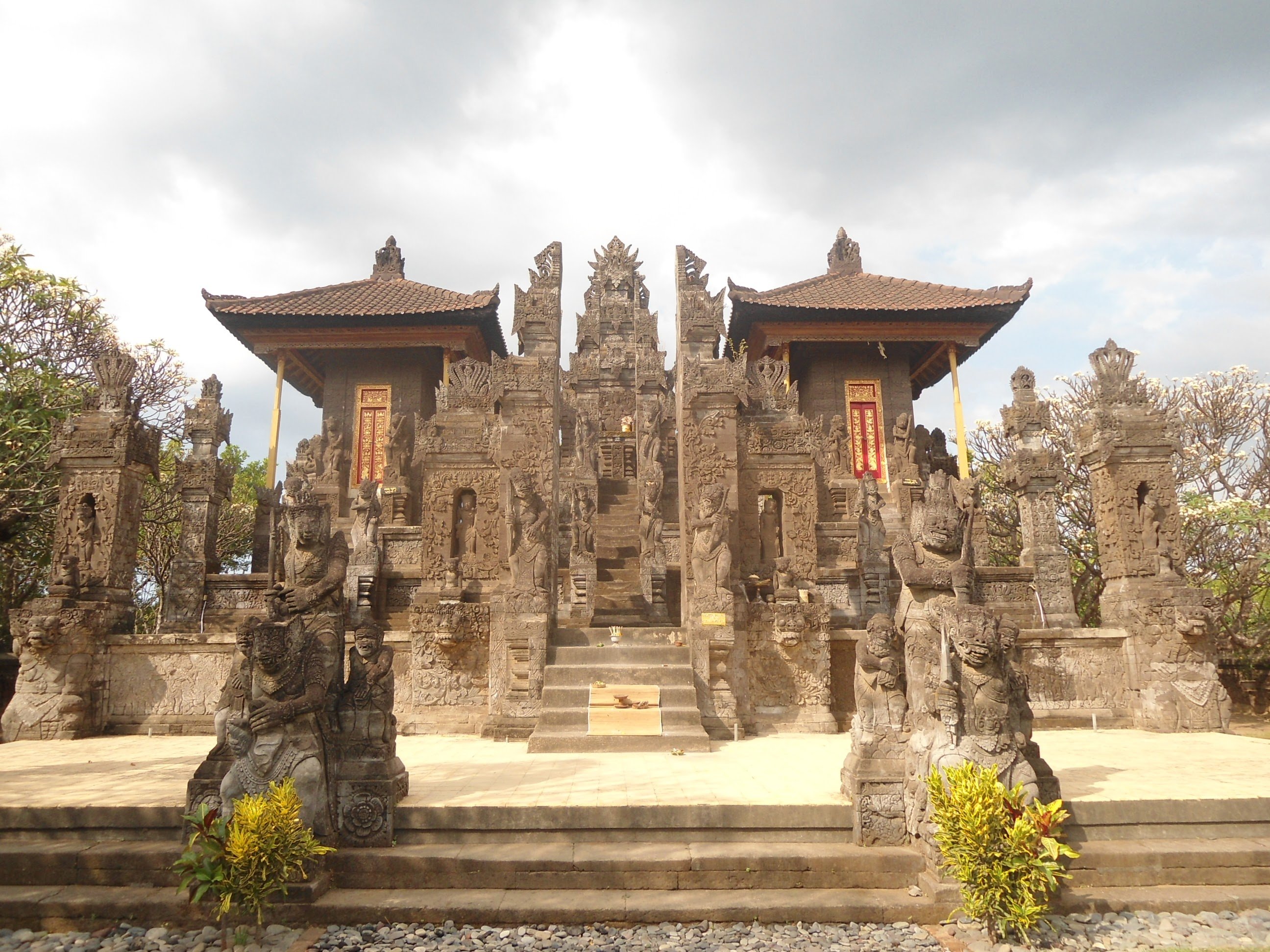
The main shrine of Pura Meduwe Karang.

Pura Meduwe Karang or Pura Maduwe Karang is a Balinese temple located in Kubutambahan, around 12 km east of Singaraja in Buleleng Regency, northern Bali. It is considered one of the principal temples of Bali, due to its size. Pura Meduwe Karang is noted for its statues and flowery style of decorative sculpture, characteristic of North Bali.

== Temple compound ==
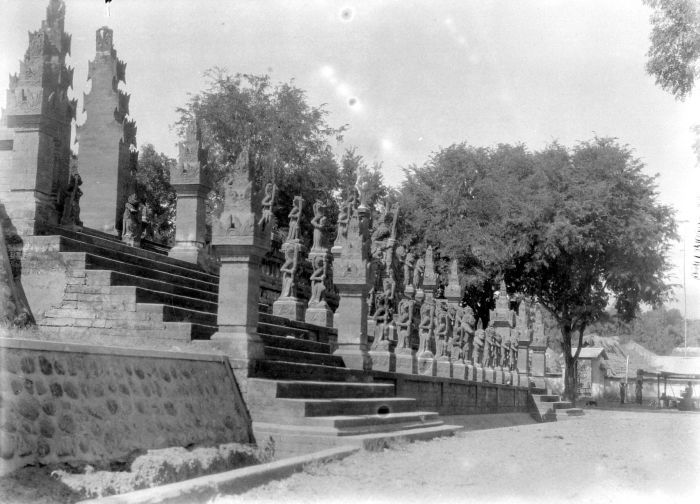
A parade of Ramayana sculptures in the front of the temple complex.

Pura Meduwe Karang (Balinese "temple of the (lord) ground possessor") was constructed in 1890 by people who arrived to Kubutambahan from an extinct Balinese village of Bulian. The temple is dedicated to Batara Meduwe Karang ("lord possessing the ground"), a god which offers protection on the fertility of the agricultural land. Pura Meduwe Karang also has shrines dedicated to the sun god Surya and to Mother Earth, all related with the concept of protection of the land's fertility. The temple compound is surrounded with walls, which is reinforced at intervals by pillars topped with carved floral decoration.

At the entrance of the temple is a parade of 36 stone figures representing characters from the Indian epic Ramayana. The sculptures are set on three levels, 13 figures in the lowest row, ten in the middle row, and 13 in the rear highest row. which is flanked by two entrance staircases. The central figure is Kumbhakarna, while surrounding him are the monkey troops of Sugriwa. The twin staircases lead to the entrance terrace (jaba pura). A candi bentar split gateway marks the threshold into the jaba pisan, the outer sanctum of the temple.

The outer sanctum is mainly a courtyard mainly used for gatherings during religious festival celebration. There is a pavilion in this courtyard which is used for gamelan performance during certain events.

The middle sanctum (jaba tengah) is reached from the outer sanctum via a four-tiered candi bentar split gateway. There is a set of two symmetrical pavilions in the middle sanctum.

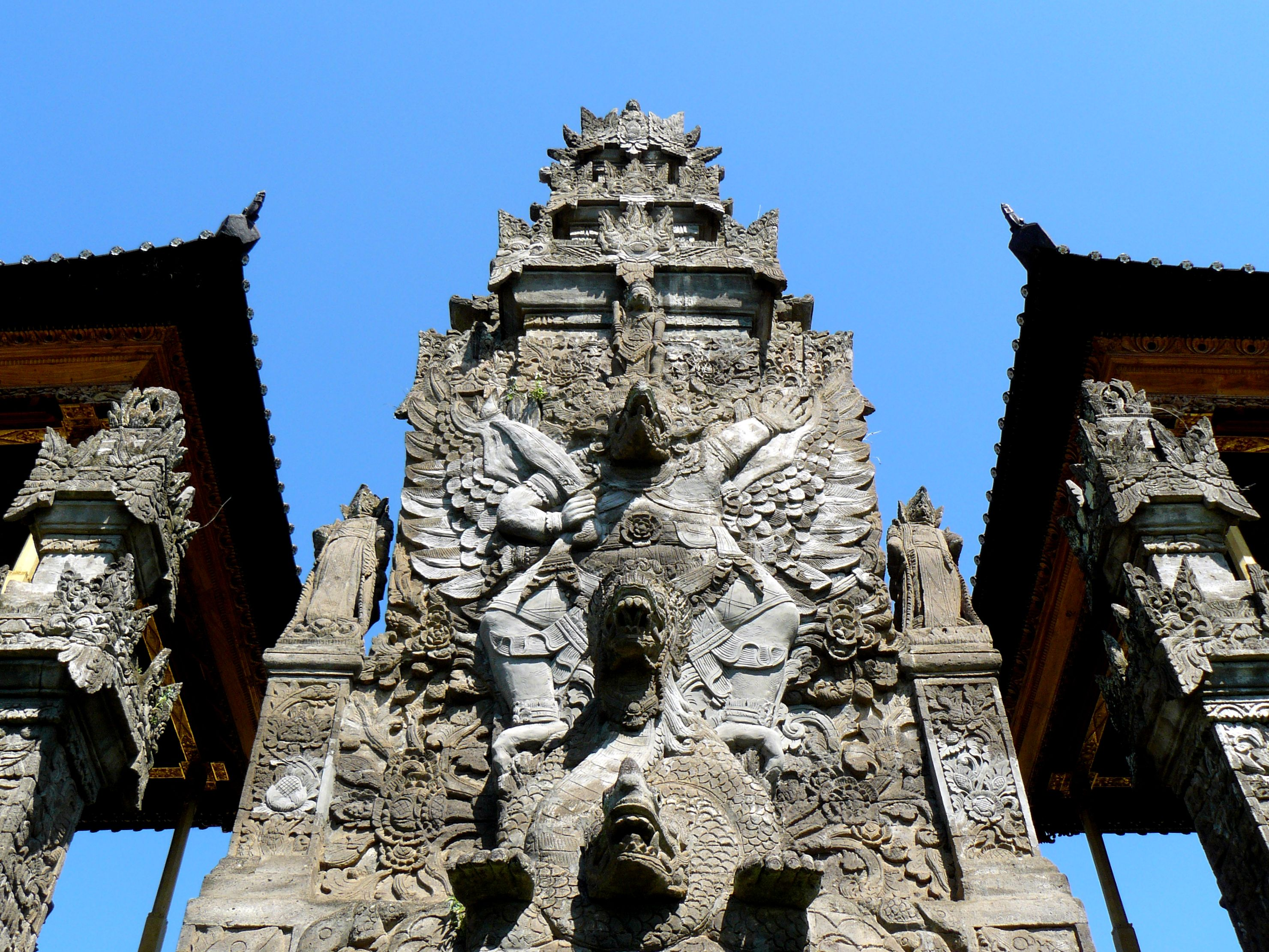
Floral decoration typical of North Bali decorates the main shrine of Pura Meduwe Karang.

The inner sanctum (jero), the most sacred zone of the pura, can be reached from the middle sanctum via another candi bentar split gateway. The highest point of the inner sanctum is reached after passing another candi bentar. This highest point contains the towering main shrine, the Betara Luhur Ing Angkasa shrine. The shrine is decorated with wall sculpture featuring subjects from Balinese legend. The main shrine is flanked to by two shrines to its left and right, one dedicated to Ratu Ayu Sari (a manifestation of the mother earth Ibu Prtiwi), the other is to Ratu Ngurah Sari (protector of the produce of the earth).

== Reliefs ==
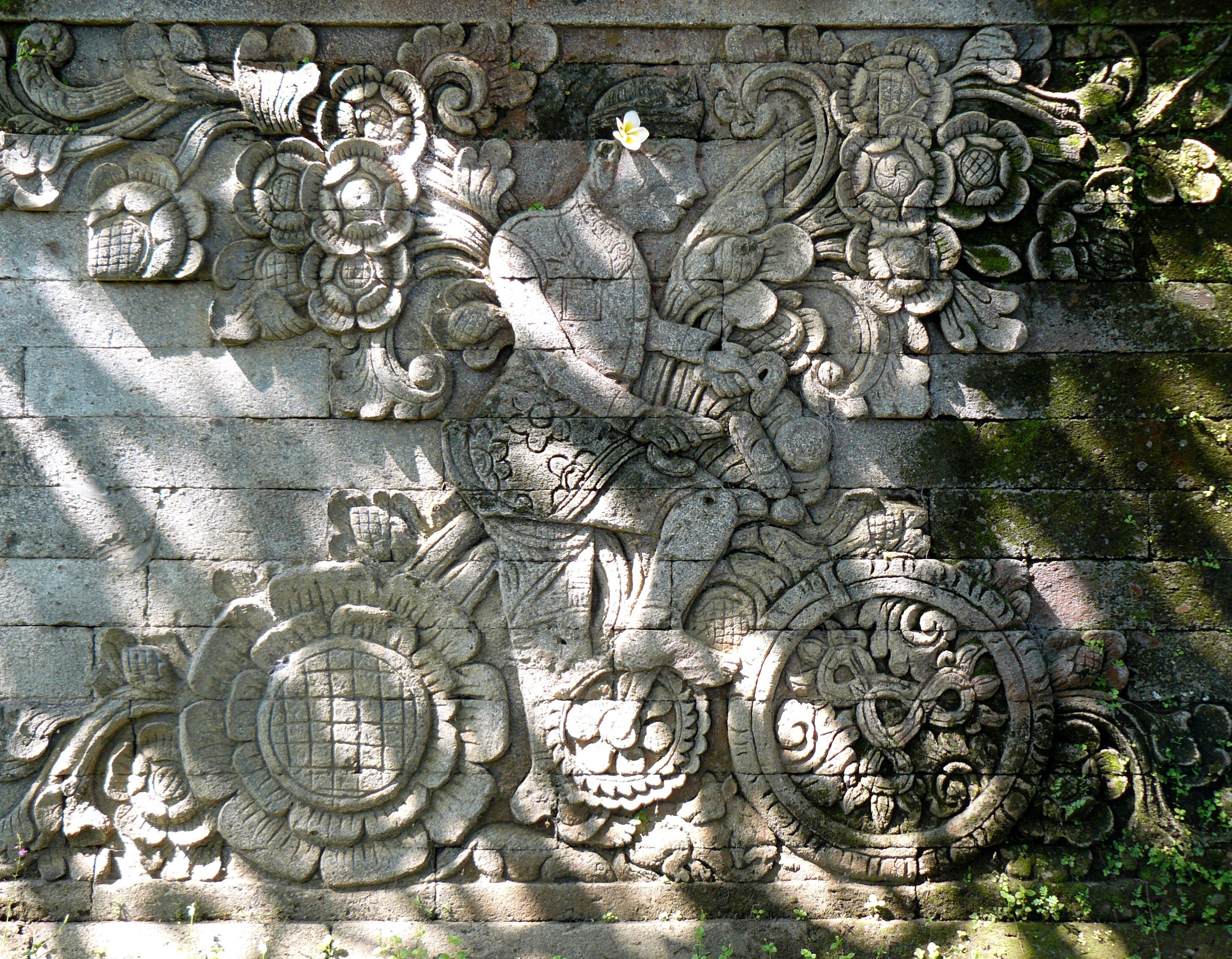
A bas-relief on the side of the main shrine in Pura Meduwe Karang is believed to be a depiction of Dutch artist W. O. J. Nieuwenkamp riding a bicycle. He explored Bali by bicycle in 1904.

On the side of the main shrine is a depiction of a man riding a bicycle. The relief is a depiction of Dutch artist W. O. J. Nieuwenkamp who explored Bali with his bicycle in 1904. This is not the only depiction of a man in a Balinese temple: At the temple of Pura Dalem, Jagaraga, to the east of Singaraja, a relief shows a car driven by bearded foreigners being held up by a gangster armed with a revolver. The reason for a number of international-influenced reliefs in the temples of northern Bali is because of it being the entrance to the island of Bali in the early 20th century. The man-on-bicycle relief is not in its original condition as it was badly damaged in the 1917 earthquake and was altered during the restoration process. The restoration added more floral decorations to the original bas-relief.

Another bas-relief shows the goddess Durga in her manifestation as the Mahisasuramardini, the destroyer of the malevolent bull-demon, Mahisha. It depicts Durga as demon-queen Rangda sitting with her knees spread open, exposing her genitalia. A dog is shown licking the secretions of her exposed genitalia. Her right hand is placed on top of a person's head while her right foot stomps a bull on its head.

== See also ==
- Balinese temple

== Cited works ==
Auger, Timothy, ed. (2001). Bali & Lombok. Eyewitness Travel Guides. London: Dorling Kindersley. ISBN 0751368709.
