= Kubutambahan, Buleleng =

District in Bali, Indonesia

Kubutambahan is an adninistrative district (kecamatan) in the eastern part of the regency of Buleleng in northern Bali (Province), Indonesia.

Location within Buleleng

It contains a number of notable temples, including Pura Meduwe Karang.

== Towns and Villages ==
The district is sub-divided into 13 rural villages (desa) - all sharing the post code 81172 - as follows:

- 2001 Tambakan
- 2002 Pakisan
- 2003 Bontihing
- 2004 Iajun
- 2005 Tunjung
- 2006 Depeha
- 2007 Tamblang

- 2008 Bulian
- 2009 Bila
- 2010 Bengkala
- 2011 Kubutambahan
- 2012 Bukti
- 2013 Mengening

== See also ==
- Lake Batur
- Mount Batur
- Subak (irrigation)
- Tukad Daya
