= List of districts and sub-districts in Bangli Regency =

The following is a list of districts and administrative villages (rural desa and urban kelurahan) in Bangli Regency. The Regency has 4 districts, sub-divided into 4 urban villages, and 68 rural villages. In mid 2022, the population was officially estimated at 267,133 with an area of 520.8 km^{2} and an average density of 512.9 people per km^{2}.

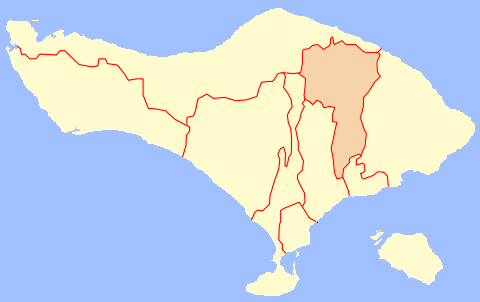
Map of Bangli Regency in Bali

Map of districts in Bangli Regency

List of districts and villages in Bangli Regency as follows:

Code	Districts	Urban villages	Rural villages	Status	List
51.06.02	Bangli	4	5	Rural villages	Bunutin; Kayubihi; Landih; Pengotan; Taman Bali
51.06.02	Bangli	4	5	Urban villages	Bebalang; Cempaga; Kawan; Kubu
51.06.04	Kintamani	-	48	Rural villages	Abangsongan; Abuan; Awan; Bantang; Banua; Batudinding; Batukaang; Batur Selatan; Batur Tengah; Batur Utara; Bayungcerik; Bayung Gede; Belancan; Belandingan; Belanga; Belantih; Binyan; Bonyoh; Buahan; Bunutin; Catur; Daup; Dausa; Gunungbau; Katung; Kedisan; Kintamani; Kutuh; Langgahan; Lembean; Mangguh; Manikliyu; Mengani; Pengejaran; Pinggan; Satra; Sekaan; Sekardadi; Selulung; Serai; Siakin; Songan A; Songan B; Subaya; Sukawana; Suter; Terunyan; Ulian
51.06.01	Susut	-	9	Rural villages	Abuan; Apuan; Demulih; Pengiangan; Penglumbaran; Selat; Sulahan; Susut; Tiga
51.06.03	Tembuku	-	6	Rural villages	Bangbang; Jehem; Peninjoan; Tembuku; Undisan; Yangapi
	TOTAL	4	68		
