= Kintamani (dog breed) =

Indonesian dog breed

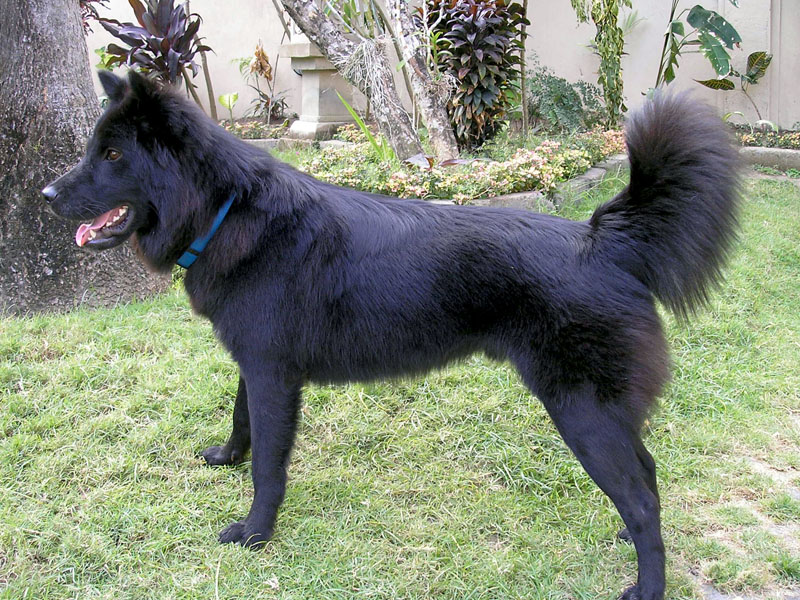
- black Kintamani
- Other names: Balinese Kintamani, Balinese Mountain Dog, Balinese Dog, Bali-Berghund, Anjing Kintamani-Bali, Kintamani-Bali Dog, Chien de Bali/Kintamani, Kintamani-Bali-Hund, Perro Kintamani-Bali
- Common nicknames: Kinta
- Origin: Indonesia
Traits
Height	Males	49–57 cm (19–22 in)
	Females	44–52 cm (17–20 in)
Weight	Males	15–18 kg (33–40 lb)
	Females	13–16 kg (29–35 lb)
- Coat: Medium, harsh and double coat with collar
- Color: White, fawn (beige), red, brindle, or black
Kennel club standards
- Fédération Cynologique Internationale: standard

The Kintamani (Indonesian: anjing kintamani; pronounced [ˌand͡ʒɪŋ kɪn̪t̪aˈmani]; Balinese: cicing kintamani), or the Kintamani-Bali Dog, is a dog breed native to the Indonesian island of Bali. Originally from the Kintamani region, it is a popular dog amongst residents on the island and the region's only official breed, having been developed from free-roaming local Bali street dogs. It was recognised by the Federation Cynologique Internationale (FCI) in 2019.

== Lineage ==
The ancestors of the historic Balinese street dogs arrived on the island around 3,000 years ago. A genetic study indicated that the Kintamani breed is genetically related to local island dogs found on Bali. In turn, the island's resident and stray dogs are most-closely aligned with the Australian dingo or the New Guinea singing dog, and more distantly-related to AKC-recognised breeds of Asian origin, but less to those of European origin.

In 1926, a rabies-control measure banned all foreign dogs admission onto the island; thus the dogs on Bali have bred within their own unique gene pool, having been refined for nearly one-hundred years since the passing of these policies

== Characteristics ==
The Kintamani looks something like a mix between a Samoyed and an Alaskan Malamute. They have long hair, a broad face, a flat forehead, and flat cheeks like Chinese dogs, such as the Chow Chow or Shar Pei. They are happy to live life as a pet or companion at the home, though many do not have formal owners or homes, and are routinely fed by good samaritans and locals. However, these dogs will live much of their lives out-of-doors, digging holes for shelter; some live in small caves among the boulders around Kintamani. Locally, they are considered "good-looking", attractive dogs, and quite desirable as pets. The Kintamani dog is gentle around people, yet retains enough assertive behavior to render it a noteworthy, but not vicious, watchdog.

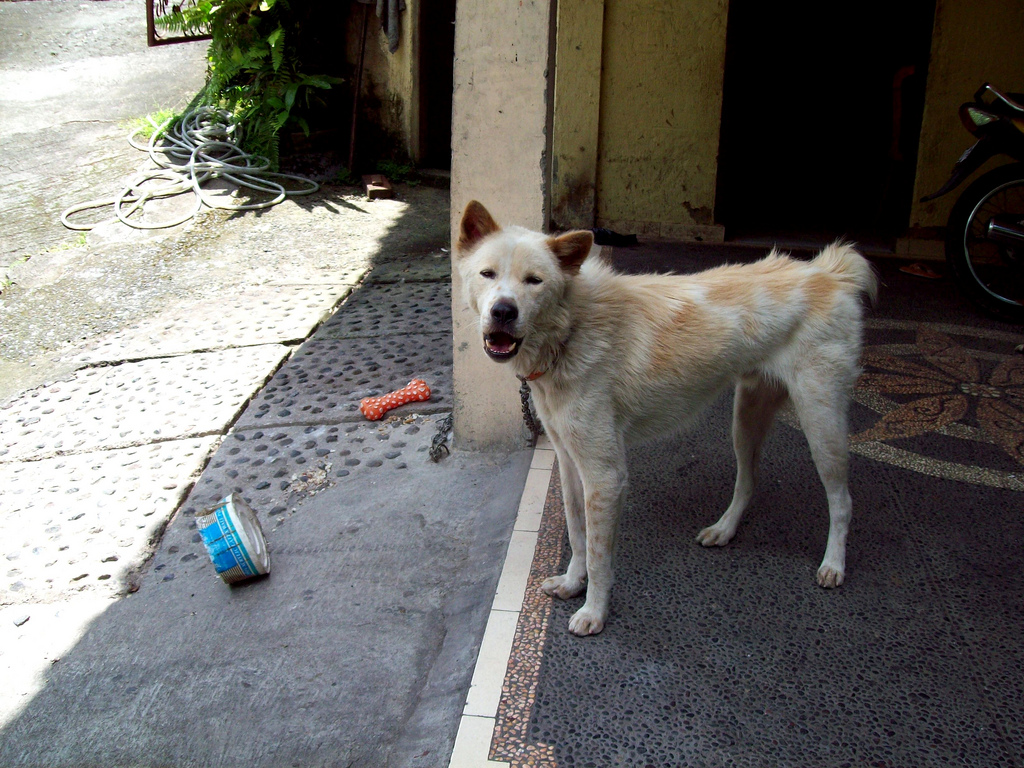
7–8 year-old Kintamani

The most desirable coat color is white, preferably with apricot-tipped ears. Breeders often confine the dogs to colder, dark caves near the Kintamani volcano, insisting it an essential step in developing the thick white coat. The FCI standard also accepts fawn (beige), red, brindle, and black coats. In fawn, red, and brindle variations, the black mask is preferred.

The withers height of the female Kintamani dog is 44–52 centimeters (17–20 inches), 49–57 centimeters (19–22 inches) for the male, about the same as the stature of the Bali street dog. The desired physical traits of the Kintamani dog include erect ears, forwardly curved tail held at the midline, medium to longhaired coat, almond-shaped brown eyes, and black skin pigment.

Bali street dogs come in many colors and coat patterns, and they are almost always shorthaired and straight- to curve- tailed. Both still whelp in burrows dug into the earth, a feral dog trait.

=== Temperament ===
A fiercely-independent breed, Kintamanis can be aggressively territorial while at the same time tender and affectionate with their own families. While most dog breeds are averse to climbing or heights, Kintamanis will climb across roofs, trees, or spend parts of the day happily seated or sleeping atop a garden wall; this arboreal nature is a likely inheritance from the New Guinea singing dog, a very active and arboreal type of canine. The Kintamani are light-footed and move freely, smoothly and lithely, and will alert or bark when confronted with an unfamiliar sound or sight.

== Accreditation ==
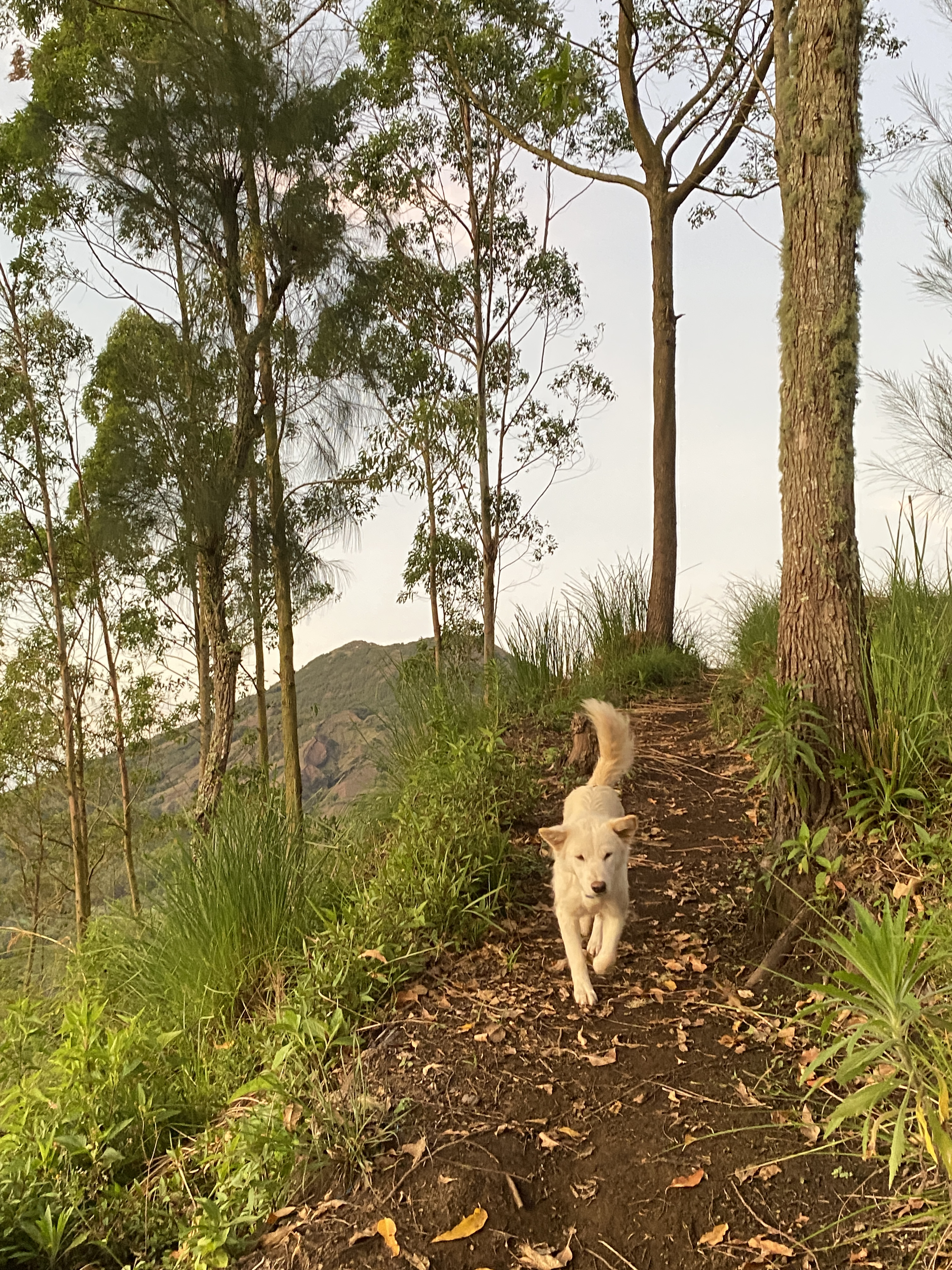
Kintamani dog in Kintamani

The Bangli Regency authority facilitates the Kintamani Dog Exhibition and Contest every year to promote the Kintamani Dog. The authority also guides Kintamani breeders, sets rules on Kintamani breed standards, and has made a demonstration pilot project in some villages.

== See also ==
- List of dog breeds
