= Sukasada, Buleleng =

District in Buleleng Regency, Bali Province, Indonesia

Sukasada
- District (kecamatan)
- Location of Sukasada within Buleleng
- Interactive map of Sukasada
- Country: Indonesia
- Province: Bali
- Regency: Buleleng
- Villages: 14 rural villages (desa) plus the urban village (kelurahan) of Sukasada

Area
  - Total: 160.94 km^{2} (62.14 sq mi)

Population (2025)
  - Total: 95,982
  - Density: 596.38/km^{2} (1,544.6/sq mi)
- Postal code: 81161

Sukasada is an administrative district (kecamatan) in the regency of Buleleng in northern Bali, Indonesia. It lies immediately south of the town of Singaraja, and covers an area of 160.94 km^{2}, with a population of 95,982 in mid 2025.

Location within Buleleng

== Towns and Villages ==
The district is sub-divided into the town (kelurahan) of Sukasada and 14 rural illages (desa) - all sharing the post code 81161 - as follows:

- 2001 Pancasari
- 2002 Wanagiri
- 2003 Ambengan
- 2004 Gitgit
- 2005 Pegayaman
- 2006 Silangjana
- 2007 Pegadungan
- 2008 Badangbulia

- 1009 Sukasada
- 2010 Sambangan
- 2011 Panji
- 2012 Panji Anom
- 2013 Tegal Linggah
- 2014 Selat
- 2015 Kayuputih

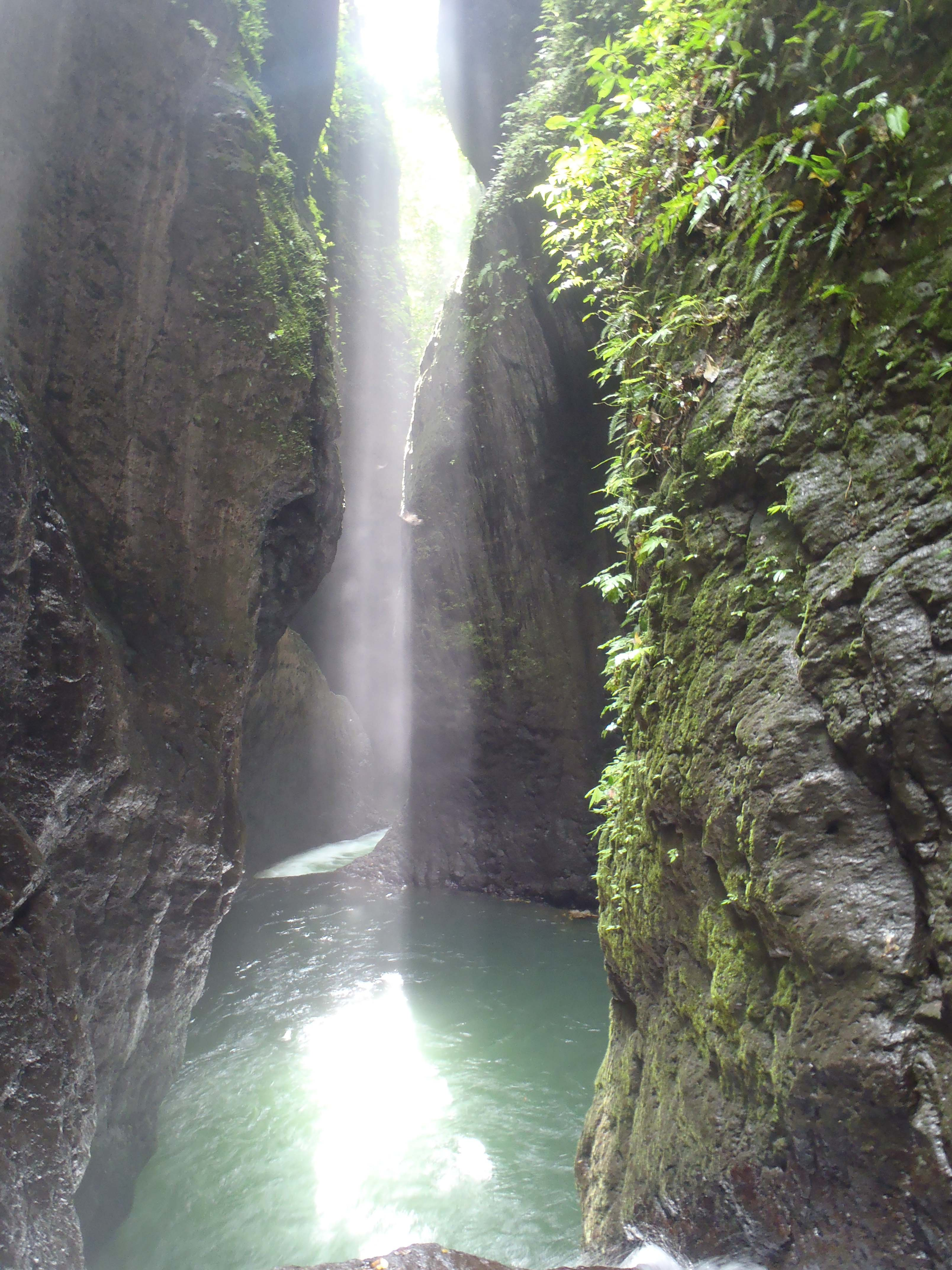
Aling Gorge, between Tagal Linggah (south) and Pangi Anom (north)
