= Sumberkima =

Village in Buleleng Regency, Bali, Indonesia

Coordinates: 8°08′00″S 114°37′01″E

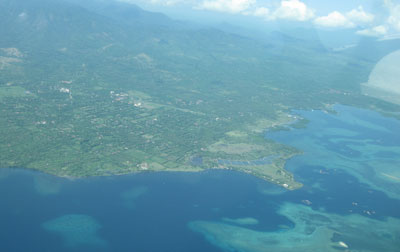
Sky-view of Sumberkima village, including Lt.Col. Wisnu Airfield

Sumberkima Village (Indonesian: Desa Sumberkima) is a small settlement, located in west Buleleng Regency, in the north-west corner of Bali island, a Province of the Indonesian archipelago.

== Economy ==
Sumberkima settlement’s economy is heavily reliant on hospitality business, employment and supply of primary produce to the multiple tourist resorts located along the coast in the area. Fishing, fish-farming, tobacco and rice cultivating is a prevailing agricultural sector. A new source of income was introduced in 2001 with the construction of Lt.Col. Wisnu Airfield. The airfield was planned to increase a flow of tourism to this remote area of Bali. The airfield and surrounding installations are also home to Bali International Flight Academy, training airline cadets for various airlines, including the national Garuda Airlines carrier.

== Culture and Religion ==
Prevailing Hindu Balinese culture. Almost unspoiled by an overwhelming tourism sector in the south of Bali. Beautiful influence of Islamic migration from neighboring Java island. Multiple Balinese Hindu temples in the area, including a small public temple in the mountainous region of the village, accompanied by a large number of personal family shrines. Islamic influence in the region is indicated by a recently constructed mosque in the northern part of Sumberkima.

== Entertainment ==
Several restaurants, PADI-approved diving centers, fishing/snorkeling trip shops are located along the main road. Several hotels and resorts, offering quiet accommodation for couples. Many offer Balinese dancers as a part of their holiday venue. Night-life, bars and clubs are available in the "Lovina" resort region, approx 45 km to the East of Sumberkima and Singaraja city.
