= Lake Tamblingan =

Lake in Bali, Indonesia

- ᬤᬦᬸᬢᬫ᭄ᬩᭂᬮᬶᬗᬦ᭄ (Balinese)
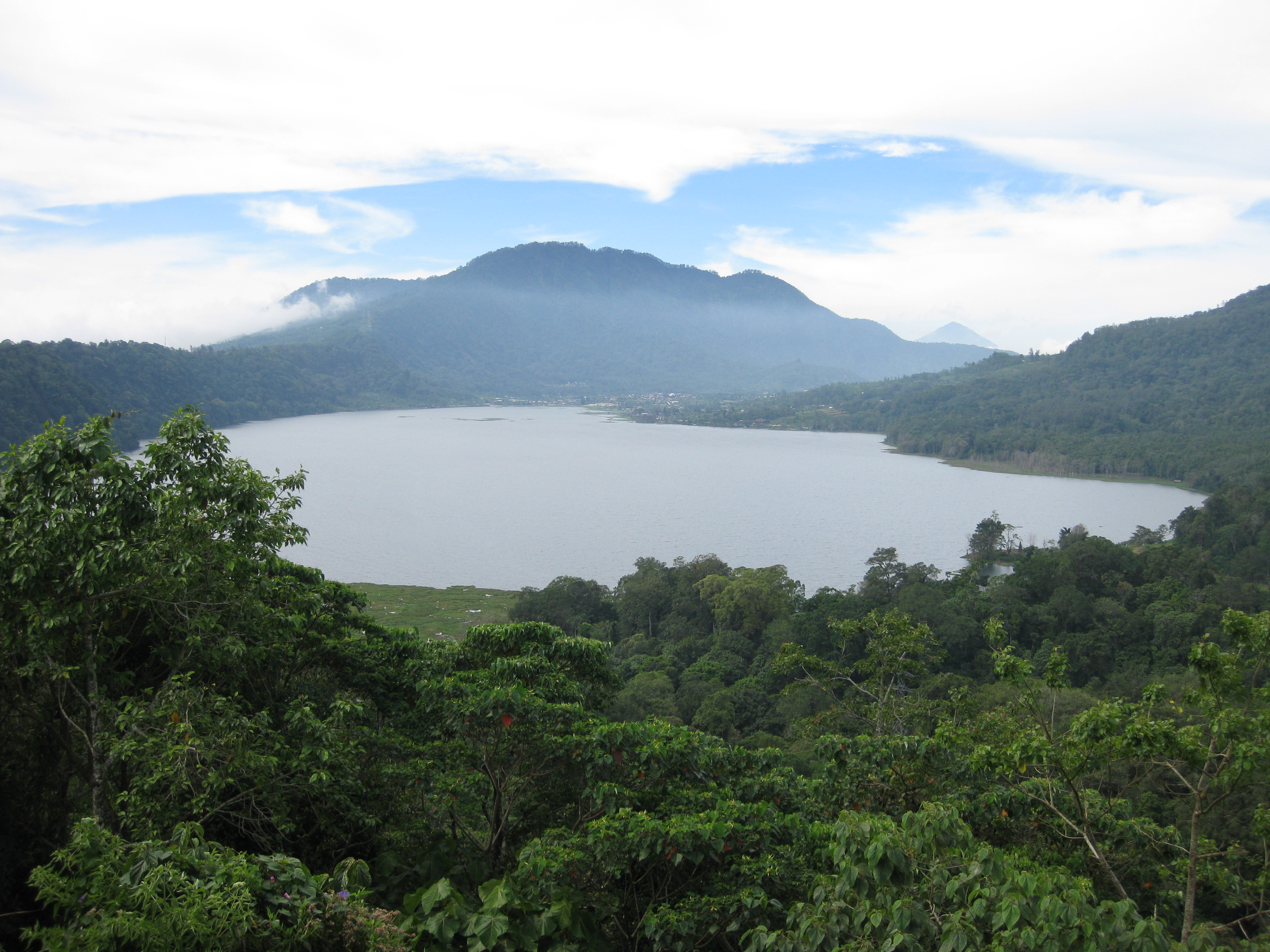
- Lake Tamblingan in Buleleng Regency, Bali

- Location within Indonesia
- Location: Buleleng Regency, Bali, Indonesia
- Coordinates: 8.257056°S 115.097003°E
- Type: caldera lake
- Basin countries: Indonesia
- Max. length: 2 km (1.2 mi)
- Max. width: 1.1 km (0.68 mi)
- Surface area: 1.6 km^{2} (0.62 sq mi)
- Max. depth: 90 m (300 ft)
- Water volume: 0.027 km^{3} (0.0065 cu mi)
- Surface elevation: 1,217 m (3,993 ft)
- Settlements: Gubug village

Lake Tamblingan (Balinese: Danu Tamblingan ᬤᬦᬸᬢᬫ᭄ᬩᭂᬮᬶᬗᬦ᭄, Indonesian: Danau Tamblingan) is a caldera lake located in Buleleng Regency, Bali. The lake is located at the foot of Mount Lesung in Munduk administrative village, Banjar district, Buleleng Regency, Bali, Indonesia. The lake is one of the three lakes that formed inside an ancient caldera, the other lakes to the east of Lake Tamblingan are Lake Buyan and Lake Bratan. Tamblingan lake is a pristine lake surrounded with dense rainforest and archaeological remnants of the 10th-century Tamblingan civilization. The lake and the surrounding settlements is designated as a spiritual tourism area protected from modern development by the government.

== Description ==
Lake Tamblingan lies in a plateau inside an ancient volcanic caldera. Inside the caldera are several dormant ancient volcanoes and other caldera lakes to the east of Lake Tamblingan: Lake Buyan and Lake Bratan. Lake Tamblingan is the smallest lake inside the caldera. The lake location, over a 1000 meter high plateau, gives it an alpine climate. Pristine rainforest with orchids and macaques covers the shore of Lake Tamblingan. Only one village exists on the shore of Lake Tamblingan, the village of Gubug, at the southern shore of the lake.

The water level of Lake Tamblingan changes depending on the intensity of the rainy season. During intense rain period, some temples along the shore can get inundated.

A. Lake Tamblingan, B. Lake Buyan, C. Lake Beratan

== History ==
Lake Tamblingan is surrounded with many ancient Balinese temples (puras). The many temples surrounding the lake are associated with the ancient Tamblingan civilization. Tamblingan is first mentioned in a ca. AD 900 copper inscription as a settlement located on the southern shore of Tamblingan Lake. This copper inscription was discovered in the village of Gobleg, another ancient village located near Munduk. The ancient temple Pura Dalem Tamblingan is still maintained today, located on the southern shore of Lake Tamblingan in what is now a small village of Gubug.

Due to an unknown reason, the people from the original Tamblingan village migrated to four different places in the vicinity of the lake, creating new villages collectively known as Catur Desa ("four villages"). These villages are Munduk, Gobleg, Gesing, and Umejero. The four villages shared the similar spiritual belief, that is to maintain the sanctity of the lake Tamblingan. Temples were established along the lake Tamblingan to honor the gods.

== Temples ==
Many small-sized ancient temples dot the area on the shore of the lake and the vicinity. The principal temple Pura Dalem Tamblingan, located on the eastern shore of the lake, was first mentioned in the 10th-century, as recorded by a copper inscriptions found in Gobleg. Among the other temples that are probably established in the same period are Pura Embang and Pura Tukang Timbang. A dalem temple, as in Pura Dalem Tamblingan, is a temple which is associated with death and the passing of things. Dalem temples are traditionally erected at the southern (kelod) end of a Balinese village.

Other notable temples are Pura Ulun Danu Tamblingan which is located on the southern shore of the lake near the village of Gubug, Pura Pekemitan Kangin located on the ridge overlooking the isthmus separating Lake Tamblingan with Lake Buyan, and Pura Dalem Gubug located to the southeast of the lake. Other temples surrounding the lake are Pura Endek, Pura Tirta Mengening, Pura Naga Loka, Pura Pengukiran, Pengukusan, and Pura Batulepang.

== See also ==
- Lake Bratan
- List of drainage basins of Indonesia

== Cited works ==
- Auger, Timothy, ed. (2001). Bali & Lombok. Eyewitness Travel Guides. London: Dorling Kindersley. ISBN 0751368709.
- Ottersen, Carl (2016). The Great Guide to Bali: For Tablets. Great Guides. Folkestone: No Trees Publishing.
- Surya, D. (2012). Bali dan Sekitarnya [Bali and Surrounding] (in Indonesian). ISBN 9781480078611.
