= Kintamani, Bali =

Kintamani ᬓᬶᬦ᭄ᬢᬫᬦᬶ
- District
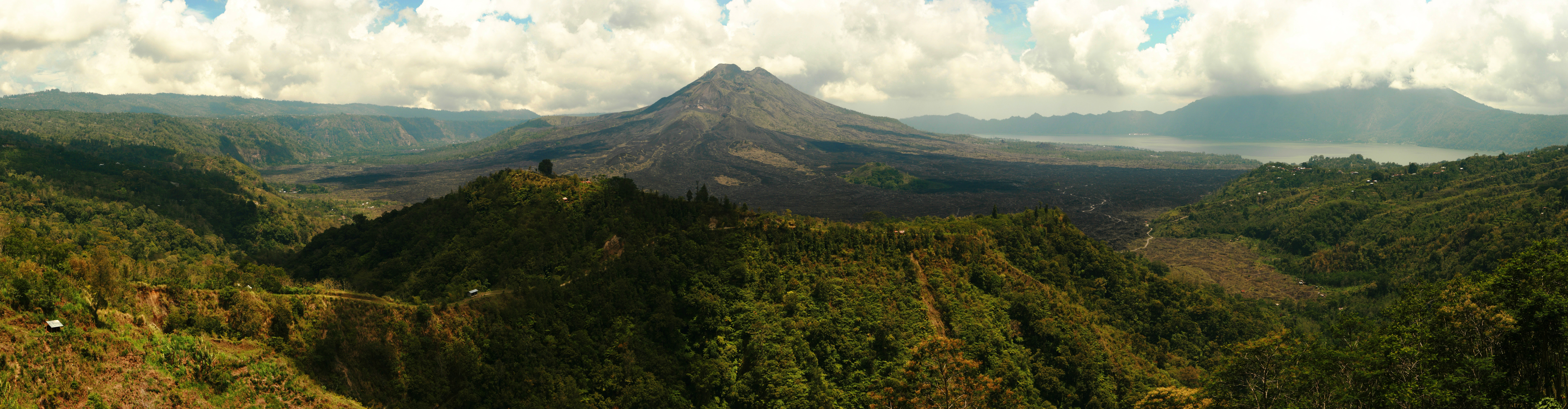
- Mount Batur seen from Kintamani

- Location with Bali province
- Coordinates: 8°15′29″S 115°19′43″E
- Country: Indonesia
- Province: Bali
- Regency: Bangli

Area
  - Total: 141.7 sq mi (366.9 km^{2})
  - Density: 794/sq mi (306.5/km^{2})

Demographics
  - Ethnic groups: Balinese; Bali Aga
  - Religion: Hinduism (Balinese Hinduism • folk Hinduism)
  - Languages: Indonesian (official); Balinese (native); — Lowland Balinese; — Bali Aga Balinese
- Time zone: Indonesia Central Time
- Postal code: 80652

Kintamani (Balinese: ᬓᬶᬦ᭄ᬢᬫᬦᬶ) is a district (kecamatan), and a village within that district, on the western edge of the larger caldera wall of the Mount Batur (Gunung Batur) caldera in Bali, Indonesia. It is on the same north–south road as Penelokan and has been used as a stopping place to view the Mount Batur region. Kintamani is also known for Pura Tuluk Biyu's 1,000-year-old "Rites of Peace" stone tablets and the Kintamani dog breed. It is situated next to Mount Batur. Kintamani is mainly inhabited by the native Balinese people, Bali Aga.

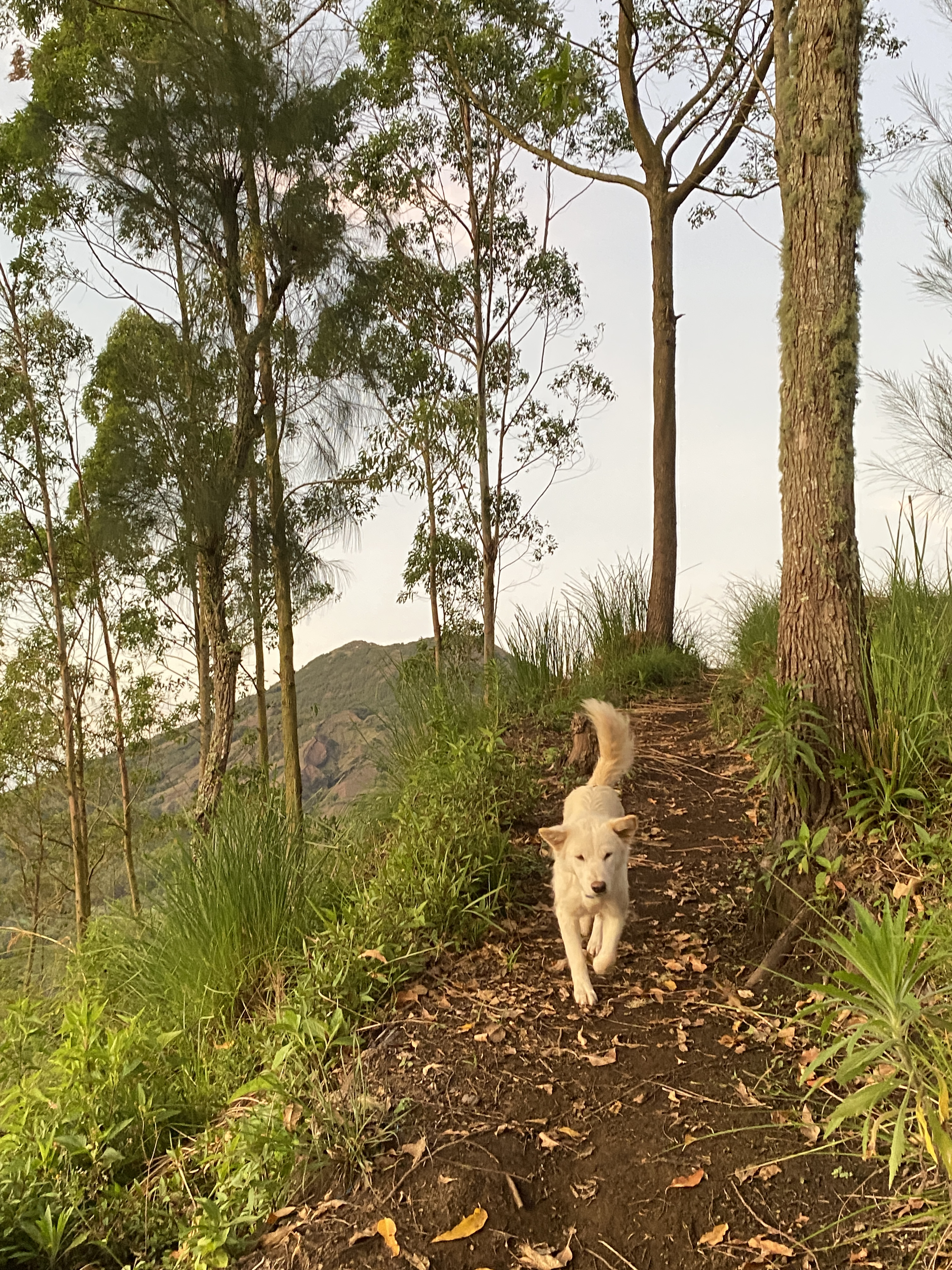
Kintamani dog around Mount Batur in Kintamani

Kintamani District covers a greater land area than the city of Denpasar at 366.9 km^{2}, and it was home to 112,463 people at the 2020 Census, but the area is rural, with only 7,402 people in 2010 in the administrative village of 19.45 km^{2} which has grown along the single main road. Altogether there are 48 villages (desa) in the district.

The Kintamani district includes 19 Bali Aga villages, disseminated at the foot of mount Batur, along lake Batur and in the valleys.

== See also ==
- Lake Batur
- Subak (irrigation)
- Tukad Daya
