= History of Bali =

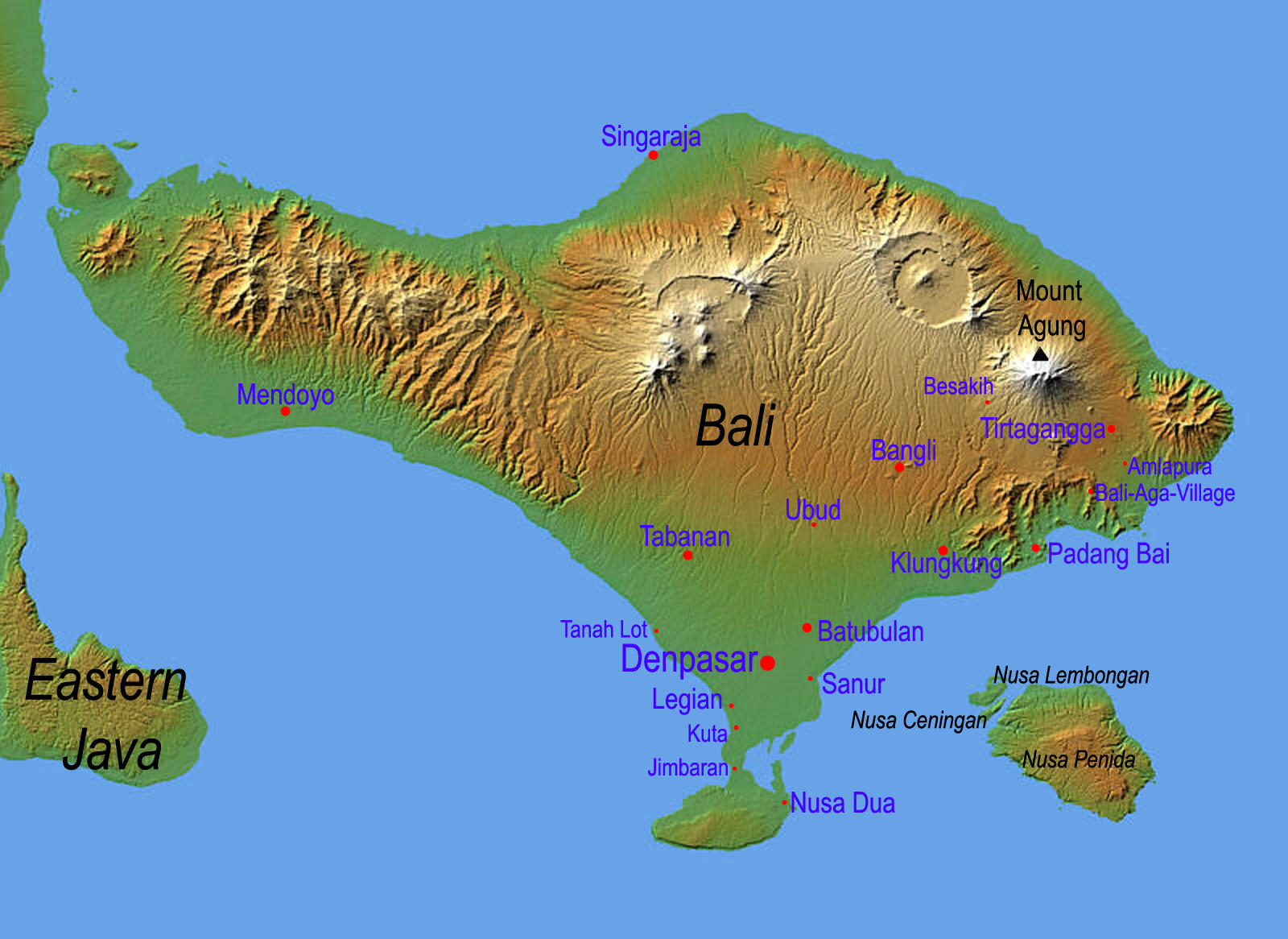
Map of Bali

The History of Bali covers a period from the Paleolithic to the present, and is characterized by migrations of people and cultures from other parts of Asia. In the 16th century, the history of Bali started to be marked by Western influence with the arrival of Europeans, to become, after a long and difficult colonial period under the Dutch, an example of the preservation of traditional cultures and a key tourist destination.

== Geological formation ==
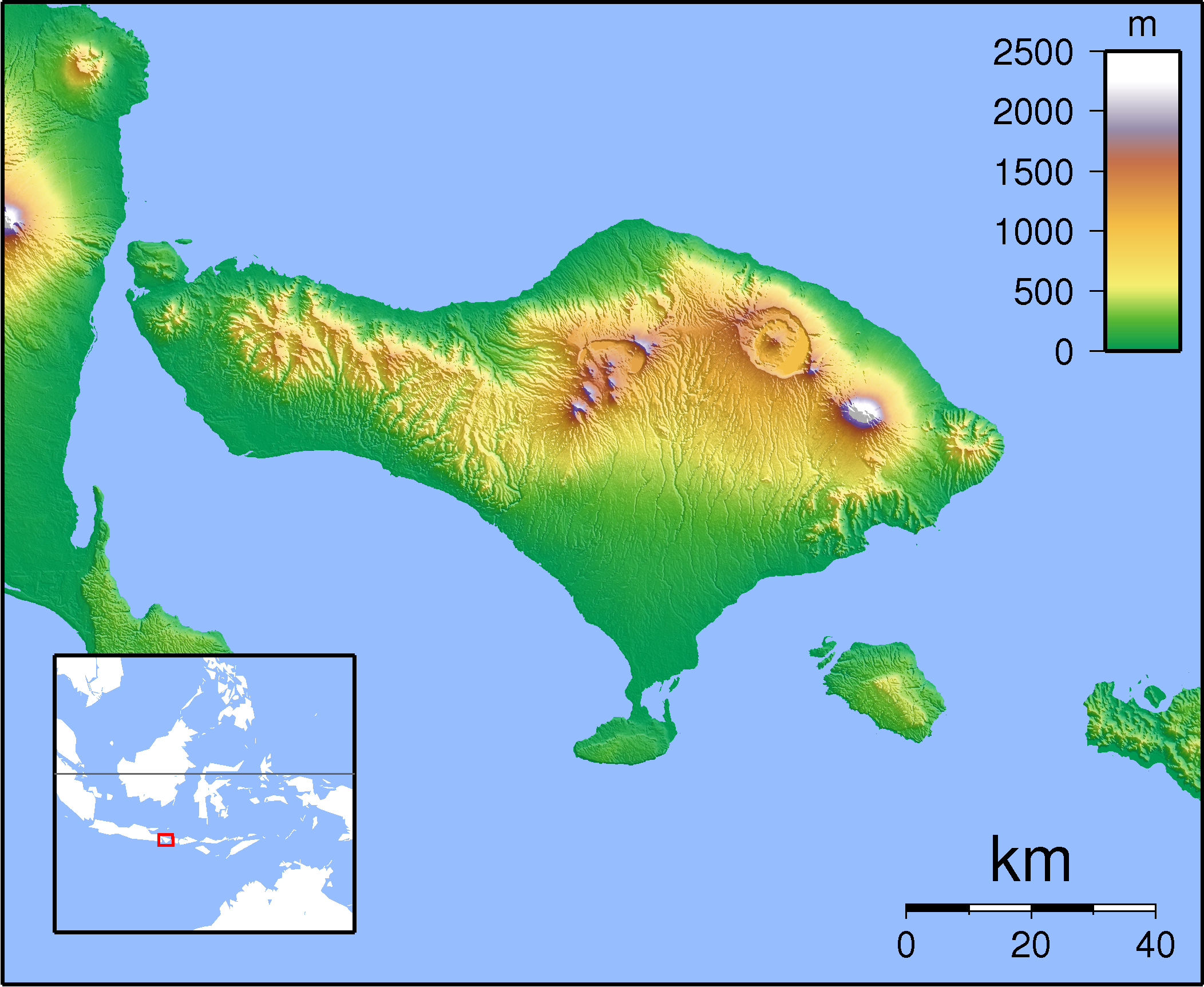
Bali, and location in the Indonesian archipelago

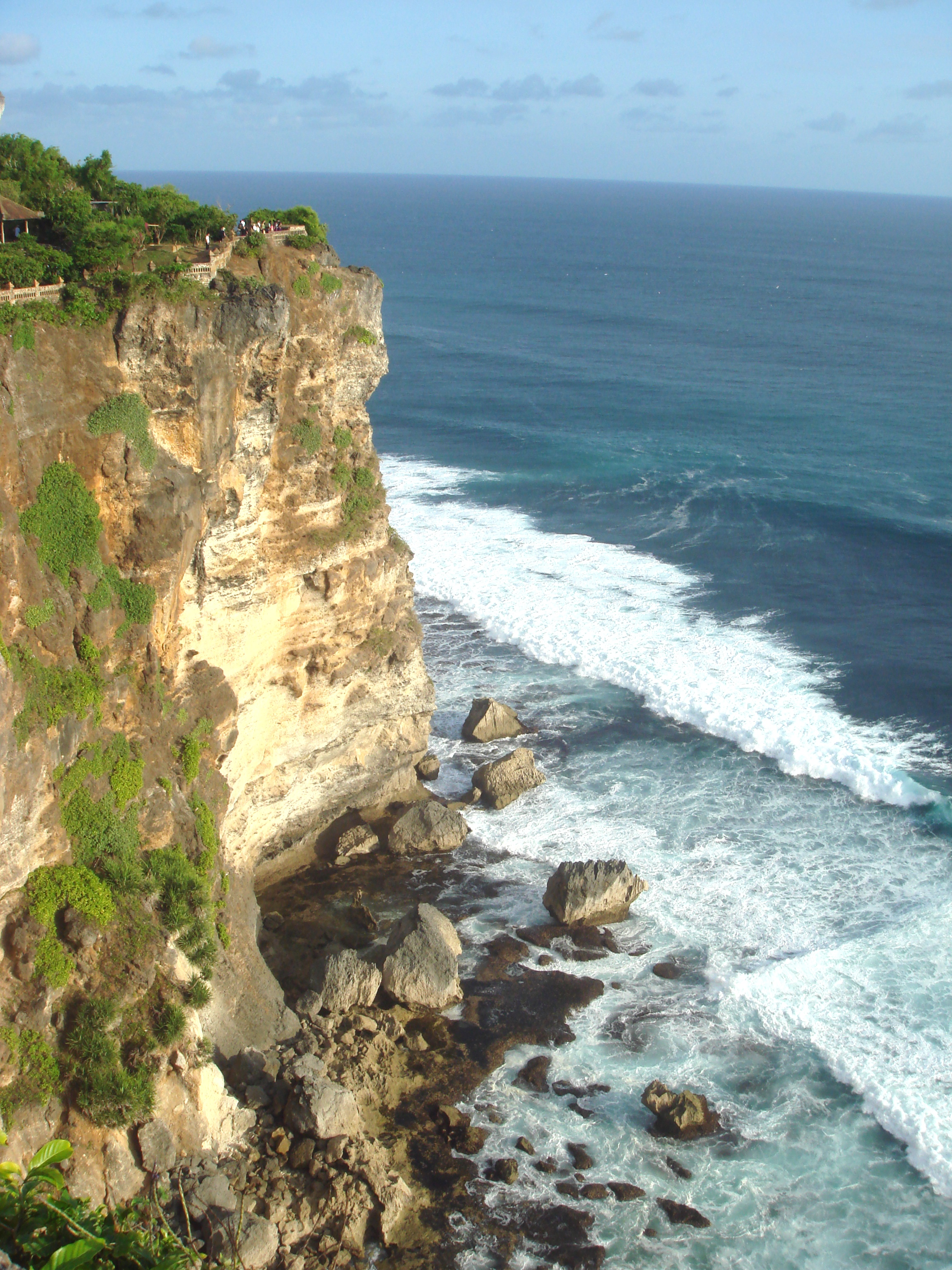
The Tertiary limestone cliffs of Uluwatu were lifted from the sea floor by subduction.

The island of Bali, like most of the islands of the Indonesian archipelago, is the result of the tectonic subduction of the Indo-Australian Plate under the Eurasian Plate. The tertiary ocean floor, made of ancient marine deposits including accumulation of coral reefs, was lifted above the sea level by the subduction. Layers of Tertiary limestone lifted from the ocean floor are still visible in areas such as the Bukit peninsula with the huge limestone cliffs of Uluwatu, or in the northwest of the island at Prapat Agung.

The local deformation of the Eurasian plate created by the subduction has encouraged the fissuring of the crust, leading to the arising of volcanic phenomena. A string of volcanoes line the northern part of the island, along a west–east axis in which the western part is oldest, and the eastern part newest. The highest volcano is the active strato-volcano Mount Agung, at 3,142 m (10,308 ft).

Volcanic activity has been intense through the ages, and most of the surface of the island (outside of the Bukit Peninsula and Prapat Agung) has been covered by volcanic magma. Some old deposits remain (older than 1 million years), while most of the central part of the island is covered by young volcanic deposits (less than 1 million years), with some very recent lava fields in the northeast due to the catastrophic eruption of Mount Agung in 1963.

Volcanic activity, due to the thick deposits of ashes and the soil fertility it generates, has also been a strong factor in the agricultural prosperity of the island.

At the edge of the subduction, Bali is also at the edge of the continental Sunda shelf, just west of the Wallace line, and was at one time connected to the neighbouring island of Java, particularly during the lowering of the sea level in the ice ages. Its fauna and flora are therefore Asian.

== Paleolithic and Mesolithic occupation ==
Bali being part of the Sunda shelf, the island had been connected to the island of Java many times through history. Even today, the two islands are only separated by the 2.4 km Bali Strait.

The ancient occupation of Java itself is accredited by the findings of the Java Man, dated between 1.7 and 0.7 million years old, one of the first known specimens of Homo erectus.

Bali also was inhabited in Paleolithic times (1 my BCE to 200,000 BCE), testified by the finding of ancient tools such as hand axes which were found in Sembiran and Trunyan villages in Bali.

A Mesolithic period (200,000–30,000 BCE) has also been identified, characterised by advanced food gathering and hunting, but still by Homo Erectus. This period yields more sophisticated tools, such as arrow points, and also tools made of animal or fish bones. They lived in temporary caves, such as those found in the Pecatu hills of the Badung regency, such as the Selanding and the Karang Boma caves. The first wave of Homo Sapiens arrived around 45,000 BCE as the Australoid people migrated south, replacing Homo Erectus.

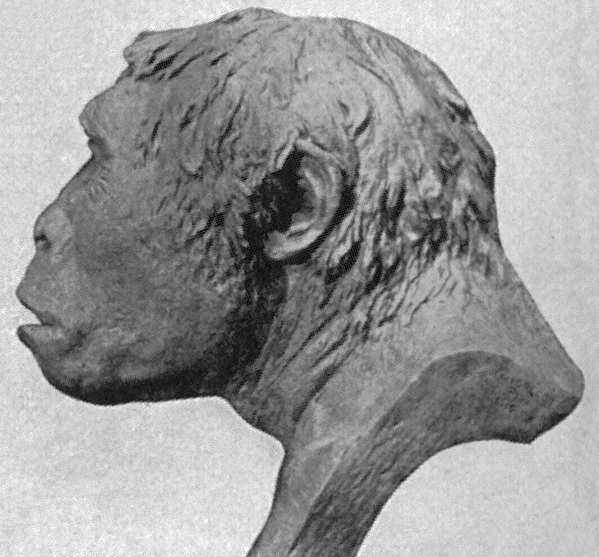
Java Man reconstitution.

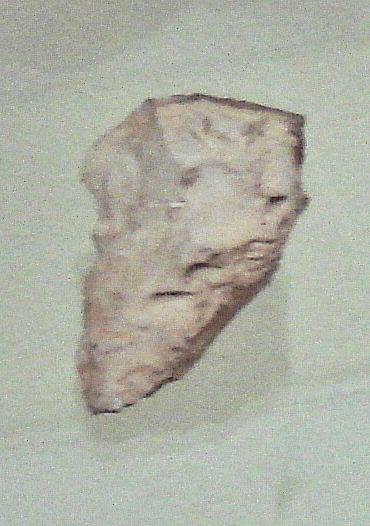
Mesolithic arrow point, Bali Museum

== Neolithic: Austronesian migrations (3000–600 BCE) ==
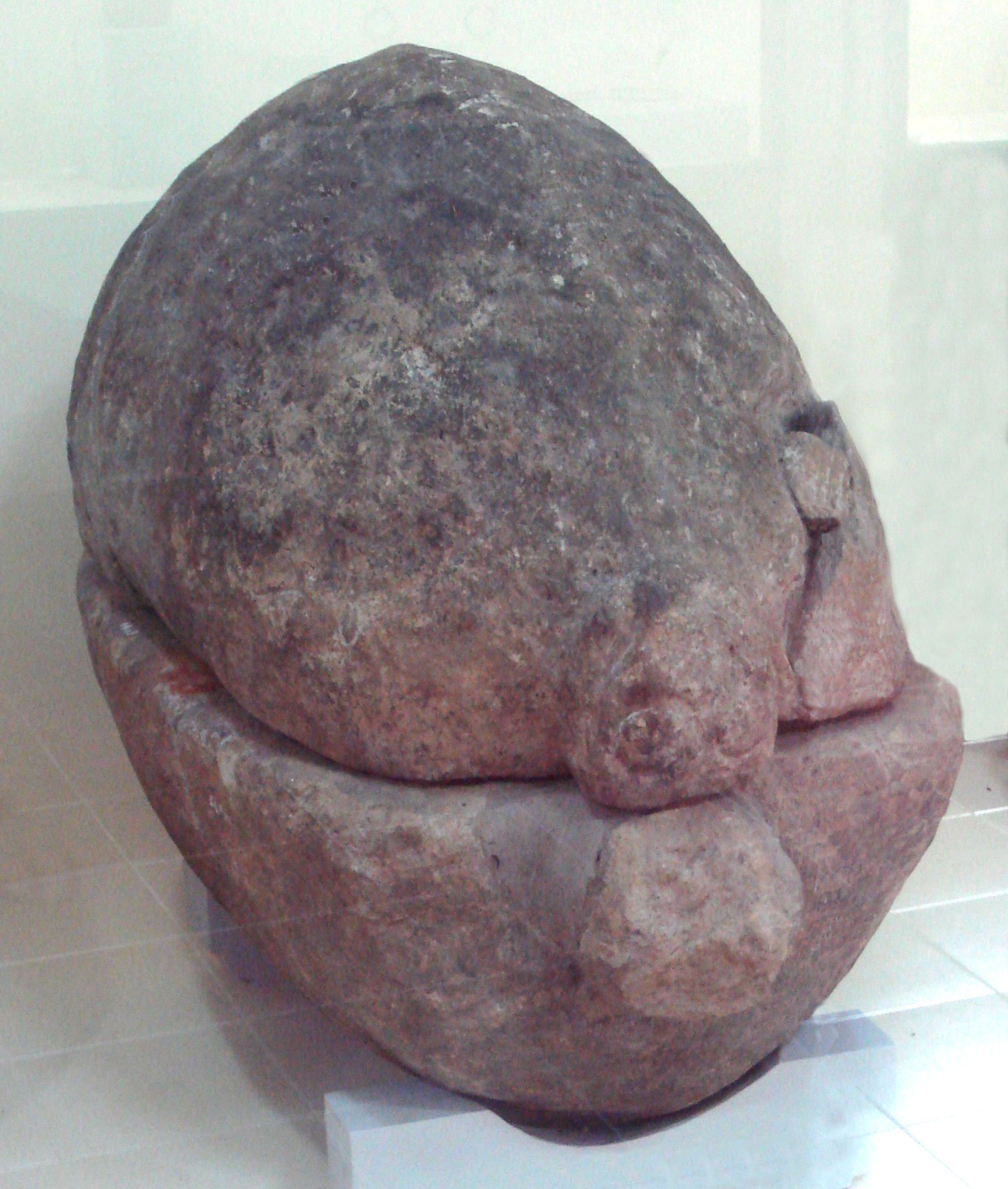
Neolithic stone sarcophagus, Bali Museum.

From around 3000 to 600 BCE, a Neolithic culture emerges, characterized by a new wave of inhabitants bringing rice-growing technology and speaking Austronesian languages. These Austronesian peoples seem to have migrated from South China, probably through the Philippines and Sulawesi. Their tools included rectangular adzes and red slipped decorated pottery.

Forests and jungles were cleared for the establishment of cultures and villages. They also made some plaited craft and a small boat was also found. Their culinary habits included pork-eating and betel-chewing. They are thought to have focused on mountain cults. They buried some of their more prestigious dead in oval stone sarcophagi, with human heads or zoomorphic figures sculpted on them. The bodies were either deposited in the sleeping position, or folded in two or three for compactness.

An important neolithic archaeological site in Bali is that of Cekik, in the western part of the island.

These same Austronesian people are thought to have continued their expansion eastward, to occupy Melanesian and Polynesian islands around 2000 years ago. The cultural traits of this period are still clearly visible in the culture of Bali today, and connect it to the cultures of Southeast Asia and the Pacific Ocean.

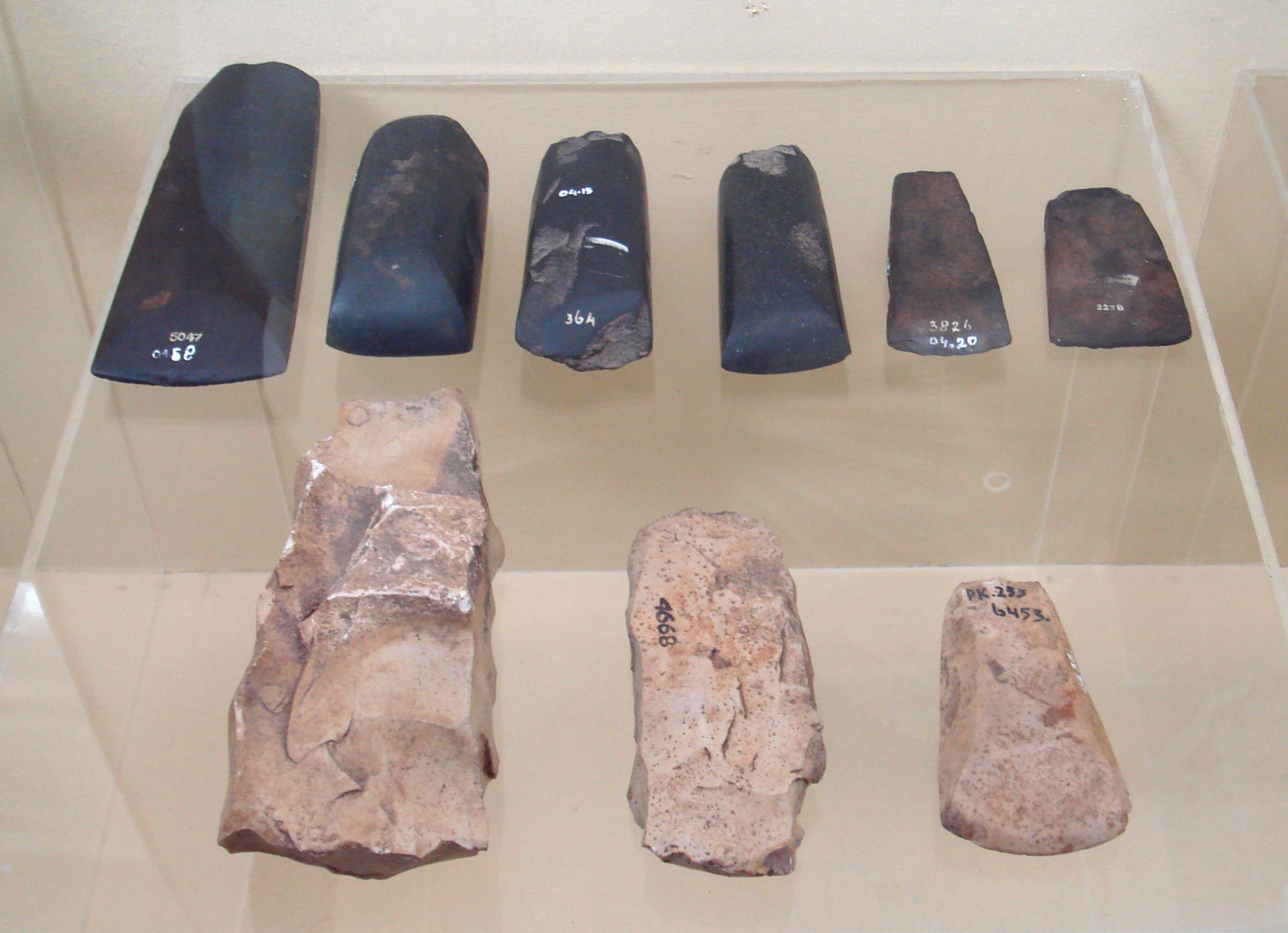
Neolithic stone tools, Bali

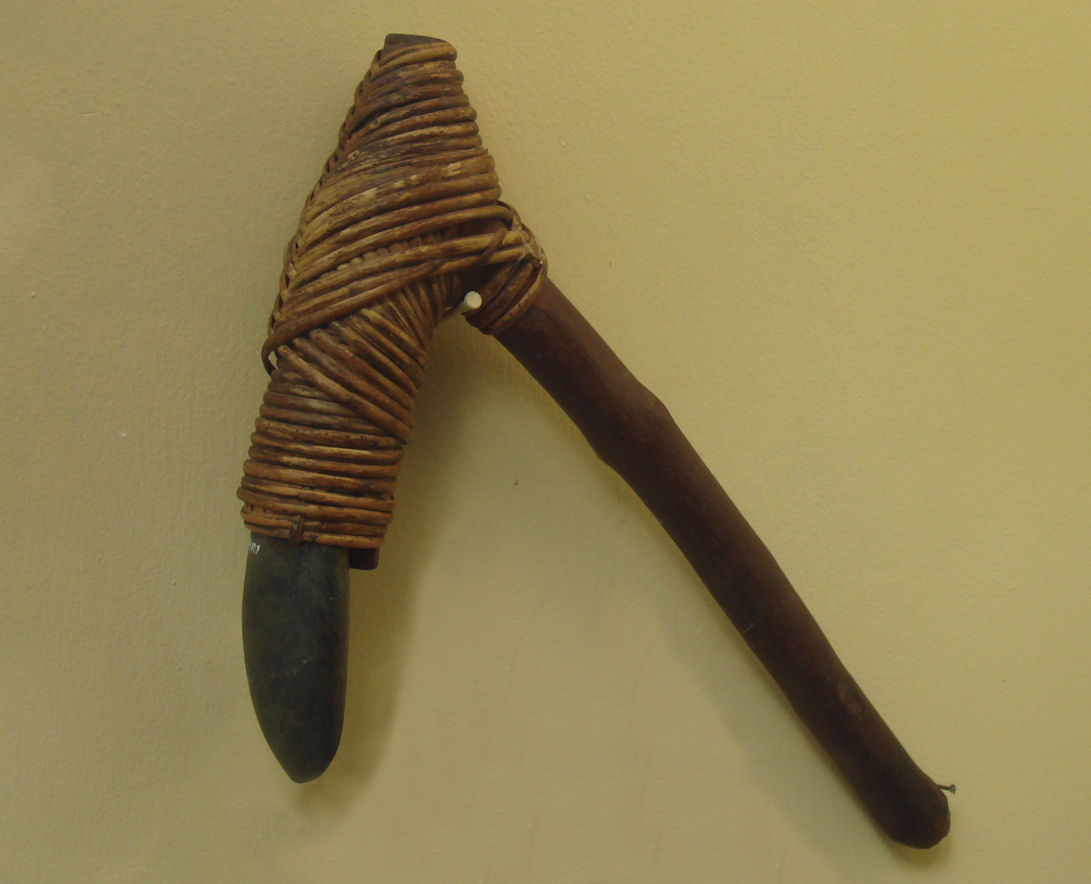
Neolithic cultivation tool reconstitution, Bali

== Bronze Age: arrival of Dong Son culture (600 BCE–800 CE) ==
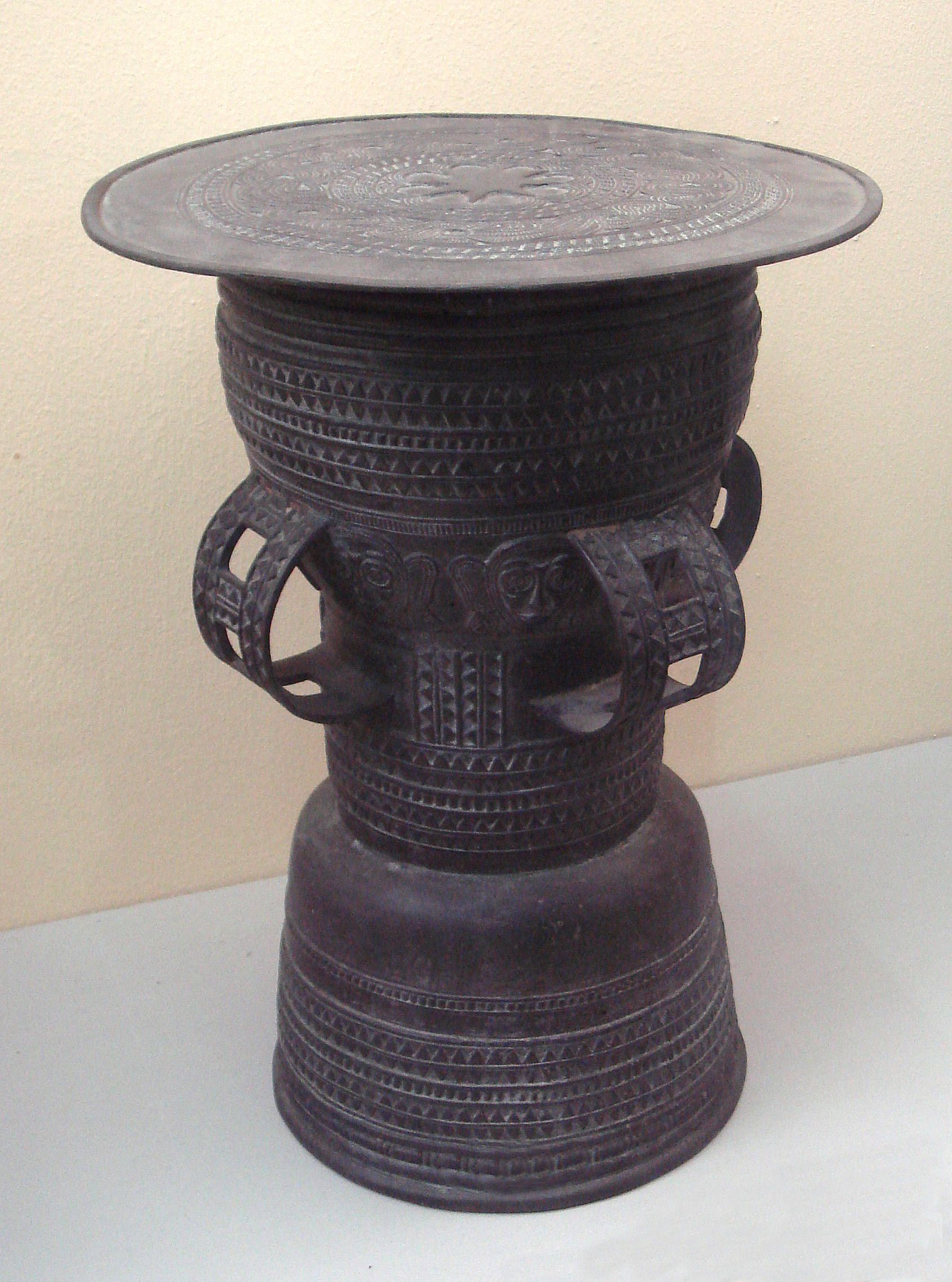
Bronze Age ceremonial drum, Bali.

A Bronze Age period follows, from around 600 BCE to 800 CE. Between the 8th and 3rd century BCE, the island of Bali acquired the "Dong Son" metallurgical techniques spreading from Northern Vietnam. These techniques involved sophisticated casting from moulds, with spiral and anthropomorphic motifs. As mould fragments have been found in the area of Manuaba in Bali, it is thought that such implements were manufactured locally rather than imported. The raw material to make bronze (copper and tin) had to be imported however, as it is not available on Bali.

Numerous bronze tools and weapons were made (axes, cooking tools, jewellery), and ceremonial drums from that period are also found in abundance, such as the "Moon of Pejeng", the largest ceremonial drum yet found in Southeast Asia, dated to around 300 BCE.

The stone sarcophagi were still in use during that period, as bronze artefacts were also found in them.

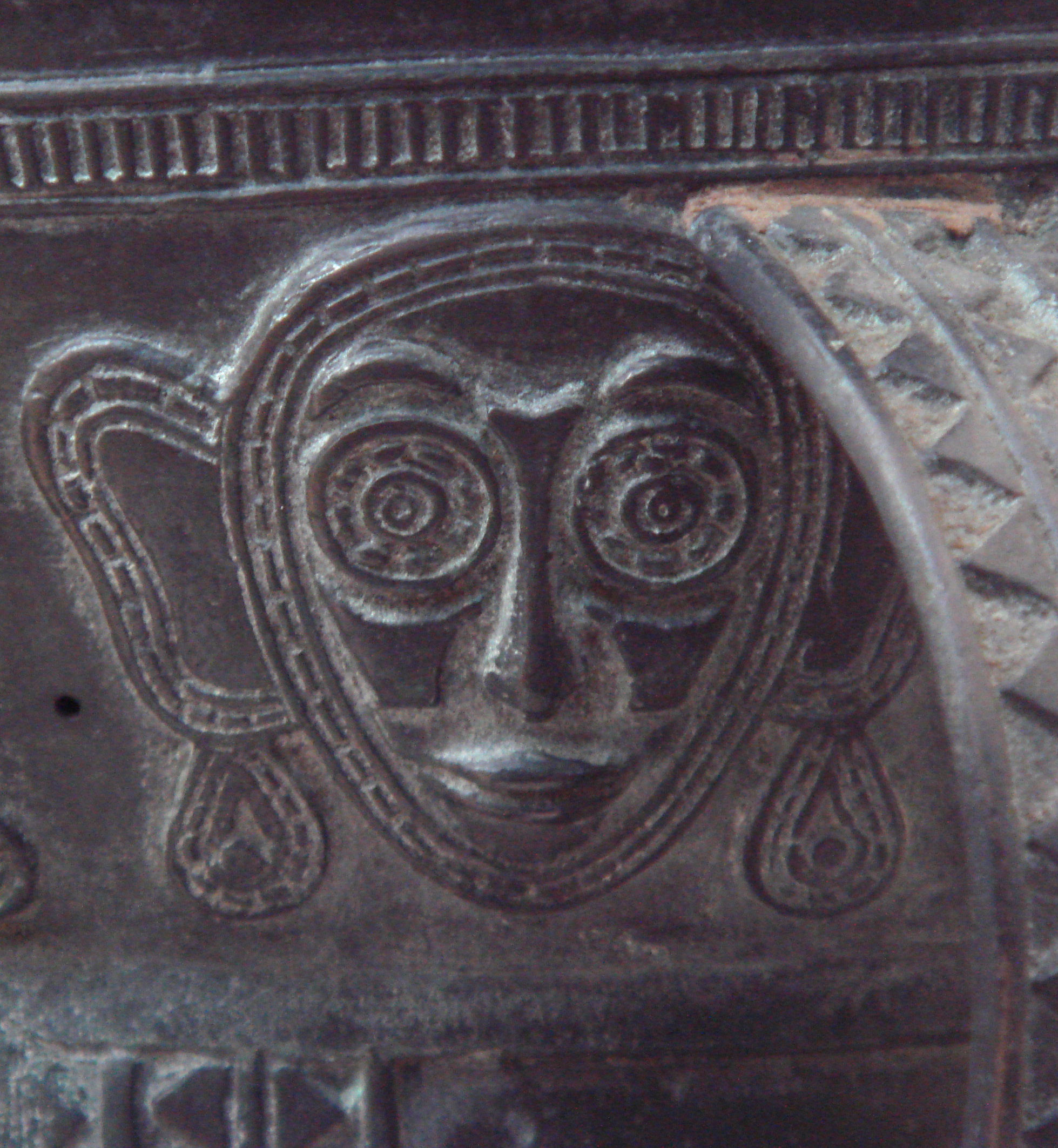
Anthropomorphic design on Bronze Age drum, Bali

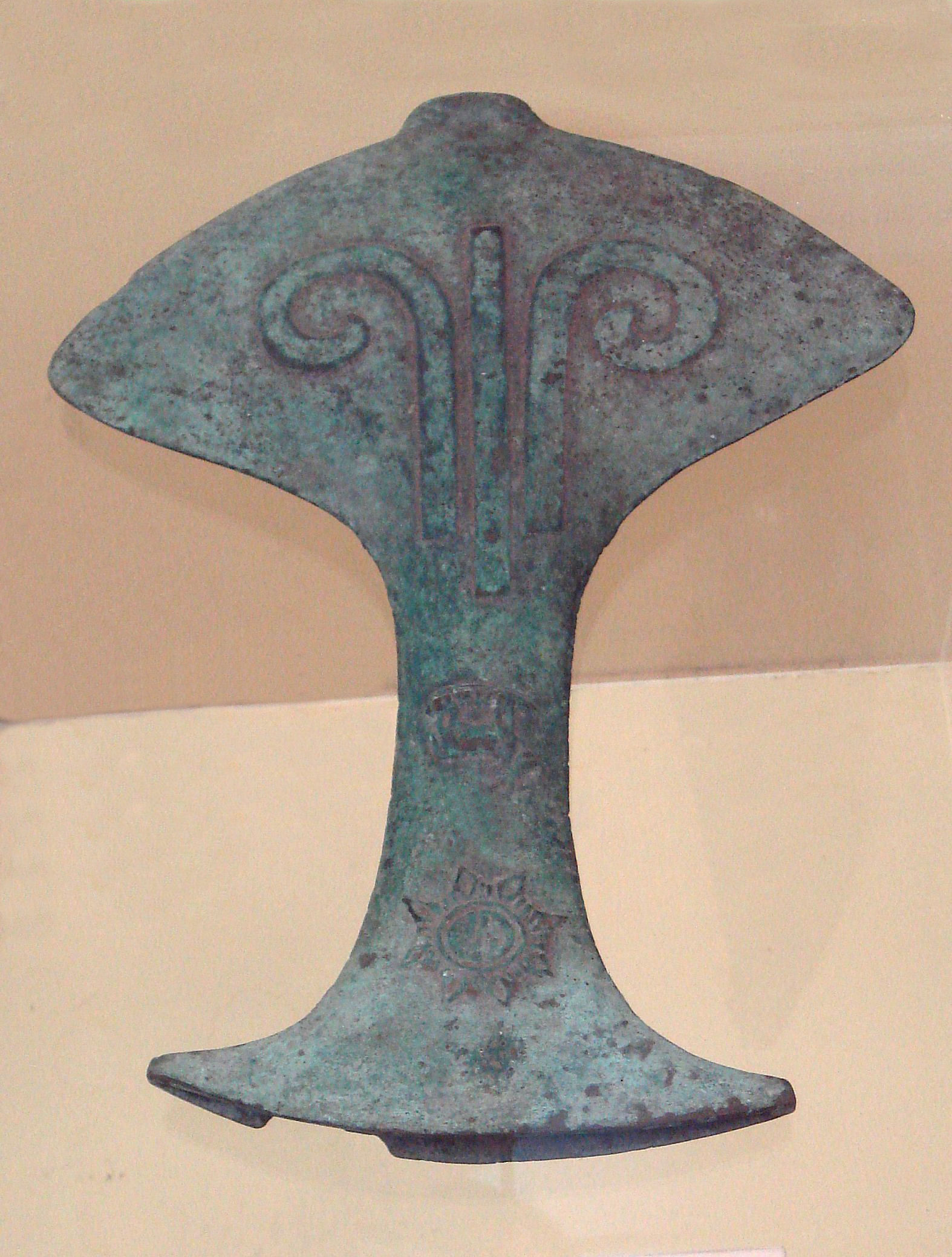
Bronze Age spear.

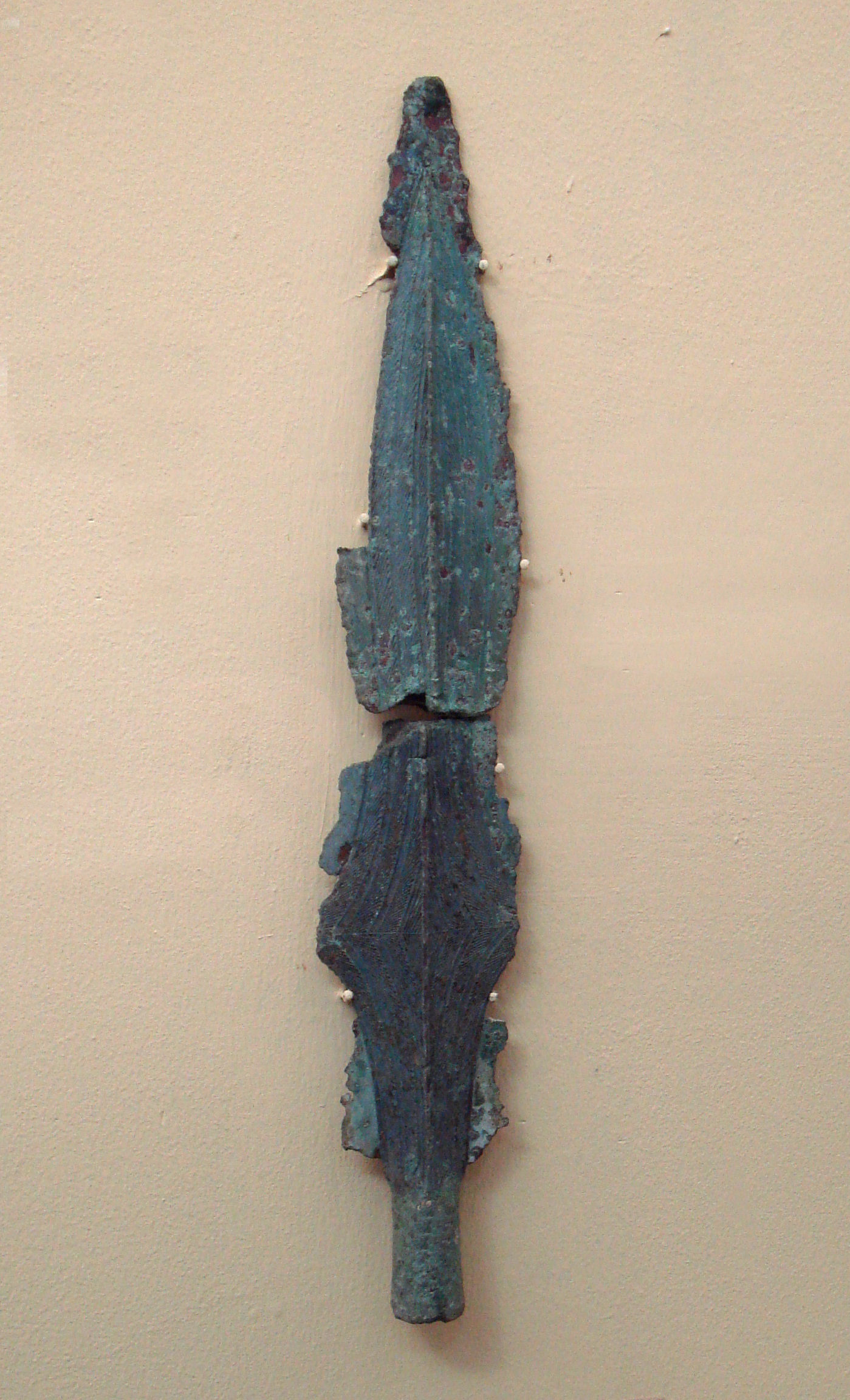
Decorated spear tip.

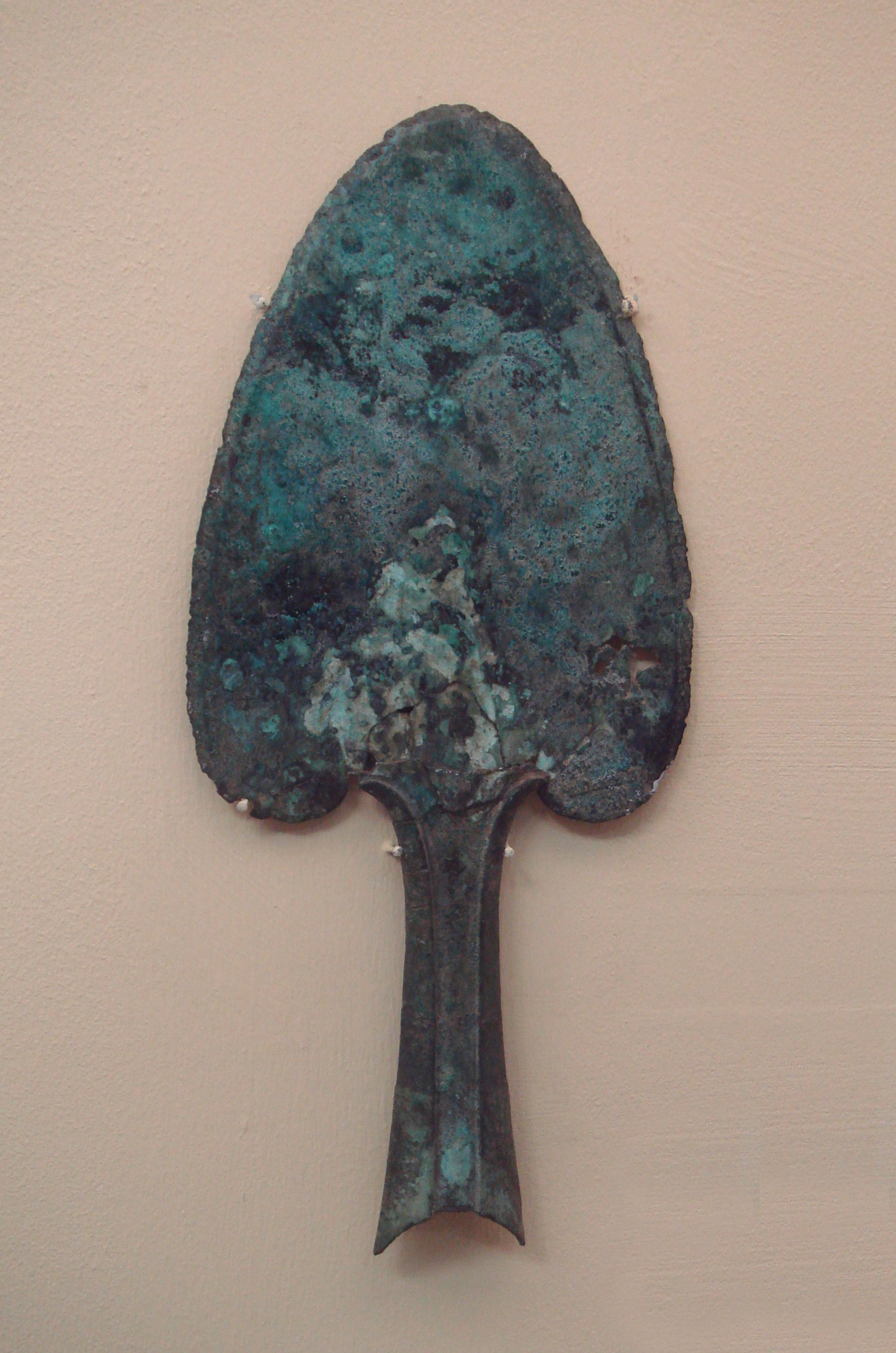
Heart-shaped spear tip.

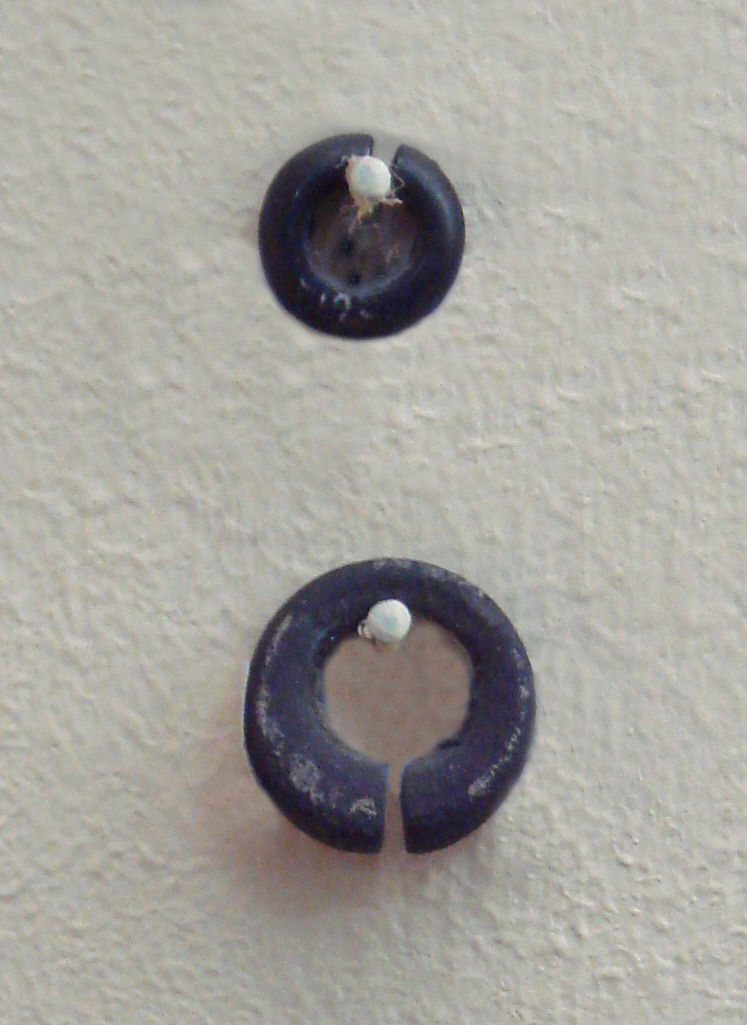
Bronze earrings.

== Ancient historical period: Indianized kingdoms (800–1343 CE) ==
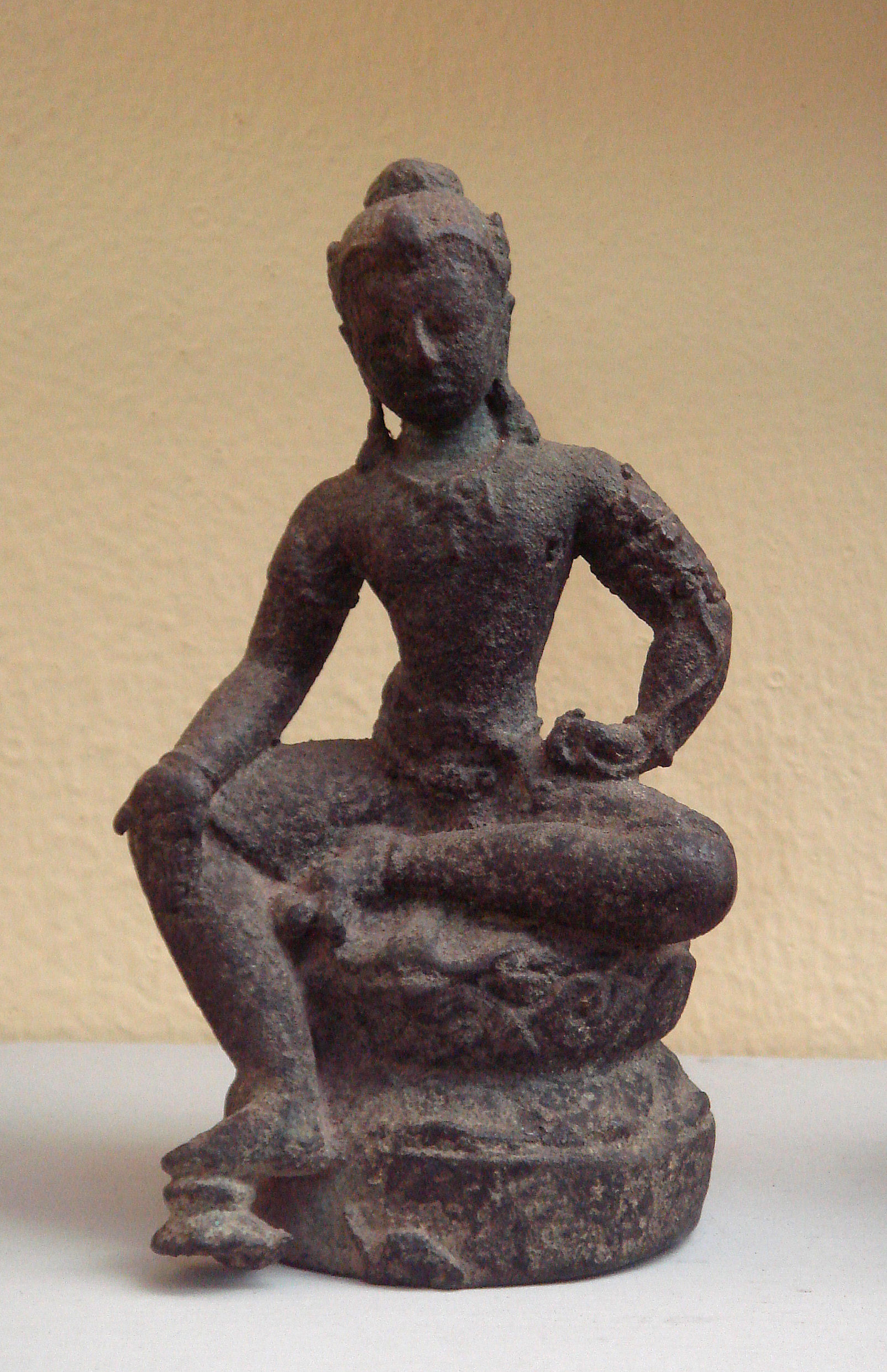
Buddha Manjucri from Goa Gajah cave, Bali.

The ancient historical period is defined by the appearance of the first written records in Bali, in the form of clay pallets with Buddhist inscriptions. These Buddhist inscriptions, found in small clay stupa figurines (called "stupikas") are the first known written inscriptions in Bali and date from around the 8th century CE. Such stupikas have been found in the regency of Gianyar, in the villages of Pejeng, Tatiapi and Blahbatuh.

This period is generally closely associated with the arrival and expansion of Buddhism and Hinduism in the island of Bali. The Belanjong pillar ("Prasasti Blanjong") in southern Sanur was inscribed in 914 with the mention of the reign of the Balinese king Sri Kesari Warmadewa. It is written in both the Indian Sanskrit language and Old Balinese language, using two scripts, the Nagari script and the Old Balinese script (which is used to write both Balinese and Sanskrit). It is dated 4 February 914 CE according to the Indian Shaka calendar.

The stone temple of Goa Gajah was made around the same period, and shows a combination of Buddhist and Hindu (Shivaite) iconography.

Inter-marriages between Java and Bali royalty also occurred, as when king Udayana Warmadewa of the Warmadewa dynasty of Bali married a Javanese princess, sister of the Emperor of Java Dharmawangsa. Their son, Airlangga, became the ruler of East Java, and consequently ruled on both Java and Bali. In the 12th century, descendants of Airlangga are also known to have ruled over Bali, such as Jayasakti (1146–50) and Jayapangus (1178–81).

The island of Java again started to encroach significantly on Bali with the invasion of the Singhasari king Kertanegara in 1284, as reported in the Nagarakertagama (canto 42, stanza 1).

Contacts with China were also important during this period. Chinese coins, called Kepeng were in use in Bali from the 7th century. The traditional Barong is also thought to be derived from the Chinese depiction of a lion. According to recent Balinese legends, the 12th-century king Jayapangus of Bali is said to have married a Chinese princess.

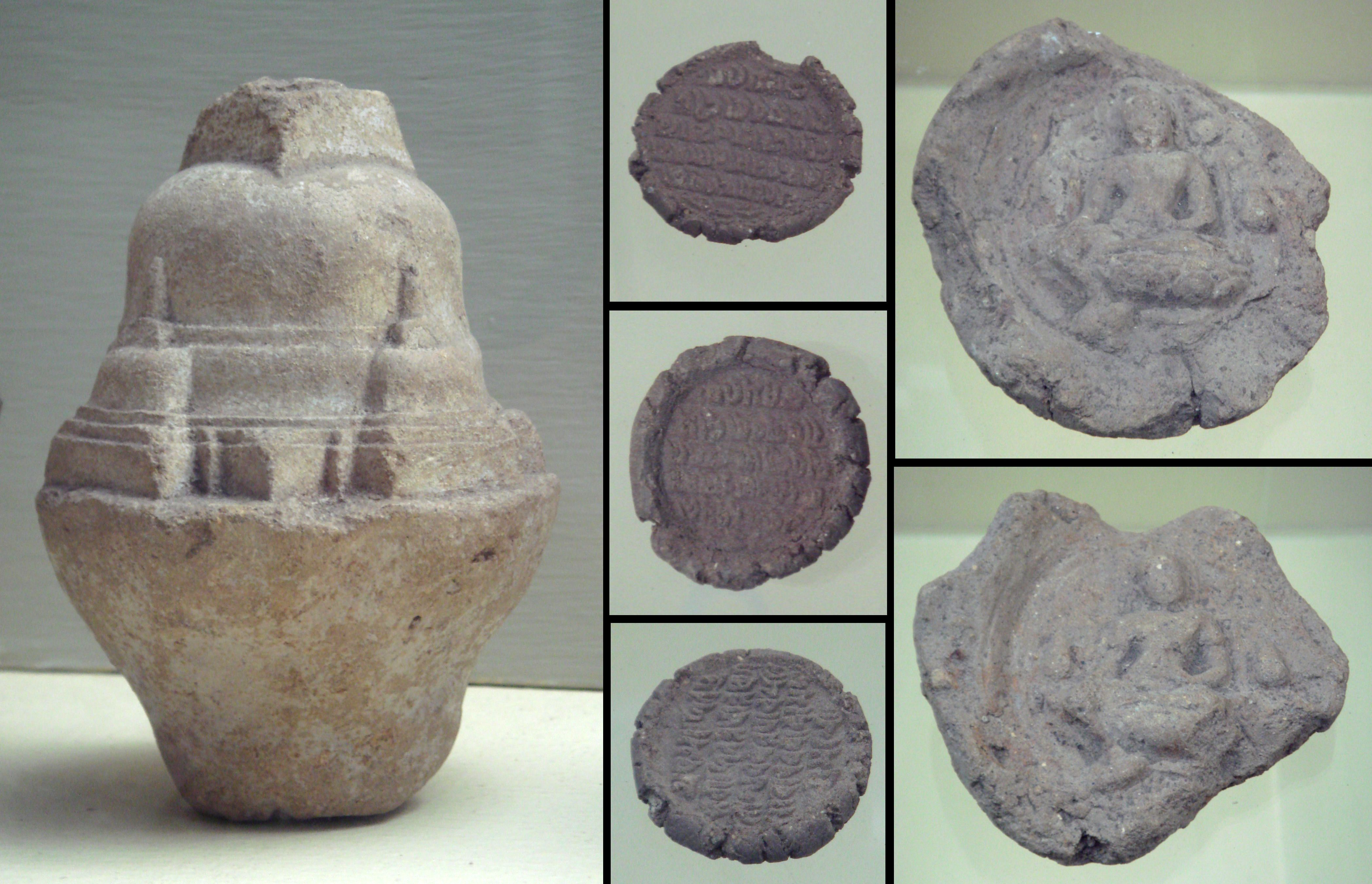
Buddhist model clay stupa ("Stupika") inside which can be found clay tablets with Buddhist texts and Buddhist images. 8th century Bali.

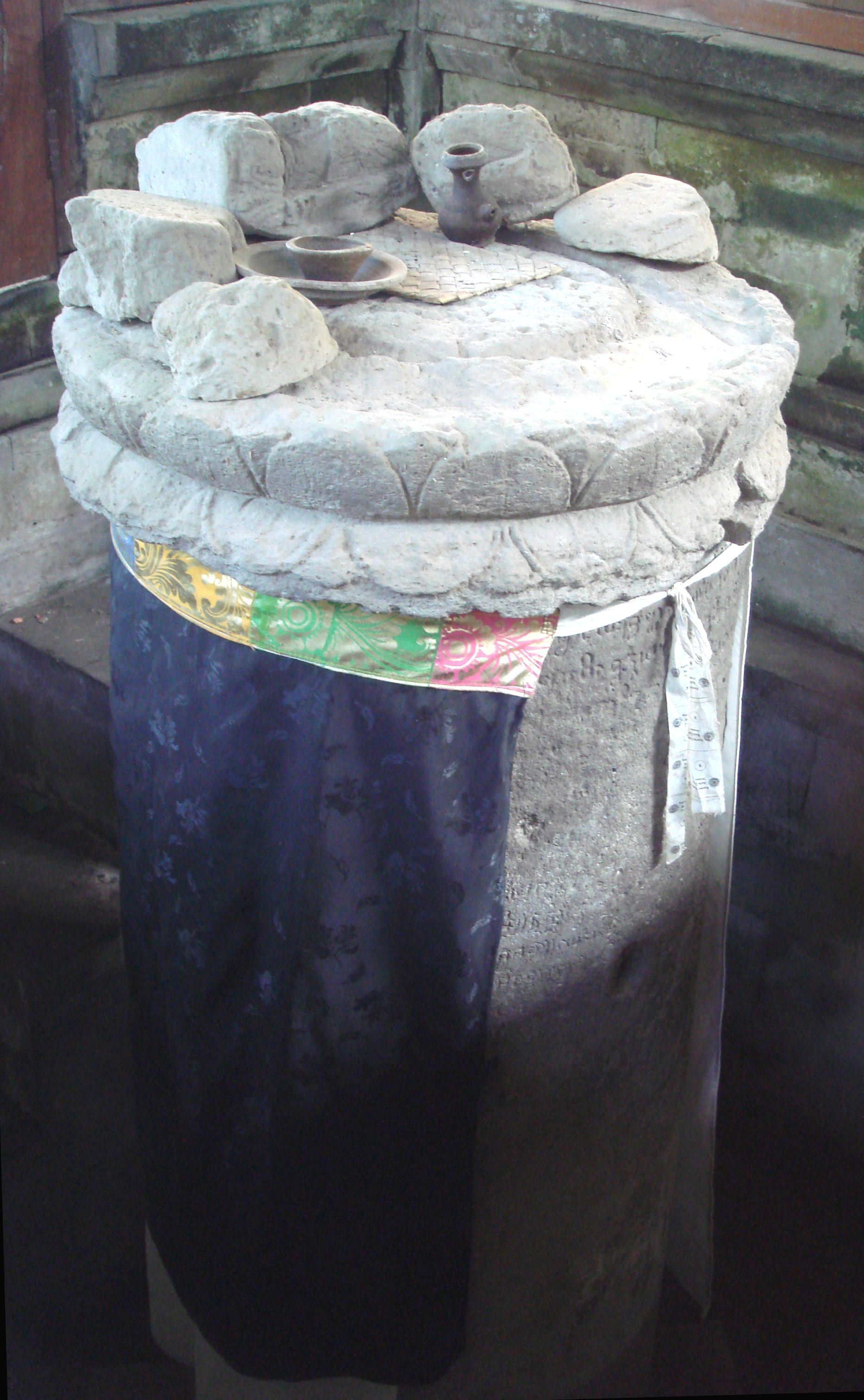
The Belanjong pillar in Sanur dates to 914 CE, and testifies to the contacts between Bali and the Indian subcontinent.

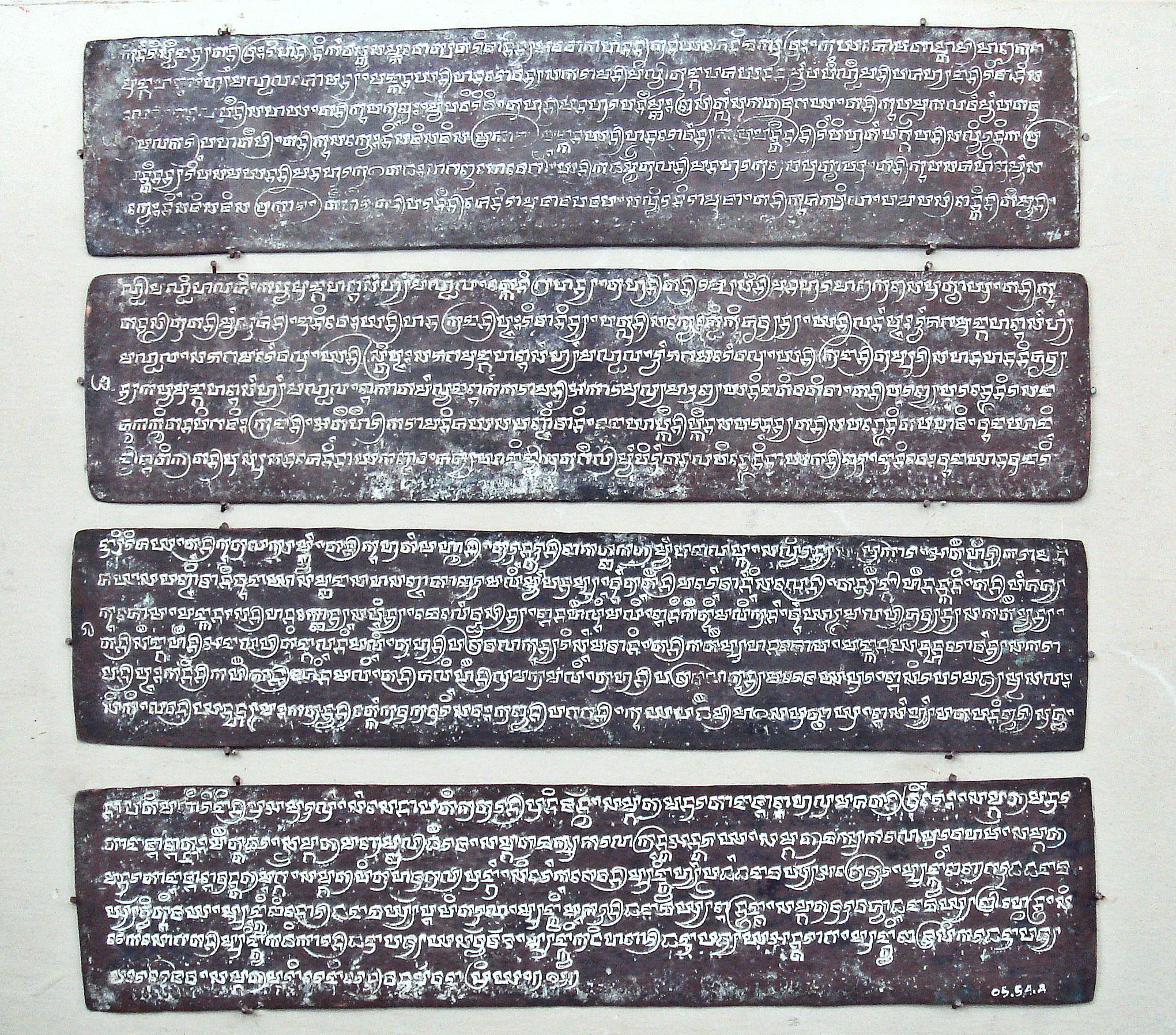
Copper plate inscriptions of king Jayapangus, Old Balinese script, 12th century.

== Middle historical period: Majapahit dynastic rule (1343–1846) ==
=== Majapahit Golden Age ===
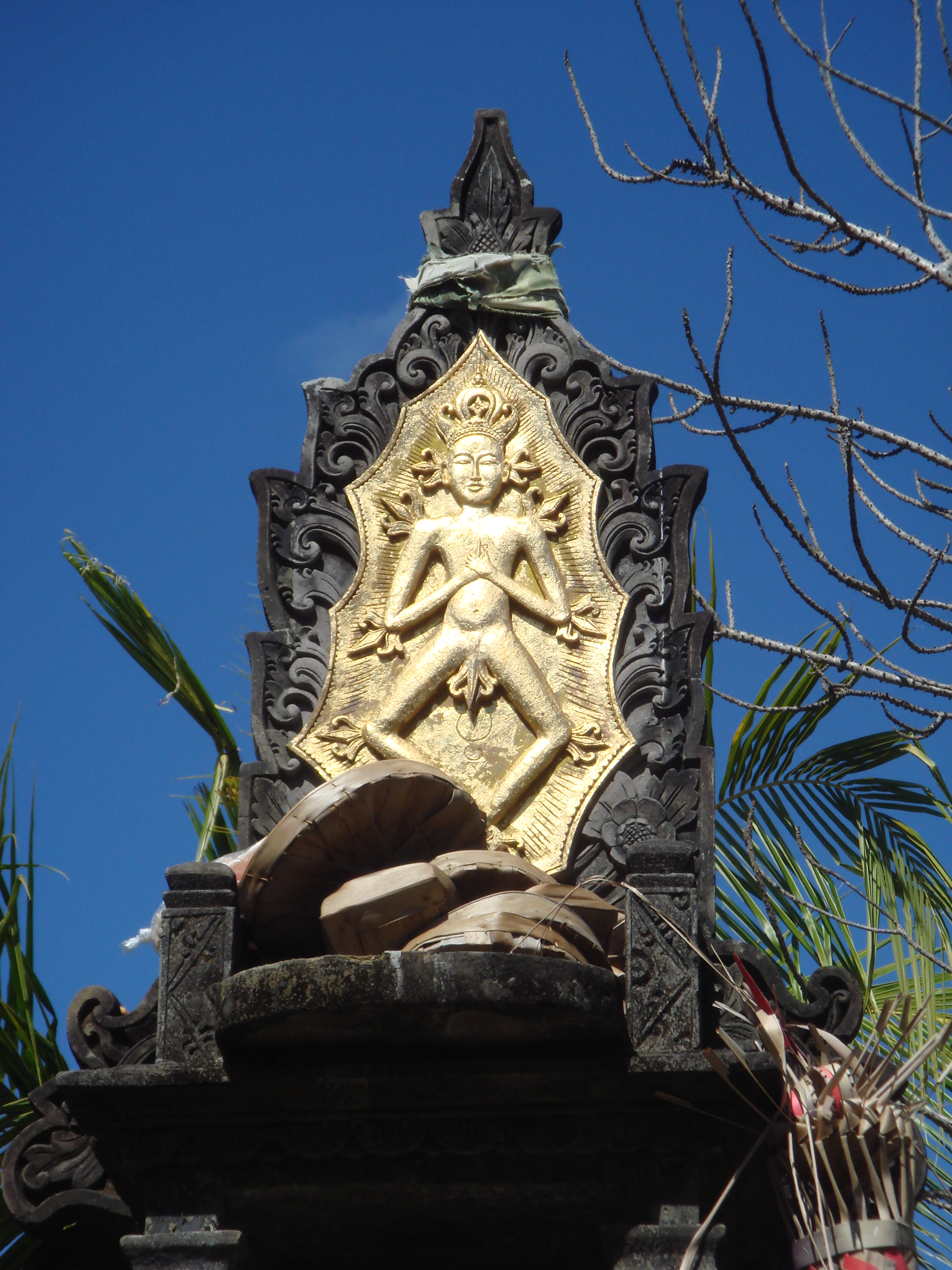
Depiction of Acintya as radiating sun god, on the back of an empty Padmasana throne, Jimbaran, Bali.

The Majapahit Empire rule over Bali became complete when Gajah Mada, Prime Minister of the Javanese king, defeated the Balinese king in Bedulu in 1343. The Majapahit capital in Bali was established at Samprangan and later Gelgel. Gelgel remained the paramount kingdom on Bali until the second half of the 17th century.

The rule of the Majapahit marks the strong influx of Javanese culture into Bali, most of all in architecture, dance and the theatre, in literature with the introduction of the Kawi script, in painting and sculpture and the wayang puppet theatre. The few Balinese who did not adopt this culture are still known today as "Bali Aga" ("Original Balinese") and still live in a few isolated villages.

With the rise of Islam in the Indonesian archipelago, the Majapahit empire finally fell, and Bali became independent at the end of the 15th or beginning of the 16th century. it is believed that the Javanese aristocracy fled to Bali, bringing an even stronger influx of Hindu arts, literature and religion. According to later chronicles, the dynasty of Majapahit origins, established after 1343, continued to rule Bali for 5 more centuries until 1908, when the Dutch eliminated it in the Dutch intervention in Bali (1908). In the 16th century, the Balinese king Dalem Baturenggong even expanded in turn his rule to East Java, Lombok and western Sumbawa.

Around 1540, together with the Islamic advance, a Hindu reformation movement took place, led by Dang Hyang Nirartha, leading to the introduction of the Padmasana shrine in honour of the "Supreme God" Acintya, and the establishment of the present shape of Shiva-worshipping in Bali. Nirartha also established numerous temples, including the spectacular temple at Uluwatu.

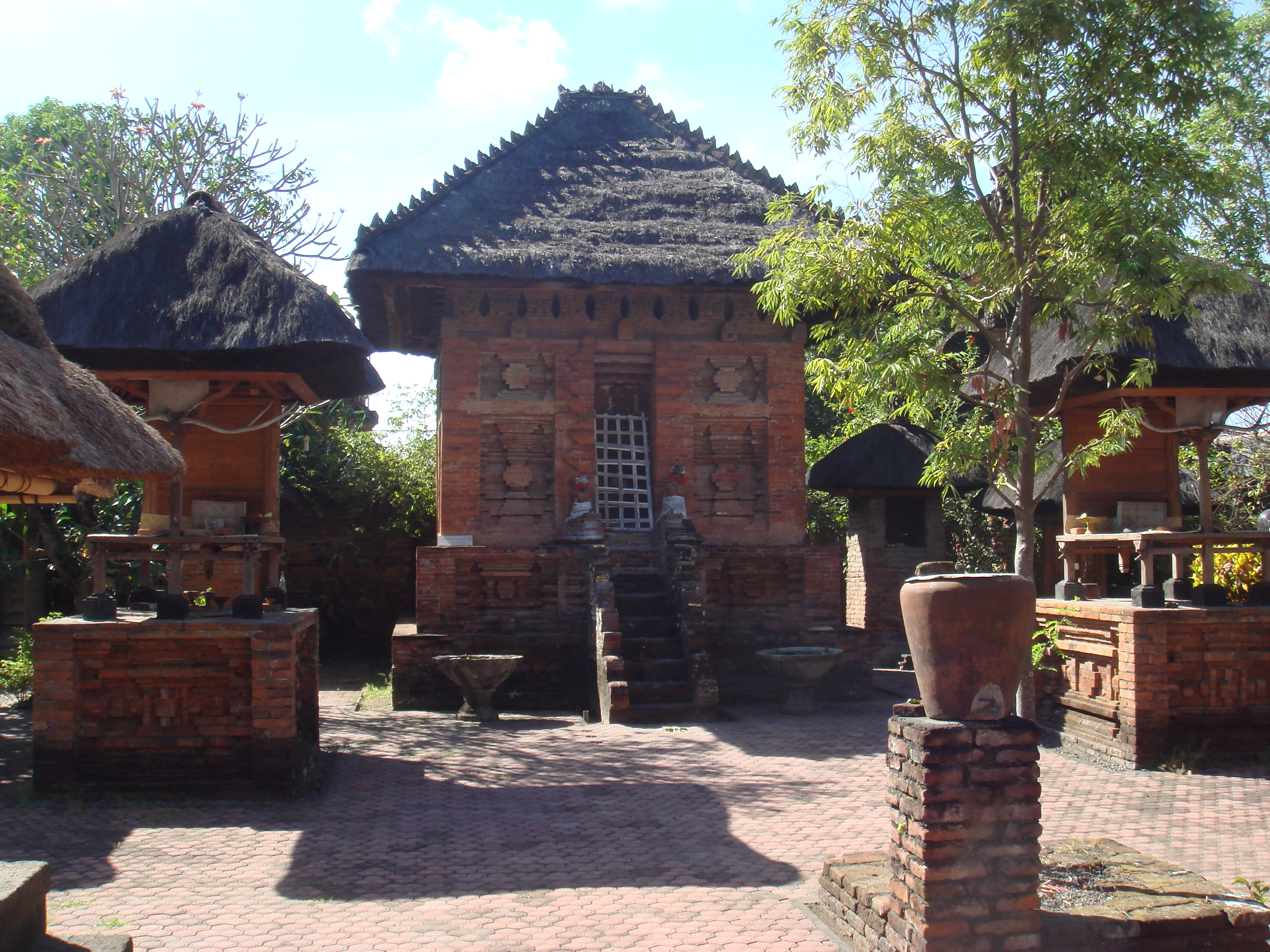
Pura Maospahit ("Majapahit Temple") was established during the period of the Majapahit Empire.

=== European contacts ===
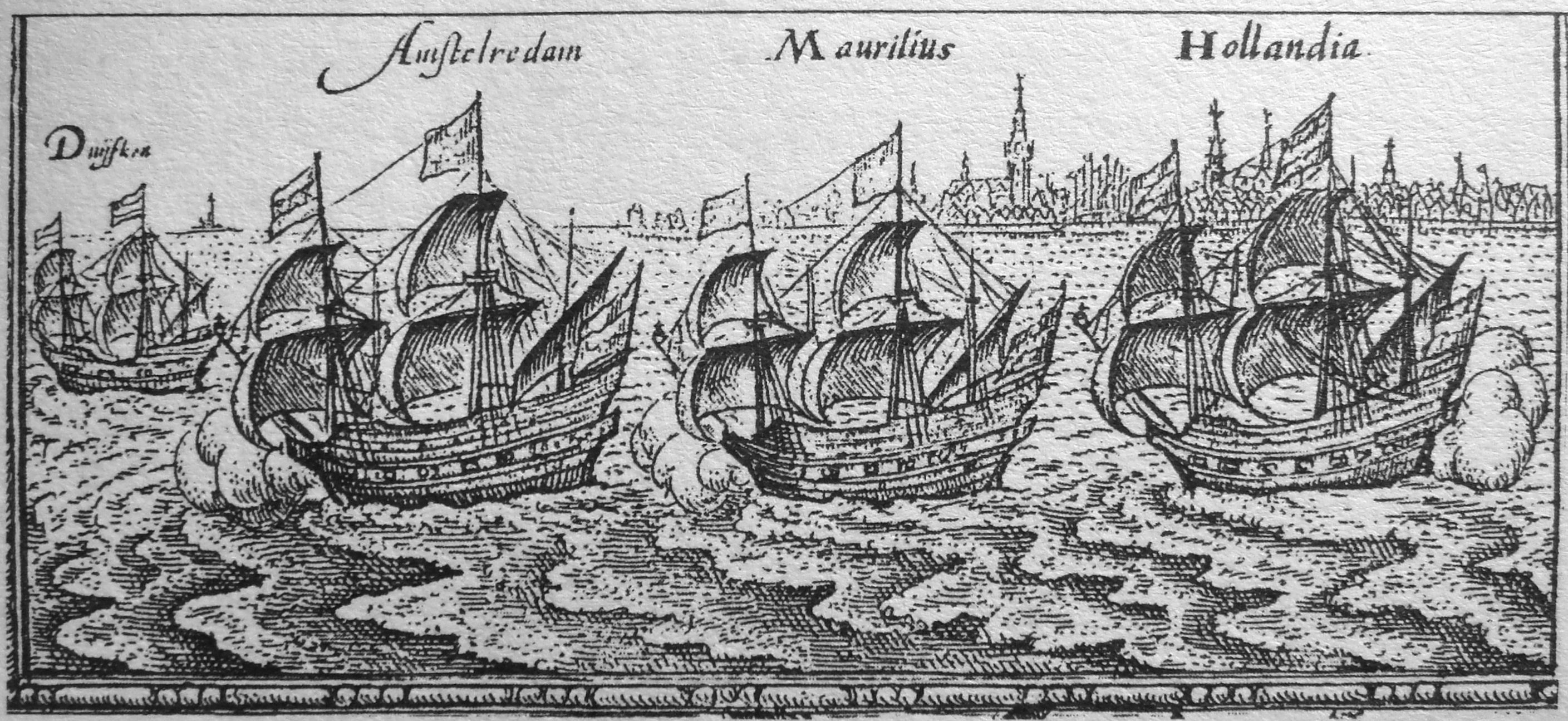
The "Bali fleet" of Cornelis de Houtman, leaving Amsterdam.

The first direct or indirect news of Bali by some European travellers can be traced back to Marco Polo and other possible travellers and traders via the Mediterranean Sea and Asia.

The first known European contact with Bali is thought to have been made in 1512, when a Portuguese expedition led by António de Abreu and Francisco Serrão reached its northern coast. It was the first expedition of a series of biannual fleets to the Moluccas, that throughout the 16th century usually travelled along the coasts of the Sunda Islands. Bali was also mapped in 1512, in the chart of Francisco Rodrigues, aboard the expedition. The Magellan expedition (1519–1522), through Elcano, is thought to have possibly sighted the island, and early Portuguese and Spanish charts mention the island under various names such as Boly, Bale and Bally. Sir Francis Drake briefly visited the island in 1580.

In 1585, the Portuguese government in Malacca sent a ship to establish a fort and a trading post in Bali, but the ship foundered on the reef of the Bukit peninsula and only five survivors could make it ashore. They went into the service of the king of Gelgel, known as the Dalem, and were provided with wives and homes.

In 1597, the Dutch explorer Cornelis de Houtman arrived in Bali with 89 surviving men (out of 249 who had departed). After visits to Kuta and Jembrana, he assembled his fleet in Padang Bai. Enthusiastic, he christened the island "Young Holland" (Jonck Hollandt). They were able to meet with the Dalem, who produced for them one of the Portuguese who had been in his service since 1585, Pedro de Noronha.

A second Dutch expedition appeared in 1601, that of Jacob van Heemskerck. On this occasion, the Dalem of Gelgel sent a letter to Prince Maurits, a translation of which was sent by Cornelis van Eemskerck. This letter was subsequently used by the Dutch in their claims to the island:

"God Be Praised
The King of Bali sends the King of Holland his greetings. Your Admiral Cornelis van Eemskerck has come to me, bringing me a letter from Your highness and requesting than I should permit Hollanders to trade here as freely as the Balinese themselves, wherefore I grant permission for all who You send to trade as freely as my own people may when they visit Holland and for Bali and Holland to be one.
This is copy of the King's letter, which was given to me in the Balinese language and which Emanuel Rodenbuch has translated into Dutch. There was no signature. It will also be sent from me to you.

— 7 July 1601, Cornelis van Eemskerck.

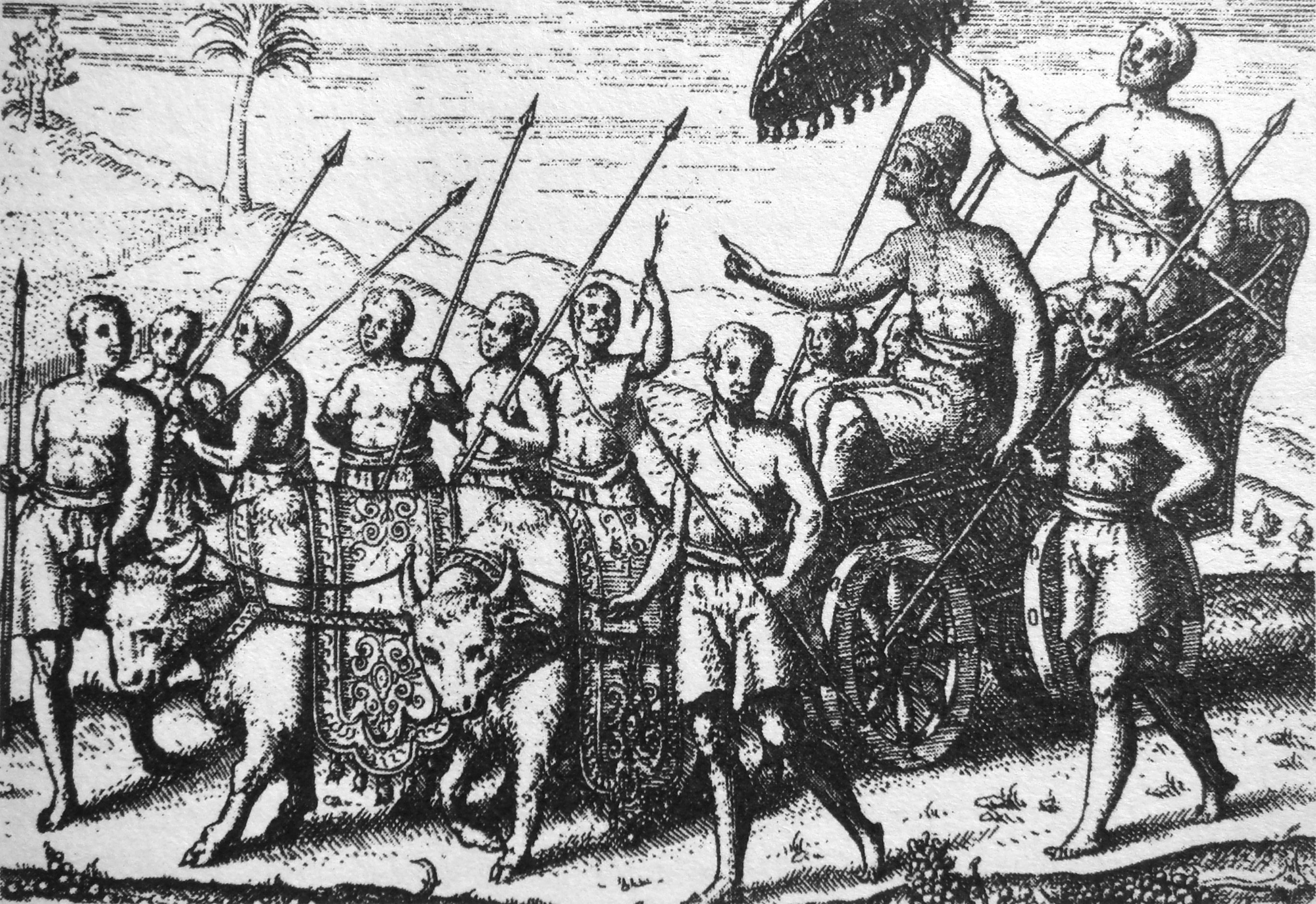
Description of the Balinese king, the Dalem, pulled by two white buffaloes, in Houtman's 1597 Verhael vande Reyse ... Naer Oost Indien.

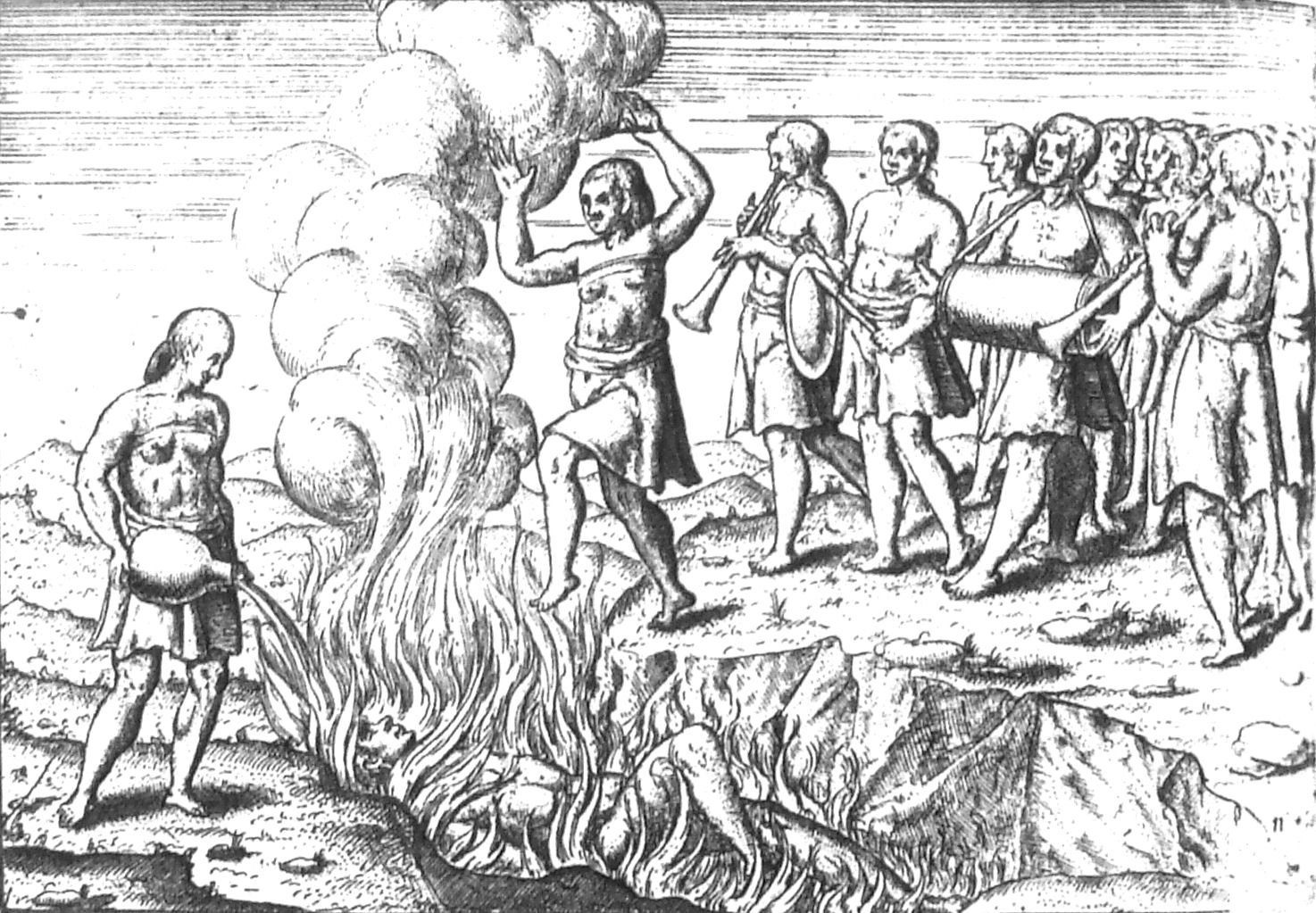
Description of the Balinese rite of self-sacrifice, in Houtman's 1597 Verhael vande Reyse ... Naer Oost Indien.

==== Slave and opium trade ====
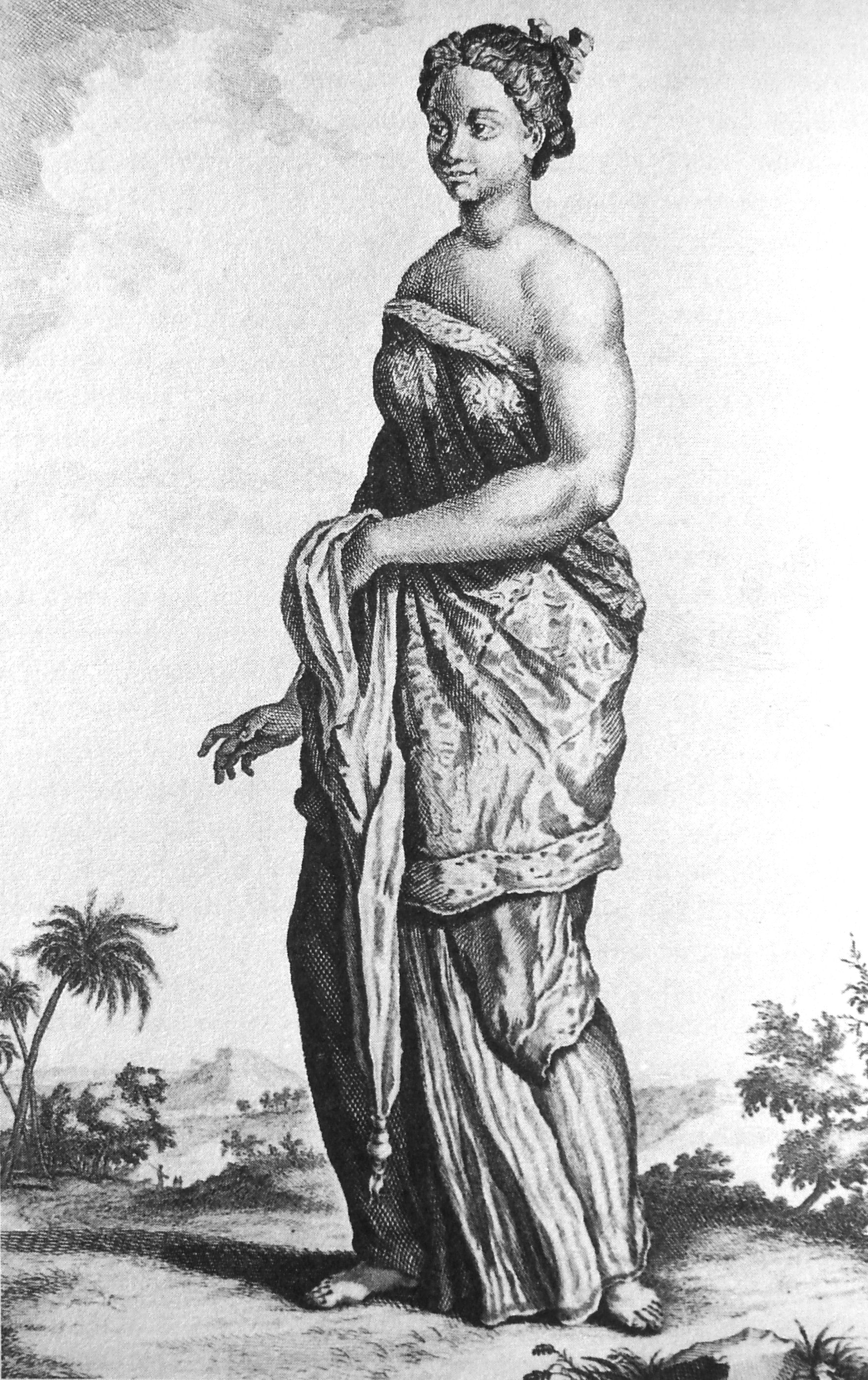
Balinese slave in Batavia circa 1700, from Cornelis de Bruijn's Voyages de Corneille le Brun..., 1718.

Dutch records of contacts with Bali in the 17th and 18th century are extremely scarce. Although the VOC was very active in the Maluku Islands, Java and Sumatra, it took little interest in Bali. The opening of a trading post was attempted in 1620, with the mission given to the First Merchant Hans van Meldert to purchase "rice, beasts, provisions, and women". The enterprise was abandoned in the face of hostile relations with the kings of Bali, and Meldert returned with only 14 female slaves.

Besides these attempts, the VOC left the Bali trade to private traders, mainly Chinese, Arab, Bugis and occasionally Dutch, who mainly dealt with opium and slave trade. According to Hanna, "Balinese slaves were highly prized both in Bali and overseas. Balinese male slaves were famous for their manual skills and their courage, the females for their beauty and artistic attainments". The kings of Bali would typically sell as slaves opponents, debtors, criminals or even orphans or widows. Such slaves would be used in Batavian households, the Dutch Colonial Army, or sent abroad, the biggest market being French Mauritius. Payment to the Balinese kings would usually be made in opium. The main port for this trade was the harbour of Buleleng in north Bali. The English also started to make various attempts to participate in the Balinese trade, to the great worry of the Dutch.

==== Local conflicts ====
Attempts were made for alliances between the Dutch and the Balinese in their conflicts with the Mataram Sultanate of Java. In 1633, the Dutch, who were themselves at war with Mataram sent an ambassador, Van Oosterwijck, to obtain the collaboration of the King of Bali in Gelgel, who was apparently preparing a similar offensive against Mataram. The attempt failed however. When Mataram invaded Bali in 1639, Dewa Agung requested Dutch help in vain, and finally succeeded in repelling Mataram alone. After 1651 the Gelgel kingdom began to break up due to internal conflicts. In 1686 a new royal seat was established in Klungkung, four kilometres north of Gelgel. The rulers of Klungkung, known by the title Dewa Agung, were however unable to maintain power over Bali. The island was in fact split in nine minor kingdoms (Klungkung, Buleleng, Karangasem, Mengwi, Badung, Tabanan, Gianyar, Bangli, Jembrana). The various kingdoms fought a succession of wars among themselves, although they accorded the Dewa Agung a symbolic paramount status. This situation lasted until the coming of the Dutch in the 19th century.

==== Franco-Dutch alliance with Bali (1808) ====
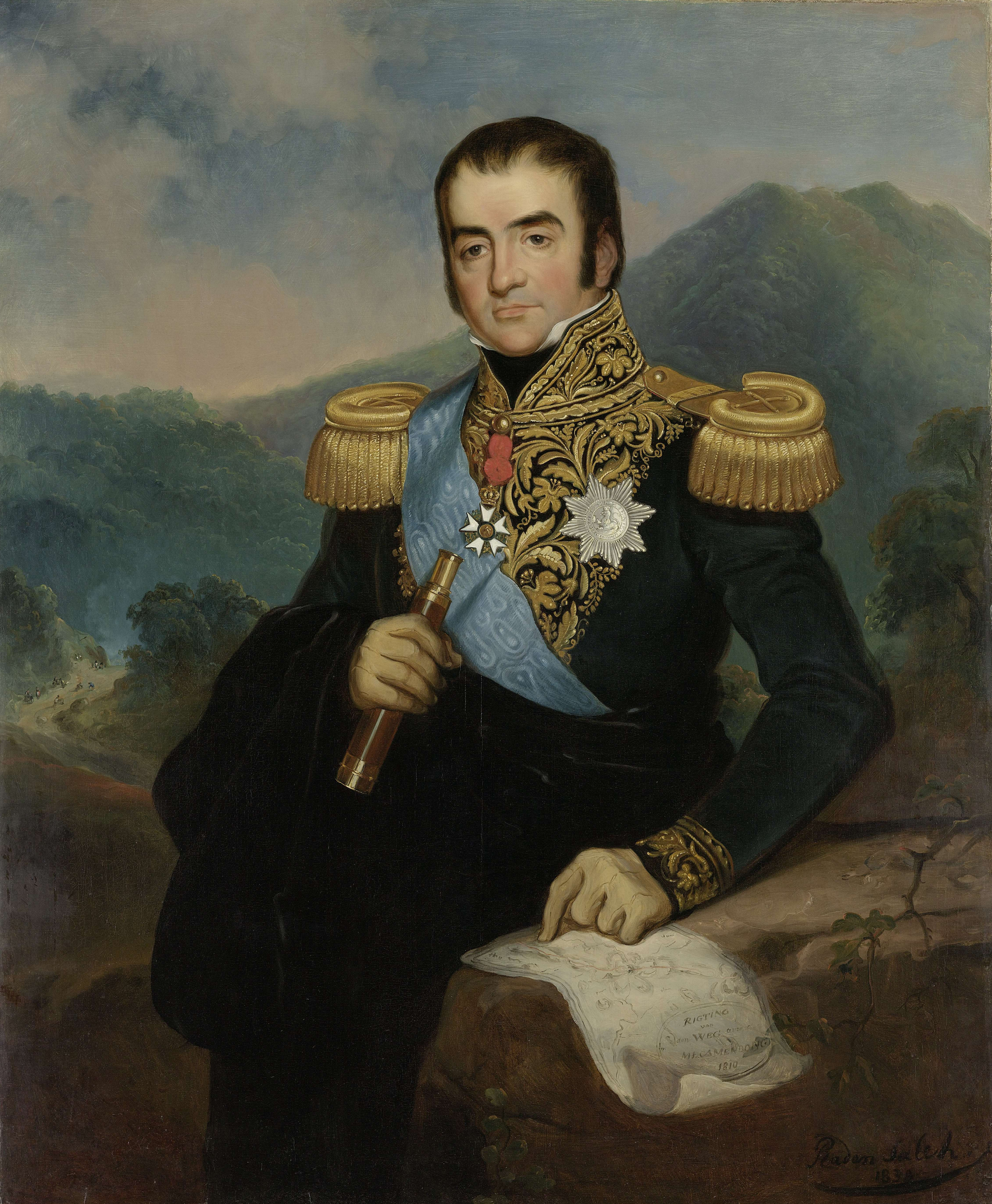
Herman Willem Daendels signed a Franco-Dutch alliance with the Balinese king of Badung in 1808.

For a brief period, in 1806–1815, the Netherlands became a province of France, and Bali was thus in contact with a Franco-Dutch administration. Napoleon handpicked a new Governor-General, the "Iron Marshall" Willem Daendels, sent ships and troops to reinforce the East Indies against British attacks, and had military fortifications built through the length of Java. A treaty of alliance was signed in 1808 between the new administration and the Balinese king of Badung, to provide workers and soldiers for the Franco-Dutch defensive effort, but Java fell to the British in 1811, and the agreement was not implemented.

==== Conflict with Great Britain (1814) ====
During the British occupation of the East Indies by Stamford Raffles (which lasted from 1811 until 1816, right after the fall of the Napoleonic Empire), the British made fruitless advances to the Balinese kings. Raffles' abolition of slavery on the contrary triggered the indignation of the Rajas of Buleleng and Karangasem, who sent a military expedition against Blambangan, where they fought British Sepoys in February 1814. In May, Raffles sent an expeditionary force to Bali under Major General Nightingale to obtain assurances of "submission". Raffles himself visited the island in 1815.

==== Return of the Netherlands (1816) ====
The British returned the East Indies to the Netherlands in 1816. After that, the Dutch endeavoured to reassert and reinforce their control over their colonial possessions. This would open the way to a much more assertive Dutch presence in the East Indies and Bali. Raffles, still looking for an island to colonise, finally settled on Singapore.

A first special commissioner named H.A. van der Broek was sent to sign "concept contracts" with the Balinese kings, which the kings did not accept, but became quasi-valid in the mind of the Dutch.

Meanwhile, a few European traders managed to act as intermediaries between Bali and Europe, such as the Danish merchant Mads Lange, nicknamed the "White king of Bali".

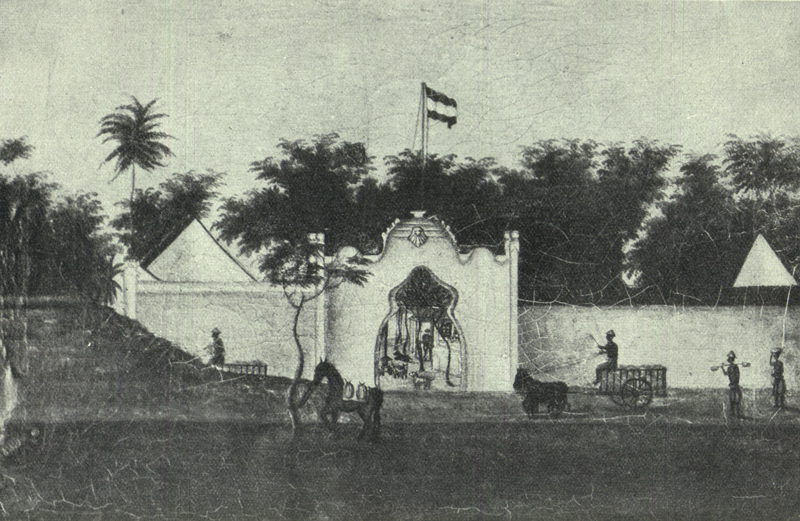
The factory of Mads Lange in Kuta around 1845.

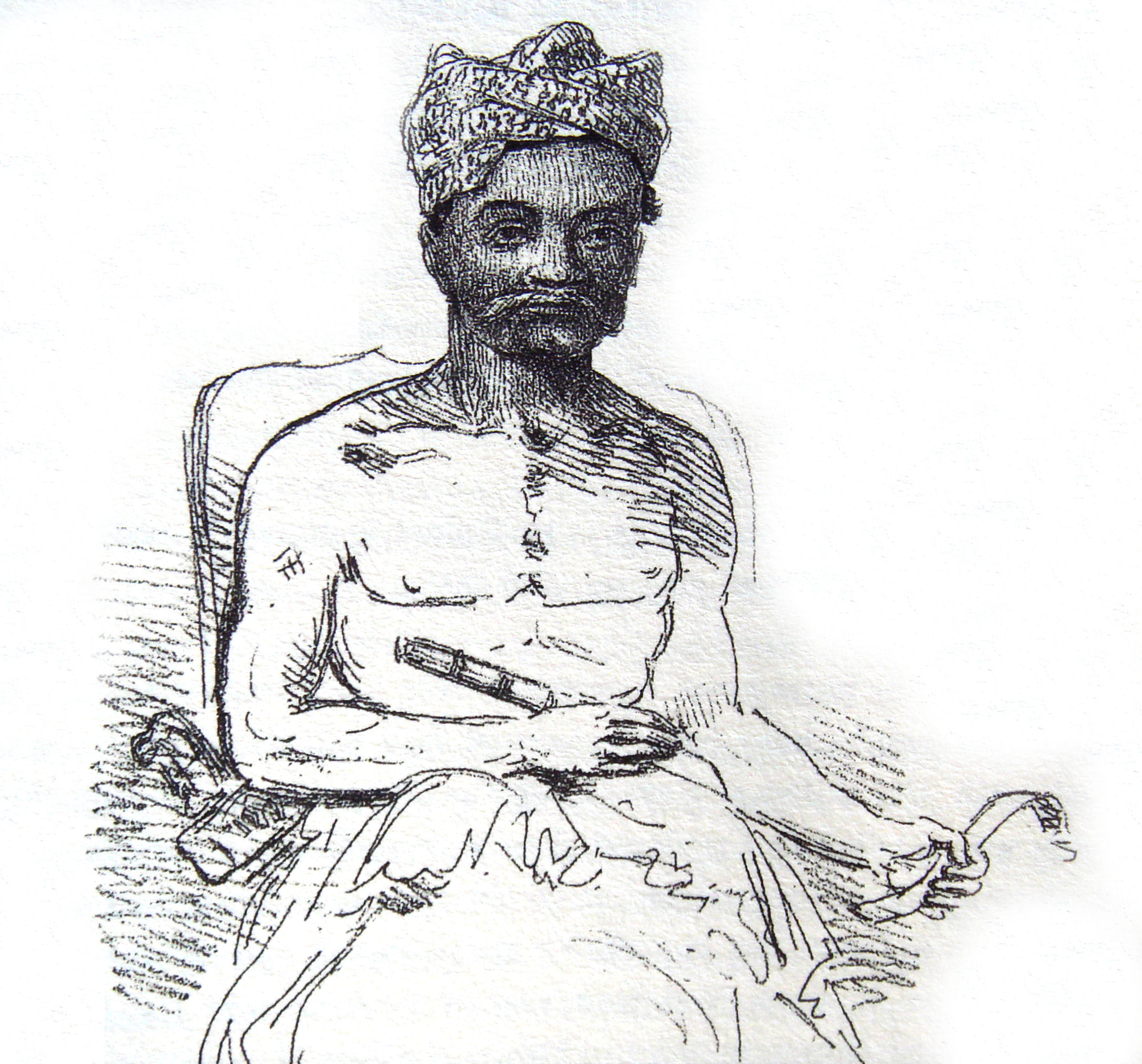
Balinese Raja, in Thomas Stamford Raffles's The History of Java, 1817

== Modern historical period (1846–present) ==
Dutch colonial control expanded across the Indonesian archipelago in the nineteenth century, to become the Dutch East Indies. In Bali, the Dutch used the pretext of eradicating opium smuggling, arms running, plunder of shipwrecks, and slavery to impose their control on Balinese kingdoms.

=== Northern Bali campaigns (1846–1849) ===
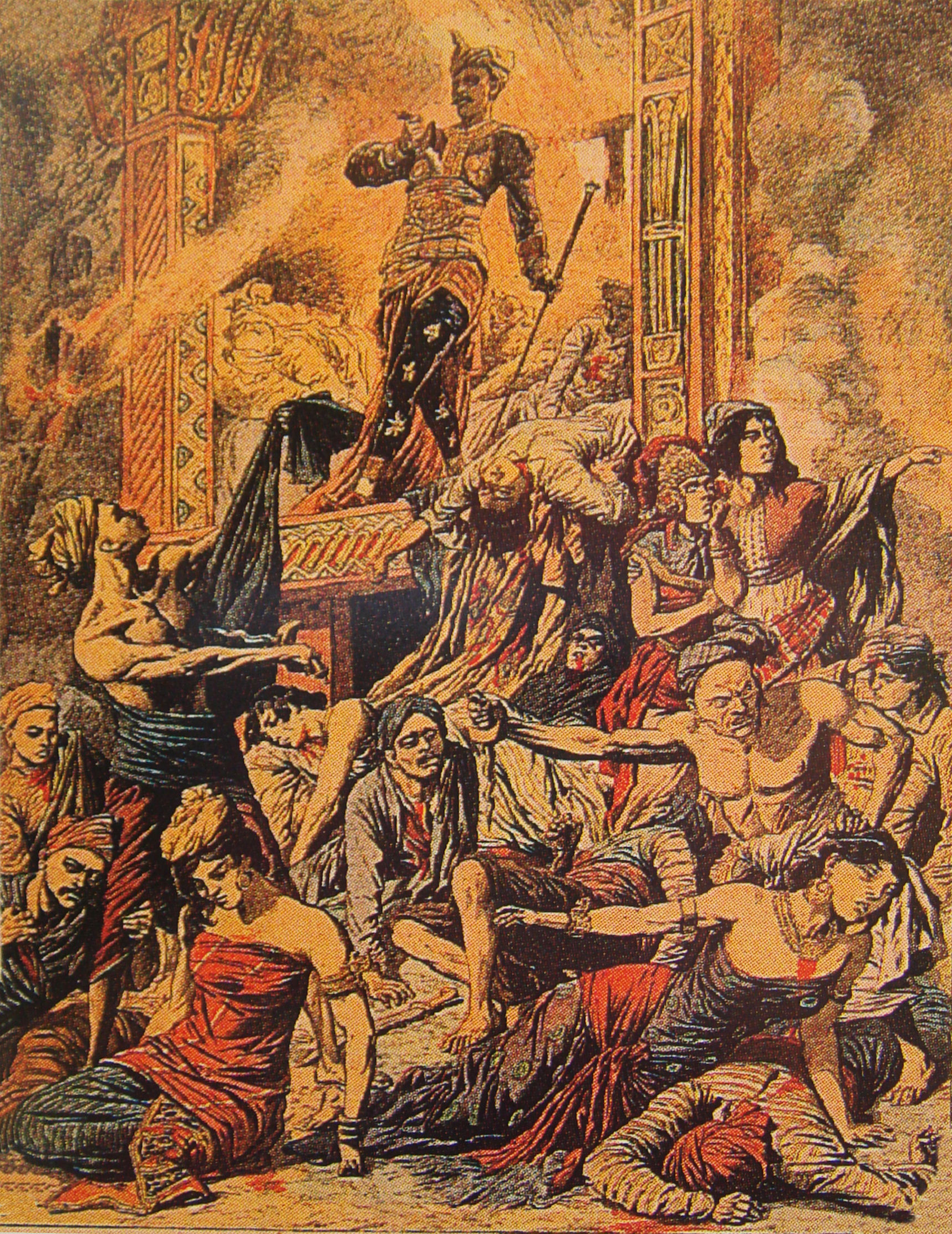
The Raja of Buleleng killing himself with 400 followers, in an 1849 puputan against the Dutch. Le Petit Journal, 1849.

A series of three military expeditions occurred between 1846 and 1849; the first two were initially countered successfully by Jelantik. The "kingdoms of Buleleng and Bangli waged continuous disputes, and in 1849 Bangli assisted the Dutch in their military expedition against Buleleng", permitted the Dutch to take control of the northern Bali kingdoms of Buleleng and Jembrana. The king of Buleleng and his retinue killed themselves in a mass ritual suicide, called a puputan, which was also a hallmark of the subsequent Dutch military interventions.

=== Colonial administration ===
Subsequently, the Dutch established a colonial administration in northern Bali. They nominated a member of the royal family as regent, and attached to him a Dutch Controller.

The first resident Controller was Heer van Bloemen Waanders, who arrived in Singaraja on 12 August 1855. His main reforms included the introduction of vaccination, the banning of self-sacrifice or suttee, the eradication of slavery, the improvement of the irrigation system, the development of coffee production as a cash crop, the construction of roads, bridges and port facilities for improved commerce and communication. The Dutch also drastically revamped and increased the tax revenues from the people and from commerce, especially of opium. By the mid-1870, Buleleng was visited by 125 European-style ships annually, and another 1,000 local ships. Christianization was attempted but proved a total failure.

Uprising occurred, resulting in further Dutch intervention. In 1858, the Balinese nobleman Njoman Gempol raised a rebellion by claiming that the Dutch were exploiting Java. A fourth military expedition was sent in 1858 with 12 officers and 707 infantrymen and eliminated the rebellion, sentencing Njoman Gempol to exile in Java.

Another rebellion was led by Ida Mahe Rai against which was sent a fifth military expedition in 1868, consisting of 800 men under Major van Heemskerk. Initially unsuccessful, the expedition was reinforced by 700 men and a new commander, Colonel de Brabant, and prevailed with only two officers and 10 soldiers killed.

=== Lombok and Karangasem campaign (1894) ===
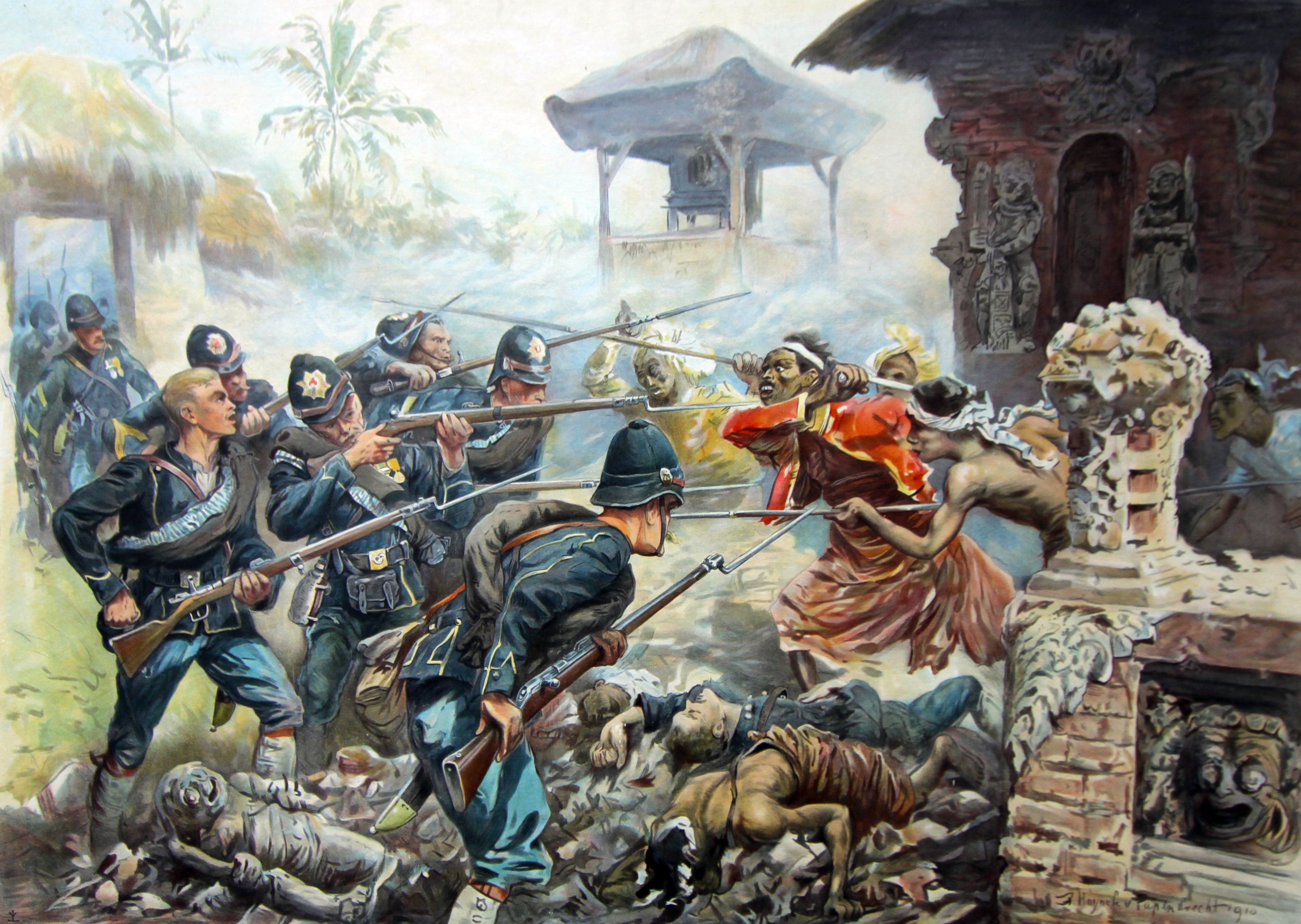
Dutch intervention in Lombok and Karangasem against the Balinese in 1894.

In the late 1890s, struggles between Balinese kingdoms in the island's south were exploited by the Dutch to increase their control. A war of the Rajas between 1884 and 1894 gave another pretext to the Dutch to intervene. In 1894, the Dutch defeated the Balinese ruler of Lombok, adding both Lombok and Karangasem to their possessions.

=== Southern Bali campaigns (1906–1908) ===
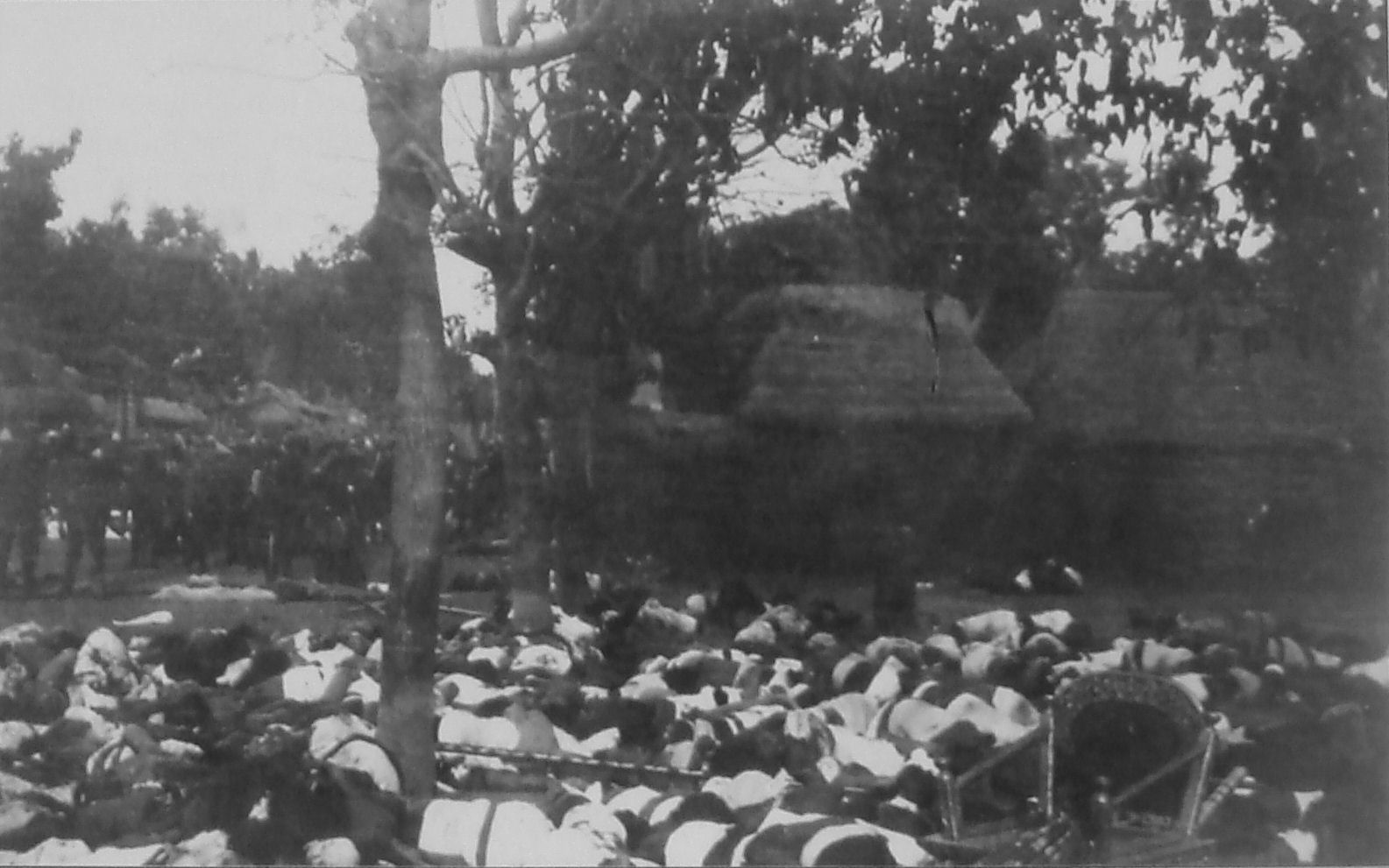
Balinese corpses at Denpasar in the Dutch intervention in Bali (1906).

A few years later, with the pretext of stopping the plundering of shipwrecks, the Dutch mounted large naval and ground assaults at the Sanur region in 1906 in the Dutch intervention in Bali (1906), leading to the elimination of the royal house of Badung and about 1000 deaths. In the Dutch intervention in Bali (1908), a similar massacre occurred in the face of a Dutch assault in Klungkung, sealing the end of the Majapahit dynasty which had ruled the island, and the total rule of the Dutch over Bali. Afterwards the Dutch governors were able to exercise administrative control over the island, but local control over religion and culture was generally left intact.

The Dutch military interventions however were followed closely by the western press which supplied a steady stream of reports of the violent, bloody conquest of the southern part of the island. The disproportion between the offence and harshness of the punitive actions was pointed out. The image of the Netherlands as a benevolent and responsible colonial power were seriously affected as a consequence. The Netherlands, also under criticism for their policies in Java, Sumatra and the eastern island, decided to make amends, and announced the establishment of an "Ethical policy". As a consequence, the Dutch in Bali turned students and protectors of Balinese culture and endeavoured to preserve it in addition to their initial modernisation role. Efforts were made at preserving Bali culture and at making it a "living museum" of classical culture, and in 1914, Bali was opened to tourism.

In the 1930s, anthropologists Margaret Mead and Gregory Bateson, and artists Miguel Covarrubias and Walter Spies, and musicologist Colin McPhee created a western image of Bali as "an enchanted land of aesthetes at peace with themselves and nature", and western tourism first developed on the island.

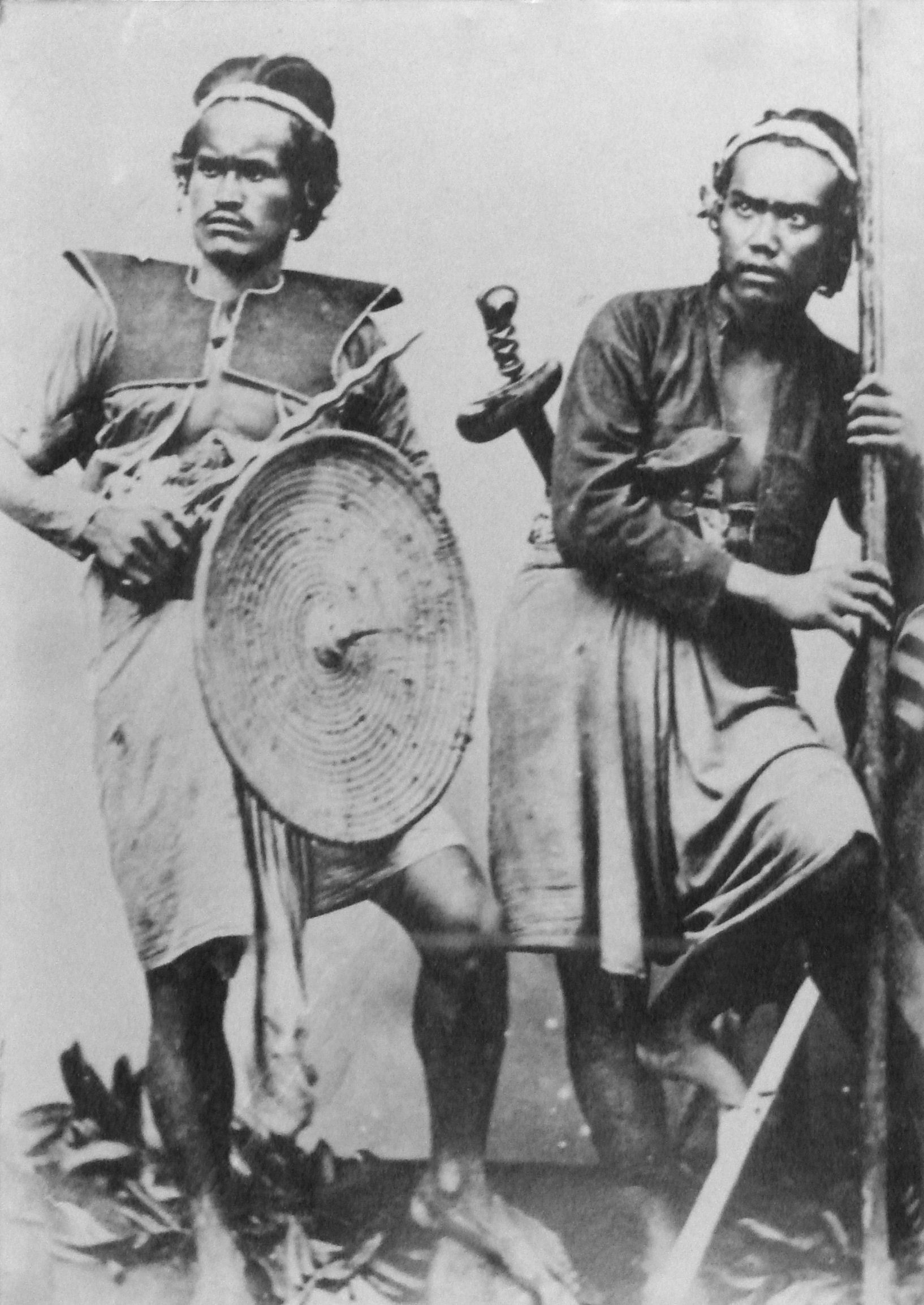
Balinese soldiers, 1880s.

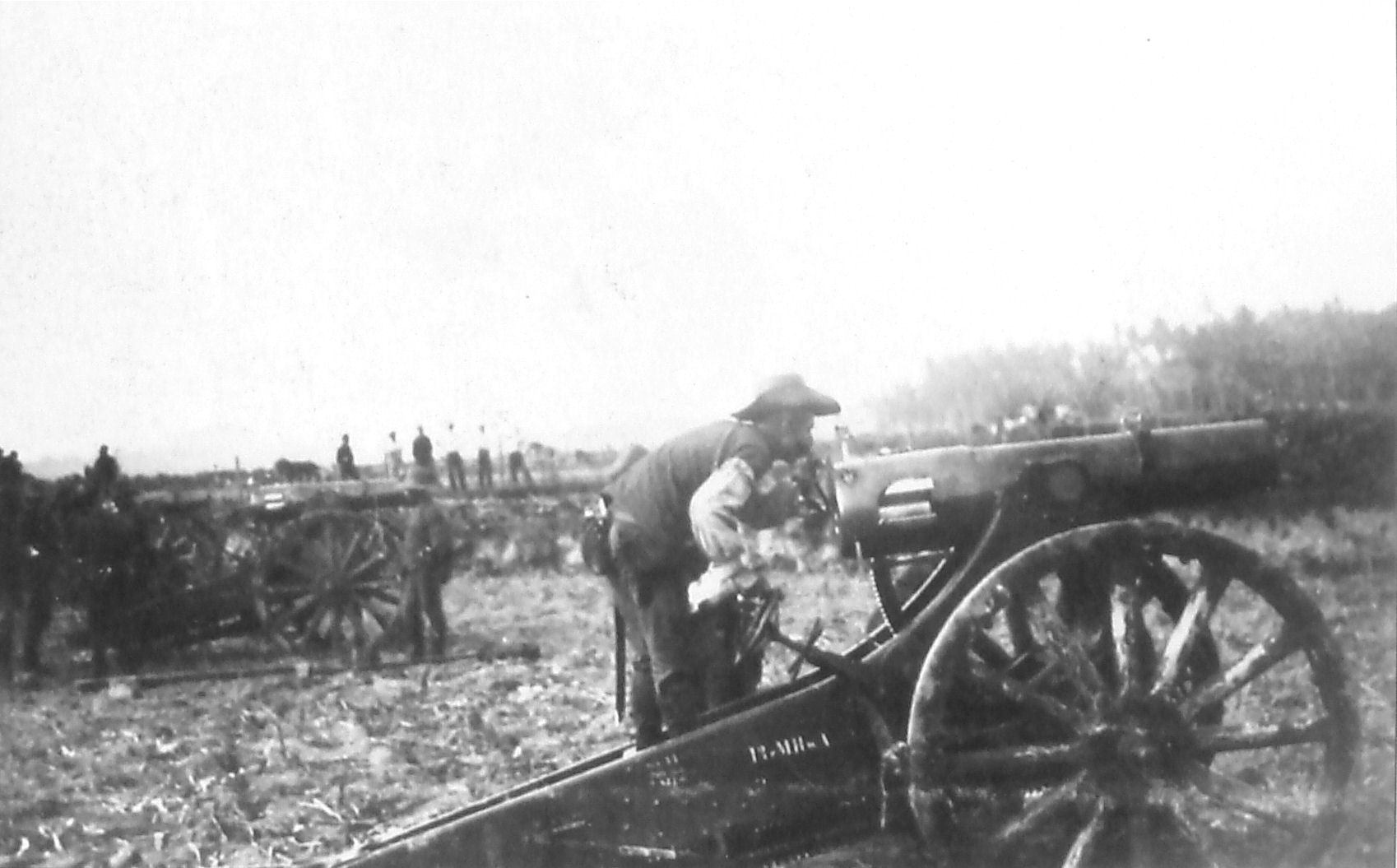
Dutch artillery in the fight against the Balinese, 1906.

=== Second World War and Indonesian independence ===
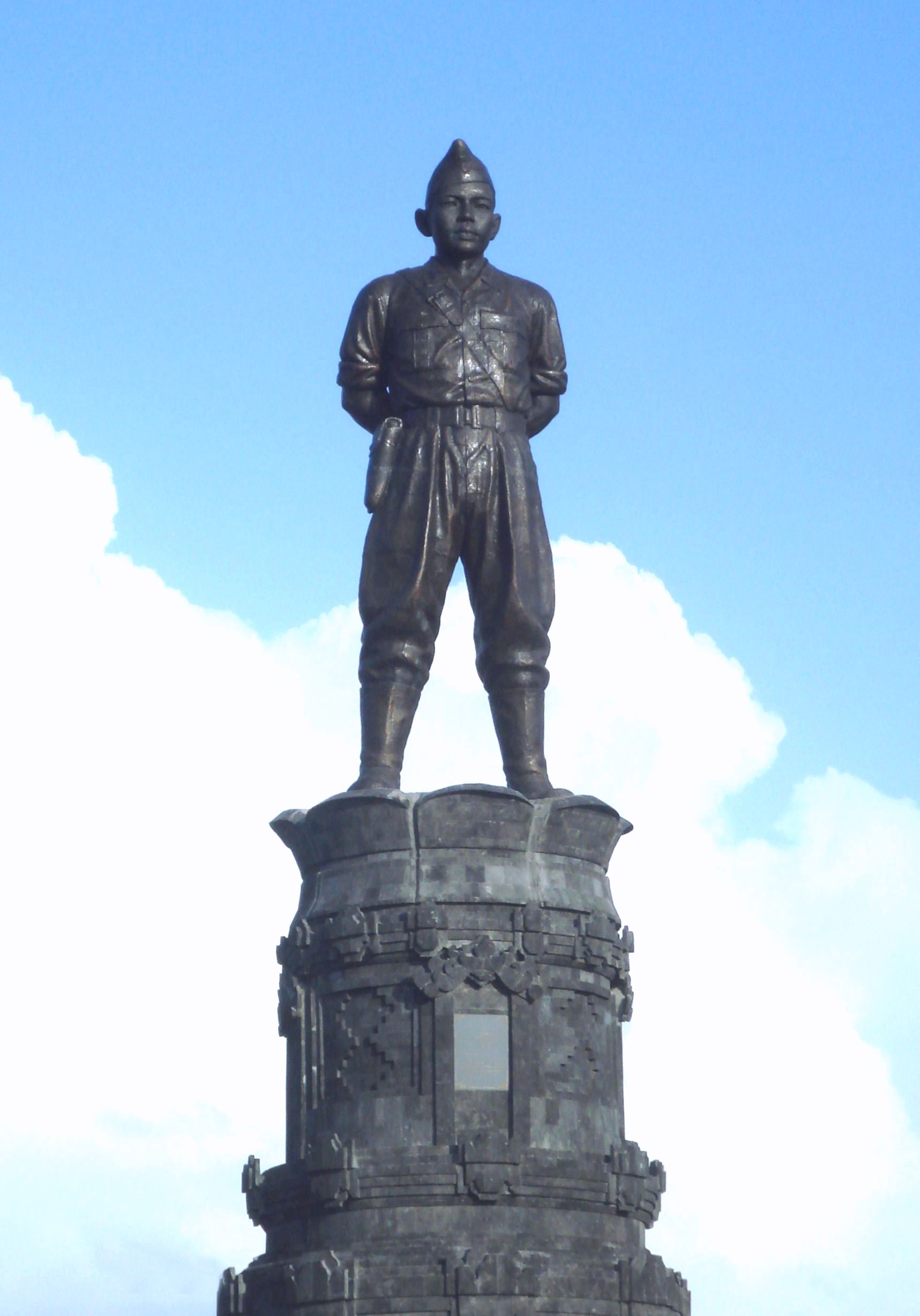
Statue of I Gusti Ngurah Rai, who fought against the Dutch for independence.

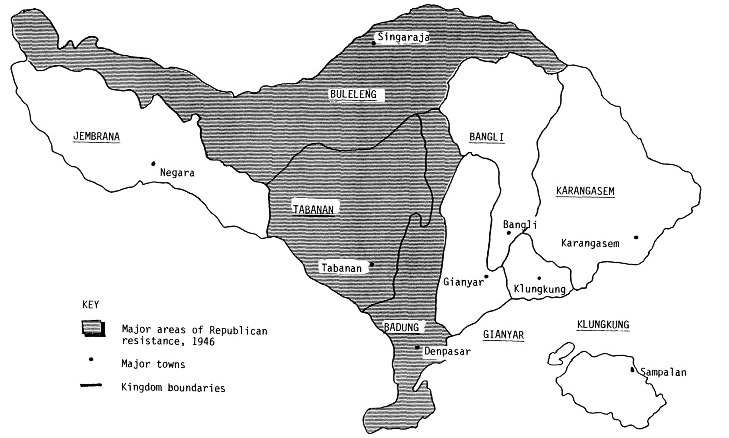
Maps of Balinese kingdoms during the National Revolution

Imperial Japan occupied Bali during World War II with the declared objective of forming a "Greater East Asian Co-Prosperity Sphere" that would liberate Asian countries from Western domination. Future rulers such as Sukarno were brought forward by the Japanese. Sukarno famously said: "The Lord be praised, God showed me the way; in that valley of the Ngarai I said: Yes, Independent Indonesia can only be achieved with Dai Nippon...For the first time in all my life, I saw myself in the mirror of Asia". The harshness of war requisitions made Japanese rule more resented than Dutch rule. Most of all, independence was strongly desired among the populace.

Following Japan's Pacific surrender in August 1945, the Balinese took over the Japanese weapons. The following month Bali was liberated by the British and Indian 5th infantry Division under the command of Major-General Robert Mansergh who took the Japanese surrender. Once the Japanese forces had been repatriated the island was handed over to the Dutch the following year.

The Dutch with their return to Indonesia reinstated their pre-war colonial administration. One Balinese, Colonel Gusti Ngurah Rai, formed a Balinese 'freedom army'. Colonel I Gusti Ngurah Rai, by then 29 years old, rallied his forces in east Bali at Marga Rana, where they were trapped by heavily armed Dutch troops. On 20 November 1946, in the Battle of Margarana, the Balinese battalion was entirely wiped out, breaking the last of Balinese military resistance. The successor of I Gusti Ngurah Rai however, was Widja Kusuma. He continued to fight the Dutch in 1947 and 1948, after which he surrendered with his troops from the mountains.

In 1946 the Dutch constituted Bali as one of the 13 administrative districts of the newly proclaimed State of East Indonesia, a rival state to the Republic of Indonesia which was proclaimed and headed by Sukarno and Hatta. The Balinese resistance on the island was so extensive, that the Dutch set up a network of 50 prison camps, in which violence against prisoners was common place. Finally, Bali was included in the United States of Indonesia when the Netherlands recognised Indonesian independence on 29 December 1949. The Dutch gained more than 103 Billion euro in financial benefits with the transfer of sovereignty to Indonesia. The first governor of Bali, Anak Agung Bagus Suteja, was appointed by President Sukarno in 1958, when Bali became a province.

=== Post Indonesian independence ===
The 1963 eruption of Mount Agung killed thousands, created economic havoc and forced many displaced Balinese to be transmigrated to different parts of Indonesia. Mirroring the widening of social divisions across Indonesia in the 1950s and early 1960s, Bali saw conflict between supporters of the traditional caste system, and those rejecting these traditional values. Politically, this was represented by opposing supporters of the Indonesian Communist Party (PKI) and the Indonesian Nationalist Party (PNI), with tensions and ill-feeling further increased by the PKI's land reform programs.

An attempted coup in Jakarta was put down by forces led by General Suharto. The army became the dominant power as it instigated a violent anti-communist purge, in which the army blamed the PKI for the coup. Most estimates suggest that at least 500,000 people were killed across Indonesia, with an estimated 80,000 killed in Bali, equivalent to 5% of the island's population. With no Islamic forces involved as in Java and Sumatra, upper-caste PNI landlords led the extermination of PKI members. As a result of the 1965–66 upheavals, Suharto was able to manoeuvre Sukarno out of the presidency, and his "New Order" government re-established relations with western countries.

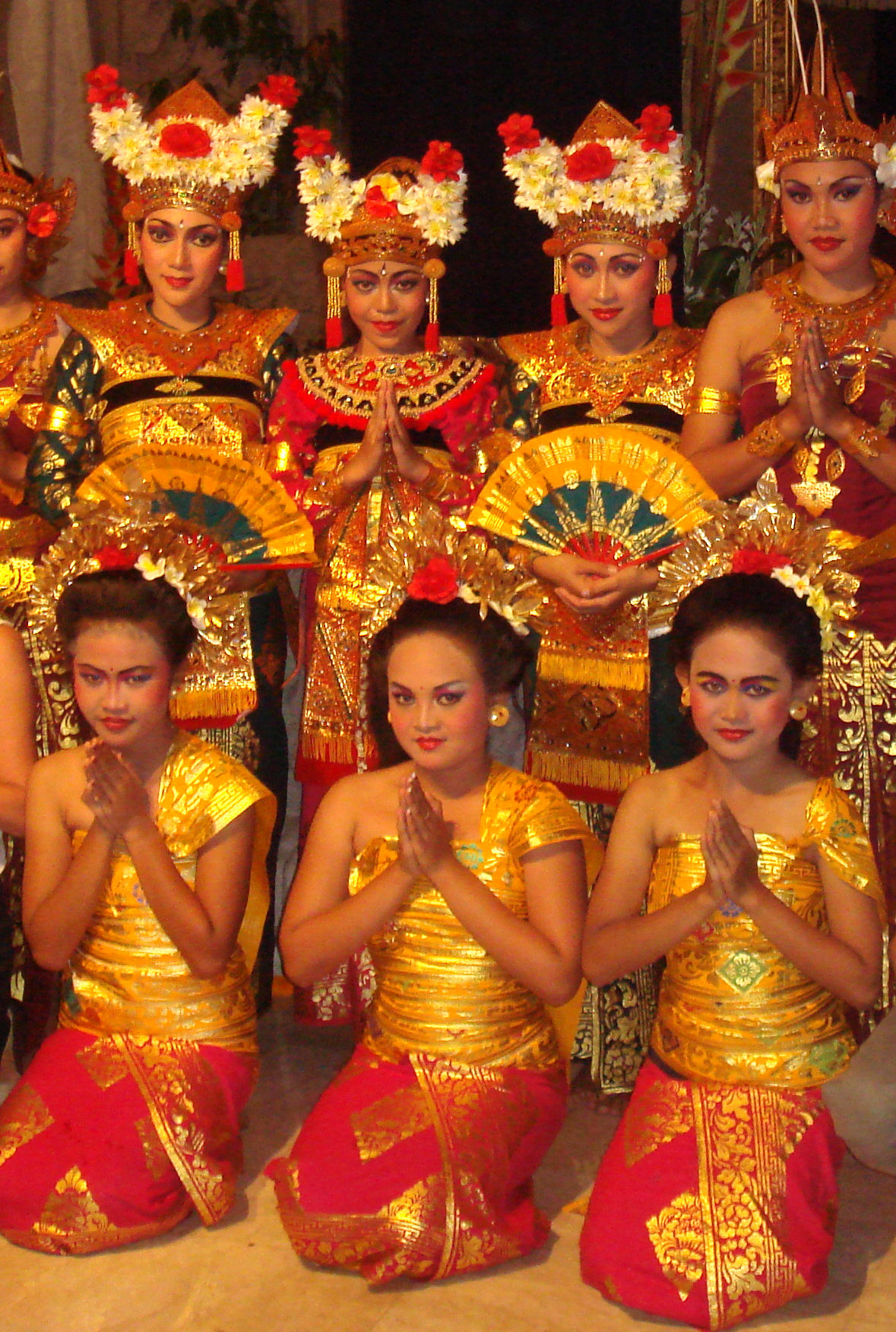
Balinese dancers show for tourists, Ubud.

The pre-War Bali as "paradise" was revived in a modern form, and the resulting large growth in tourism has led to a dramatic increase in Balinese standards of living and significant foreign exchange earned for the country. Rather than destroy Bali's culture, "in Bali's case, tourism has helped to reinforce a separate sense of Balinese identity, and given Balinese players in Indonesian society the means by which to support their island's idea of uniqueness".

In 1999, about 30,000 hotel rooms were available for tourists. As of 2004, the island achieves over 1,000,000 visitors per year, versus an initial "planned" level of 500,000 visitors, leading to overdevelopment and environmental deterioration: "The result has been polluted and eroded beaches, shortages of water, and a deterioration of the quality of life of most Balinese". Political trouble has also affected the island, as the bombing in 2002 by militant Islamists in the tourist area of Kuta killed 202 people, mostly foreigners. This attack, and another in 2005, severely affected tourism, bringing much economic hardship to the island.

Professor Adrian Vickers wrote in 2004 that "the challenge of the twenty-first century will be to restore tourism while making Bali livable". Tourism has strongly picked up again, with a 28% increase in the first quarter of 2008 with 446,000 arrivals. By the end of 2008, tourism in Bali had fully recovered, with more than 2 million visitors, but the long term livability of Bali, plagued with overdevelopment and traffic jams, remains an issue.

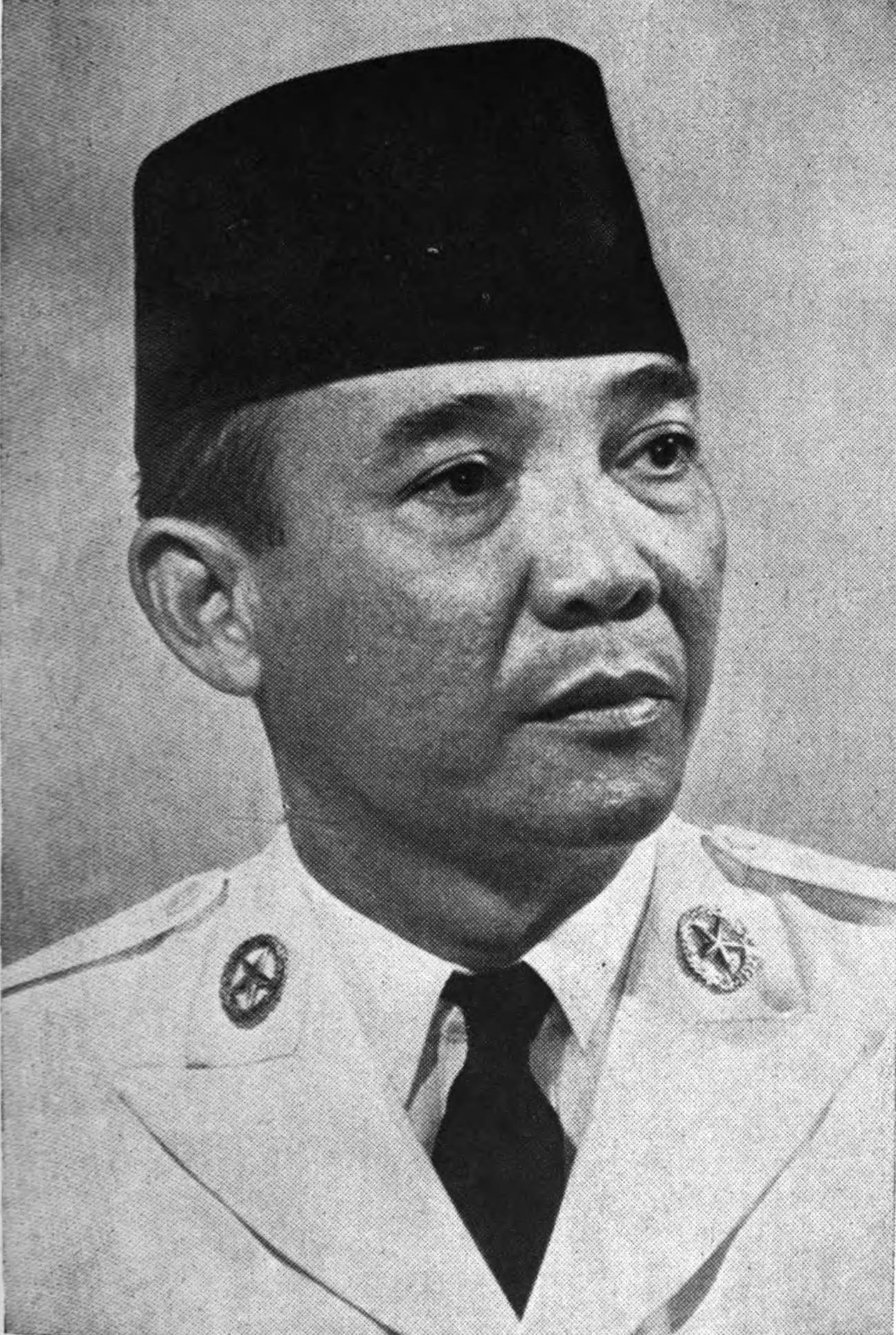
Sukarno, President of Indonesia (1945–1967), had a Balinese mother.

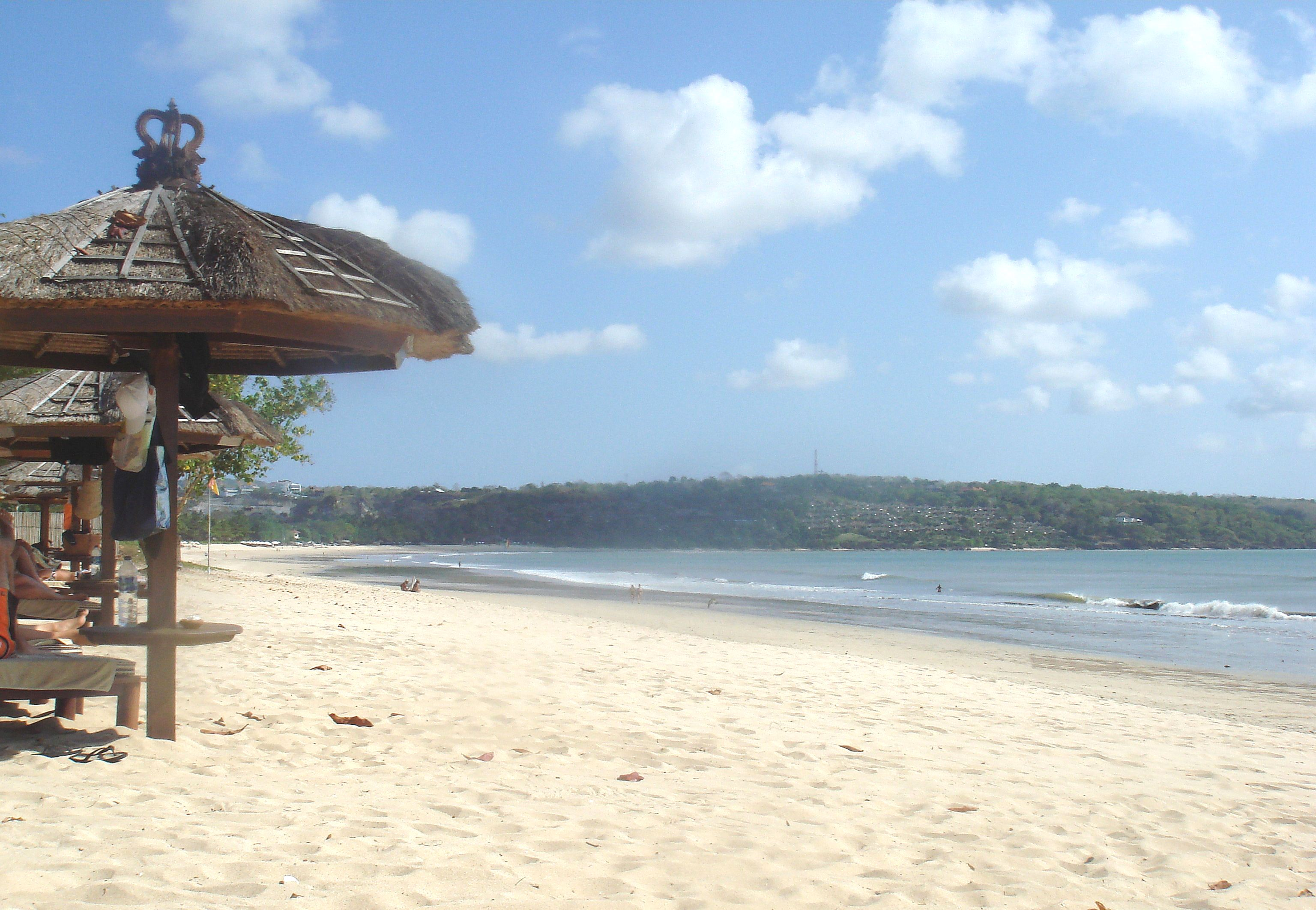
Jimbaran beach. Tourism has been supporting the island's development.

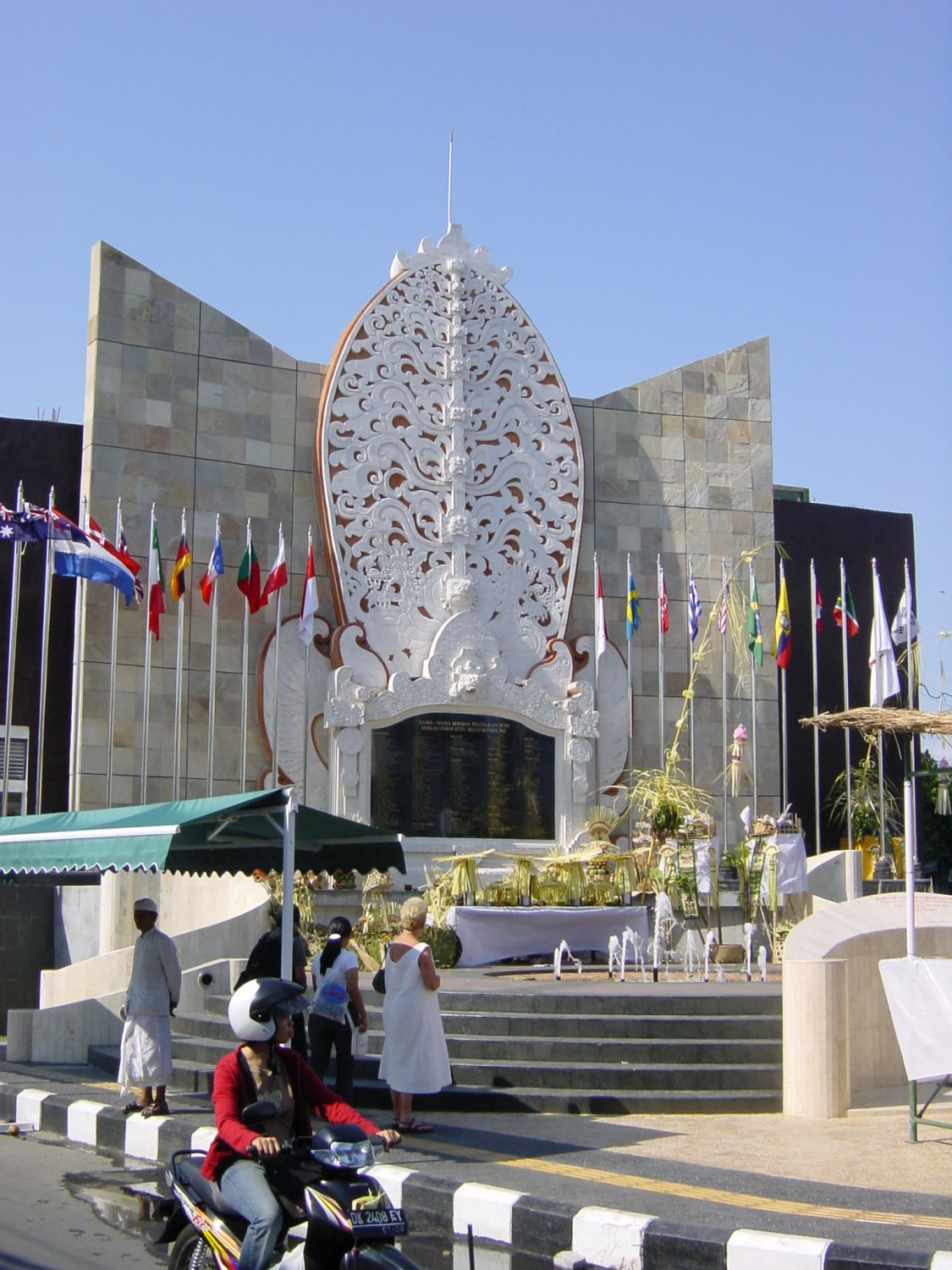
Bali bombing monument

== See also ==
- Bali Kingdom
- List of monarchs of Bali
- Bali Museum
