= Barong (mythology) =

Character in Balinese mythology

Barong ᬩᬭᭀᬂ
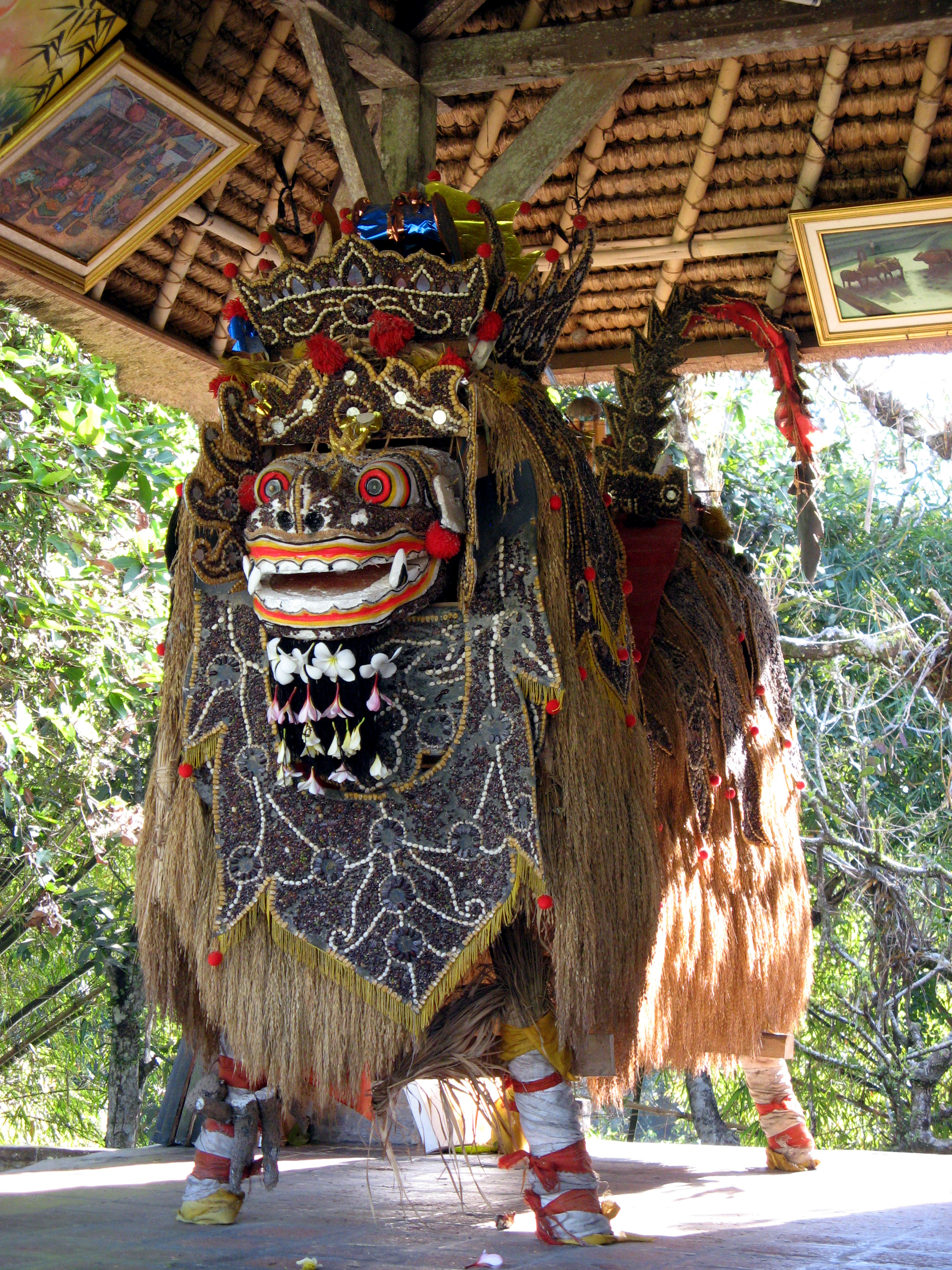
- Barong, a Balinese mythological creature

Creature information
- Folklore: Balinese mythology

Origin
- Country: Indonesia
- Region: Bali

Barong (Balinese: ᬩᬭᭀᬂ, lit. 'bear') is a panther-like creature and character in the Balinese culture of Bali, Indonesia. He is the king of the spirits, leader of the hosts of good, and enemy of Rangda, the demon queen and mother of all spirit guarders in the mythological traditions of Bali. The battle between Barong and Rangda is featured in the Barong dance to represent the eternal battle between good and evil.

== Origin ==
Barong animal mask dance, together with sanghyang dance, are considered native Balinese dances, probably predating Hindu influences. The native Indonesians of Austronesian heritage often have similar mask dances that represent either ancestral or natural spirits; an example is Dayak's Hudoq dance or any similar bear worship practice. The term barong is thought to have been derived from the local term bahruang, which today corresponds to the Indonesian word beruang which means "bear". It refers to a good spirit, that takes the form of an animal as the guardian of the forest (compare to bear worship).

In Balinese mythology, the good spirit is identified as Banas Pati Raja. Banas Pati Raja is the fourth "brother" or spirit child that accompanies a child throughout their life, which is a similar concept to guardian angels. Banas Pati Raja is the spirit that animates Barong. A protector spirit, he is often represented as a lion. The Barong is often portrayed as accompanied by two monkeys.

Barong is portrayed as a lion with a red head, covered in thick white fur, and wearing gilded jewellery adorned with pieces of mirrors. The shape of the lion Barong is somewhat similar to a Pekingese dog. The origins of the Barong are far back in time and quite uncertain. Its origins could be from animist worship, before Hinduism appeared, when villagers still believed in the supernatural protective power of animals.

=== Calon Arang ===
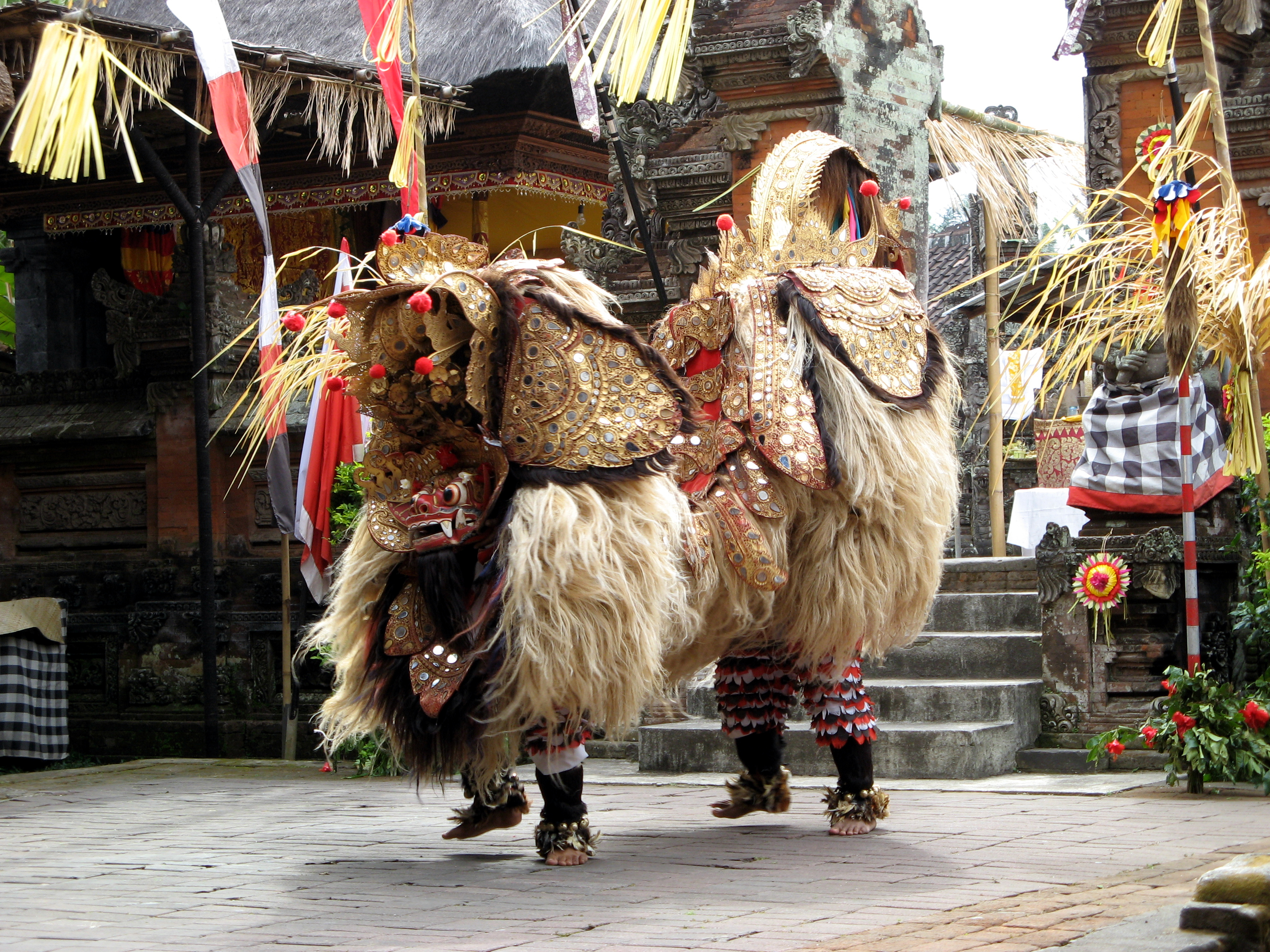
Barong, a mythical lion-like creature

Rangda is Barong's opposite. While Barong represents good, Rangda represents evil. Rangda is known as a demon queen, the incarnation of Calon Arang, the legendary witch that wreaked havoc in ancient Java during the reign of Airlangga in the tenth century. It is said that Calon Arang was a widow who had mastered the art of black magic, who often damaged farmers' crops and caused disease to come. She had a girl, named Ratna Manggali, who, though beautiful, could not get a husband because people were afraid of her mother. Because of the difficulties faced by her daughter, Calon Arang was angry, and she intended to take revenge by kidnapping a young girl. She brought the girl to a temple to be sacrificed to the goddess Durga. The next day, a great flood engulfed the village, and many people died. The disease also appeared.

King Airlangga, who had heard of this matter, then asked his advisor, Empu Bharada, to deal with this problem. Empu Bharada then sent his disciple, Empu Bahula, to be married to Ratna. Both were married with a huge feast that lasted seven days and seven nights, and the situation returned to normal. Calon Arang had a book that contained magic incantations. One day, this book was found by Empu Bahula, who turned it over to Empu Bharada. As soon as Calon Arang knew that the book had been stolen, she became angry and decided to fight Empu Bharada. Without the help of Durga, Calon Arang was defeated. Since she was defeated, the village was safe from the threat of Calon Arang's black magic.

=== Rangda ===
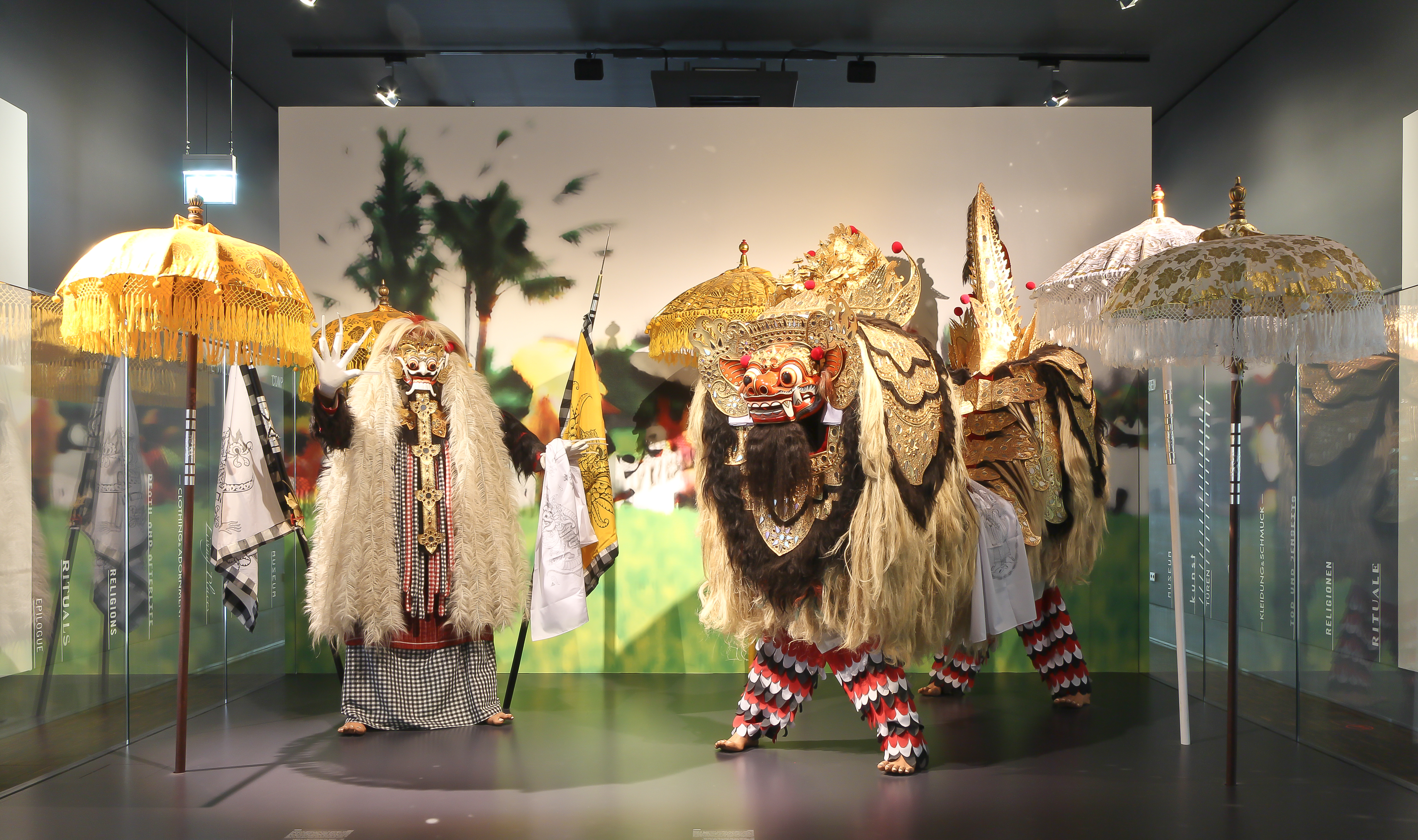
Rangda and Barong

Another version holds that Rangda was linked to the historical queen Mahendradatta or Gunapriyadharmapatni, a Javanese princess, sister of Dharmawangsa of the East Javanese Ishana dynasty of the late Mataram kingdom period. She was the queen consort of the Balinese king Udayana and Airlangga's mother. Mahendradatta is known for her devotion to the worship of Durga in Bali. The story goes that Mahendradatta, the mother of Airlangga, was condemned by Airlangga's father because she practiced black magic. After she became a widow (Rangda in old Javanese means: 'widow'), hurt and humiliated, she sought revenge upon her ex-husband's court and the whole of his kingdom. She summoned all the evil spirits in the jungle, the Leyaks and the demons that caused plague and death in the kingdom. Airlangga had to face his mother to save the kingdom. A fight occurred, but she and her black magic troops were so powerful that Airlangga had to ask for the help of the spirit king, Barong to defeat her. Barong came with Airlangga's soldiers, and a fight ensued. Rangda cast a spell that made all of Airlangga's soldiers feel suicidal, pointing their poisoned keris into their stomachs and chests. In response, Barong cast a spell that caused the soldiers' bodies to be resistant to the sharp keris. In the end, Barong won, and Rangda ran away.

== Barong dance ==
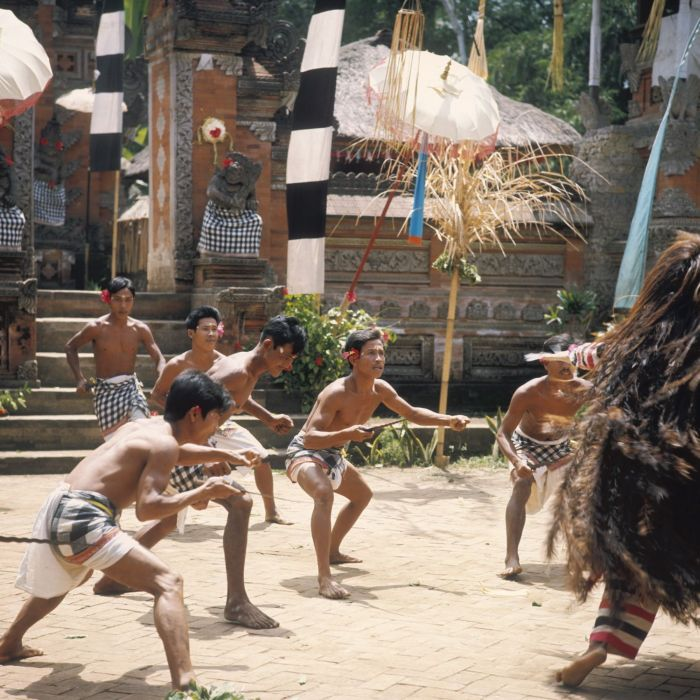
Barong dance performance with kris-wielding dancers and Rangda in Bali.

The lion is the popular one, as it comes from the Gianyar region, where Ubud (the home of tourists' Balinese dance ritual viewing) is located. Within the calon arang, the dance drama in which the Barong appears, the Barong responds to Rangda's use of magic to control and kill her to restore balance. In traditional Barong dance performances, he is portrayed in his struggles against Rangda, which is the popular part of Balinese culture. The mythical creature would dance along the street to the calon arang dance. A priest would throw holy water at it.

- The dance opens with two playful monkeys teasing Barong in a peaceful environment.
- The next scene is popularly known as "Keris Dance". The Rangda character appears and wreaks havoc. She casts black magic upon male dancers, who represent Airlangga's soldiers, and orders them to commit suicide. In a trance, these men stab themselves on their chest with their own kris. Meanwhile, Barong and the priest cast protective magic on these men, which makes them invulnerable to sharp objects.
- The dance ends with the final battle between Barong and Rangda, concluding with the victory of Barong over Rangda. Rangda runs away, the evil is defeated, and the celestial order is restored.

== Variations ==
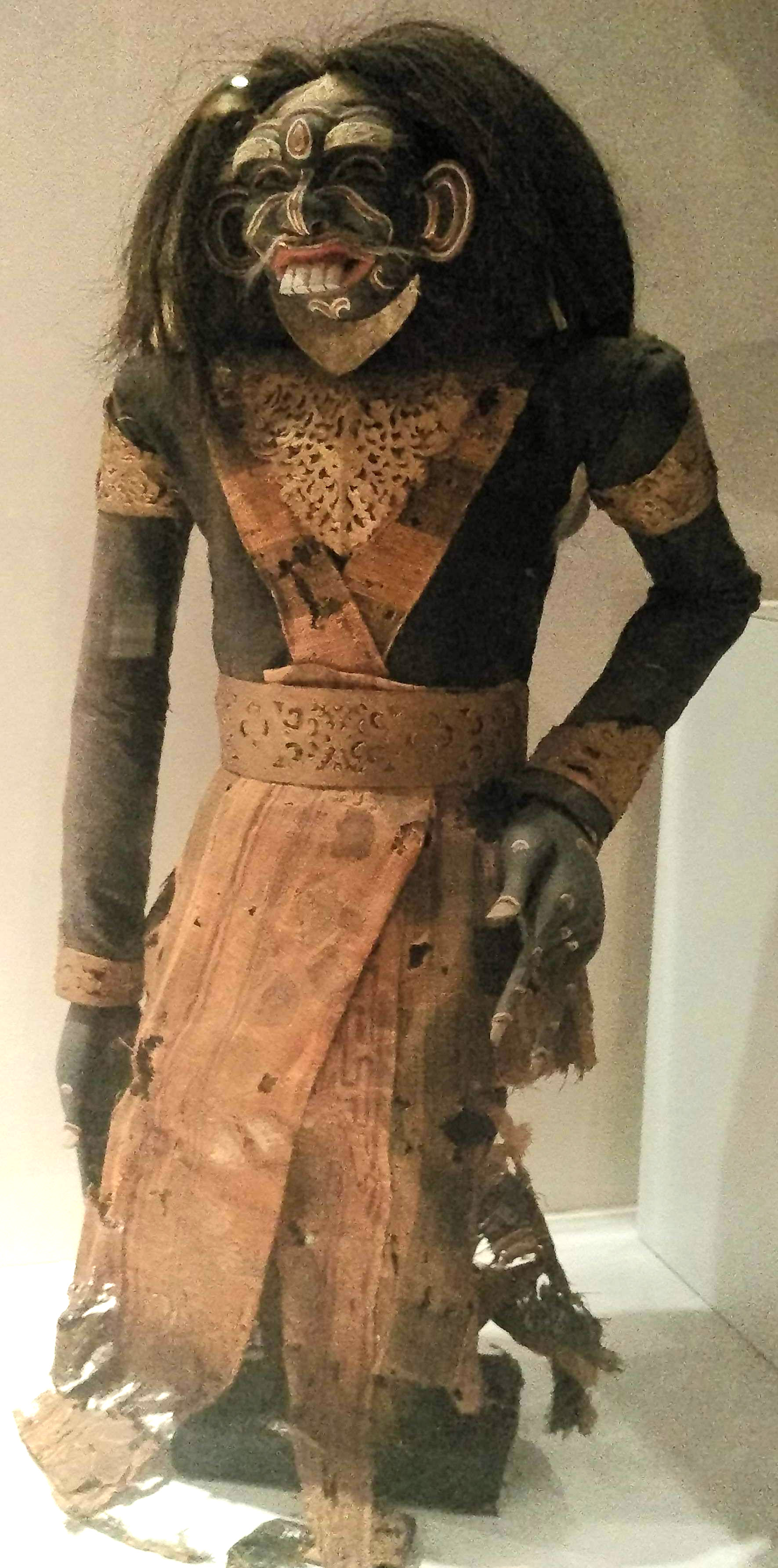
Barong Landung miniature in National Museum, Jakarta

The lion barong is one of the five traditional Barongs. In Bali, each region of the island has its own protective spirit for its forests and lands. Each Barong for each region is modeled after a different animal. They are:

=== Barong Ket ===
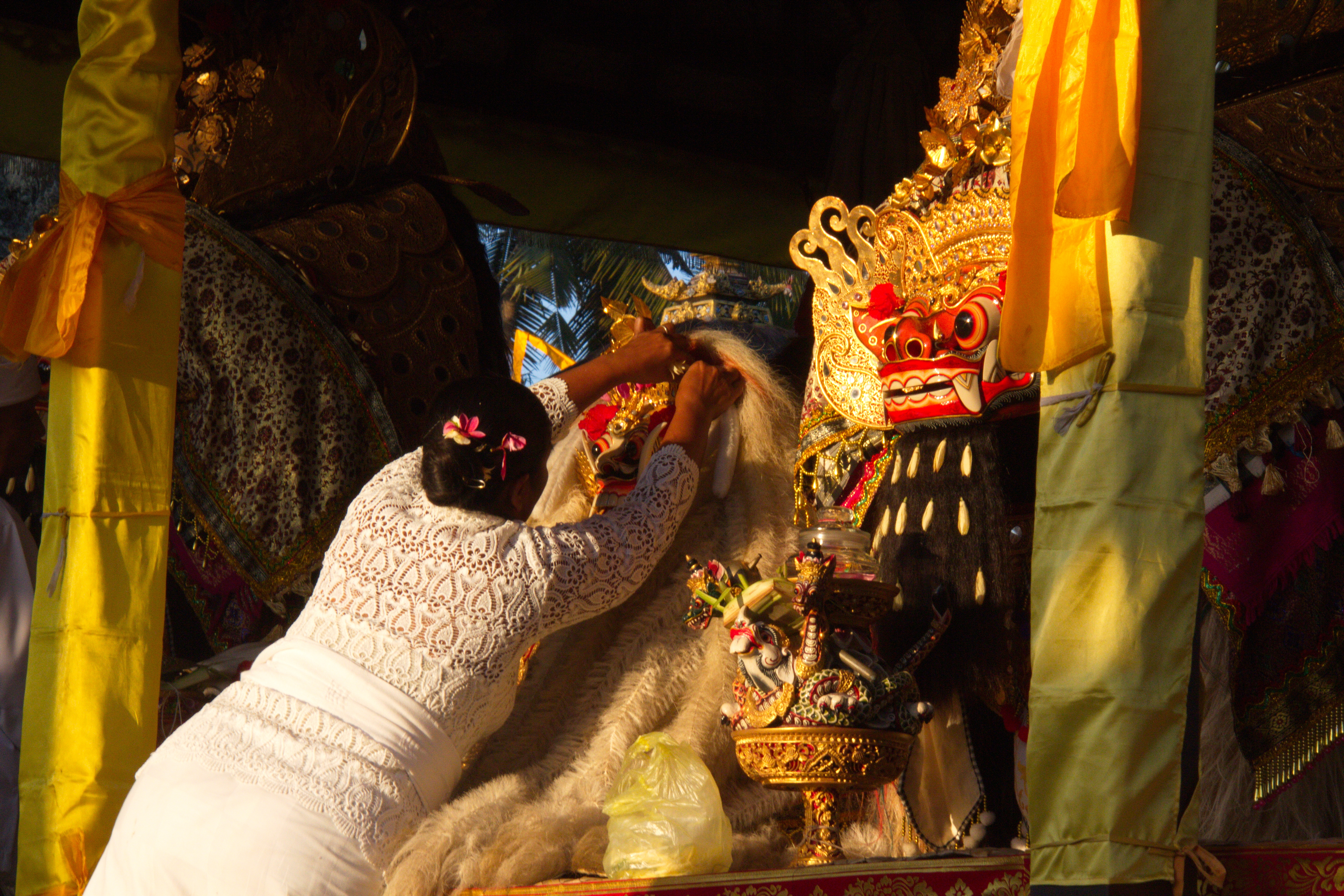
Barong Ket & Rangda

Lion barong as banaspati raja means king of the jungle, the most common Barong, it is the symbol of a good spirit, headdress uses sekar taji made of carved leather, sliced with prada and added with some small mirror decoration.

=== Barong Bangkal ===
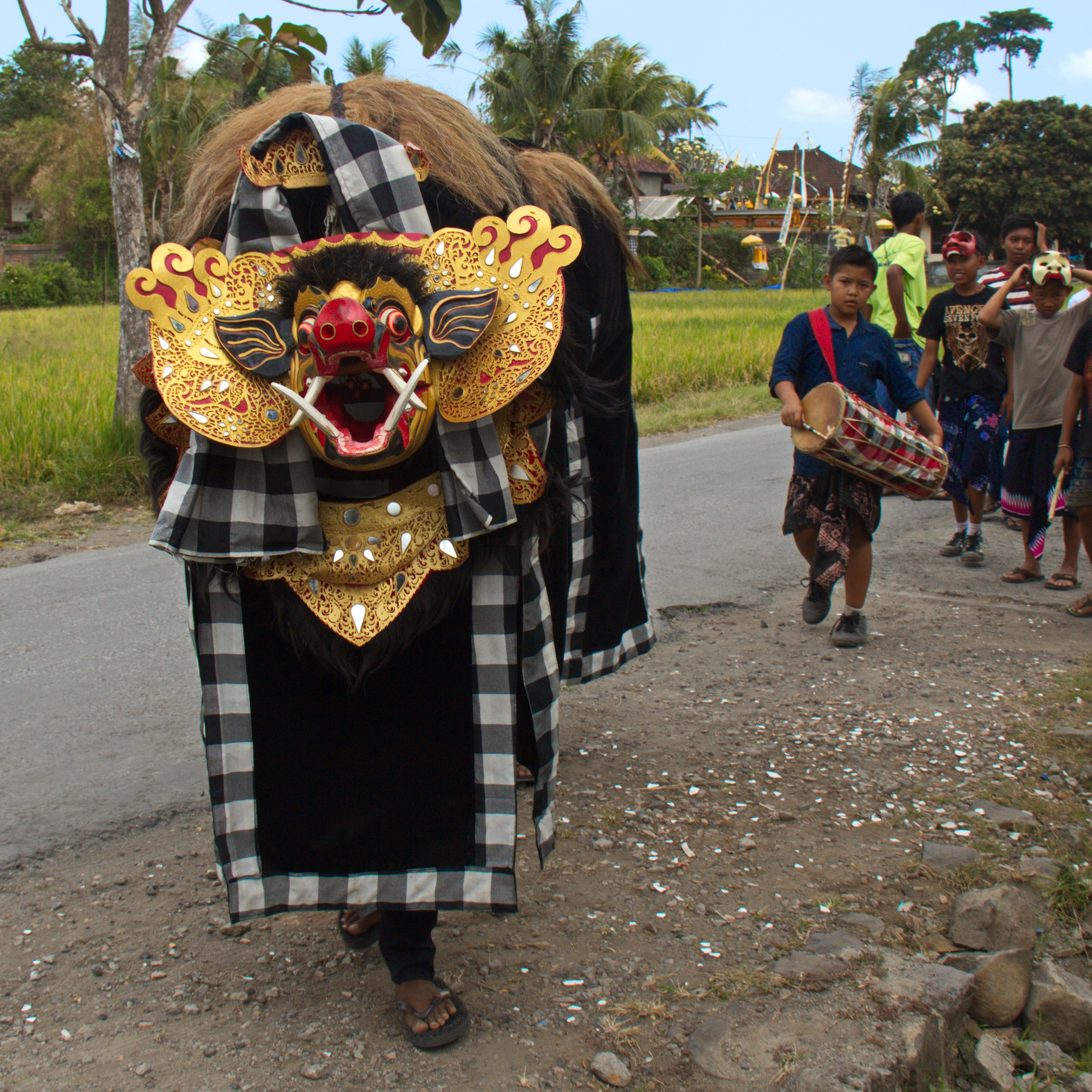
Barong Bangkung in Indonesia

Bangkal or Bangkung is an old pig in Bali and is considered a mythical animal that has strength. It is made of velvet fabric. Paraded on Galungan and Kuningan holidays.

=== Barong Macan ===
Barong, shaped like a tiger that lives in the forest, has fur that resembles a tiger's fur made of velvet fabric. Tigers are famous mythical animals in stories in Bali, especially tantri.

=== Barong Asu ===
A very sacred barong asu, portrayed as a dog, is in Pacung, Tabanan. paraded especially on Galungan and Kuningan holidays.

=== Barong Gajah ===
The shape resembles an elephant from India. Barong is paraded around the village on Galungan and Kuningan holidays.

=== Barong Landung ===
Barong landung has a different form with barongs in Bali. This barong is not danced by 2 dancers as in general, this barong manifests like a male and female doll, which are called 'Jero Luh' and 'Jero Gede', the form is similar to Betawi Ondel-ondel.

== See also ==
- Rangda
- Folklore of Indonesia
- Balinese dance
- Balinese theater
- Balinese art
- Dance of Indonesia
- Village Goddess
- Hudoq
- Barongsai
- Chhota Bheem and the Throne of Bali
- Lakhey
- Baromon, a character from Digimon franchise.
