= Makutawangsa =

King of Mataram
- Reign: ? - 990
- Predecessor: Ishanatunggawijaya
- Successor: Dharmawangsa Teguh
- Issue: Dharmaswangsa Teguh; Mahendradatta
Regnal name
- Sri Makutawangsa Wardhana
- House: Ishana
- Father: Lokapala
- Mother: Ishanatunggawijaya

Sri Makutawangsa Wardhana was the Hindu king of Mataram kingdom, in East Java, that ruled prior to 990s CE. He was the son and the successor of Queen Isyana Tunggawijaya and King Sri Lokapala. He belongs to the Isyana dynasty, established by his grandfather, Mpu Sindok that ruled Java circa the 10th century CE.

== Reign ==
Nothing much known from Makutawangsa's reign. The Pucangan inscription mentioned that he was the grandfather of King Airlangga. The inscription mentioned that he was the heir and successor of Queen Isyana and King Lokapala, he also the grandson of Mpu Sindok. The Pucangan inscription also mentioned another king named Dharmawangsa Teguh, however the exact relation between King Makutawangsa and Dharmawangsa was not clearly described. The inscription mentioned that King Makutawangsa Wardhana had a daughter named Mahendradatta also known as Gunapriya Dharmapatni. She was the queen of Bali, betrothed to King Udayana of Balinese Warmadewas. Queen Mahendradatta was the mother of Airlangga. It was known that King Dharmawangsa Teguh began his reign in 991 CE, thus historians believed that Dharmawangsa was the brother of Mahendradatta, thus both are offspring of Makutawangsa Wardhana.

== Bibliography ==
- Marwati Poesponegoro & Nugroho Notosusanto. 1990. Sejarah Nasional Indonesia Jilid II. Jakarta: Balai Pustaka
- Slamet Muljana. 1979. Nagarakretagama dan Tafsir Sejarahnya. Jakarta: Bhratara

Preceded by Isyana Tunggawijaya	Monarch of Mataram Kingdom; 985? – 990/1	Succeeded by Dharmawangsa
