= Rangda =

Demon Queen of the Leyaks

Rangda ᬭᬗ᭄ᬤ
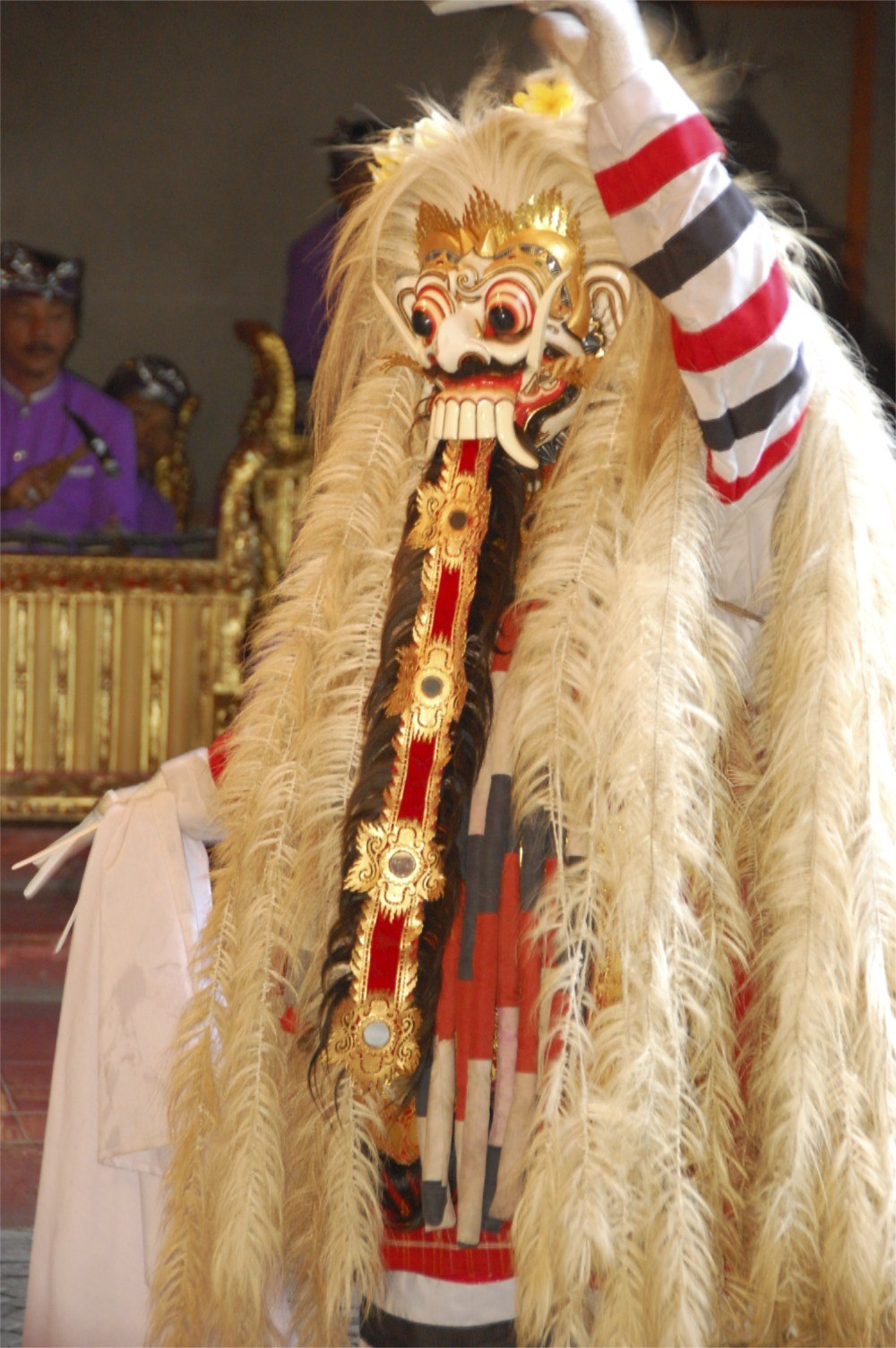
- Rangda in Balinese Barong dance drama

Creature information
- Folklore: Balinese mythology

Origin
- Country: Indonesia
- Region: Bali

Rangda (Balinese: ᬭᬗ᭄ᬤ) is the demon queen of the Leyaks in Bali, according to traditional Balinese mythology. Terrifying to behold, the child-eating Rangda leads an army of evil witches against the leader of the forces of good — Barong. The battle between Barong and Rangda is featured in a Barong dance which represents the eternal battle between good and evil.

Rangda is a term in old Javanese that means "widow".

== Description ==
Rangda is important in Balinese culture, and performances depicting her struggles with Barong or with Airlangga are popular tourist attractions as well as traditions. She is depicted as a mostly nude old woman, with long and unkempt hair, pendulous breasts, and claws. Her face is traditionally a horrifying fanged and goggle-eyed mask, with a long, protruding tongue.

== History ==
Bali is a Hindu island, and it is suggested that Rangda may also be closely associated with Durga. She is also considered similar to the Hindu warrior goddess Kali, the goddess of destruction, transformation, and protection in Hinduism.

While Rangda is similar to Durga (or Kali) in some cases, she is mostly considered by many as the personification of evil, unlike Durga who is seen as a benevolent mother goddess of fertility and destruction in Northeastern India, particularly in Assam and Tripura.

Rangda was linked to the legend of Calon Arang and also the legend of the divorced and exiled Javanese queen Mahendradatta. The name Rangda in old Javanese and Balinese language means "widow".

=== Calon Arang ===
Rangda is known as a Leyak queen, the incarnation of Calon Arang, the legendary witch that wreaked havoc in ancient Java during the reign of Airlangga in the late 10th century. It is said that Calon Arang was a widow, who had mastered the art of black magic, who often damaged farmers' crops and caused disease to come. She had a daughter, named Ratna Manggali, who, though beautiful, could not get a husband because people were afraid of her mother. Because of the difficulties faced by her daughter, Calon Arang was angry and she intended to take revenge by kidnapping a young girl. She brought the girl to a temple of Death to be sacrificed to the goddess Durga. The next day, a great flood engulfed the village and many people died. Disease also appeared.

King Airlangga, who had heard of this matter, then asked for his advisor, Empu Bharada, to deal with this problem. Empu Bharada then sent his disciple, Empu Bahula, to be married to Ratna. Both were married with a huge feast that lasted seven days and seven nights, and the situation returned to normal. Calon Arang had a book that contained magic incantations. One day, this book was found by Empu Bahula, who turned it over to Empu Bharada. As soon as Calon Arang knew that the book had been stolen, she became angry and decided to fight Empu Bharada. Without the help of Durga, Calon Arang was defeated. Since she was defeated, the village was safe from the threat of Calon Arang's black magic.

Other interpretations claim that Rangda was derived from the historical 11th-century queen Mahendradatta or Gunapriyadharmapatni, a Javanese princess sister of Dharmawangsa of the East Javanese Ishana dynasty of late Mataram kingdom period. She was the wife of Balinese king Udayana and Airlangga's mother. Mahendradatta is known for her devotion to the cult of Durga in Bali.

The story goes that Mahendradatta, the mother of Airlangga, was condemned and exiled by the king, Udayana, for allegedly practicing witchcraft and black magic. After she became a widow, hurt and humiliated, she sought revenge upon her ex-husband's court and the whole of his kingdom. She summoned all the evil spirits in the jungle, the Leyaks, and the demons that caused plague and death in the kingdom. She proceeded to take her revenge by killing off half the kingdom, which by then belonged to her and Dharmodayana's son Airlangga, with a plague before being overcome by a holy man.

== Gallery ==
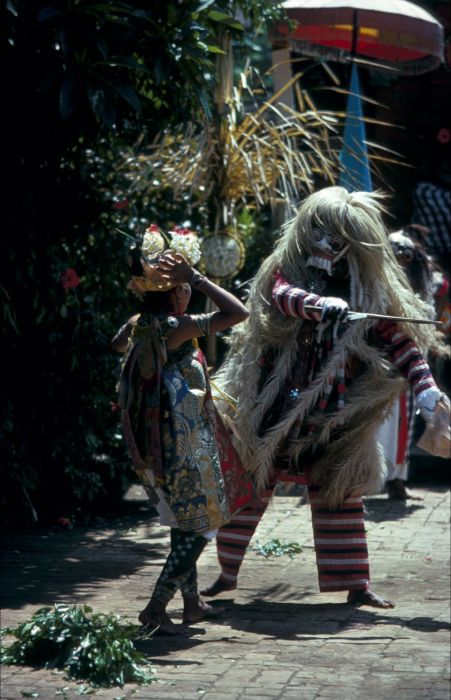
Rangda in a Barong dance scene.

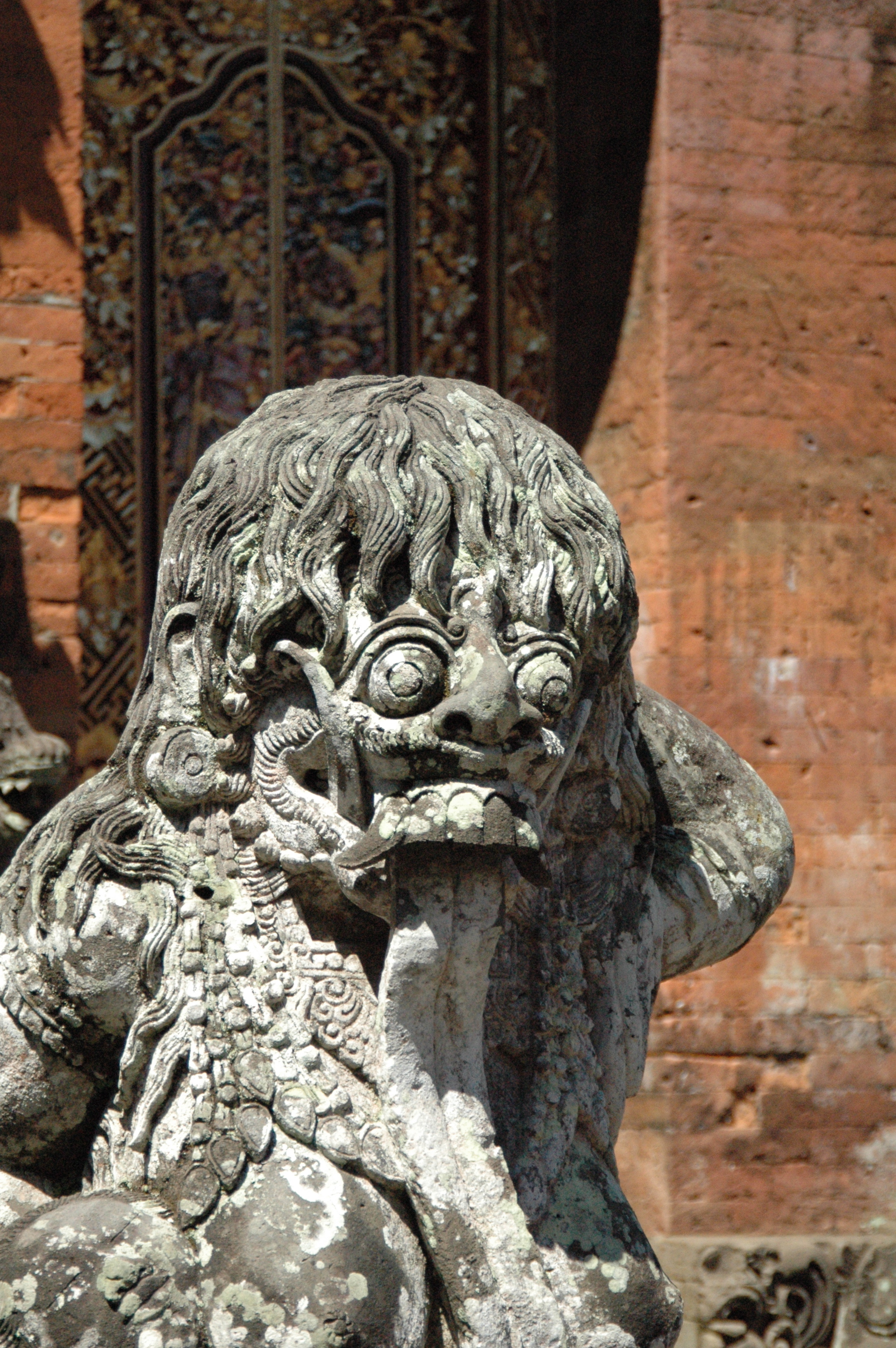
Statue of Rangda at a temple.

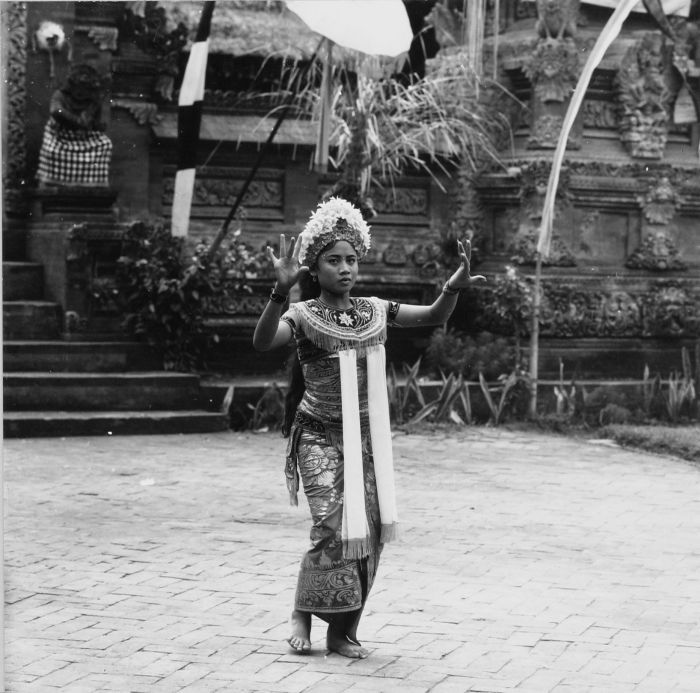
Rangda's attendant in a Barong dance.

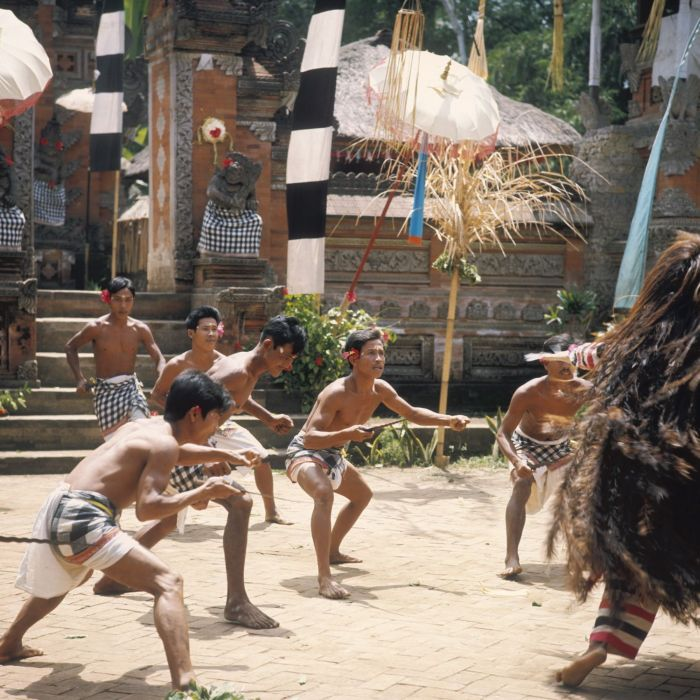
Barong dance performance with kris dancers and Rangda.

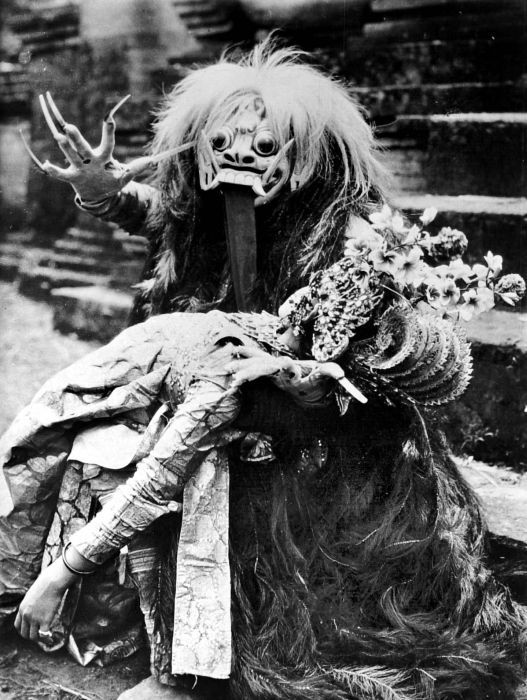
Representation of Rangda in a Barong dance.

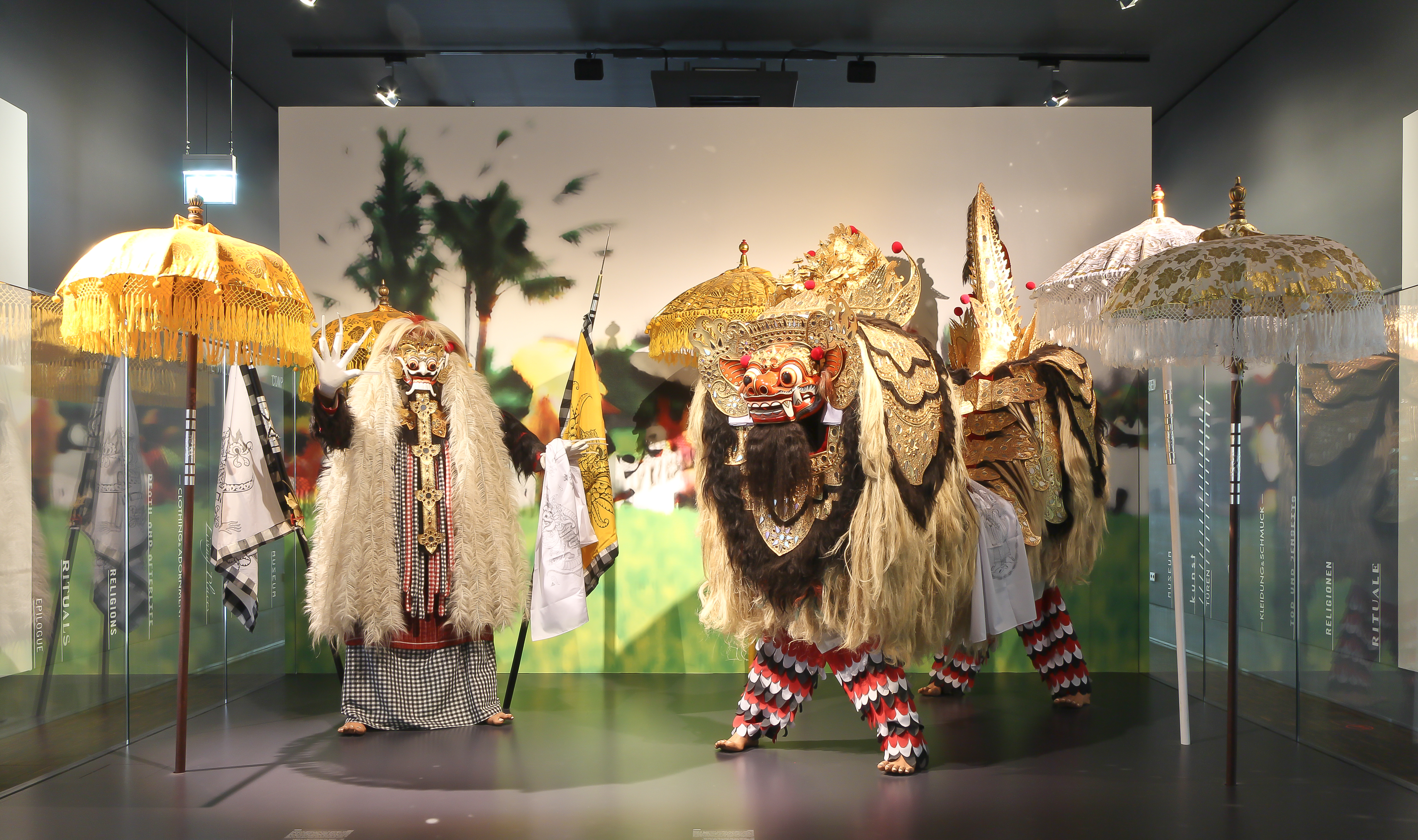
Rangda and Barong.

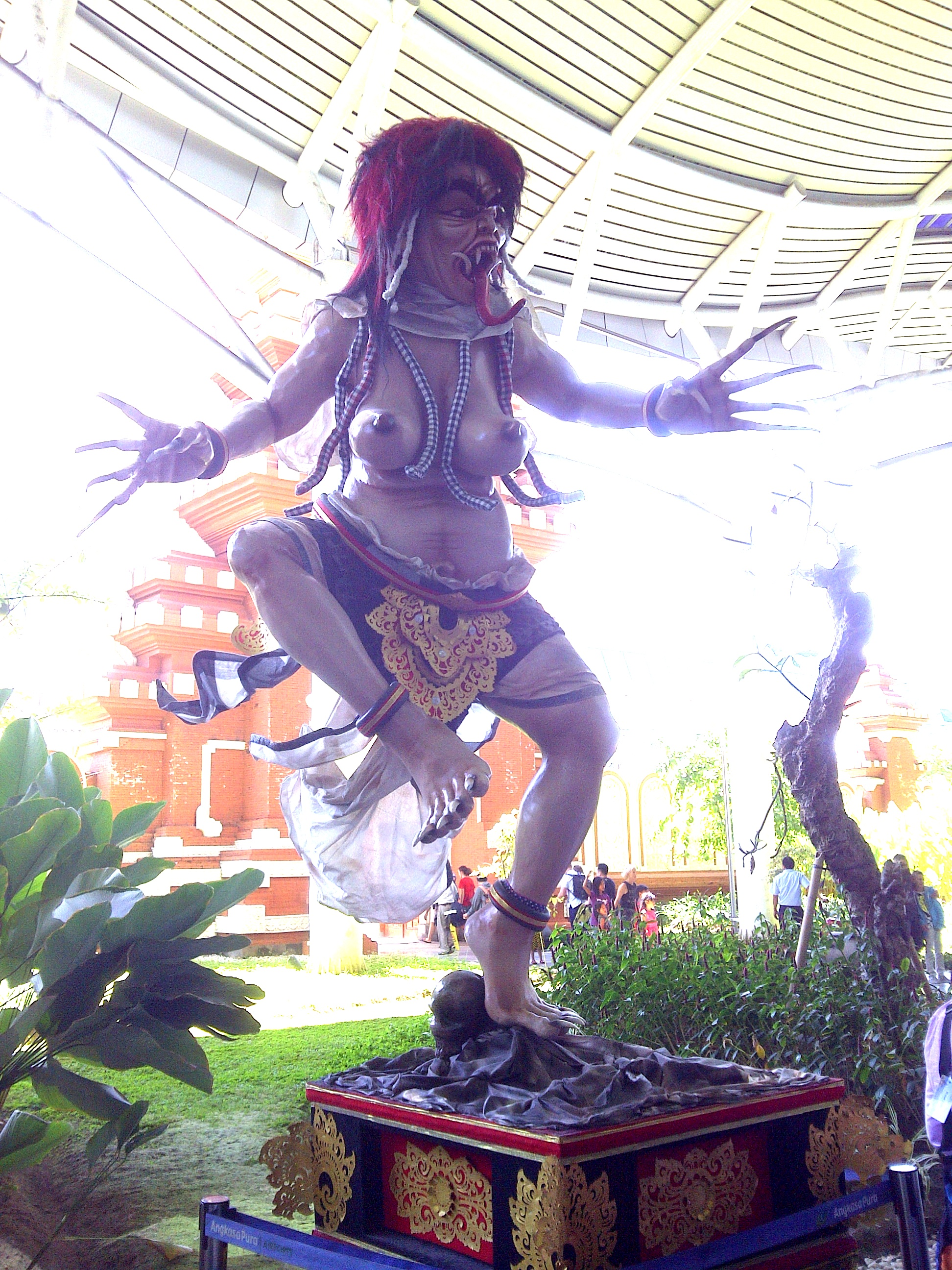
Modern Rangda statue at Ngurah Rai International Airport, Bali.

== See also ==
- Chhota Bheem and the Throne of Bali, Indian animated film with Rangda as the primary villainess.
- Barong (mythology)
- Balinese dance
- Balinese art
- Balinese theater
- Folklore of Indonesia
- Hinduism in Indonesia
- Village Goddess
- Wewe Gombel
- Sundel bolong
