= Calon Arang =

Folklore character in Javanese and Balinese culture

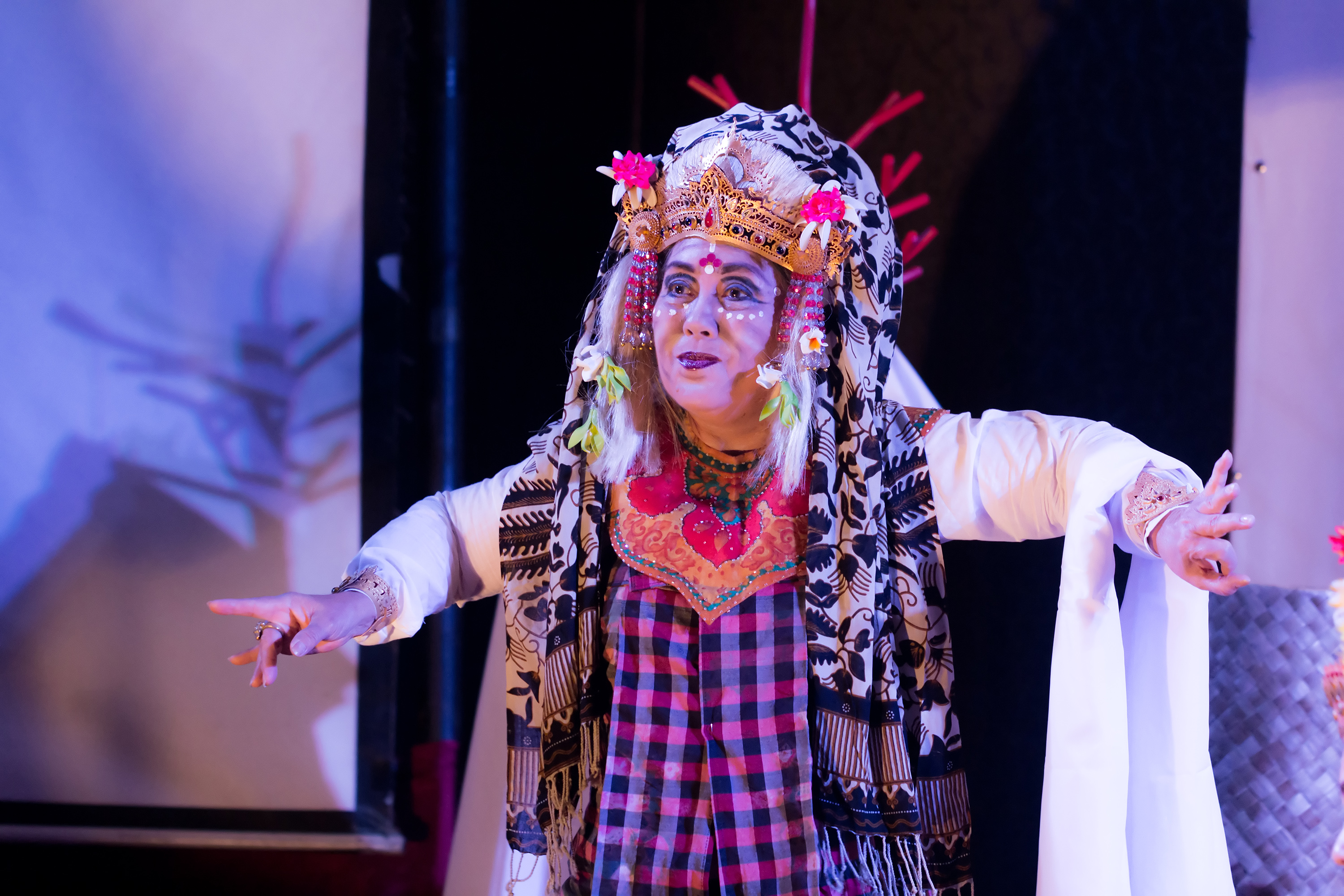
Calon Arang, as portrayed by Bulantrisna Djelantik, in a Balinese dance drama

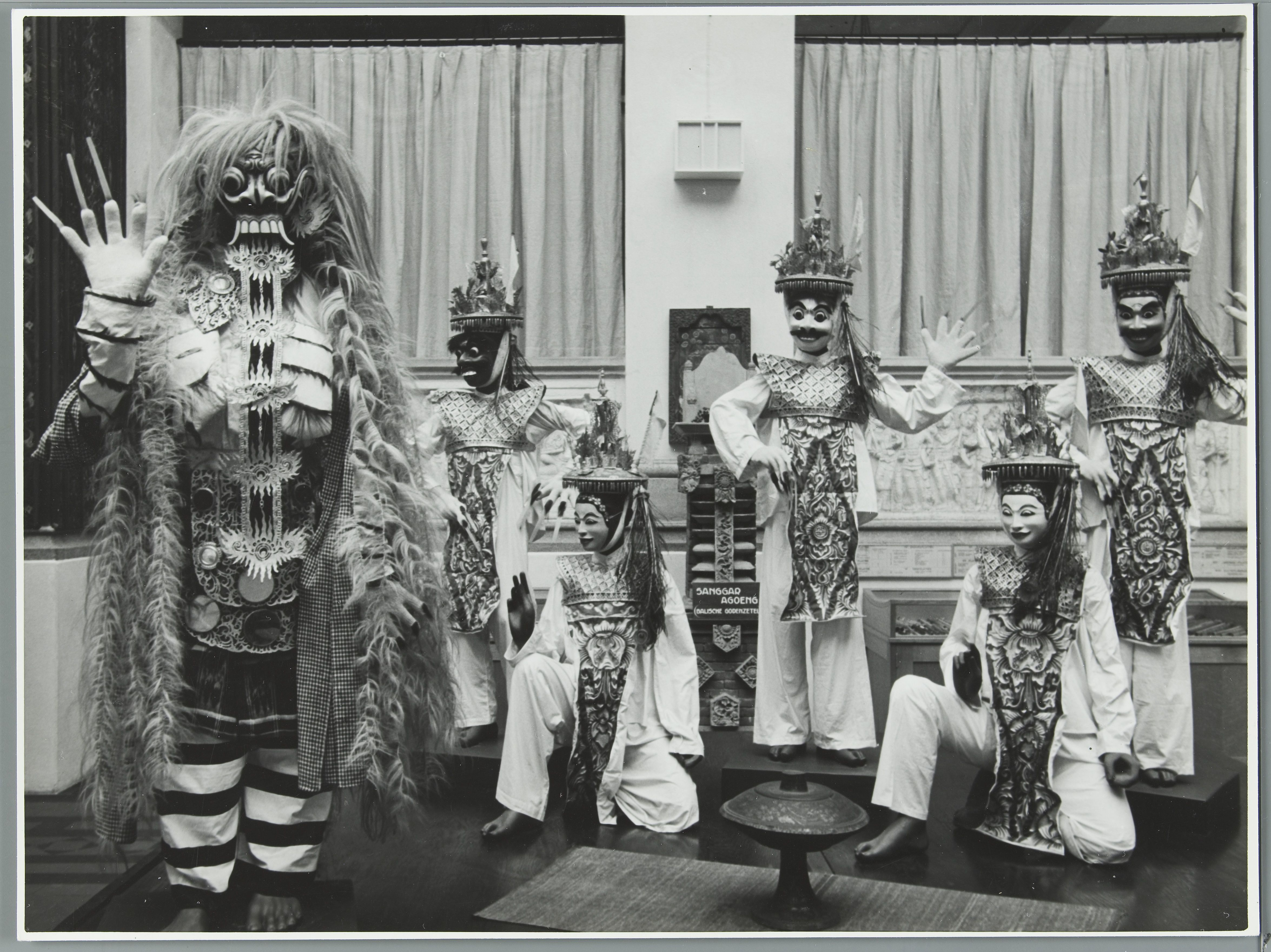
Costumes of the Calon Arang play in Wereldmuseum Amsterdam, 1940

Calon Arang is a character in Javanese and Balinese folklore dating from the 12th century. Tradition calls her a witch, a master of black magic. It is unknown who composed the story, but a manuscript of the Calon Arang text (written in the Latin alphabet) is kept in the Royal Netherlands Institute of Southeast Asian and Caribbean Studies.

== Story ==
In the village of Girah in the Kediri Kingdom long ago, in what is now Indonesia, lived a very cruel widow named Calon Arang, a witch and a black magician. She had a beautiful daughter named Ratna Manggali. But because of her ruthless nature, the people of Girah are afraid of Calon Arang, and so, Ratna Manggali had no suitors. Knowing this, Calon Arang became furious, holding all of the people in the village responsible. She decided to place a curse on Girah, and performed a dark ceremony in the cemetery by offering the sacrifice of a young girl to the Goddess Durga. Durga came down and granted the request of Calon Arang and the curse came true. A flood engulfed the village and took many people's lives. Afterward, many of the survivors became very sick with an incurable plague and died.

Word of this finally reached Airlangga, the King of Kediri, at the Royal Palace. After learning about the evil actions of Calon Arang, King Airlangga sent his army to Girah to kill her, but she was so powerful that the army had to retreat, and many of the king's soldiers were killed.

Many days after pondering the situation, King Airlangga asked his advisor, Mpu Bharadah, for help. Mpu Bharadah sent his disciple Mpu Bahula to propose to Ratna Manggali. The marriage proposal was accepted, and Mpu Bahula and Ratna Manggali hosted a marriage ceremony that lasted for seven days and seven nights. The celebration pleased Calon Arang very much as Ratna Manggali and Mpu Bahula also loved each other.

Not long after, Ratna Manggali told Bahula that Calon Arang kept a magic scroll somewhere in her room and performed ceremonies in the cemetery every night. So, at midnight, Bahula went to the place where Calon Arang lived. That night, Calon Arang slept very deeply due to the seven days and seven nights of partying at her daughter's wedding. Bahula succeeded in stealing Calon Arang's magic scroll, returned it to Mpu Bharadah, and told him all about Calon Arang's magic and ceremonies. Mpu Bharada told Bahula to go back to Girah before he was caught by his mother-in-law.

Bahula invited his master, Mpu Bharadah, to visit him in Girah. Mpu Bharadah and Calon Arang met in the Girah village cemetery. Bharada asked Calon Arang to stop practicing her evil magic because it caused so much misery among the people. But Calon Arang refused to listen to Mpu Bharadah, and eventually, she fought a fierce battle with the Kediri soldiers. Because Calon Arang didn't have the magic scroll, she could not beat Mpu Bharadah. She lost the battle and died.

Ratna Manggali wept when she found out that her mother had died, because despite Calon Arang's evil, she had always been good to her daughter. However, Ratna Manggali realized that her mother's death was for the best. Since then, the village of Girah has been happy and safe and secure.

== Interpretation and analysis ==
In Balinese tradition, most often only focused on the fierceness and the evil deeds of Calon Arang. In historical perspective, Calon Arang and her demonic form Rangda were connected with the historical figure Queen Mahendradatta of Bali, who was a princess from Java and the mother of King Airlangga. Calon Arang was often portrayed as a fierce witch with a frightening face. However, a new perspective recently emerged which took Calon Arang's side and portrayed her more sympathetic and kindly. Toeti Heraty characterizes her as the victim of demonization within a patriarchal society, as a critic of a misogynistic culture and discrimination against women.

== See also ==
- Balinese mythology
- Rangda
- Barong (mythology)
