= Śri Ajñadewi =

Śri Ajñadewi was a reigning queen of Bali, who flourished in 1016 CE.

Queen Śri Ajñadewi succeeded king Udayana Warmadewa and queen Mahendradatta, but it is unknown how she was related to them. The circumstances of her succession is not confirmed.

In the Pucangan inscription, it is noted that at this point in time, the kingdom of East Java was attacked by king Wurawari during the wedding between prince Airlangga of Bali, the son of the widower king Udayana Warmadewa, and the princess daughter of king Dharmawangsa. The attack caused chaos and resulted in the escape of prince Airlangga and, possibly, in the death of Udayana Warmadewa. It was at this point Śri Ajñadewi became ruler.

There is a theory that Śri Ajñadewi, who was likely either a member of the dynasty of East Java or the Bali dynasty, was appointed to act as trustee of the throne, because the crown prince Marakata Pangkaja was a minor, and that she ruled until he came of age. Marakata Pangkaja is known to be an adult in 1022, when an inscription confirmed that he ruled and Śri Ajñadewi was no longer ruler.

Preceded by Udayana Warmadewa and Mahendradatta	Balinese Monarchs circa 1016	Succeeded by Marakata Pangkaja
