= Gunung Kawi =

Hindu temple in Indonesia

Coordinates: 8°25′24.19″S 115°18′44.40″E

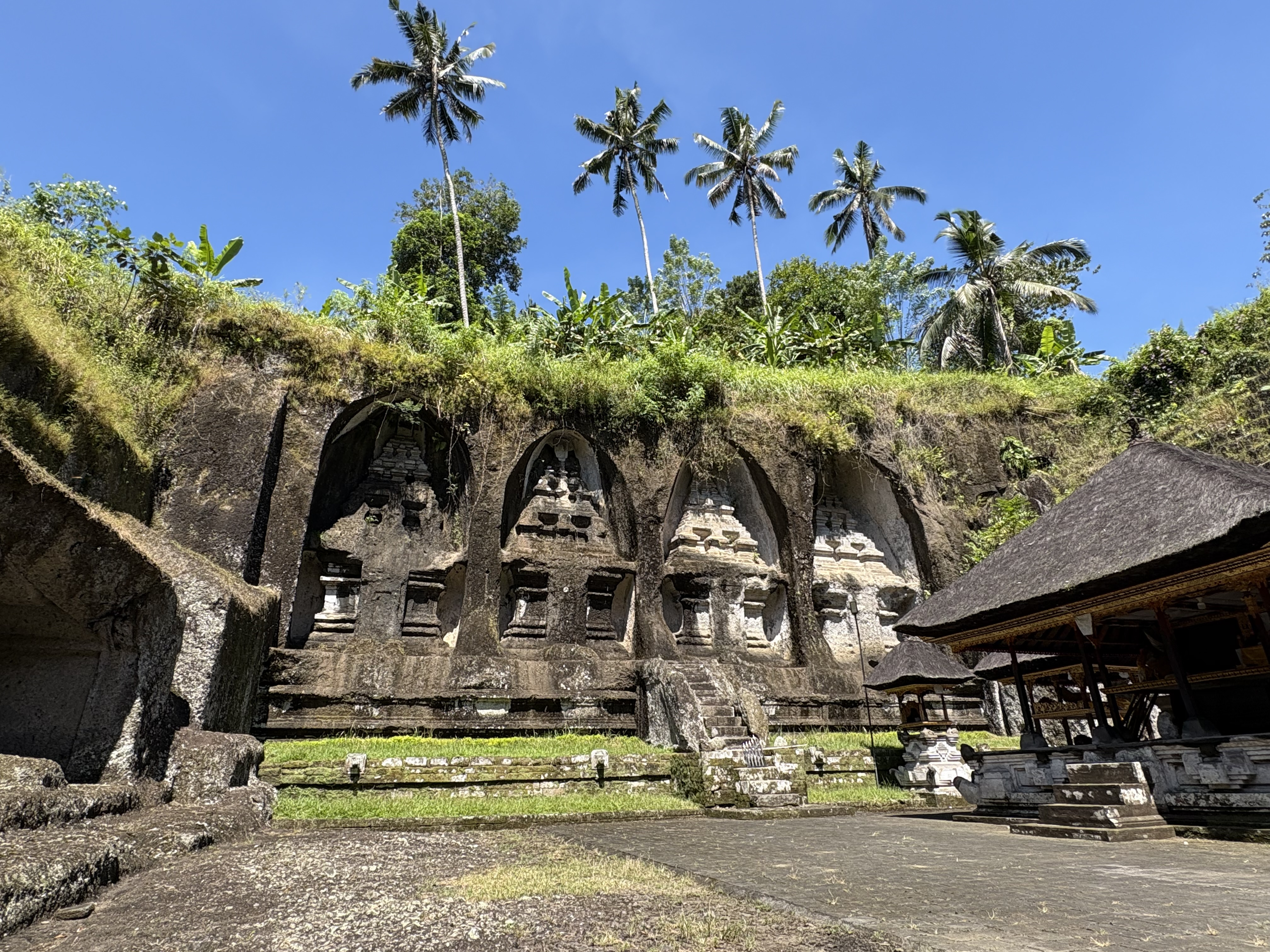
The cliff side with four candi

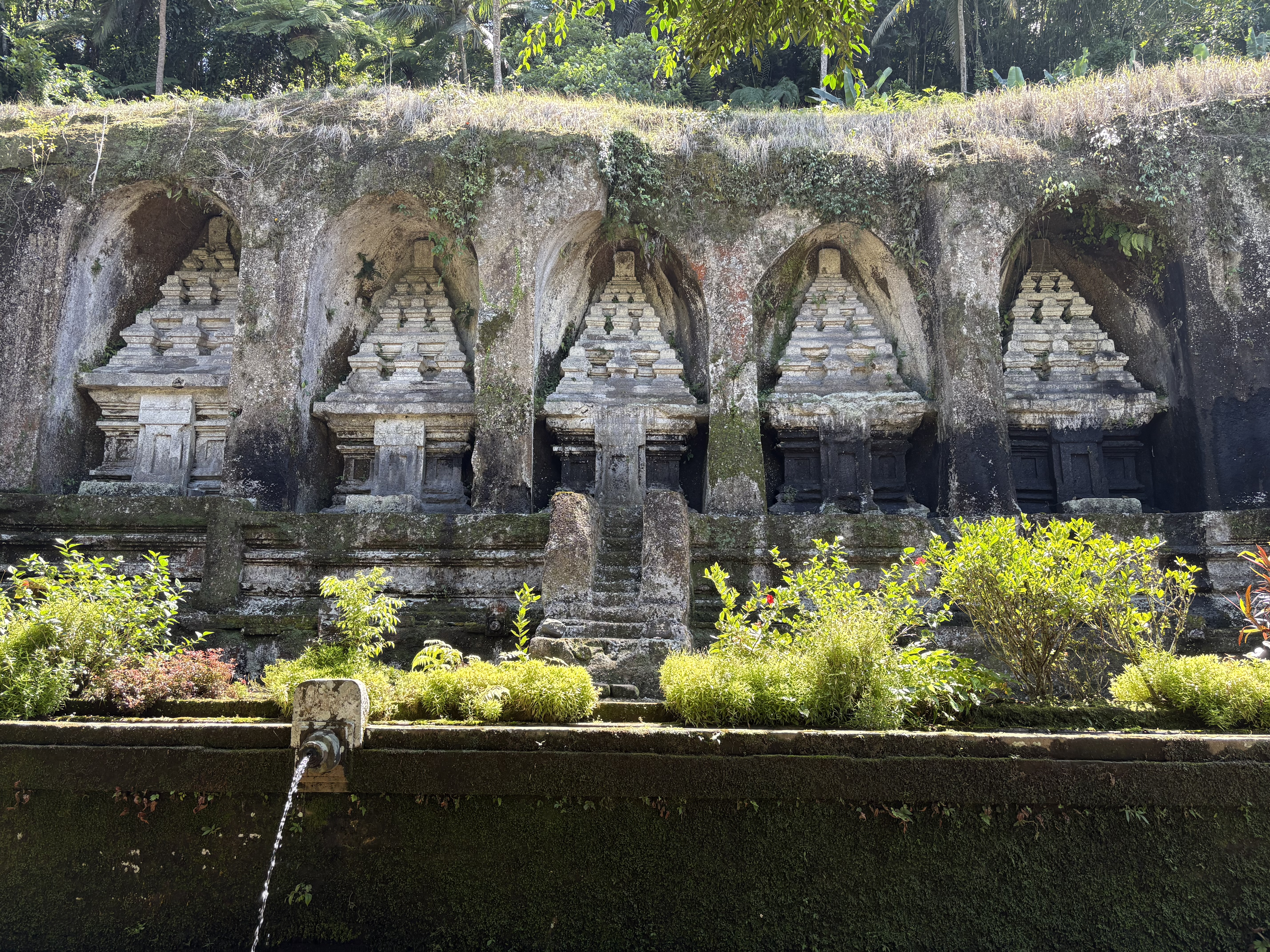
The cliff side with five candi

Gunung Kawi Temple, popularly known as The Valley of The Balinese Kings, is an 11th-century temple and funerary complex in Tampaksiring, northeast of Ubud in Bali, Indonesia, that is spread across either side of the Pakerisan river. It comprises 10 rock-cut candi (shrines) that are carved into some 7-metre-high (23 ft) sheltered niches of the sheer cliff face. These funeral monuments are thought to be dedicated to King Anak Wungsu of the Udayana dynasty and his favourite queens. On the east side there are five temples that are dedicated, according to one theory, to King Udayana, his queen Mahendradatta, and their sons Airlangga, Anak Wungsu, and Marakata. The temples on the west side are dedicated, according to the same theory, to the king's minor queens or concubines.

Inscription: on the north shrine (east side) a legible inscription reads: "Haji Lumahing Jalu," meaning "the king made a temple here."
