= Mahendradatta =

- Gunapriya Dharmapatni

Queen of Bali
- Reign: late 10th century
- Predecessor: Śri Wijaya Mahadewi
- Successor: Śri Ajñadewi
- Co-ruler: Udayana
- Born: Mahendradatta; 961 CE; Kingdom of Mataram
- Died: 1011 CE (aged 49–50); Kingdom of Bali
- Spouse: Udayana
- Issue: Airlangga; Marakata; Anak Wungçu
- Dynasty: Ishana
- Father: Makutawangsa Wardhana

Mahendradatta (961–1011 CE), also known as Gunapriya Dharmapatni, was the queen of Bali and wife of Udayana Warmadewa, also popularly known as King Udayana from Warmadewa dynasty. She was also the mother of Javanese hero-king Airlangga. Mahendradatta and Udayana co-ruled Bali, issuing inscriptions in both their names. Her other younger sons are Marakata (who later became king of Bali after the death of Udayana) and Anak Wungçu (who ascended to the Balinese throne after the death of Marakata).

== Early life ==
Gunapriyadharmapatni was born in 961 and grew up in Watugaluh Palace, Eastern Java. She was a Javanese princess of the Eastern Javanese Isyana Dynasty, the daughter of King Sri Makutawangsawarddhana of the late Mataram kingdom period. She was the sister of King Dharmawangsa of Mataram. She was later betrothed to Balinese King Udayana and moved to the island as his wife and assumed the name Mahendradatta.

== Marriage and reign ==
Her powerful position as the princess of the ruling Mataram Kingdom has led the historian to suggest that Mahendradatta was the queen regnant in Bali. Her marriage to Mataram's vassal, the Balinese Warmadewa family was a political arrangement to seal Bali as part of the Eastern Javanese Mataram realm. Her position as a powerful foreign queen has led the Balinese court to carefully respect, revere, or even fear her.

She conceived her first son, Airlangga, in her 30s, quite late of age for women in ancient Java and Bali. However, there is speculation suggesting that Mahendradatta was probably already married before Udayana. Thus Airlangga was not the biological son of King Udayana, he was conceived from her previous union to an unknown man, after her separation (either because of death or divorce) she was later betrothed to the Balinese king, and she took the baby Airlangga to Bali.

Historical sources seem to be silenced on Mahendradatta's suspected earlier marriage, that it might be a scandal or not even taken place. This suspicion was because although Airlangga was the eldest son of Mahendradatta, he was not chosen as the crown prince of Bali; his younger brother Marakata and later Anak Wungçu rose to the Balinese throne instead. Moreover, Mahendradatta sent Airlangga back to Java during his teenage. Mahendradatta was known to be promoting the cult of Durga in Bali, and curiously later associated with the Balinese legend of the evil witch Rangda, which translates to "widow".

The Balinese folklore more or less mentions the life story of Mahendradatta linked with the Balinese mythology of Rangda. The story goes that the queen was condemned and exiled by the king for allegedly practicing witchcraft and black magic. After she became a widow, hurt and humiliated, she sought revenge upon her ex-husband's court and the whole of his kingdom. She summoned all the evil spirits in the jungle, the Leyaks, and the demons that caused plague and death in the kingdom. She proceeded to take her revenge by killing off half the kingdom with a plague before being overcome by a holy man. Her seemingly bad image in Balinese folklore was might be a reflection of her actual life, that her marriage went poorly, or motivated by Balinese court politics to discredit the ruling foreign Javanese queen. Her marriage probably was not a smooth one, as the queen was up against the court of Balinese Warmadewa and her husband.

== Epigraphic and archaeological evidence ==
Mahendradatta (Gunapriya Dharmapatni) is documented in several Old Balinese inscriptions, including the Serahi inscription dated 993 CE, the Buahan inscription dated 994 CE, and the Pucangan inscription (also known as the Calcutta Stone) from 1041 CE. In a number of these records, her name appears before that of her husband Udayana Warmadewa, reflecting her prominent status as a member of the East Javanese Isyana dynasty. She was the daughter of Sri Makutawangsa Wardhana, a descendant of Mpu Sindok (Maharaja Isyana), the founder of the dynasty in the 10th century.

Archaeological remains associated with the period of Mahendradatta and Udayana are concentrated in the Pakerisan and Petanu river valleys and the highland regions of Tampaksiring, Pejeng, Bedulu, and Kintamani. These areas contain Old Bali temples such as Gunung Kawi, Kerobokan, Kelebutan, and Jukut Paku, which reflect the religious and cultural landscape of early Balinese Hinduism (often described in lontar scripts as Agama Tirtha).

== Religious adherent ==
Mahendradatta is known for her devotion to Durga. She was believed to bring the cult of Durga to Bali from Java. Although Durga is known as the consort of Shiva, in ancient Javanese and Balinese traditions, Durga is depicted as having a fierce nature, in contrast to another shakti; the benevolent Vishnu's consort Lakshmi. The cult of Durga is traditionally linked with sacrifice, black magic, and witchcraft. This led to the unpopular depiction of her, that later associated with Rangda, the evil witch in Balinese mythology.

After she died in 1011 CE, she was deified and depicted as Durga Mahisashuramardini (Durga as the slayer of Bull-demon), entombed in the temple within Pura Bukit Dharma Kutri, located in Buruan village, Blahbatu, Gianyar Regency, Bali. Within this Balinese temple compound, exist several Hindu-Buddhist statues dated from around 10th to 13th century. Those include, but not limited to the depictions of Amoghapasa, Ganesha, Bhatara, Durga Mahisasuramardhini, and Buddha.

== Modern cultural representations ==
Mahendradatta continues to appear in contemporary Balinese cultural performances. During the Galungan–Kuningan celebrations in September 2024, the Jatiluwih tourism area in Tabanan presented a costumed portrayal of the queen as part of a cultural program for visiting tourists. Organizers described the depiction as symbolizing feminine strength and spiritual authority, aligning with modern interpretations of her role in Balinese history and mythology. The performance was presented together with a portrayal of Naga Basuki and formed part of efforts to highlight local cultural heritage and spiritual concepts such as Rwa Bhineda and Tri Hita Karana.

== Notes ==
Preceded by Śri Wijaya Mahadewi	Balinese Monarchs with Udayana	Succeeded by Śri Ajñadewi
