= Queen Isyana =

Queen of Mataram
- Reign: 947 – ?
- Predecessor: Rakai Hino Dyah Siṇḍok
- Successor: Makutawangsa Wardhana
- Spouse: Lokapala
- Issue: Makutawangsa Wardhana
Regnal name
- Sri Ishanatunggawijaya
- House: Ishana
- Father: Rakai Halu Dyah Siṇḍok
- Mother: Rakryan Parameswari Dyah Kbi

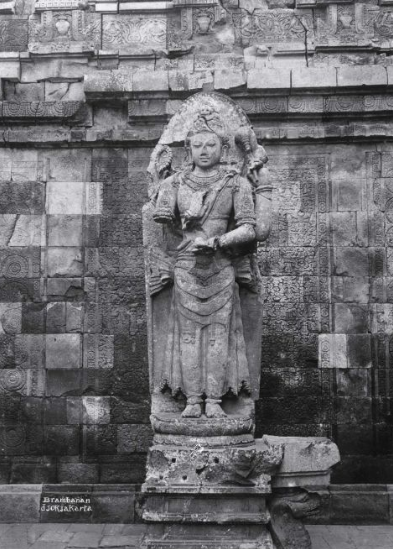
Statue of Queen Isyana

Isyana stylized as Sri Isyana Tunggawijaya was a queen regnant of Mataram kingdom, in East Java, that ruled since 947 CE. She co-reigned with her spouse, Sri Lokapala. The Isyana dynasty, established by her father, Mpu Sindok that ruled Java circa the 10th century CE, was named after her.

== Reign ==
Sri Isyana Tunggawijaya was the daughter of Mpu Sindok, a Javanese king that moved the capital of Mataram Kingdom from central Java to east Java. Nothing much is known from her reign, except that her husband was Sri Lokapala, a nobleman from neighboring Bali island.

Inscription dated from Sri Isyana-Sri Lokapala reign is Gedangan inscription dated 950, mentioned about a royal award of Bungur Lor and Asana villages for Buddhist sangha (priest community) in Bodhinimba. According to Pucangan inscription, the successor of royal couple Isyana-Lokapala was their son, Sri Makutawangsa Wardhana.

== Bibliography ==
- Marwati Poesponegoro & Nugroho Notosusanto. 1990. Sejarah Nasional Indonesia Jilid II. Jakarta: Balai Pustaka
- Slamet Muljana. 1979. Nagarakretagama dan Tafsir Sejarahnya. Jakarta: Bhratara

Preceded by Mpu Sindok	Monarch of Mataram Kingdom; 947 – 985?	Succeeded by Makutawangsa Wardhana
