= Sri Ugrasena =

Sang Ratu Sri Ugrasena was a Balinese king who is thought to have ruled between 837-864 Saka, or 915-942 CE. The capital of his kingdom was Singhamandawa. The king issued several inscriptions regarding various activities of his people, including giving royal endowment, tax regulation, religious ceremonies, and construction of public lodges and places of worship for pilgrims. His reign was approximately the same period as King Sindok's of the Isyana dynasty in East Java.

King Ugrasena is mentioned in at least 9 inscriptions, namely Sembiran A I inscription, Babahan I inscription, Srokadan A inscription, Pengotan A I inscription, Batunya A I inscription, Dausa A I and Dausa B I inscriptions, Serai A I inscription, and Goblek Pura Batur A inscription. All inscriptions are written in Old Balinese, begin with the words yumu pakatahu (let it be known), and end with the mention of the issuing body, namely the pangalapuan Singhamandawa (government advisory body in Singhamandawa).

King Ugrasena was buried in a temple called Air Madatu, according to the inscription issued by King Tabanendra Warmadewa who ruled afterward.

== See also ==
- Warmadewa dynasty
- List of monarchs of Bali

== Footnotes ==
Preceded by Sri Kesari Warmadewa	Balinese Monarchs; 915-942 CE	Succeeded by Tabanendra Warmadewa
