= Śri Wijaya Mahadewi =

10th-century Balinese queen regnant

Śri Wijaya Mahadewi of Bali (floruit 983), was a queen regnant of the Kingdom of Bali in 983-989.

She is attested from the Gobleg inscription, in which she granted her gave permission to the residents of Air Tabar to become the guardian of the Indrapura Temple located within the village of Air Tabar.

She did not use the sign of the Warmadewa dynasty, which has been the subject of a number of theories. It has been suggested that she came from Srivijaya, signifying how the power of Srivijaya had expanded to Bali. Another opinion is the she was the daughter of king Mpu Sindok.

Sri Wijaya Mahadewi died in 989 and left the throne to a king and a queen in co-regency.

Preceded by Janasadhu Warmadewa	Balinese Monarchs; 983-989	Succeeded by Mahendradatta and Udayana Warmadewa
