= Pujungan Inscription =

Historical inscription found in Indonesia

The Pujungan Inscription, also called Bronze Tongtong Inscription, is a short inscription written on a copper slit drum (Balinese: tongtong, kulkul), which was found in the village of Pujungan in Pupuan District, Tabanan Regency, Bali, Indonesia.

The inscription is thought to have been written during the reign of King Anak Wungsu in the 11th century. It is the first known inscription that mentions the name Sasak, referring to the indigenous people of Lombok.

Philologist J.G. de Casparis examined the inscription, which reads:

Sasakdhana prihhan srih jayannira

He translated this as:

"This object is a gift from (a) Sasak, (for) the commemoration of his victory."

Currently, the inscription is stored in Pujungan Temple.
