= Anak Wungsu =

King of Bali

King of Bali
- Reign: 1049 – 1077
- Predecessor: Marakata Pangkaja
- Successor: Walaprabhu
- House: Varmadeva
- Father: Udayana
- Mother: Mahendradatta

Anak Wungçu read as Anak Wungsu was the youngest brother of Airlangga, who succeeded him as the ruler of Bali and Java. He was part of the Wangsa (Dynasty) of Warmadewa (Warmadewa dynasty). During His reign, Anak Wungsu's territory stretches from north to south. The kingdom is in a state of security and peace.

== Reign ==
Anak Wungsu reigned from 1049 CE/AD or 970 Saka calendar to 1077 CE/AD or 998 Saka calendar.

Anak Wungsu had no descendants. His queen was known as Batari Mandul. Anak Wungsu's reign left 28 short inscriptions, some of which were found in Goa Gajah, Gunung Kawi (Tampak Siring), Gunung Panulisan and Sangsit.

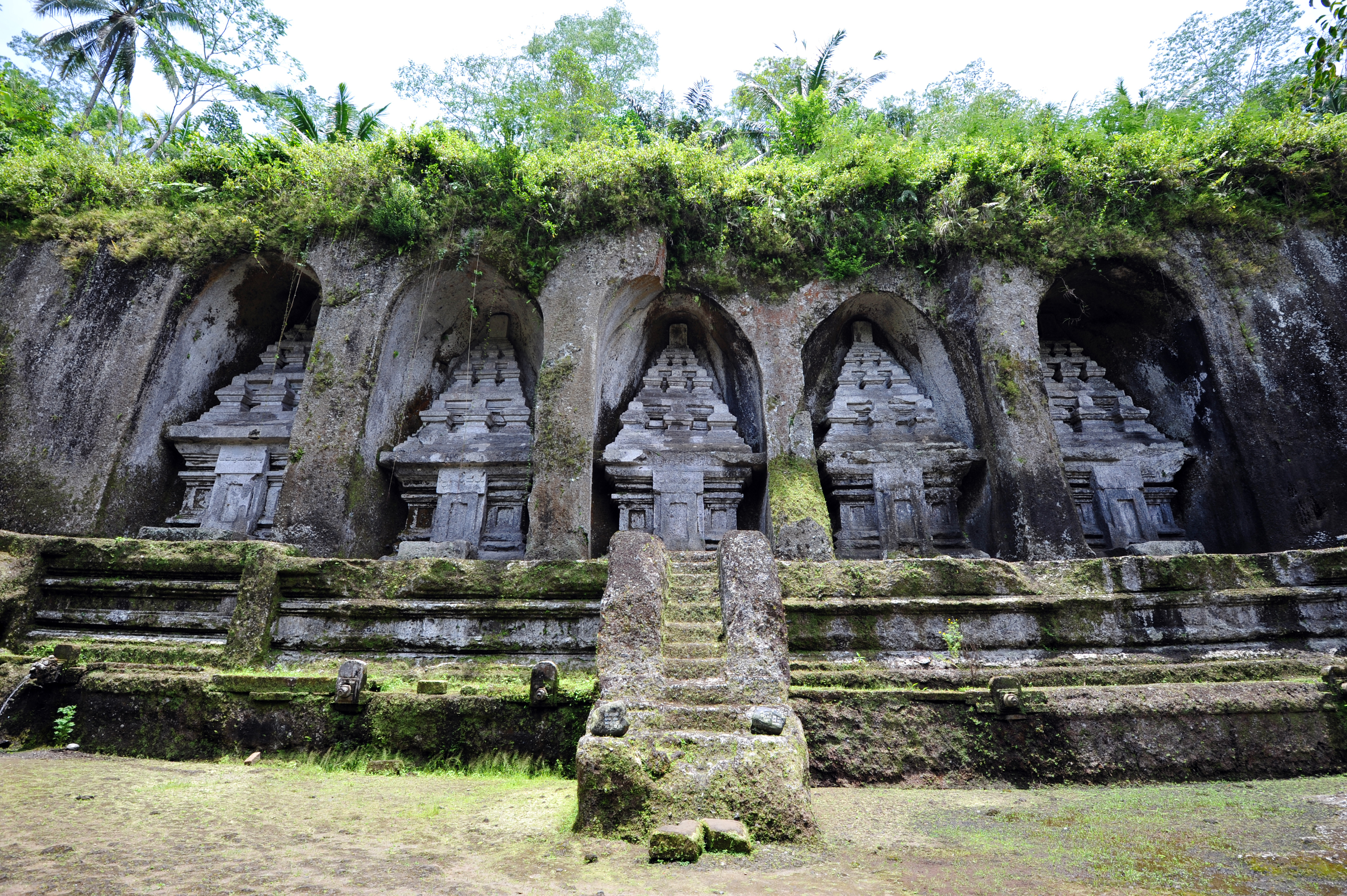
Gunung Kawi Temple Complex.

== See also ==
- History of Bali
- Pujungan Inscription
- List of monarchs of Bali

Preceded by Airlangga	Balinese Monarchs	Succeeded by Śri Maharaja Walaprabhu
