= Tabanendra Warmadewa =

Sang Ratu Aji Tabanendra Warmadewa was a king from the Warmadewa dynasty, who is thought to have ruled in Bali (now in Indonesia) between 877-889 Saka (955-967 CE). His name is mentioned on three inscriptions in Manik Liu village, dated the 1st of Srawana month in the year of 877 Saka; and in another inscription in Kintamani village, dated the 6th of Bhadrapada month, Suklapaksa in the year of 889 Saka.

King Tabanendra Warmadewa was mentioned of having a queen named Ratu Sri Subhadrika Dharmadewi. He was also mention for giving tax exemptions to several villages, and allowing some priests to build a retreat at Air Madatu, which is also a burial place for the previous king (Sri Ugrasena).

== See also ==
- Warmadewa dynasty
- List of monarchs of Bali

Preceded by Sri Ugrasena	Balinese Monarchs; 955-967 CE	Succeeded by Indrajayasingha Warmadewa
