= Janasadhu Warmadewa =

Sang Ratu Sri Janasadhu Warmadewa was a king of the Warmadewa dynasty, who ruled Bali around the end of the 10th century CE. Based on various inscriptions, he was the fifth king of the dynasty. King Janasadhu's name has been found in only one inscription, namely the Sembiran inscription (No. 209 Sembiran A II), which was dated to 897 Saka (975 CE).

It is narrated in the Sembiran A II inscription that the king had ordered the villagers of Julah and the surrounding villages (Indrapura, Buwun Dalam, and Hiliran) to help each other in repairing place of worship (Pura Meru, also called Dharmakuta hermitage), and armed themselves and protect each other against war and robbery. Thus it can be known that the villages, of the indigenous Balinese (Bali Aga), had long been established in the area near the coast of north Bali; and since at least the 10th century had been ordered by their rulers to guard the area of worship and trading ports of the area, in the interest of the state.

It is not known exactly how long King Janasadhu reigned; but in the Gobleg inscription which is dated to 905 Saka (983 CE) the name of a new ruler, Queen Sri Wijaya Mahadewi, is mentioned. The queen's inscription also begins with the word punah ('extinct'), as in the inscription of King Janasadhu. However, the queen was the first ruler in Bali to use the title Sri Maharaja ('great king'), while the previous rulers of the Warmadewa dynasty up to King Janasadhu use the title Sang Ratu ('king', a local title).

== See also ==
- Warmadewa dynasty
- List of monarchs of Bali

| Preceded by Indrajayasingha Warmadewa | Balinese Monarchs; 975 CE | Succeeded by Śri Wijaya Mahadewi |
