= Marakata Pangkaja =

Balinese king

- Dharmawangsa Wardhana Marakatapangkaja

King of Bali
- Reign: 1022 – 1049
- Predecessor: Udayana
- Successor: Anak Wungçu
Regnal name
- Çri Dharmawangsa Wardhana Marakata Pangkajastanottunggadeva
- House: Varmadeva
- Father: Udayana
- Mother: Mahendradatta
- Religion: Hinduism

Marakata Pangkaja was a Balinese king from the Warmadewa dynasty. He was the son of King Udayana and Queen Mahendradatta, a Javanese princess. His royal title was Çri Dharmawangsa Wardhana Marakata Pangkajastanottunggadewa. He ascended to the throne in 1022 CE, and probably reigned until 1049 CE. His reign coincided with the reign of his elder brother, King Airlangga, who ruled the Mataram kingdom in Java. After he died, the next king who ruled Bali was his younger brother, King Anak Wungsu.

In several inscriptions, King Marakata is depicted as a ruler who was like Vishnu, who often helps his suffering people. The Bwahan B inscription stated that the king granted the request of the Bwahan village elders to buy a portion of the royal hunting ground, because they lacked sufficient land for herding and collecting firewood. His name is mentioned in at least 10 inscriptions found on the island of Bali.

== See also ==
- Mahendradatta
- Udayana Warmadewa
- Warmadewa dynasty

Preceded by Sri Ajnadewi	Balinese Monarchs; 1022-1049	Succeeded by Airlangga
