= Tampaksiring =

Town in Bali, Indonesia

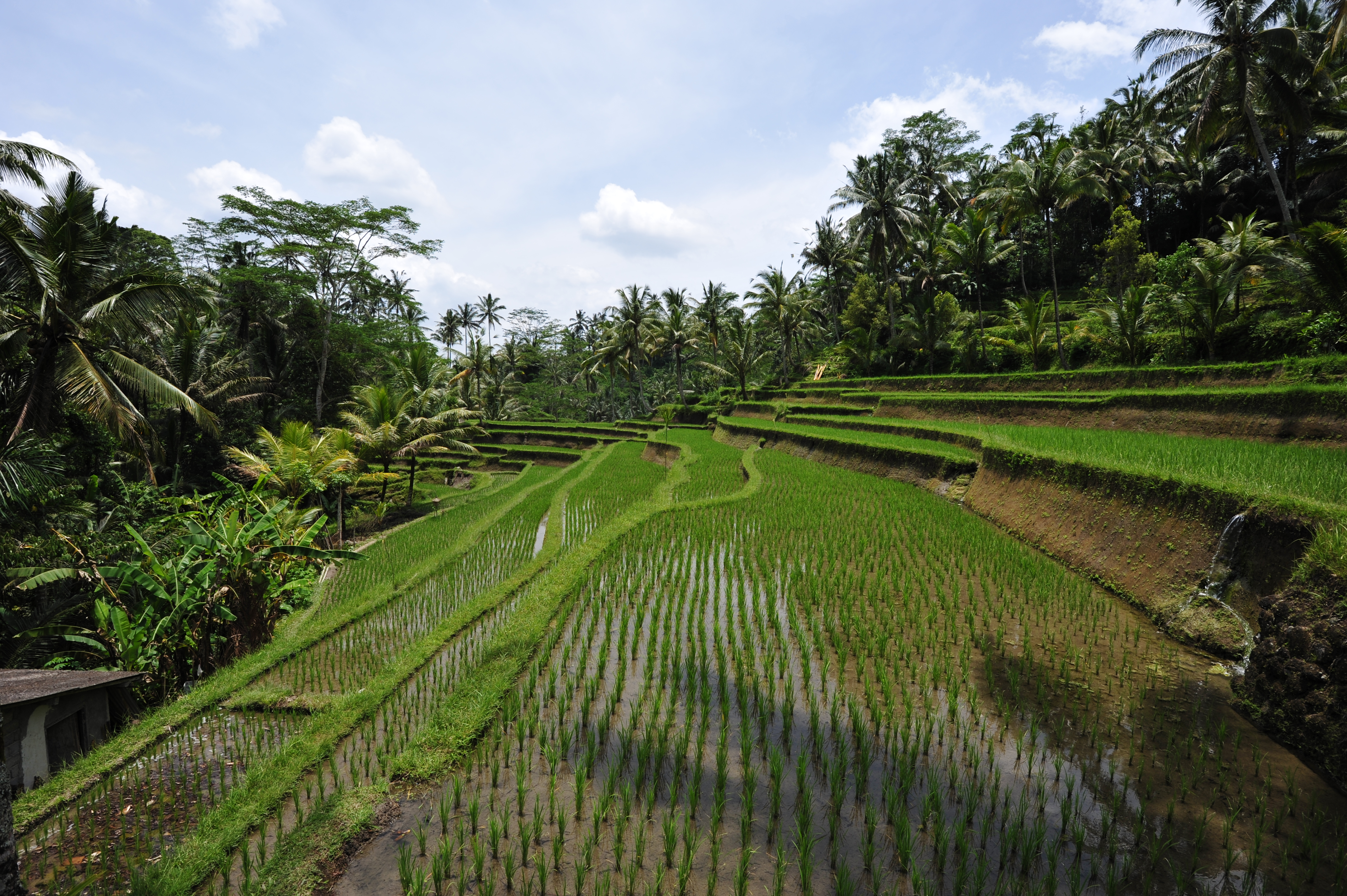
- Rice fields (sawah) at the entrance to Gunung Kawi Temple

- Location in Bali
- Coordinates: 8°25′S 115°18′E
- Country: Indonesia
- Province: Bali

Area
  - Total: 16.46 sq mi (42.63 km^{2})

Population (2019)
  - Total: 48,740
  - Density: 2,961/sq mi (1,143/km^{2})

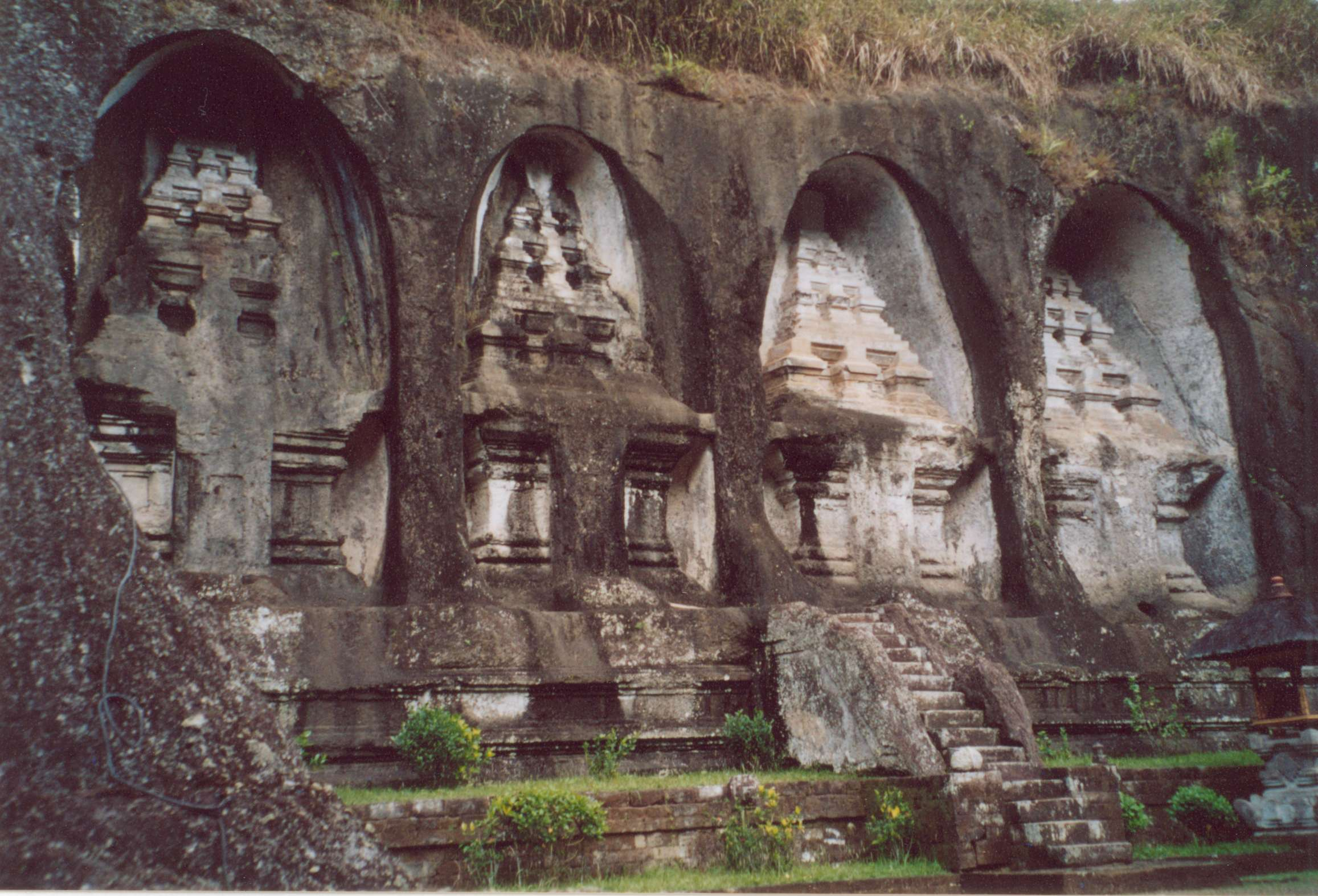
Gunung Kawi

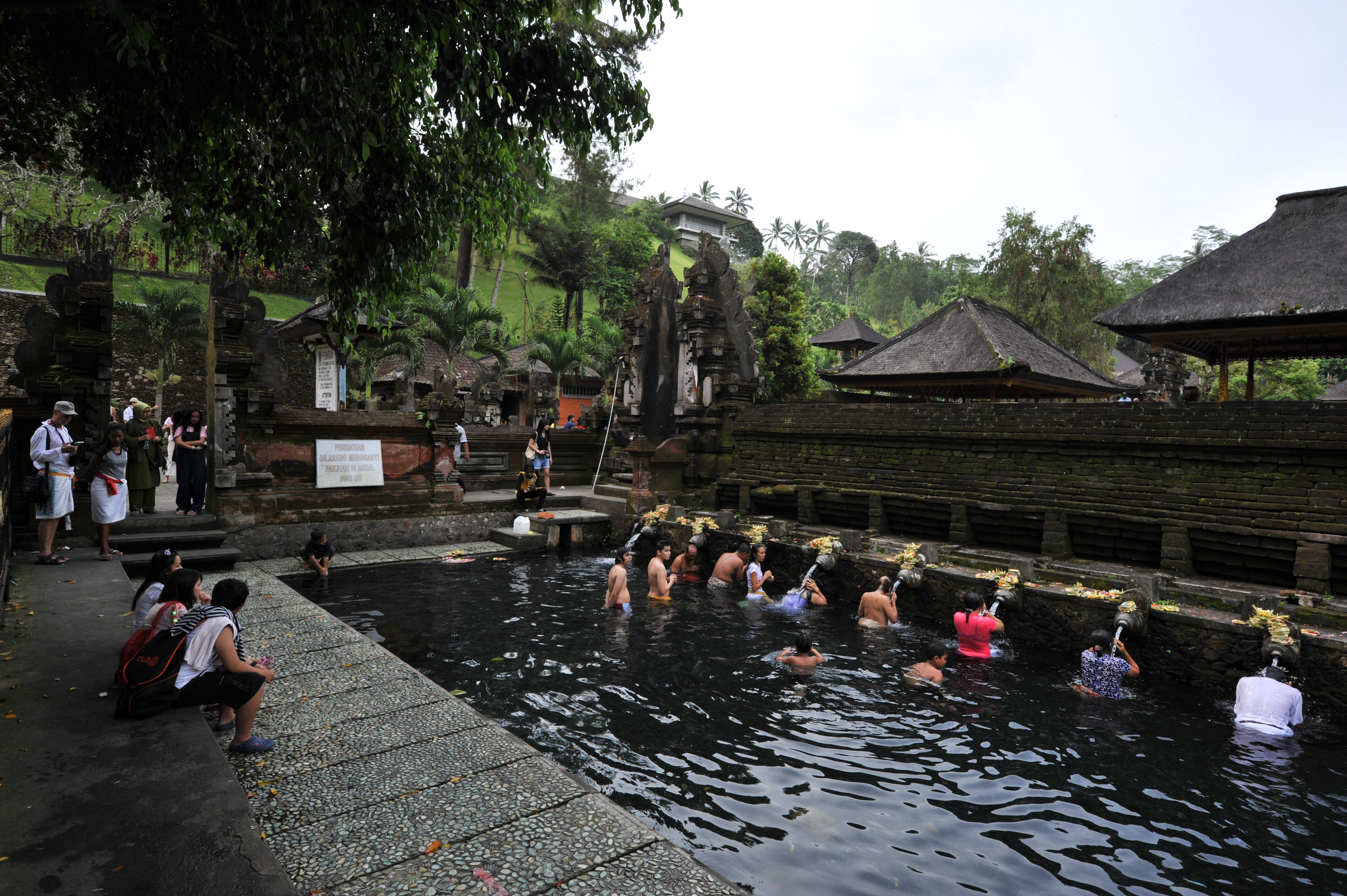
Tirta Empul Temple

Tampaksiring is a town in central Bali, Gianyar Regency, Indonesia. As of the 2010 census, the area was 42.63 km^{2} and the population was 45,818; the latest official estimate (as at mid 2019) is 48,740. It is the home to the Gunung Kawi Temple and archaeological site and the Senang Hati Foundation.

The word "Tampak" in Balinese means foot, while "Siring" means Oblique. According to the legend the slope of the mountain where the town stands today, was created by footstep of a king named Mayadenawa. Tampaksiring was also one of the major kingdom during Bali's pre-colonial period. The town is home to Tirta Empul Temple

Villages around Tampaksiring are: Manukaya, Pejeng, Pejeng Kaja, Pejeng Kangin, Pejeng Kawan, Pejeng Kelod, Sanding, and Tampaksiring.

== Presidential Palace ==
Tampaksiring is also location of Istana Tampaksiring, one of the six presidential palaces in Indonesia. The Palace was built between 1957 and 1960 at the initiation of President Sukarno. The buildings of the complex are scattered around on an area covering 19 hectares. The main palace building are built on a higher ground overlooking Tampaksiring Tirta Empul Temple and Mount Agung.
