= Leyak =

Mythological creatures

Leyak ᬮᬾᬬᬓ᭄
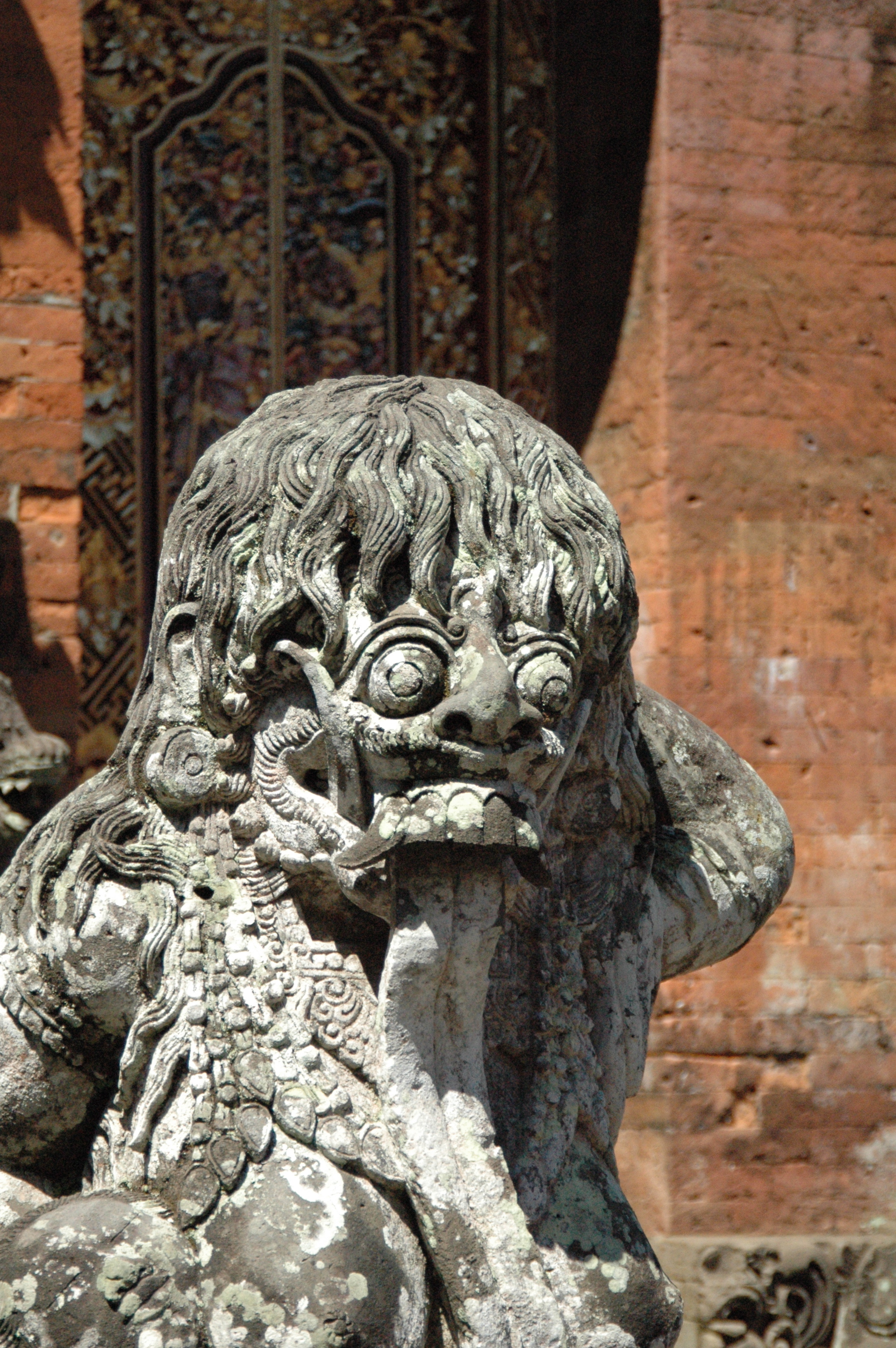
- A statue of Rangda, the queen of Leyak

Creature information
- Grouping: Legendary creature
- Sub grouping: Undead
- Similar entities: Krasue, Penanggalan
- Folklore: Balinese mythology

Origin
- Country: Indonesia
- Region: Bali

The Leyak (Balinese: ᬮᬾᬬᬓ᭄; pronounced [le.ak]) is a mythological figure in the folklore of Bali, in the form of a flying head with entrails (heart, lung, liver, etc.) still attached. Leyak are said to fly trying to find a pregnant woman in order to suck her baby's blood or a newborn child.

== Description ==
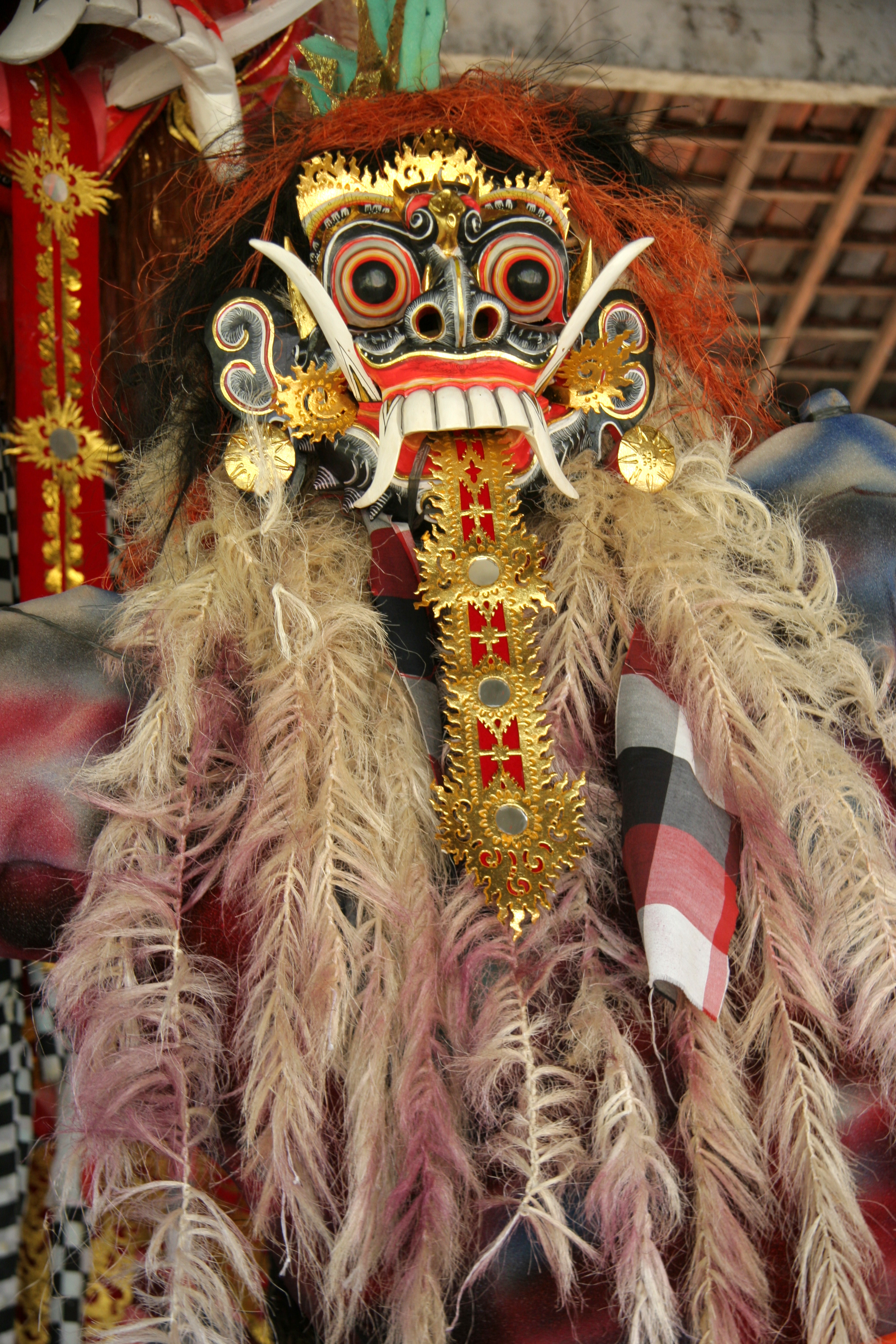
A wooden mask depicting the head of Rangda, the queen of Leyak.

Leyak are humans who are practicing black magic and have cannibalistic behavior. Their mistress is the "queen of Leyak", a widow-witch named Rangda, who plays a prominent role in public rituals. Her mask is kept in the village death temple, and during her temple festivals, she is paraded. Besides Leyaks, demons are said to be the followers of Rangda.

Leyak are said to haunt graveyards, feed on corpses, have the power to change themselves into animals, such as pigs, and fly. In normal Leyak form, they are said to have an unusually long tongue and large fangs. In daylight, they appear as an ordinary human, but at night, their head and entrails break loose from their body and fly. Leyak statues (a head with a very long tongue and sharp fangs) are sometimes hung on a wall for house decoration.

In practice, Balinese people sometimes attribute certain illnesses or deaths to Leyak. A balian (Balinese traditional healer) will conduct a séance to identify with witchcraft who is responsible for the death. During the séance, the spirit of the dead will directly or indirectly point to their attacker. However, vengeance by the victim's relatives or family is usually counseled against, and people are advised to leave any action to the spirits themselves. Hence, the suspicions and fears of the family and relatives are confirmed, but revenge upon the witch is discouraged by the healers.

== See also ==
- Flying Head – a spirit in Iroquois and Wyandot mythology
- Krasue – a similar spirit in Southeast Asian folklore
- Manananggal – a mythical creature in Philippine folklore
- Penanggalan – a similar entity in Malay ghost myths
- In Shin Megami Tensei (video game) this creature repels physical damage.
