= Udayana Warmadewa =

Udayana Warmadewa Udayana the Great
- Sang Raja Maruhani Sri Dharmodayana Warmadewa

King of Bali
- Reign: late 10th century
- Predecessor: Śri Wijaya Mahadewi
- Successor: Śri Ajñadewi
- Co-ruler: Mahendradatta
- Spouse: Mahendradatta
- Issue: Airlangga; Marakata Pangkaja; Anak Wungçu
- House: Warmadewa
- Religion: Hinduism

Udayana Warmadewa, also Udayana the Great or Dharmmodayana Warmadewa, was a king of the island of Bali in the 10th century. He belongs to the Warmadewa dynasty. He was married to the Javanese queen Mahendradatta, also known as Gunapriyadharmapatni. Their son was the famous Airlangga, who replaced the overthrown emperor of Java Dharmawangsa, and ruled in both Java and his original home of Bali. Mahendradatta and Udayana co-ruled Bali, issuing inscriptions in both their names.

== Legacy ==
Udayana is known as one of the earliest historical figures of ancient Bali. His identification as the father of the famous Airlangga, the hero-king of Java, has led him to be a prominent figure in Balinese history on par with ancient Java. As a result, his name is associated with Balinese past greatness. In 1962 the Udayana University (Indonesian: Universitas Udayana), a public university was established in Denpasar, Bali, Indonesia. The university's name was derived from this king. Also, the Indonesian Army named their Bali-based Military Command Region (Kodam), in his honor, the Kodam IX/Udayana.

His son Airlangga, became the King of Kahuripan. But his sons Anak Wungsu and Marakata Pangkaja became Kings of Bali (Kingdom of Bedahulu).

== Notes ==
Preceded by Śri Wijaya Mahadewi	Balinese Monarchs with Mahendradatta	Succeeded by Śri Ajñadewi
