= Warmadewa dynasty =

Balinese regnal dynasty

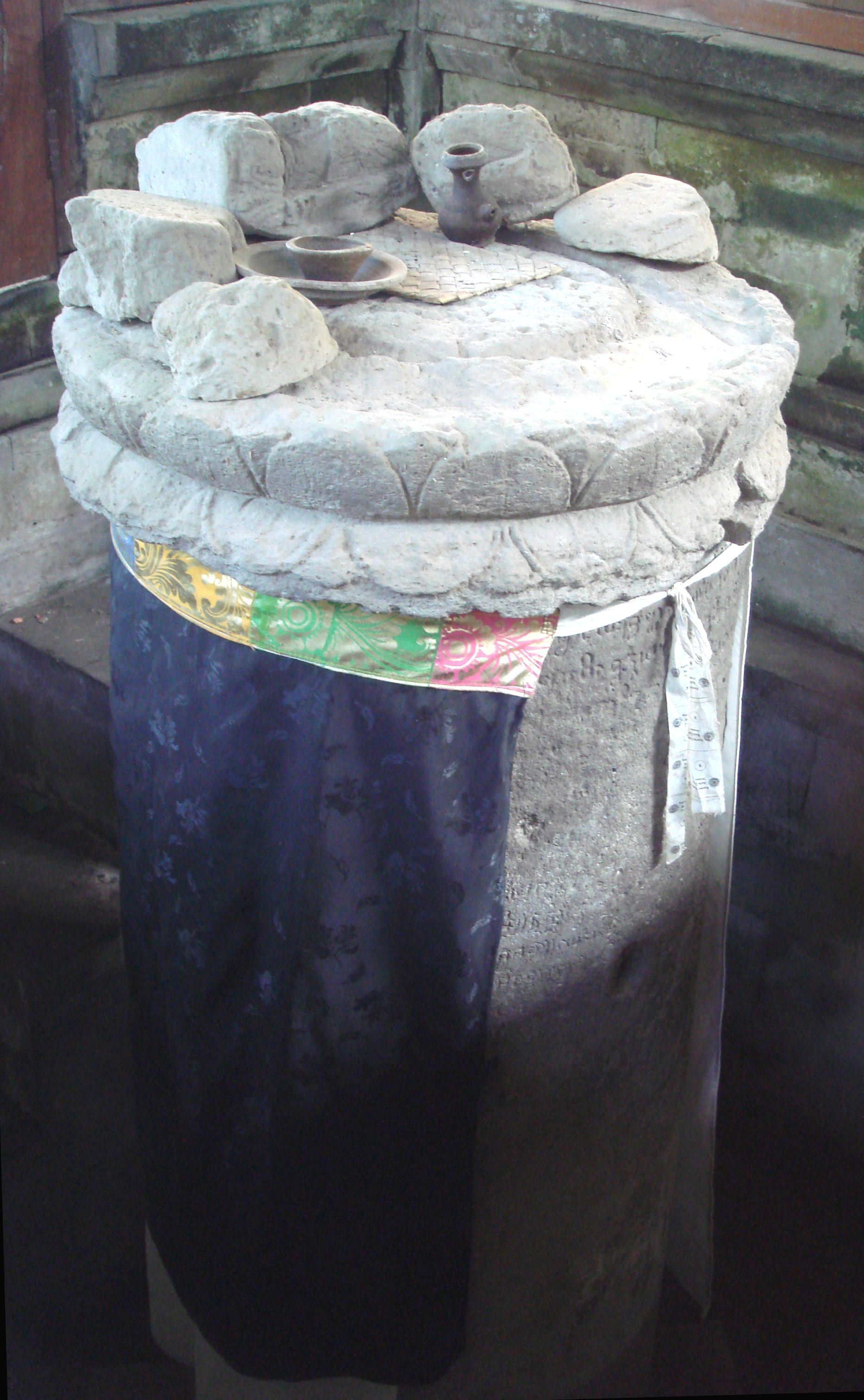
The Belanjong pillar in Sanur issued in 914 CE by Sri Kesari Warmadewa, the founder of the Warmadewa dynasty. Sanur, Bali.

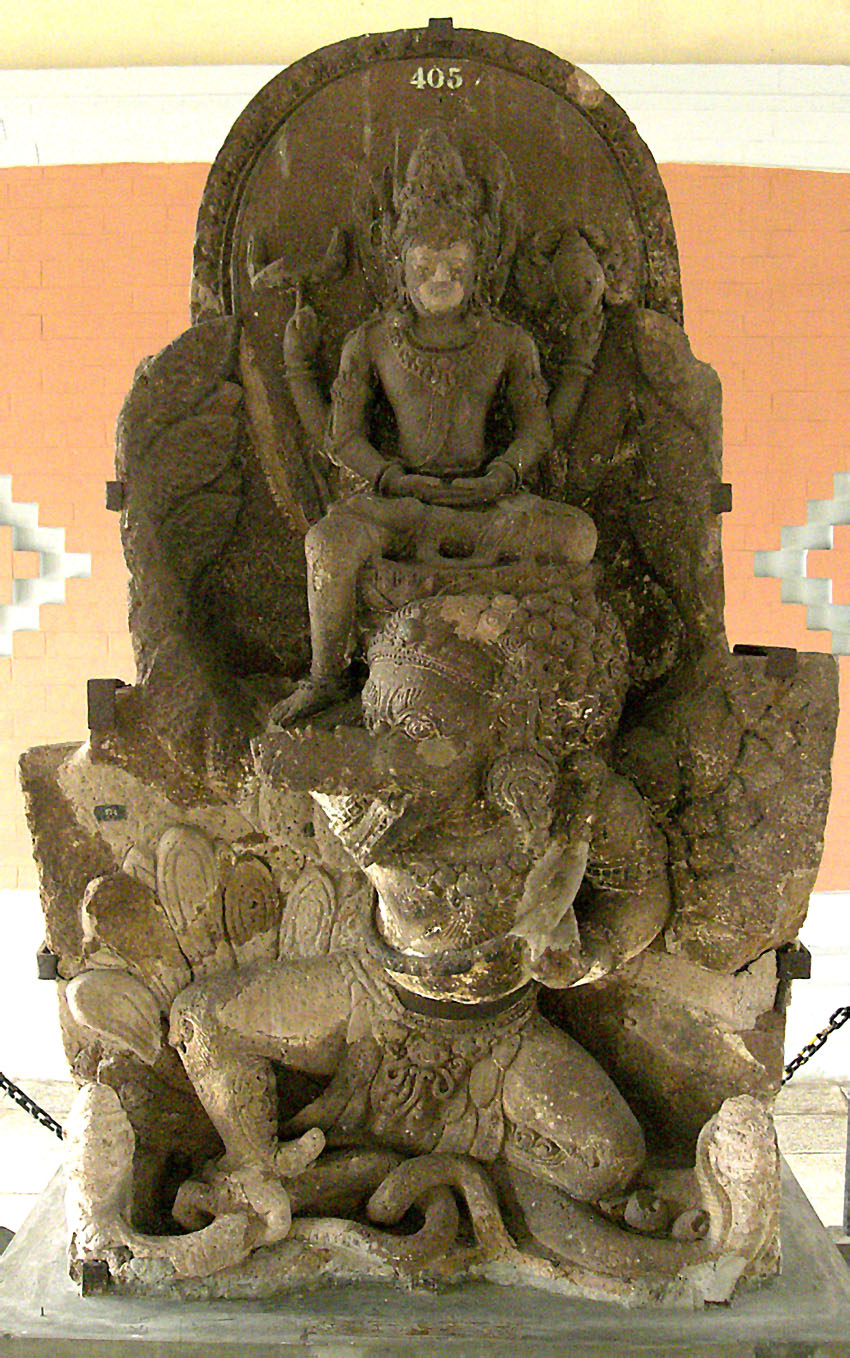
The deified statue of King Airlangga depicted as Vishnu mounting Garuda, found in Belahan, collection of Trowulan Museum, East Java.

The Warmadewa dynasty, also Varmadeva dynasty, was a regnal dynasty on the island of Bali.

== History ==
There is little explicit information about how the various monarchs called Warmadewa were related to each other. The term "dynasty", in this context, therefore refers generally to a group of monarchs who share a common element in their titles, rather than a hereditary lineage.

It is believed that the dynasty was founded by Sri Kesari Warmadewa in the 10th century. However, the only evidence for this claim is that Sri Kesari is the first Balinese king to use the name Warmadewa, on the Belanjong pillar (B.13). There is no explicit evidence that Sri Kesari founded the Warmadewa dynasty, only that he is the earliest known member of it. Only the part Śri Kesarī Warma- of this name is visible on the stone, but it is conjectured that the final element -dewa was written there but is now illegible.

The dynasty prospered for several generations. The final ruler to use the title Warmadewa was the famous king Udayana Warmadewa, in the Abang Pura Batur A inscription dated 6 April 1011. Udayana Warmadewa is believed by many historians to be the father of Airlangga, the famous king of Java in the 1020s to 1040s, based on Airlangga's biography given in the Pucangan inscription (1041).

=== Kings of the Warmadewa dynasty ===
- Sri Kesari Warmadewa (c. 914)
- Sang Ratu Ugrasena
- Tabanendra Warmadewa
- Indrajayasingha Warmadewa (c. 962)
- Janasadhu Warmadewa (c. 975)
- Udayana Warmadewa
- Airlangga (991-1049)
- Marakata Pangkaja
- Anak Wungsu (1049-)

== See also ==
- Bali Kingdom
- History of Bali
- List of monarchs of Bali
