= Airlangga =

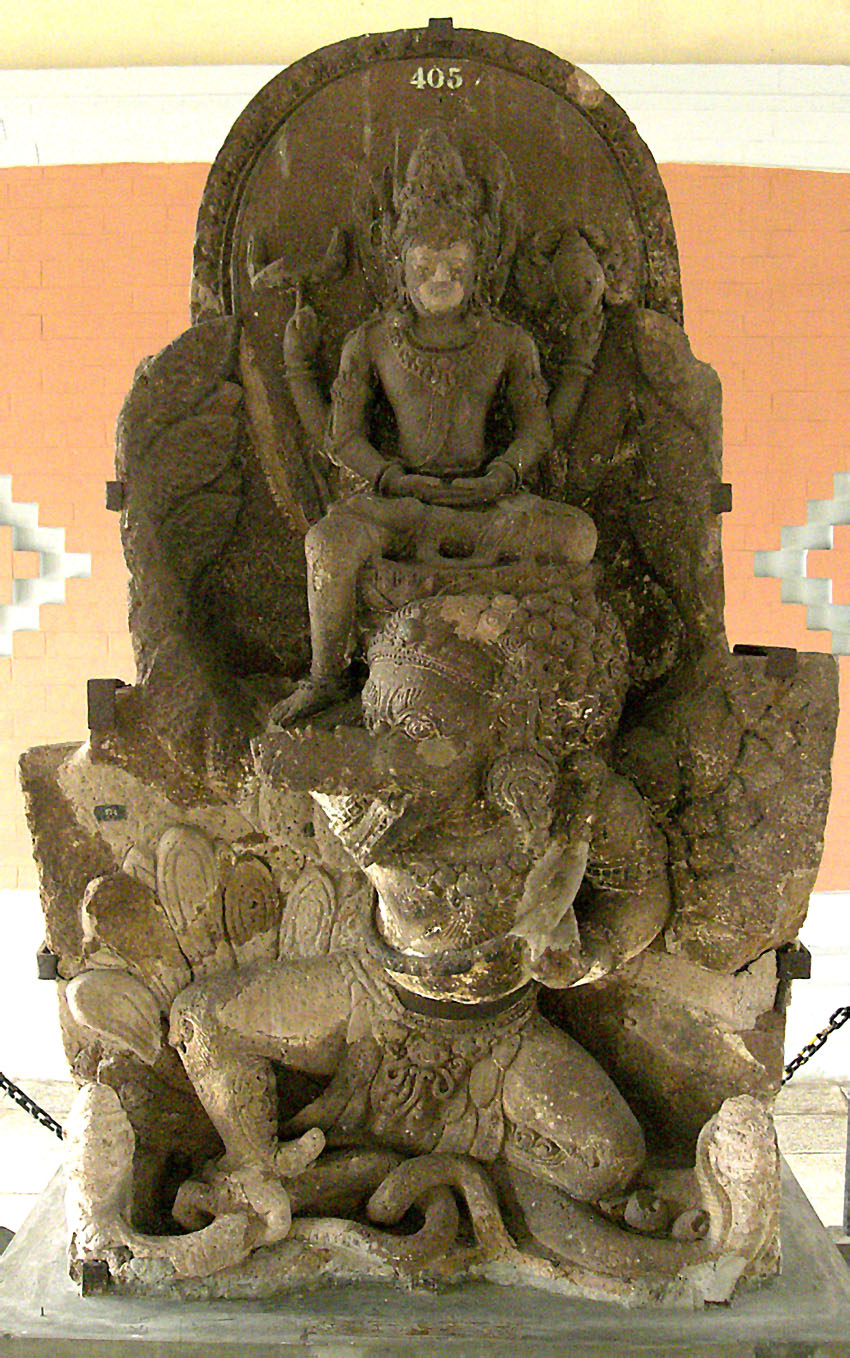
- The deified statue of King Airlangga depicted as Vishnu mounting Garuda, found in Belahan, collection of Trowulan Museum, East Java.

King of Kahuripan
- Reign: ? – 1042
- Born: c. 1002; Kingdom of Bali
- Died: 1049 (aged 46–47); Kingdom of Kahuripan
- Issue: Samarawijaya, King of Daha (capital of Kediri Kingdom); Mapanji Garasakan, King of Janggala
Regnal name
- Rakai Halu Sri Lokeswara Dharmawangsa Airlangga Anantawikramattonggadewa
- House: Ishana
- Father: Udayana Warmadewa
- Mother: Mahendradatta
- Religion: Vaishnavism

Airlangga (also spelled Erlangga), regnal name Rakai Halu Sri Lokeswara Dharmawangsa Airlangga Anantawikramottunggadewa (born 1002 in Bali, Indonesia – died 1049 in Java), was the only king of the Kingdom of Kahuripan.

The Kingdom was built from the territory of the Kingdom of Mataram after Mataram was sacked by King Wurawari of Lwaram. He gradually gained support, won back the kingdom once ruled by his uncle, and went on to become one of Java's most notable kings. Airlangga means "jumping water", thus his name means "he who crossed the water", described his life story; born in the court of Bali and during his youth crossed the Bali Strait to stay in Java and later ruled the kingdom in East Java. He belongs to both Ishana and Warmadewa lineages.

== Early life ==
Airlangga was born from a dynastic marriage between Ishana of Java and Warmadewa of Bali. His mother, queen Mahendradatta, was a princess of the Ishana dynasty, the sister of King Dharmawangsa of Mataram, while his father, King Udayana Warmadewa of Bali, was a king of the Balinese Warmadewa Dynasty. Bali in the 11th century probably was an ally or vassal of Java, the marriage of Airlangga's parents was probably meant as a political means to seal Bali as part of Mataram's realm. Airlangga has two younger brothers, Marakata (who later became king of Bali after the death of their father) and Anak Wungçu (who ascended to Balinese throne after the death of Marakata). Later, in various inscriptions created by Airlangga, he claimed to be the descendant of Mpu Sindok of the Ishana dynasty.

However, there is speculation suggesting that Airlangga was not the biological son of King Udayana, Mahendradatta probably conceived Airlangga from her previous union to an unknown man, and after her separation (either because of death or divorce) Mahendradatta was betrothed to the Balinese king, thus she took the baby Airlangga to Bali. Historical sources seem to be silenced on Mahendradatta's suspected earlier marriage, that it might be a scandal or not even taken place. This suspicion was because although Airlangga was the eldest son of Mahendradatta, he was not chosen as the crown prince of Bali, his younger brother Marakata and later Anak Wungçu rose to the Balinese throne instead. Moreover, Mahendradatta sent Airlangga back to Java during his teenage years. Mahendradatta was known to be promoting the cult of Durga in Bali, and later associated with the Balinese legend of the evil witch Rangda, which translates to "widow".

Airlangga was born and grew up in Bali, groomed by his mother, queen Mahendradatta, to be a proper future ruler. In his teenage years, his mother sent him back to her parents' home in Java to be educated further in Watugaluh court, Mataram, East Java, under the patronage of his uncle, King Dharmawangsa. Airlangga was betrothed to his cousin, one of Dharmawangsa's daughters, thus arranged marriage was in place. At that time, Mataram had become a powerful kingdom, allied or probably subjugated Bali, and had established a colony in West Kalimantan. Dharmawangsa aspired to ascend Mataram as a regional power by challenging the Srivijaya Empire's domination. In 990 he launched a naval invasion against Srivijaya and unsuccessfully tried to capture Palembang. Srivijaya resiliently succeeds in repelling Javanese Mataram invaders.

The Calcutta Stone inscription (dated from 1041 CE), describes a terrible calamity that befell the East Javanese kingdom of Ishana dynasty in the early years of the 11th century. In 1006, a rebellion incited by a vassal king Wurawari from Lwaram destroyed the capital of Watugaluh. The reigning king, Dharmawangsa, successor to Sri Makutawangsawardhana, was murdered along with his entire family and many of his subjects. Only the young Airlangga, who was aged about 16 at the time, managed to escape unharmed. According to tradition the calamity, dubbed as Pralaya (destruction) of Mataram, took place during Airlangga's wedding ceremony in Dharmawangsa palace.

Today historians strongly suggest that the invasion was a Srivijayan retaliation against Mataram for the attacks upon the empire. After the failed Dharmawangsa's naval campaign against Palembang back in 990, Sri Culamanivarmadeva the Maharaja of Srivijaya saw Javanese Mataram as a dangerous threat, thus arranged a stratagem to destroy Mataram by inciting a revolt. King Wurawari of Lwaram was probably an ally of Srivijaya in Java and also the vassal of Mataram. With Srivijaya's assistance, Wurawari managed to sack and burn Watugaluh Palace during Mataram's most unexpected time; the Airlangga's royal wedding. Airlangga, accompanied by his guard Narottama, escaped westward into the jungle and retreated as a hermit in Vanagiri (today Wonogiri, Central Java).

== Struggle and establishment of Kahuripan Kingdom ==
In 1019, after several years in self-imposed exile in a Mount Vanagiri hermitage, Airlangga rallied support from officials and regents that are loyal to the former Ishana dynasty and began to unite the areas that had formerly been ruled by the Mataram kingdom, which had disintegrated after Dharmawangsa's death. He consolidated his authority, established a new kingdom, and made peace with Srivijaya. The new kingdom was called the Kingdom of Kahuripan, the location of his capital, and stretched from Pasuruan in the east to Madiun in the west. In 1025, Airlangga increased the power and influence of Kahuripan as the Srivijaya Empire began to decline. Airlangga was known for his religious tolerance and was a patron of both the Hindu and Buddhist religions.

In 1035 Airlangga constructed a Buddhist monastery named Srivijayasrama dedicated to his queen consort Dharmaprasadottungadewi. The monastery bearing the name of Srivijaya suggests that his queen consort was probably a Srivijayan princess, a close relative, probably the daughter, of the Srivijayan king Sangramavijayattungavarman. She had taken refuge in East Java after her father was taken prisoner and her kingdom was raided through series of Tamil Chola raids. The king seems to be sympathetic to the poor fate of the Srivijayan princess, having lost her family and her kingdom, and probably genuinely fell in love and devoted to her, thus promoting her as prameswari (the queen consort). Airlangga went further, naming his daughter from queen Dharmaprasadottungadewi as heiress, the future queen regnant of Kahuripan. The decline of Srivijaya due to the Chola invasion gave Airlangga opportunity to consolidate his kingdom without foreign interference. Later, he extended his kingdom to Central Java and Bali. The north coast of Java, particularly Surabaya and Tuban, for the first time became important centres of trade.

Although there are few surviving archaeological remains dating from his time, Airlangga is known to have been a keen patron of the arts, notably literature. In 1035, the court poet Mpu Kanwa composed the Kakawin Arjunawiwaha, which was adapted from the Mahabharata epic. This text told the story of Arjuna, an incarnation of Indra, but was also an allegory for Airlangga's own life. The tale of Airlangga's life was illustrated in the Belahan Temple on the flanks of Mount Penanggungan, where he was portrayed in stone as Vishnu on Garuda.

In 1037 the capital was moved from Watan Mas to Kahuripan, the king also reported to bestow titles for his loyal followers, such as Narottama promoted as Rakryan Kanuruhan (prime minister) and Niti as Rakryan Kuningan. According to the Kelagen inscription (dated 1037 CE), Airlangga also took a keen interest in agriculture development. He embarked on a grand irrigation project by constructing the Wringin Sapta dam (located in today's Jombang Regency). By building a dam on the Brantas River, he provided irrigation to surrounding paddy fields and maintained a hydraulic system in the area.

== Abdication and death ==
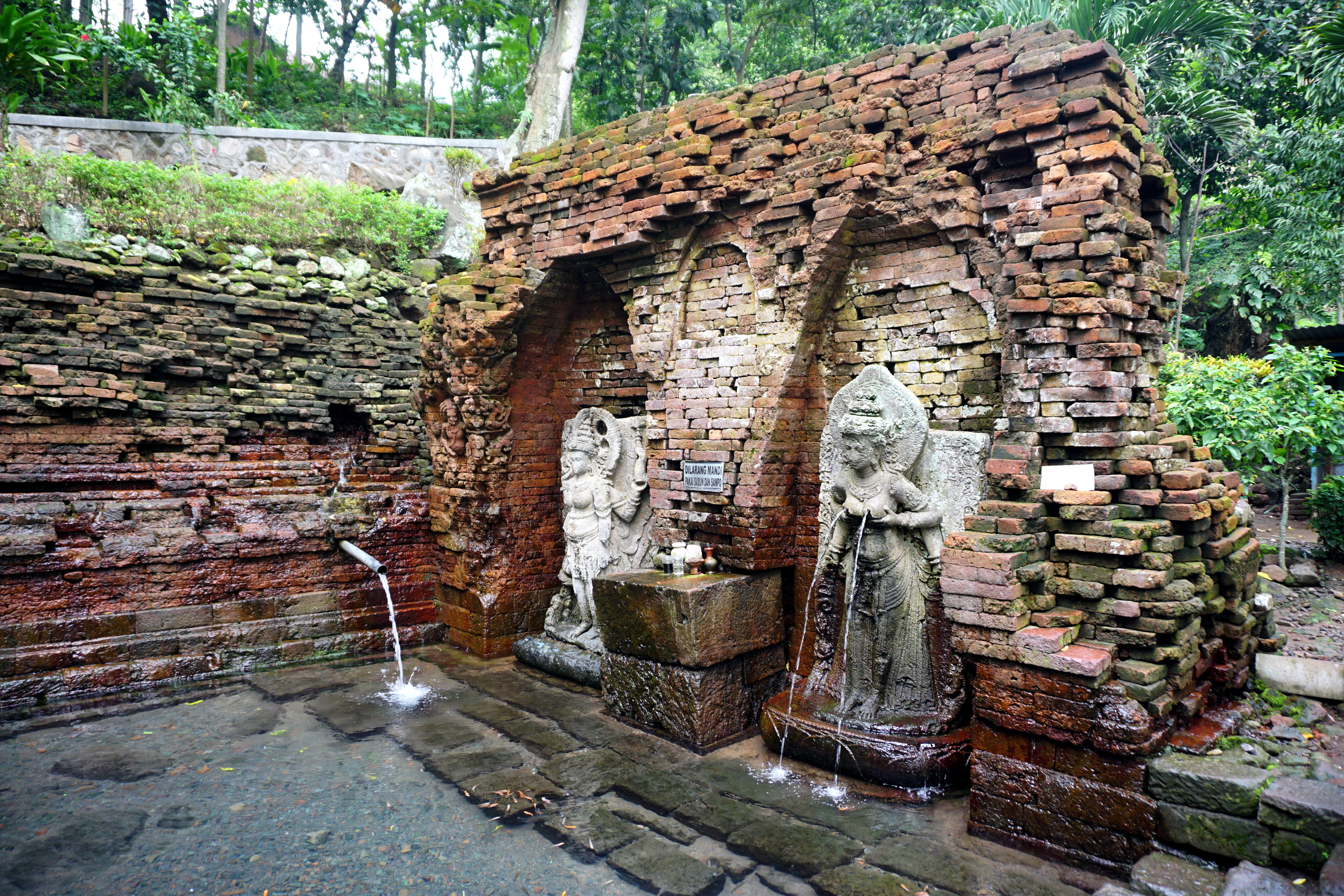
The fountain of Belahan temple, Mount Penanggungan.

Towards the end of his life, Airlangga was faced with the problem of succession. His heiress, the crown princess Sangramawijaya, decided to become a Bhikkuni Buddhist hermit rather than succeed Airlangga as queen regnant. Sangramawijaya is the daughter of the queen consort Dharmaprasadottunggadewi. The story of a crown princess who renounced the throne to become a hermit is linked with the popular legend of Dewi Kilisuci who resides in the Selomangleng Cave beneath Mount Klothok, 5 kilometers to the west of the city of Kediri. Because the crown princess Sangramawijaya had renounced the throne, two of her younger half-brothers were next in line of succession. Both are equally rightful as the heirs and both contesting the throne.

In 1045, Airlangga divided Kahuripan into two kingdoms which were inherited by his two sons; Janggala and Kediri. Airlangga himself abdicated the throne in 1045 and returned to the hermit life by assuming a new name as Resi Aji Paduka Mpungku Sang Pinaka Catraning Bhuwana, bestowed by Mpu Bharada, a famous hermit. The reasons behind the partition of a kingdom that Airlangga himself painstakingly united during his younger years remain a puzzle for historians. Some suggested that it was meant to avoid civil war since both of Airlangga's sons were equally rightful to the throne. A local legend, mixed with fantastic fiction, mentioned the partition of the kingdom. It was said that Mpu Bharada was the one who conducted the partition; with his extraordinary skill, he flew and poured water from a jar that the water traces magically transformed into a river marking the boundary of the two new kingdoms. Accidentally he stuck on a kamal (tamarind) tree, feeling upset he cursed the kamal tree to be forever short, thus becoming the name of the village where this event took place; kamal pandak ("the short tamarind tree").

Airlangga died in 1049, and his ashes were probably scattered in Belahan tirtha (sacred bathing pool), on the eastern slopes of Mount Penanggungan, wherein one of the waterspout statues he was portrayed as Vishnu riding Garuda, flanked by statues of two goddesses; Shri and Lakshmi portrayed the two queen consorts of Airlangga.

After the death of Airlangga, a civil war broke out between Janggala and Kediri (aka Panjalu) that continued until 1052. In that year King Mapanji Alanjung Ahyes of Panjalu succeed in conquering Janggala. However, in 1059 another king named Samarotsaha ascended the throne of Janggala, he was the son-in-law of Airlangga.

== Notes ==
Preceded by Marakata Pangkaja	Balinese Monarchs	Succeeded by Anak Wungsu
