= Ishana dynasty =

Hindu dynasty of Java

The Ishana dynasty, rulers of the Kingdom of Mataram, was a dynasty of the Hindu Mataram kingdom on the island of Java. Ishana (Sanskrit: ईशान, IAST: Īśāna, Indonesian: Isyana) refers to a Hindu god who is often considered to be one of the forms of the Hindu destroyer god Shiva.

It followed the Sanjaya dynasty and was established by Mpu Sindok, who moved the capital of the Mataram Kingdom from Central Java to East Java around the year 929. Coedes states, "Sindok, under his reign name Sri Isyana Vikramadharmatungadeva, was always considered the founder of Javanese power in the east of the island." Mpu Sindok's daughter and successor was Isanatungavijaya, who in turn was succeeded by her son Makutavamsavardhana, followed by Dharmawangsa.

Pucangan inscription describes the reign of the Isyana dynasty that came to an end when the revolt against a vassal King Wurawari of Lwaram attacked and destroyed the capital in 1016.

Eventually, the ruler Airlangga restored and reunited the kingdom as Kahuripan. Airlangga's heirs ruled the Kingdom of Kediri and are thought to be the continuation of the Isyana dynasty.

In Trehgam village, a mosque and a temple are in the same compound and share a natural spring for generations. The stone flooring of the spring is said to have been built by the Ishanas of the Ishana dynasty, according to locals.

== See also ==
- Sanjaya dynasty
- Kingdom of Mataram
- List of monarchs of Java
