= Bali Kingdom =

Series of kingdoms in Bali, Indonesia

Kingdom of Bali
- 914–1908
- Flag (Note: A merchant flag attributed to Bali, shown in European sources from the 18th century, also with six stripes)
- Anthem: ᬩᬮᬶ ᬤ᭄ᬯᬶᬧ ᬚᬬ! "Bali Dwipa Jaya!" ("Victorious Bali Island!")
- The maximum extent of the Balinese Kingdom of Gelgel in the mid-16th century.
- Status: Sovereign state (914–1343); Vassal state of the Majapahit Empire (1343–1478); Gelgel Kingdom (1478-1661); Nine Kingdoms period (1686–1908)
- Capital: Bedulu (Warmadewa period); Samprangan (Majapahit period); Gelgel (Gelgel period); Klungkung (Nine Kingdoms period)
- Common languages: Balinese (official, court language, high literature, lingua franca, administration); Kawi and Sanskrit (religious) Regional: Sasak; Osing; Sumbawa; Balinese Malay
- Religion: State religion: Hinduism Minority: Mahāyāna Budhism
- Demonym: Balinese
- Government: Monarchy
- Raja, Arya, Maharaja, Dalem, Dewa Agung
  - c. 914 (first): Śrī Kesarī Warmadewa
  - c. late 10th century: Udayana Warmadewa (Udayana the Great)
  - c. early 11th century: Anak Wungçu
  - c. 1180: Jayapangus
  - c. 1352: Sri Aji Kresna Kepakisan
  - c. 1460-1550: Dalem Baturenggong
  - c. 1903-1908 (last): Dewa Agung Jambé II
- Legislature: Paruman Agung (Note: Also known as the Council of Monarch/Council of Kings active from 1938 to 1950 that consisting of nine monarchs of Bali)
- History
  - Sri Kesari Warmadewa created the Belanjong pillar: 13 or 27 February 914
  - Dutch invasion against Klungkung: 18 April 1908
- Currency: Native silver coins and Chinese cash kepeng coins (pis bolong)
Preceded by
Prehistoric Indonesia
Mataram Kingdom
Majapahit
Succeeded by
Dutch East Indies
- Today part of: Indonesia ∟ Bali ∟ East Java ∟ West Nusa Tenggara

The Bali Kingdom (Note: Balinese: ᭚ᬓᭂᬭᬚ᭡ᬦ᭄ᬩᬮᬶ, romanized: Kĕrajaan Bali, Indonesian: Kerajaan Bali, Javanese: ꦌꦫꦗꦴꦤ꧀ ꦄꦭꦶ, romanized: Krājaan Bali, Sanskrit: बाली राज्यं, romanized: Bālī rājyaṁ) was a series of Hindu-Buddhist kingdoms that once ruled some parts of the volcanic island of Bali, in Lesser Sunda Islands, Indonesia. With a history of native Balinese kingship spanning from the early 10th to early 20th centuries, Balinese kingdoms demonstrated sophisticated Balinese court culture where native elements of spirit and ancestral reverence combined with Hindu influences—adopted from India through ancient Java intermediary—flourished, enriched and shaped Balinese culture.

Because of its proximity and close cultural relations with the neighbouring island of Java during the Indonesian Hindu-Buddhist period, the history of the Bali Kingdom was often intertwined with and heavily influenced by its Javanese counterparts, from Mataram (c. 9th century) to the Majapahit empire in the 13th to 15th centuries. The culture, language, arts and architecture of the island was influenced by Java. Javanese influences and presences grew even stronger with the fall of the Majapahit empire in the late 15th century. After the empire fell to its Muslim vassal the Demak Sultanate, a number of Hindu Majapahit courtiers, nobles, priests, and artisans found refuge on the island of Bali. As a result, Bali became what historian Ramesh Chandra Majumdar describes as the last stronghold of Indo-Javanese culture and civilisation. The Bali Kingdom in the following centuries expanded its influence to neighboring islands and began to establish colonies; Gelgel Kingdom Bali, for example, expanded their influence and established a colony in the Blambangan region at the eastern tip of Java to the western part of the Sumbawa island, while Karangasem Kingdom established their colonial settlements in western parts of Lombok, and the Klungkung kingdom conquered Nusa Penida in a later period.

Since the mid-19th century, the colonial state of the Dutch East Indies began its involvement in Bali, as it launched its campaign against the Balinese minor kingdoms one by one. By the early 20th century, the Dutch had completed their conquest of Bali as these minor kingdoms fell under their control, either by force resulting in Puputan fighting followed by mass ritual suicide, or surrendering gracefully to the Dutch. Either way, despite some of these Balinese royal houses still surviving, these events ended a millennium of the native Balinese independent kingdoms, as the local government changed to Dutch colonial administration, and later to the provincial government of Bali within the Republic of Indonesia.

== History ==
=== Prehistory ===
Bali has been inhabited by humans since Paleolithic times (1 Million BCE to 200,000 BCE), testified by the finding of ancient tools such as hand axes in Sembiran and Trunyan villages in Bali, followed by the Mesolithic period (200,000–3,000 BCE). However, the ancestors of the current Balinese inhabitants reached the island around 3,000 to 600 BCE during the Neolithic period, characterised by rice-growing technology and speaking Austronesian languages. The Bronze Age period followed, from around 600 BCE to 800 CE.

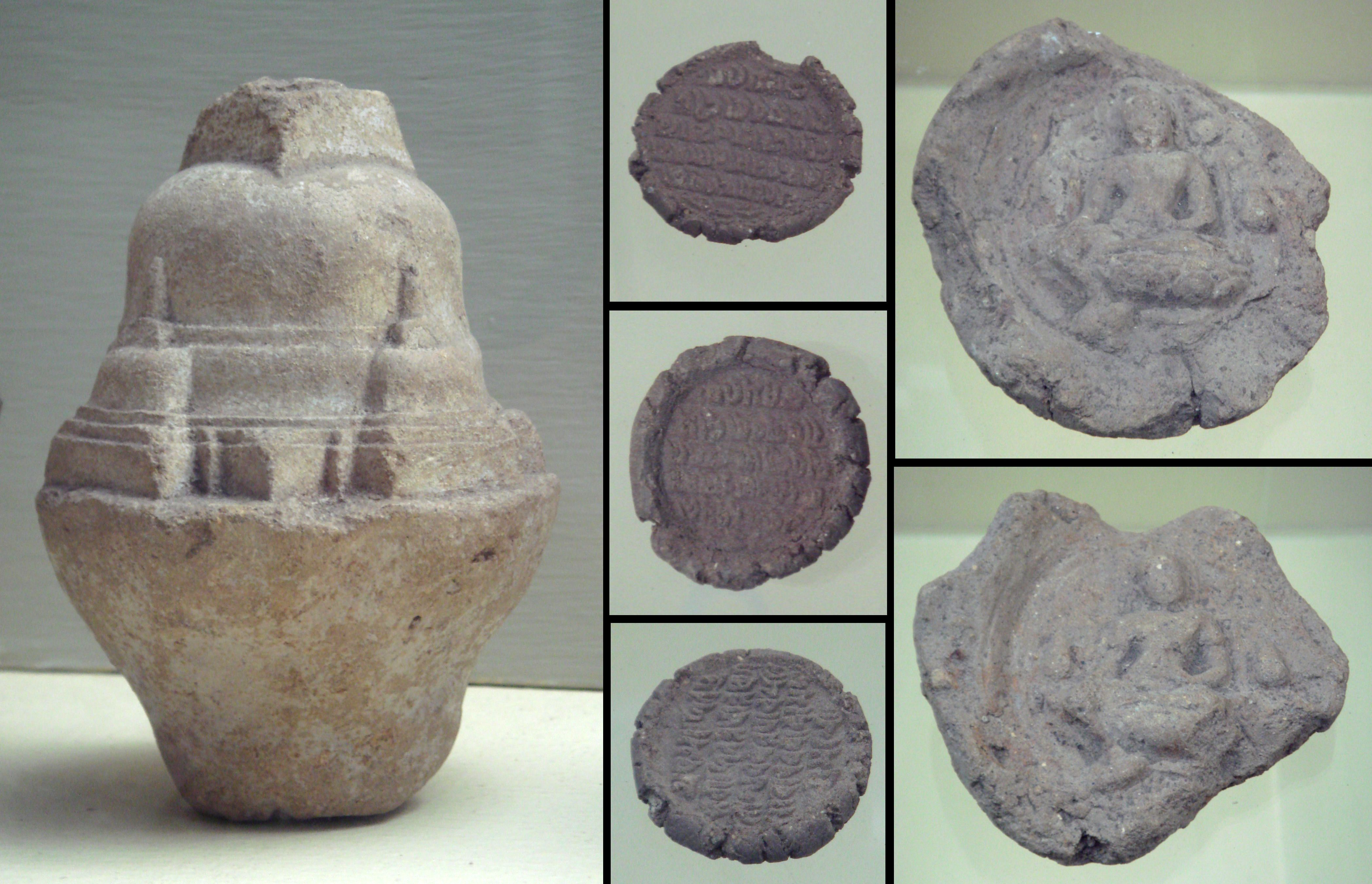
Stupika which contains Buddhist votive tablets, 8th-century Bali. The bell-shaped stupas are similar to Central Javanese Buddhist art

=== Early kingdom ===
The historical period in Bali started in c. 8th century, marked by the discovery of inscribed Buddhist votive clay tablets. These Buddhist votive tablets, found in small clay stupa figurines called "stupikas", are the first known written inscriptions in Bali and date from around the 8th century CE. Such stupikas have been found in the regency of Gianyar, and the villages of Pejeng, Tatiapi, and Blahbatuh. The bell-shaped stupikas bear resemblances to the style of the 8th-century stupas of Central Javanese Buddhist art found in Borobudur and other Buddhist temples dating from that period, which suggested the Sailendra link to Buddhist pilgrims or inhabitants in the early history of Bali.

In the early 10th century, a king called Sri Kesari Warmadewa issued the Belanjong pillar inscription found near the southern strip of Sanur Beach. It is the oldest inscription found in Bali that names the ruler who issued it. The pillar is dated 914 CE according to the Indian Saka calendar. Three other inscriptions by Kesari are known in central Bali, which suggest conflict in the mountainous interior of the island. Sri Kesari is the first known ruler to bear the Warmadewa title, which was used by rulers for several generations before Javanese expansion.

It is not known precisely where the capital of the kingdom was during the 10th and 11th centuries, but the political, religious, and cultural centre of the kingdom may have been in the present-day Gianyar Regency, inferred from the concentration of archaeological finds in this area. The stone cave temple and bathing place of Goa Gajah, near Ubud in Gianyar, was made around the same period. It shows a combination of Buddhist and Hindu Shivaite iconography. Several carvings of stupas, stupikas (small stupas), and images of Boddhisattvas suggest that the Warmadewa dynasty was a patron of Mahayana Buddhism. Nevertheless, Hinduism was also practised in Bali during this period.

=== Javanese ties ===
In the second half of the 10th century, Bali was ruled by King Udayana Warmadewa and his queen, Mahendradatta, a princess of the Isyana dynasty from East Java. Mahendradatta was the daughter of King Sri Makutawangsawarddhana and sister of King Dharmawangsa of Mataram kingdom. The presence of a Javanese queen in the Balinese court suggests that either Bali had allied with East Java, or Bali was Java's vassal; their marriage was a political arrangement to seal Bali as part of the East Javanese Mataram realm. The royal Balinese couple was the parents of the famous king of Java, Airlangga (1001–late 1040s). Airlangga's younger brothers Marakata and later Anak Wungçu rose to the Balinese throne.

The rock-cut candi shrine of Gunung Kawi in Tampaksiring was made around the same period. It demonstrates a similar temple style of Java during the late Mataram period. The Warmadewa dynasty continued to rule Bali well until the 12th century with the reigns of Jayasakti (1146–50) and Jayapangus (1178–81). Contacts with imperial China were also important during this period. Chinese coins called kepeng were widely in use in the Balinese economy. In the 12th century, King Jayapangus of northern Bali is known to have married a Chinese princess and has been immortalised through the Barong Landung art form as the effigy of the king and his Chinese consort.

After the Warmadewa dynasty, their descendant, and their link to the Javanese court, there is no continuous further detailed information found about the rulers of Bali. It seems that Bali had developed a new native dynasty quite independent from Java.

In the late 13th century, Bali once again appeared in Javanese sources. In 1284, the Javanese king Kertanegara launched a military offensive expedition against the Balinese ruler. According to the Javanese chronicle Deśavarṇana: "In Śaka 'bodies-sky-suns' (1206, AD 1284) he then sent emissaries to Bali to crush it, and before long its queen was overcome and duly brought as captive before the King" (42.1). This expedition seems to have integrated Bali into Singhasari’s realm. However, after the Jayakatwang rebellion of Gelang-gelang in 1292 that led to the death of Kertanegara and the fall of Singhasari, Java was unable to assert their rule upon Bali, and once again Balinese rulers enjoyed their independence from Java.

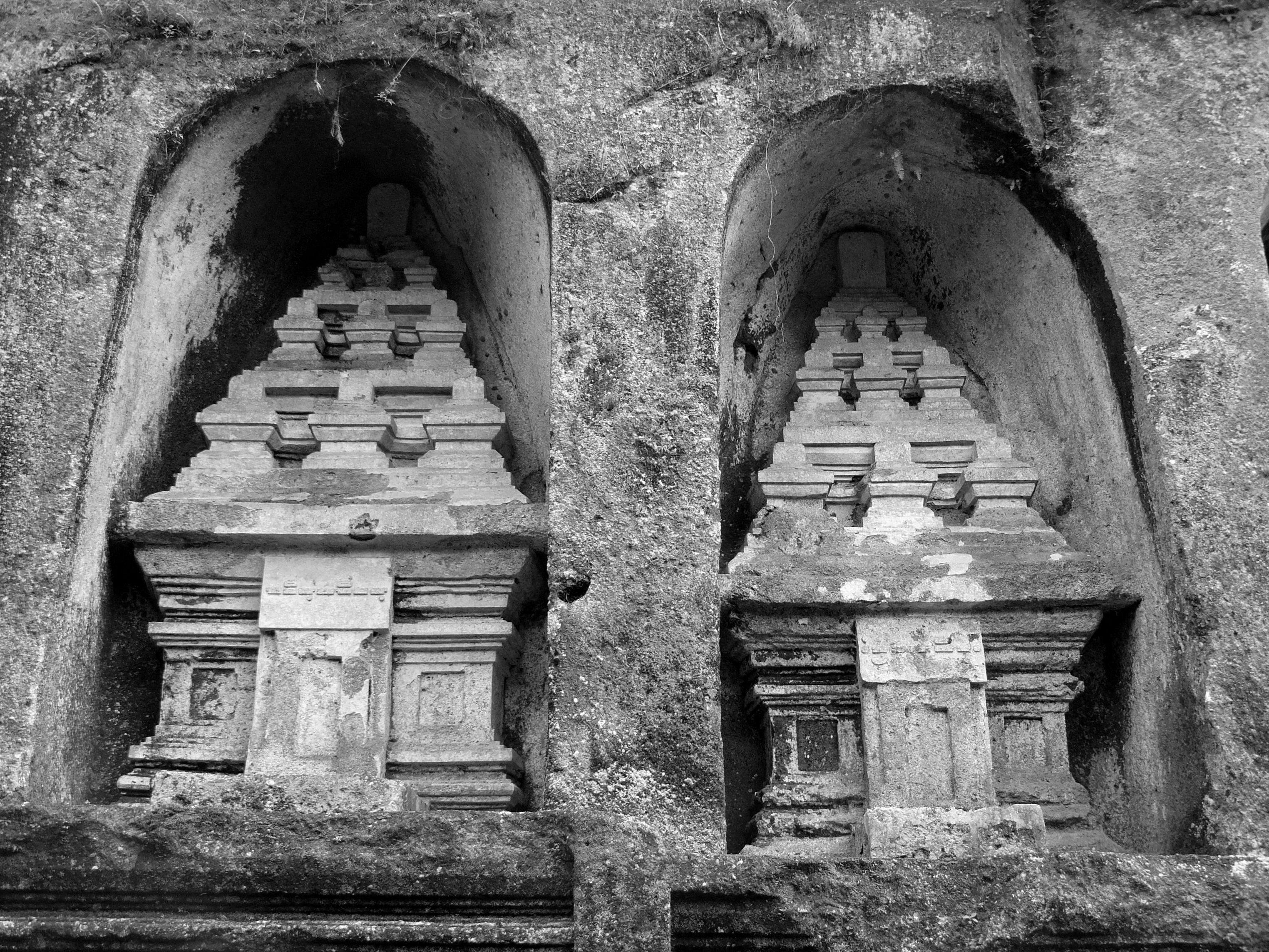
Gunung Kawi rock-cut candi shrines demonstrate similar temple style of Java during the late Mataram period.

The Javanese contacts led to a deep impact on the language of Bali which was impacted by the Kawi language, a style of Old Javanese. The language is still used in Bali though is rare.

=== Majapahit period ===
In East Java, Majapahit under the reign of queen regnant Tribhuwana Wijayatunggadewi and her able and ambitious Prime Minister Gajah Mada, saw the expansion of Majapahit armada into neighbouring islands in Indonesian archipelago including nearby Bali. According to Babad Arya Tabanan manuscript, in 1342 Majapahit troops led by Gajah Mada assisted by his general Arya Damar, the regent of Palembang, landed in Bali. After seven months of battles, Majapahit forces defeated the Balinese king in Bedulu (Bedahulu) in 1343. After the conquest of Bali, Majapahit distributed the governing authority of Bali among Arya Damar's younger brothers; Arya Kenceng, Arya Kutawandira, Arya Sentong and Arya Belog. Arya Kenceng led his brothers to govern Bali under Majapahit banner, he would become the ancestor of Balinese kings of Tabanan and Badung royal houses.

Canto 14 of the Nagarakretagama, composed during the reign of Hayam Wuruk in 1365, mentioned several places in Bali; Bedahulu and Lwa Gajah (identified as Goa Gajah) as places under Majapahit dominion. The Majapahit capital in Bali was established at Samprangan and later Gelgel. Following Hayam Wuruk's death in 1389, Majapahit entered a steady period of decline with conflict over succession, among other was Regreg war (1404 to 1406).

In 1468 Prince Kertabhumi rebelled against King Singhawikramawardhana and captured Trowulan. The usurped king moved the capital further inland to Daha (the former capital of Kadiri), effectively split Majapahit into two centres of powers; Trowulan and Daha. Singhawikramawardhana was succeeded by his son Ranawijaya in 1474, that ruled from Daha. To keep Majapahit influence and economic interest, Kertabhumi awarded Muslim merchant trading rights on the north coast of Java, an action which led to the prominence of Demak Sultanate in following decades. This policy increased Majapahit economy and influence, but weaken Hindu - Buddha's position as the main religion, as Islam began to spread faster and freely in Java. Hindu - Buddha followers' grievance later urged Ranawijaya to defeat Kertabumi.

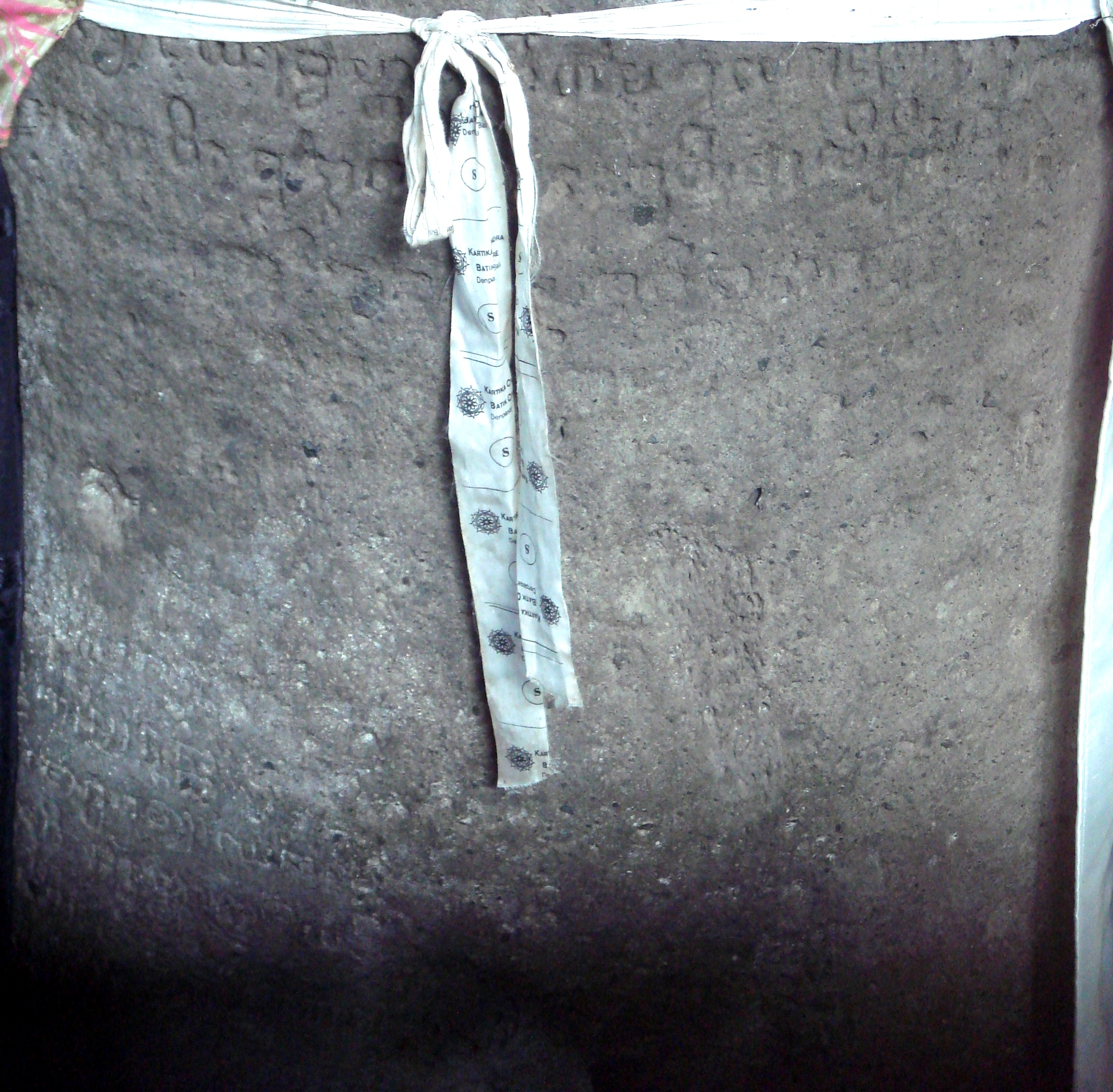
The Belanjong pillar in Sanur (914), one of the earliest inscription in Bali

In 1478, Ranawijaya's army under general Udara breached Trowulan defences and killed Kertabumi in his palace, Demak sent reinforcements under Sunan Ngudung, who later died in battle and was replaced by Sunan Kudus, but they came too late to save Kertabumi although they managed to repel the Ranawijaya's army. This event is mentioned in Jiwu and Petak inscription, where Ranawijaya claimed that he already defeated Kertabhumi and reunited Majapahit as one Kingdom. Ranawijaya ruled from 1474 to 1498 with the formal name Girindrawardhana, with Udara as his vice-regent. This event led to the war between Sultanate of Demak and Daha, since Demak ruler, Raden Patah, were the descendant of Kertabhumi.

In 1498, vice regent Udara usurped Girindrawardhana and the war between Demak and Daha recede. But this delicate balance end when Udara ask help to Portugal in Malacca and led Adipati Yunus of Demak to attack both Malacca and Daha. Another theory suggested that the reasons for the Demak's attacks against Majapahit was a revenge against Girindrawardhana, who had defeated Adipati Yunus' grandfather Prabu Bhre Kertabumi (Prabu Brawijaya V). The defeat of Daha under Demak marked the end of Hindu Majapahit era in Java. After the fall of the empire, many Majapahit nobles, artisans and priests took refuge either in the interior mountainous region of East Java, Blambangan in eastern end of Java, or across the narrow strait to Bali. The refugees probably fled to avoid Demak's retribution for their support for Ranawijaya against Kertabhumi.

The Javanese Majapahit empire influenced Bali both culturally and politically. The whole court of Majapahit fled to Bali following the conquest by the Muslim rulers in 1478, in effect resulting in the transfer of the whole culture. Bali was looked on as the continuation of the Hindu Javanese culture and is the major source of knowledge about it in the modern times. The incoming Javanese nobles and priests established Majapahit-style courts in Bali. The influx led to several important developments. The marriage of prominent Balinese families along with Majapahit royalty led to the foundation of upper caste lineages of Bali. Javanese ideas especially the Majapahit tradition influenced the religion and arts of the island. The Javanese language also affected the spoken Balinese language. The modern Bali architecture and temples share much in common with aesthetics and style of bas-reliefs in East Javanese temples from the Majapahit golden age. Large numbers of Majapahit manuscripts, such as Nagarakretagama, Sutasoma, Pararaton and Tantu Pagelaran, were being well-kept in royal libraries of Bali and Lombok, and provides the glimpse and valuable historical records on Majapahit. As a result of the influx of the Javanese element, historian Ramesh Chandra Majumdar states that Bali "soon became the last stronghold of Indo-Javanese culture and civilisation."

=== Kingdom of Gelgel ===
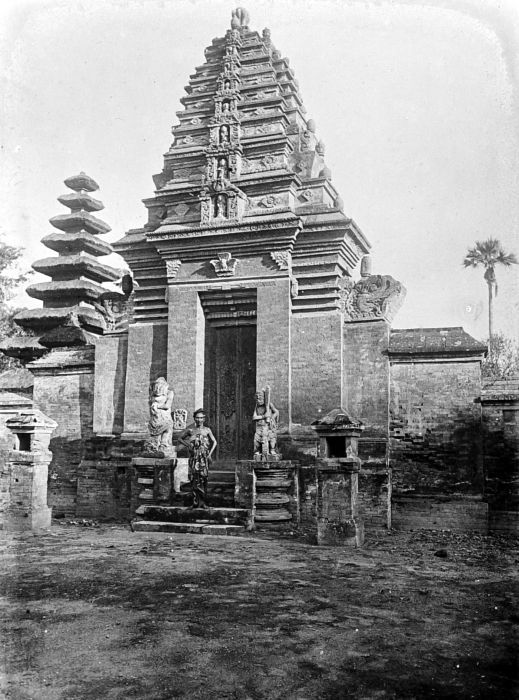
The gate in Gelgel, the old royal capital of Bali

According to the Babad Dalem manuscript (composed in 18th century), the conquest of Bali by the Hindu Javanese kingdom of Majapahit was followed by the installation of a vassal dynasty in Samprangan in the present-day Gianyar regency, close to the old royal centre Bedulu. This event took place in the mid-14th century. The first Samprangan ruler Sri Aji Kresna Kepakisan sired three sons. Of these the eldest, Dalem Samprangan, succeeded to the rulership but turned out to be an incompetent ruler. His youngest brother Dalem Ketut founded a new royal seat in Gelgel while Samprangan lapsed in obscurity.

The first European contact with Bali was made in 1512, when a Portuguese expedition led by Antonio Abreu and Francisco Serrão sailed from Portuguese Malacca and reached northern coast of Bali. Bali was also mapped in 1512, in the chart of Francisco Rodrigues. In Majapahit, East Java, the fall of Daha to Demak Sultanate in 1527 has prompted the refuge of Hindu nobles, priests and artisans to Bali. In 1585, the Portuguese government in Malacca sent a ship to establish a fort and a trading post in Bali, but the mission failed as ship foundered on the reef of the Bukit peninsula.

By the 16th century, the Puri (Balinese court) of Gelgel become a powerful polity in the region. The successor of Dewa Ketut, Dalem Baturenggong, reigned in the mid-16th century. He received a Javanese sage called Nirartha who fled from the decline of Hinduism in Java. The King become the patron of Nirartha, who carried out an extensive literary works that formed the spiritualism of Balinese Hinduism. Gelgel reached its apogee during the reign of Dalem Baturenggong, as Lombok, western Sumbawa and Blambangan on easternmost Java, were united under Gelgel's suzerainty. Gelgel's influence over the still Hindu Blambangan seems to caught the attention the Sultan of Mataram that aspired to unite the whole of Java and also to spread Islamic faith. In 1639 Mataram launched an invasion to Blambangan. Kingdom of Gelgel immediately supported Blambangan as a buffer against the Islamic expansion of Muslim Mataram. Blambangan surrendered in 1639, but quickly regained their independence and rejoined Bali soon after the Mataram troops withdrew. Mataram Sultanate itself, after the death of Sultan Agung, seems to preoccupied in their internal problems, and lost interest to continue their campaign and pursue hostilities against Blambangan and Gelgel.

=== Nine kingdoms of Bali ===
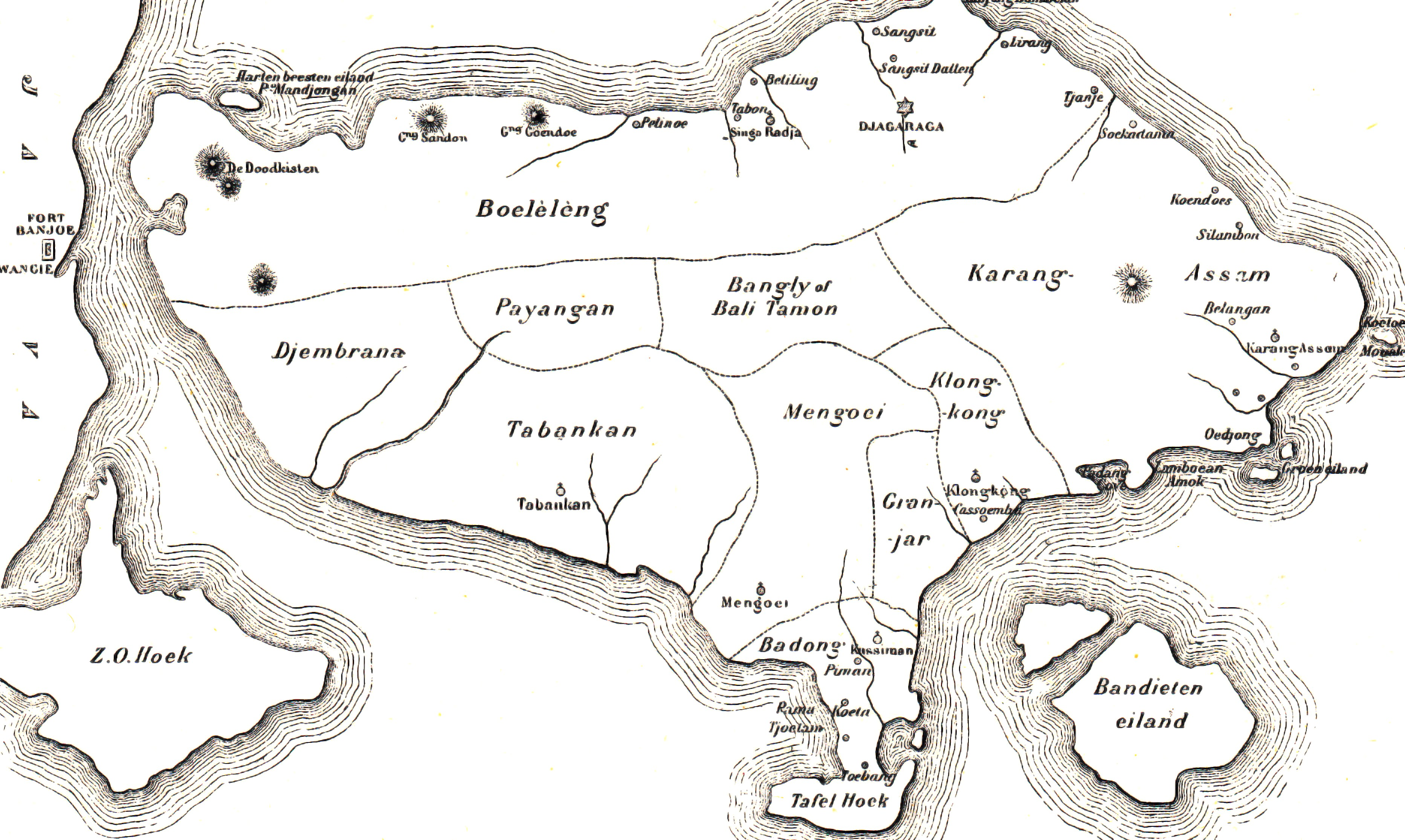
Map of Balinese nine kingdoms, circa 1900

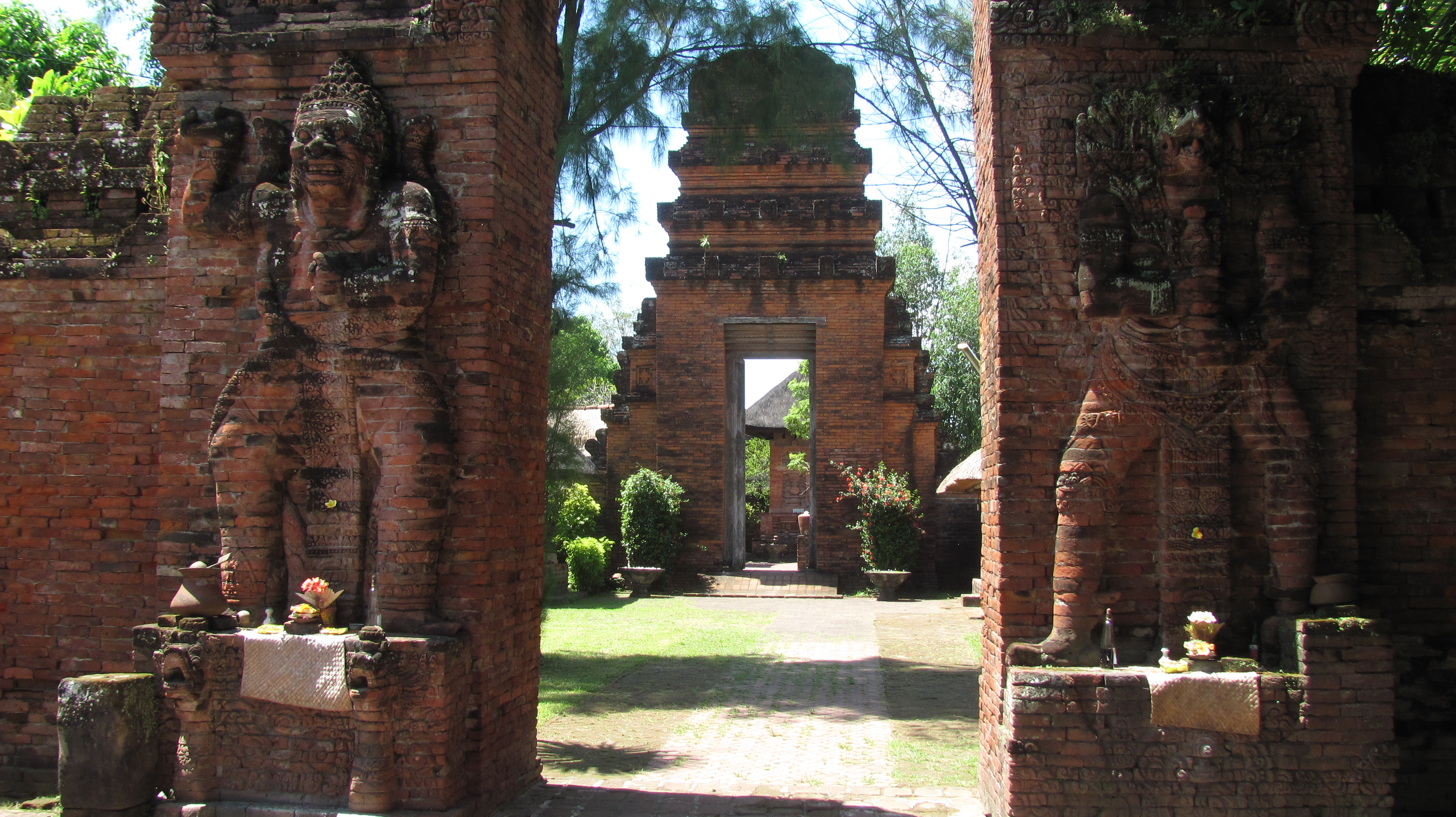
Pura Maospahit ("Majapahit Temple") in Denpasar, Bali, demonstrates the typical Majapahit red brick architecture.

After 1651 the Gelgel kingdom began to break up due to internal conflicts. In 1686 a new royal seat was established in Klungkung, four kilometres north of Gelgel. The rulers of Klungkung, known by the title Dewa Agung, were however unable to maintain power over Bali. The island was in fact split into nine minor kingdoms; Klungkung, Buleleng, Karangasem, Mengwi, Badung, Tabanan, Gianyar, Bangli and Jembrana. These minor kingdoms developed their own dynasty, built their own Puri (Balinese palace compound) and established their own government. Nevertheless, these nine kingdoms of Bali admitted Klungkung leadership, that the Dewa Agung kings of Klungkung are their primus inter pares among Balinese kings, and deserved the honourable titular as the king of Bali. Most of these kingdoms today formed the base and boundaries of Kabupaten (regencies) of Bali.

In following centuries, the various kingdoms fought a succession of incessant wars among themselves, although they accorded the Dewa Agung a symbolic paramount status of Bali. This led to complicated relations amongst Balinese rulers, as there are many kings in Bali. This situation lasted until the coming of the Dutch in the 19th century.

=== Foreign intervention ===
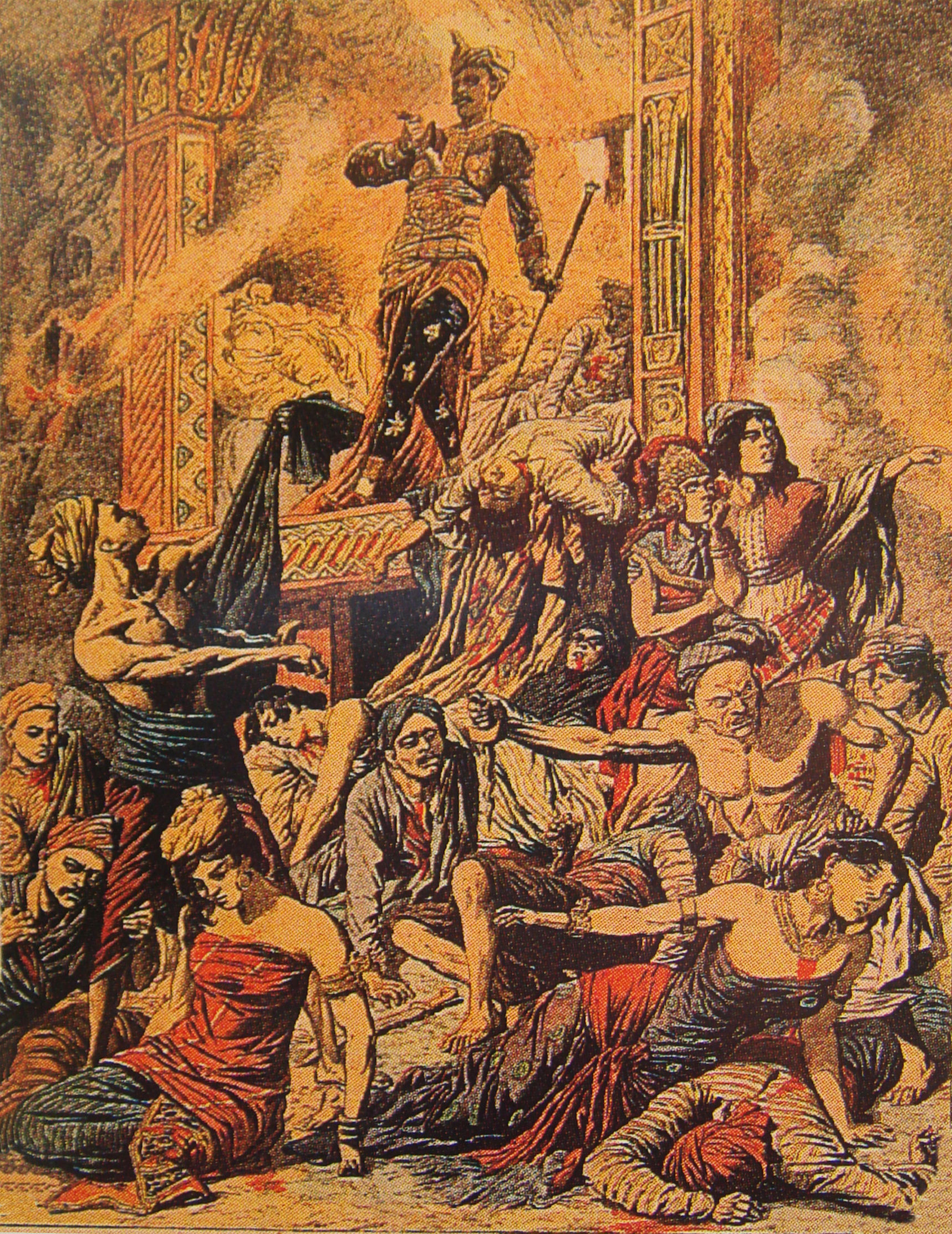
The Raja of Buleleng killing himself with 400 followers, in an 1849 puputan against the Dutch

Although European contact had been made since 1512 and later in 1585 by the Portuguese fleet, no real presence of European power was felt in Bali as the Balinese kingdoms continued their way of life preserved since the Hindu Majapahit era. In 1597, Dutch ships with Cornelis de Houtman arrived in Bali. A second Dutch expedition appeared in 1601, that of Jacob van Heemskerck. On this occasion, the Dalem of Gelgel sent a letter to Prince Maurits, a translation of which was sent by Cornells van Eemskerck. The letter granted the Dutch permission to trade in Bali as well as stating Bali's request to freely trade with the Dutch. This diplomatic letter of friendship and trade agreement was mistranslated as Balinese recognition of Dutch overlordship and was subsequently used by the Dutch to lay their claims to the island. Although the VOC — centred in Batavia (now Jakarta) — was very active in the Maluku Islands, Java and Sumatra, it took little interest in Bali, as the VOC was more interested in the spice trade, a produce scarce in Bali which was mainly a rice agriculture kingdom. The opening of a trading post was attempted in 1620 but failed due to local hostility. The VOC left the Bali trade to private traders, mainly Chinese, Arab, Bugis and occasionally Dutch, who mainly dealt with opium and slave trade.

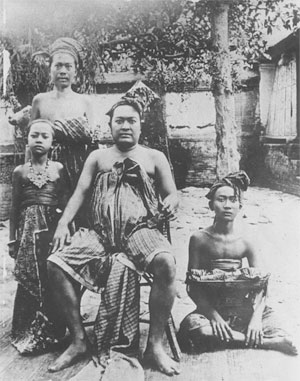
Dewa Agung of Klungkung in 1908

However, the Dutch indifference to Bali totally changed in the 19th century, as Dutch colonial control expanded across the Indonesian archipelago and they began to covet the island. The Dutch used the pretext of eradicating opium smuggling, arms running, Balinese tawan karang tradition (plunder of shipwrecks), and slavery to impose their control on Balinese kingdoms. The Dutch East Indies army invaded northern Bali in 1846, 1848, and finally in 1849 the Dutch were able to take control of the northern Bali kingdoms of Buleleng and Jembrana.

In 1894, the Dutch used the Sasak rebellion against Balinese ruler of western Lombok, as a pretext to interfere and conquer Lombok. The Dutch supported the Sasak rebellion, and launched a military expedition against Balinese court in Mataram, Lombok. By the end of November 1894, the Dutch had annihilated the Balinese positions, with thousands dead, and the Balinese surrendered or committed puputan ritual suicide. Lombok and Karangasem became part of the Dutch East Indies. Soon the court of Bangli and Gianyar also accepted Dutch suzerainty, but southern Bali kept resisting.

In 1906 the Dutch launched a military expedition against the southern Bali kingdom of Badung and Tabanan, and weakened the kingdom of Klungkung, again under the pretext of Balinese tawan karang tradition (plunder of shipwrecks). Finally in 1908, the Dutch launched an invasion against the court of Klungkung, under the pretext of securing their opium monopoly. This event concluded the Dutch conquest over Bali, and by then it had become a Dutch protectorate. Although some members of Balinese royalties still survived, the Dutch had completely dismantled the royal institutions of Bali, destroyed the power and authority of Balinese kings and thus ended centuries of Balinese kingdoms' rule. During the Dutch East Indies period, the colonial capital of Bali and Lesser Sunda Islands was located in Singaraja on the northern coast.

== See also ==
- List of monarchs of Bali
- Bali Museum

== Bibliography ==
- Willard A. Hanna (2004). Bali Chronicles. Periplus, Singapore. ISBN 0-7946-0272-X.
