= List of monarchs of Bali =

Monarch of Bali
- Raja, Arya, Maharaja, Dalem, Dewa Agung
- A merchant flag attributed to Bali, shown in European sources from the 18th century, also with six stripes

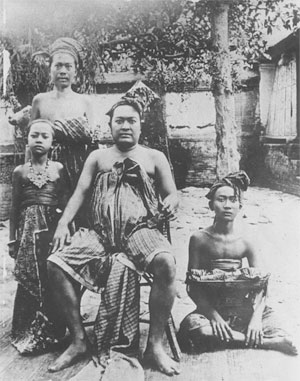
- Last to reign Dewa Agung Jambé II; 1903–1908

Details
- Style: His Majesty (ᬓᭂᬭᬚ)
- First monarch: Śrī Kesarī Warmadewa
- Last monarch: Dewa Agung Jambé II
- Formed: c. 914
- Abolished: April 18, 1908
- Residence: All of Puri in Bali
- Appointer: Hereditary

This is a list of monarchs of the Bali Kingdom, an island in the Indonesian archipelago. Included are, first, rulers on an island-wide level, and, second, rajas of minor states that arose in the 17th and 18th centuries. The sequence and dates of the rulers are not always securely documented, and conflicting statements may be found in various textbooks. The following list is based on epigraphic records, Balinese chronicles (babad), and data supplied by Dutch colonial sources.

Balinese royal lineages and monarchies claim to continue to exist in Bali; however, due to Indonesian postcolonial governance, the prerogatives of the original rulers of Bali were suppressed in the decade after the Revolution. Hinduism has remained an integral part of the Balinese monarchies and culture, despite issues involving Dutch invaders and Indonesian central authorities and military.

== Ancient queens and kings of Bali ==
=== Warmadewa Dynasty ===
- Śri Kesari Warmadewa (fl. 914)
- Ugrasena (fl. 915-942)
- Tabanendra Warmadewa (fl. 955-967)
- Indrajayasingha Warmadewa (co-regent, fl. 960)
- Janasadhu Warmadewa (fl. 975)
- Śri Wijaya Mahadewi (queen, fl. 983)
- Gunapriya Dharmapatni (queen, before 989-1007)
- Dharma Udayana Warmadewa (fl. 989-1011) [husband]
- Śri Ajñadewi (queen, fl. 1016)
- Dharmawangsa Wardhana Marakatapangkaja (fl. 1022-1025) [son of Dharma Udayana]
- Airlangga (c. 1025-1042; King in Java from 1019) [brother]
- Anak Wungsu (fl. 1049-1077) [brother]
- Śri Maharaja Walaprabhu (between 1079 and 1088)
- Śri Maharaja Sakalendukirana Laksmidhara Wijayottunggadewi (queen, fl. 1088-1101)
- Śri Suradhipa (fl. 1115-1119)

=== Jaya Dynasty ===
- Śri Jayaśakti (fl. 1133-1150)
- Ragajaya (fl. 1155)
- Jayapangus (fl. 1178-1181)
- Arjayadengjayaketana (queen, fl. 1200)
- Haji Ekajayalancana (co-regent fl. 1200) [son]
- Bhatara Guru Śri Adikuntiketana (fl. 1204)
- Adidewalancana (1260-1286)
- Queen of Bali, name unknown (?–1284) – in 1284, Kertanegara attacked Bali and captured the queen of Bali

Singasari subjugates Bali 1284AD

=== Singasari Dynasty ===
- Kryan Demung Sasabunglan (1284)
- Rajapatih Makakasar Kebo Parud (Governor, fl. 1296-1324)
- Sri Masula Masuli (1324)

Singasari collapses and Bali becomes independent kingdom

=== Warmadewa Dynasty II ===
- Mahaguru Dharmottungga Warmadewa (before 1324-1328)
- Walajayakertaningrat (1328-1332) [son]
- Śri Astasura Ratna Bumi Banten (1332-1343)

Majapahit conquers Bali 1343

== Queens and Kings of Bali after 1343 ==
=== Dynasty of Kepakisan in Samprangan and Gelgel ===
Vassalage under Majapahit 1343 - 1527

- Sri Aji Kresna Kepakisan (mid 14th century or c. 1471), King of Bali in Samprangan
- Dalem Samprangan (fl. 1502) [son]
- Dalem Ketut (fl. 1456 or c. 1520), King of Bali in Gelgel [brother]
- Dalem Baturenggong (mid 16th century) [son]
- Dalem Bekung (fl. 1558-1578) [son]
- Dalem Seganing (c. 1580-1623 or ?-1650) [son]
- Dalem Di Made (1623-1642) [son]
- Dewa Pacekan (1642–1650; position uncertain) [son]
- Dewa Cawu (1651-c. 1655,) died 1673; position uncertain) [uncle]
- Anglurah Agung (usurper c. 1665-1686)

=== Titular Kings of Bali in Klungkung (Dewa Agung) ===
- Dewa Agung Jambe I (1686-c. 1722) [son or kinsman of Dalem Di Made]
- Dewa Agung Gede (c. 1722-1736) [son]
- Dewa Agung Made (1736-c. 1760) [son]
- Dewa Agung Śakti (c. 1760-1790; deposed, died c. 1814) [son]
- Dewa Agung Putra I Kusamba (c. 1790-1809) [son]
- Gusti Ayu Karang (regent 1809-1814)
- Dewa Agung Putra II (1814–1850; ruler (susuhunan) of Bali and Lombok until 1849) [son of Dewa Agung Putra I]
- Dewa Agung Istri Kanya (queen, 1814–1850, died 1868)
- Dutch suzerainty 1843-1908
- Dewa Agung Putra III Bhatara Dalem (1851–1903) [grandson of Dewa Agung Sakti]
- Dewa Agung Jambe II (1903–1908; ruler (susuhunan) of Klungkung until 1904) [son]
- Direct Dutch rule 1908-1929
- Dewa Agung Oka Geg (1929–1951, died 1964) [nephew]
- Klungkung incorporated in the Indonesian unitary state 1950

== Rajas of Mengwi ==
- Gusti Agung Śakti (Gusti Agung Anom) (c. 1690-1722)
- Gusti Agung Made Alangkajeng (1722-c. 1740) [son]
- Gusti Agung Putu Mayun (1740s) [nephew]
- Gusti Agung Made Munggu (1740s-1770/80) [brother]
- Gusti Agung Putu Agung (1770/80-1793/94) [son]
- Gusti Ayu Oka Kaba-Kaba (regent 1770/80-1807) [mother, grandmother]
- Gusti Agung Ngurah Made Agung I (1807–1823) [son of Gusti Agung Putu Agung]
- Gusti Agung Ngurah Made Agung II Putra (1829–1836) [son]
- Gusti Agung Ketut Besakih (1836-1850/55) [brother]
- Dutch suzerainty 1843-1891
- Gusti Ayu Istri Biang Agung (1836–1857) [widow of Gusti Agung Ngurah Made Agung Putra]
- Gusti Agung Ngurah Made Agung III (1859–1891) [descendant of Gusti Agung Putu Mayun]
- Mengwi destroyed by Klungkung, Badung, Gianyar and Tabanan 1891

== Rajas of Tabanan ==
- Śri Magade Nata [son]
- Gusti Ngurah Langwang (Prabhu Singasana) [son]
- Gusti Ngurah Tabanan (Prabhu Winalwan) [son]
- Gusti Wayahan Pamedekan (?-1647) [son]
- Gusti Made Pamedekan (1647-c. 1650) [brother]
- Gusti Ngurah Tabanan (Prabhu Winalwanan) (second time, c. 1650-?)
- Prabhu Nisweng Panida (?-1654?) [son of Gusti Made Pamedekan]
- Gusti Made Dalang (1654?-?) [brother]
- Gusti Nengah Malkangin [son of Gusti Wayahan Pamedekan]
- Gusti Bolo di Malkangin [son of Prabhu Winalwanan]
- Gusti Agung Badeng (regent late 17th century) [son-in-law of Gusti Made Pamedekan]
- Prabhu Magada Śakti (c. 1700) [son of Prabhu Nisweng Panida]
- Anglurah Mur Pamade [son]
- Gusti Ngurah Sekar (fl. 1734) [son]
- Gusti Ngurah Gede [son]
- Gusti Ngurah Made Rai (?-1793) [brother]
- Gusti Ngurah Rai Penebel (1793-c. 1820) [brother]
- Gusti Ngurah Ubung (c. 1820) [son]
- Gusti Ngurah Agung I (c. 1820-1843) [grandson of Gusti Ngurah Made Rai]
- Dutch suzerainty 1843-1906
- Gusti Ngurah Agung II (1843–1903) [son]
- Gusti Ngurah Rai Perang ( Gusti Ngurah Agung III)(1903–1906) [son]
- Dutch conquest 1906
- Cokorda Ngurah Ketut (1929–1939) [nephew]
- Gusti Ngurah Wayan (Jero Kompyang Tabanan) (regent 1939-1944)
- Cokorda Ngurah Gede (1944–1950, kepala 1950-1955, died 1987) [son of Cokorda Ngurah Ketut]
- Tabanan incorporated in the Indonesian unitary state 1950
- Cokorda Anglurah Tabanan (titular head of the dynasty 21 March 2008 - ...) [son]

== Rajas of Karangasem ==
- Gusti Nyoman Karang (c. 1600)
- Anglurah Ketut Karang [son]
- Anglurah Nengah Karangasem (late 17th century) [son]
- Anglurah Ketut Karangasem (fl. 1691-1692) [brother]
- Anglurah Made Karang [son of Anglurah Nengah Karangasem]
- Gusti Wayahan Karangasem (fl. 1730) [son of Anglurah Ketut Karangasem]
- Anglurah Made Karangasem Śakti (Bagawan Atapa Rare) (1730s) [son of Anglurah Made Karang]
- Anglurah Made Karangasem (1730s-1775) [son]
- Gusti Gede Ngurah Karangasem (1775–1806) [grandson]
- Gusti Gede Ngurah Lanang (1806–1822) [nephew]
- Gusti Gede Ngurah Pahang (1822) [grandson of Gusti Gede Ngurah Karangasem]
- Gusti Gede Ngurah Lanang (second time 1822-1828; died 1837)
- Gusti Bagus Karang (1828–1838; died 1839) [son of Gusti Gede Ngurah Karangasem]
- Gusti Gede Ngurah Karangasem (1838–1849) [nephew]
- Lombok overlordship in Karangasem 1849-1894
- Gusti Made Jungutan (Gusti Made Karangasem) (vassal ruler 1849-1850) [son-in-law, former punggawa (local chief)]
- Gusti Gede Putu (vassal ruler 1850-1893) [nephew of Lombok raja]
- Gusti Gede Oka (vassal ruler 1850-1890) [brother]
- Gusti Gede Jelantik (1890–1908; died 1916) [brother]
- Anak Agung Agung Anglurah Ketut Karangasem (1908–1950; died 1966) [son of Gusti Gede Putu]
- Karangasem incorporated in the Indonesian unitary state 1950
- Anak Agung Gde Jelantik (kepala 1951-1958) [son]

== Rajas of Jembrana ==
Agung Dynasty

- Gusti Agung Basangtamiang (17th century) [son of Gelgel minister Gusti Agung Widya]
- Gusti Brangbangmurti [son]
- Gusti Gede Giri (c. 1700) [son]
- Gusti Ngurah Tapa [son]
- Gusti Made Yasa [brother]
- Gusti Gede Andul (first half of the 18th century) [son]

Dynasty from Mengwi

- Gusti Ngurah Agung Jembrana (mid 18th century) [grandson of Gusti Agung Sakti of Mengwi]
- Gusti Ngurah Batu (regent ?-1766) [son]
- Gusti Gede Jembrana (1766-?) [nephew]
- Gusti Putu Andul (before 1797-1809) [son]
- Gusti Rahi (regent for Badung, fl. 1805)
- Kapitan Patimi (regent, Buginese, c. 1805-1808)
- Gusti Wayahan Pasekan (regent c. 1812-1814)
- Gusti Made Pasekan (regent c. 1812-1814) [brother]
- Gusti Putu Sloka (1809–1835) [son of Gusti Putu Andul]
- Gusti Alit Mas (regent c. 1835-1840)
- Gusti Putu Dorok (regent c. 1835-1840) [great-grandson of Gusti Ngurah Batu]
- Gusti Made Penarungan (regent c. 1840-1849)
- Gusti Ngurah Made Pasekan (regent c. 1840-1849)
- Dutch suzerainty 1843-1882
- Gusti Putu Ngurah Sloka (1849–1855; died 1876) [son of Gusti Putu Sloka]
- Gusti Ngurah Made Pasekan (patih 1849-1855; raja 1855-1866)
- Anak Agung Made Rai (regent 1867-1882; died 1905) [grandson of Gusti Putu Andul]
- Dutch direct rule in Jembrana 1882-1929
- Anak Agung Bagus Negara (1929–1950, kepala 1950-1960; died 1967) [grandson of Anak Agung Made Rai]
- Jembrana incorporated in the Indonesian unitary state 1950

== Rajas of Buleleng ==
Dynasty of Panji Śakti

- Gusti Panji Śakti (c. 1660-1697/99)
- Gusti Panji Wayahan Danurdarastra (1697/99-1732) [son]
- Gusti Alit Panji (1732-c. 1757/65) [son]
- Dependent on Mengwi first half of the 18th century
- Gusti Ngurah Panji (in Sukasadda c. 1757/65) [son]
- Dependent on Karangasem c. 1757-1806
- Gusti Ngurah Jelantik (in Singaraja c. 1757/65-c. 1780) [brother]
- Gusti Made Jelantik (c. 1780-1793) [son]
- Gusti Made Singaraja (1793-?) [nephew]

Karangasem Dynasty

- Anak Agung Rai (?-1806) [son of Gusti Gede Ngurah Karangasem]
- Gusti Gede Karang (1806–1818) [brother]
- Gusti Gede Ngurah Pahang (1818–1822) [son]
- Gusti Made Oka Sori (1822–1825) [nephew of Gusti Gede Karang]
- Gusti Ngurah Made Karangasem (1825–1849) [nephew of Gusti Gede Karang]

Dynasty of Panji Śakti

- Gusti Made Rai (1849, 1851–1853) [great-great-grandson of Gusti Ngurah Panji]
- Dependency of Bangli 1849-1854
- Gusti Ngurah Ketut Jelantik (1854–1873; regency 1853-1861; died 1893) [descended from Gusti Ngurah Jelantik]
- Dutch direct rule 1882-1929
- Anak Agung Putu Jelantik (regent 1929-1938; anak agung 1938-1944) [descended from Gusti Ngurah Jelantik]
- Anak Agung Nyoman Panji Tisna (1944–1947) [son]
- Anak Agung Ngurah Ketut Jelantik (1947–1950; died 1970) [brother]
- Buleleng incorporated in Indonesian unitary state 1950
- Anak Agung Nyoman Panji Tisna (kepala 1950-1958; died 1978)

== Rajas of Gianyar ==
- Dewa Manggis I Kuning (chief of Pahang)
- Dewa Manggis II Pahang (chief of Pahang) [son]
- Dewa Manggis III Bengkel (chief of Bengkel) [son]
- Dewa Manggis IV Jorog (Raja of Gianyar c. 1771–1788) [son]
- Dewa Manggis V di Madya (c. 1788–1820) [son]
- Dewa Manggis VI di Rangki (c. 1820-1847) [son]
- Dewa Manggis VII di Satria (1847–1884; died 1891) [son]
- Dependency of Klungkung 1884–1891
- Dewa Pahang (1891–1896) [son]
- Dewa Manggis VIII (Dewa Gede Raka until 1908) (1896–1912) [brother]
- Ide Anak Agung Ngurah Agung (ruler (anak agung) 1913–1943) [son]
- Ide Anak Agung Gede Agung (1943–1946; died 1999) [son]
- Ide Anak Agung Gede Oka (1946–1950, kepala 1950-1958; died 1993) [brother]
- Gianyar incorporated in the Indonesian unitary state 1950

== Rajas of Sukawati and Ubud ==
Dynasty from Klungkung

- Dewa Agung Anom (Raja of Sukawati before 1713-1733)
- Dewa Agung Gede Mayun Dalem Patemon (1733-before 1757) [son]
- Dewa Agung Gede Sukawati (c. 1757) [son]
- Dewa Agung Made Pliatan (second half of 18th century) [brother]

Lordship of Ubud, under Gianyar suzerainty

- Cokorda Putu Kandel (c. 1800) [son]
- Cokorda Sukawati (19th century) [son]
- Cokorda Rai Batur (fl. 1874) [son]
- Cokorda Gede Sukawati (before 1889-1919) [son]
- Cokorda Gede Raka Sukawati (1919–1931; died 1967) [son]
- Cokorda Gede Agung Sukawati (1931–1950; died 1978) [brother]
- Gianyar with Ubud incorporated in Indonesian unitary state 1950

== Rajas of Pamecutan in Badung ==
Dynasty from Tabanan

- Prabhu Bandana, Arya Notor Wanira (17th century) [son of Shri Magade Nata, King of Tabanan]
- Gusti Ngurah Papak [son]
- Gusti Jambe Pule (c. 1660-1683) [son]
- Split in a Jambe and Pamecutan line 1683
- Gusti Jambe Merik (1683-?) [son]
- Gusti Jambe Ketewel [son]
- Gusti Jambe Tangkeban (c. 1757) [son]
- Gusti Jambe Aji [son]
- Gusti Jambe Ksatria (?-1780) [son]

Rajas of Pamecutan

- Gusti Macan Gading (1683-?) [son of Gusti Jambe Pule]
- Kyai Anglurah Pamecutan Śakti (fl. 1718) [son]
- Kyai Anglurah Pamecutan Mur ing Ukiran [son]
- Kyai Anglurah Pamecutan Bhija [son]
- Split in a Pamecutan and Den Pasar line c. 1780
- Kyai Agung Gede Raka (?-1813) [son]
- Kyai Anglurah Pamecutan Mur ing Gedong (1813–1829) [son]
- Anak Agung Lanang (1829–1840) [grandson of Kyai Anglurah Pamecutan Bhija]
- Kyai Agung Gede Woka Mur ing Madarda (1840–1851) [son]
- Cokorda Agung Pamecutan (ruler (cokorda) 1851-1906) [nephew]
- Dutch conquest of Badung with Pamecutan 1906
- Cokorda Ngurah Gede Pamecutan (of entire Badung 1946-1950, kepala 1950-1959; died 1986) [grandnephew]
- Badung included in the Indonesian unitary state 1950

== Rajas of Kasiman in Badung ==
- Gusti Ngurah Gede Kasiman (1813–1861) [son of Gusti Ngurah Made Pamecutan of Den Pasar]
- Gusti Ngurah Ketut Geledog (1861–1904) [son]
- Anak Agung Ngurah Mayun (1904–1906)
- Dutch conquest of Badung with Kasiman 1906
- Gusti Ngurah Made (lord (punggawa) 1927-1954; died 1959) [son]

== Rajas of Denpasar in Badung ==
- Gusti Ngurah Made Pamecutan (Kaleran) (before 1780-1817) [great-grandson of Kyai Anglurah Pamecutan Sakti]
- Gusti Ngurah Made Pamecutan Dewata di Satria (1817–1828) [son]
- Domination by Kasiman 1829-1861
- Gusti Ngurah Gede Oka (titular raja 1829-1842/48) [son]
- Gusti Ngurah Made Pamecutan (titular raja, mid 19th century) [brother]
- Gusti Gede Ngurah Pamecutan (Cokorda Alit Ngurah I) (1861–1890) [son]
- Cokorda Alit Ngurah II (ruler (cokorda) 1890-1902) [son]
- Cokorda Made Agung (1902–1906) [brother]
- Dutch conquest of Badung 1906
- Cokorda Alit Ngurah III (of entire Badung 1929-1946; died 1965) [son of Cokorda Alit Ngurah II]
- Rulership goes to Pamecutan line 1946

== Rajas of Bangli ==
- Dewa Gede Tangkeban I (of Nyalian ?-1804)
- Dewa Rai (c. 1804-1815)
- Dewa Gede Tangkeban II (c. 1815-1833) [son of Dewa Gede Tangkeban I]
- Dewa Gede Tangkeban III (1833–1875) [son]
- Dewa Gede Oka (1875–1880) [son]
- Dewa Gede Ngurah (1881–1892) [brother]
- Dewa Gede Cekorda (1894–1911) [brother]
- Dewa Gede Rai (regent 1913-1925) [brother]
- Dewa Gede Taman (regent 1925-1930) [grandson of Dewa Gede Tangkaban III]
- Dewa Putu Bukian (caretaker 1930-1931) [grandson of Dewa Gede Tangkaban III]
- Anak Agung Ketut Ngurah (ruler (anak agung) 1931-1950, kepala 1950-1960; died 1961) [son of Dewa Gede Cekorda]
- Bangli is included in the Indonesian unitary state 1950

== See also ==
- History of Bali
- Gelgel, Indonesia
- Dewa Agung
- Dalem (Raja)
- Klungkung Palace

== Bibliography ==
- C. C. Berg, De middeljavaansche historische traditie. Santpoort 1927.
- A. J. Bernet Kempers, Monumental Bali; Introduction to Balinese Archaeology & Guide to the Monuments. Berkeley & Singapore 1991. ISBN 0-945971-16-8.
- Helen Creese, 'Balinese babad as historical sources; A reinterpretation of the fall of Gelgel', Bijdragen tot de Taal-, Land- en Volkenkunde 147 1991.
- A. A. Gde Darta et al., Babad Arya Tabanan dan Ratu Tabanan. Denpasar 1996. ISBN 979-649-021-8.
- Mahaudiana, Babad Manggis Gianyar. Gianyar 1968.
- S. O. Robson, 'The Ancient Capital of Bali', Archipel 16 1978.
- Henk Schulte Nordholt, Macht, mensen en middelen; Patronen en dynamiek in de Balische politiek ca. 1700-1840. Doctoraalscriptie, Amsterdam 1980.
- Henk Schulte Nordholt, The Spell of Power; A History of Balinese Politics. Leiden 1996. ISBN 90-6718-090-4.
- I. Nyoman Suada et al., Selayang Pandang Tokoh-Tokoh Puri Agung Kesiman (Abad XIX-XX). Denpasar 1999.
- Anak Agung A. Sudira, Mengenal Kawitan Warga Mahagotra Tirtha Arum. Denpasar 1992.
- Truhart P., Regents of Nations. Systematic Chronology of States and Their Political Representatives in Past and Present. A Biographical Reference Book, Part 3: Asia & Pacific Oceania, München 2003, s. 1239-1244, ISBN 3-598-21545-2.
- Adrian Vickers, The Desiring Prince; A Study of the Kidung Malat as Text. PhD Thesis Sydney 1986.
- Margaret J. Wiener. Visible and Invisible Realms; Power, Magic, and Colonial Conquest in Bali. Chicago & London 1995. ISBN 0-226-88580-1.
