= Ragajaya =

Balinese king who reigned in mid 12th century

Çri Maharaja Çri Ragajaya was a Balinese king who ruled in the middle of the 12th century CE. The territory of his kingdom most likely covered only the areas north of Lake Batur (North Bali) and East Bali, mainly from Tejakula in Buleleng Regency to Bugbug in Karangasem Regency. The king's name is mentioned on the Tejakula inscription, dated to 1077 Saka (or 1155 CE). In the inscription, the king appointed the village of Sabhaya to do the jataka (tax-free land) for the benefit of a sacred temple, which was named the Bhatara ri Kunjarasana. In return, the villagers were granted various rights for the obligations they had to do.

King Ragajaya is estimated to reign after King Jayasakti (1133-1150 AD), and before King Jayapangus (1178–1181 AD). The statutes used during his time were called Uttara Widdhi Balawan and Raja Wacana (also called Raja Niti), which had been used since Queen Sakalendukirana's time at the end of the 11th century.

== See also ==
- Bali Kingdom
- List of monarchs of Bali
