= Bedulu =

Historical site in Bali, Indonesia

Coordinates: 8°31′S 115°18′E

Bedulu, also spelt Bedahulu or Bedaulu, is a historical site in Bali, Indonesia. It is situated about two kilometres west of the present-day town of Gianyar.

== History ==
According to Balinese historical tradition, Bedulu was once the royal capital of a great kingdom of Bedahulu. The Dalem Bedaulu ruled the Pejeng dynasty from here, and was the last Balinese king to withstand the onslaught of the powerful Javanese Majapahit, led by Gajah Mada back in 1343. After Majapahit campaign, the seat of Balinese court under Majapahit was shifted to nearby Samprangan.

== Archaeology ==
As the ancient royal court, there are numbers of archaeological sites found in and around Bedulu. One of the most important is the cave temples and ritual bathing pool of Goa Gajah, Yeh Pulu bas-reliefs carved upon cliffs, and Pura Samuan Tiga Hindu Balinese temple. The Gedong Arca Museum is located there.

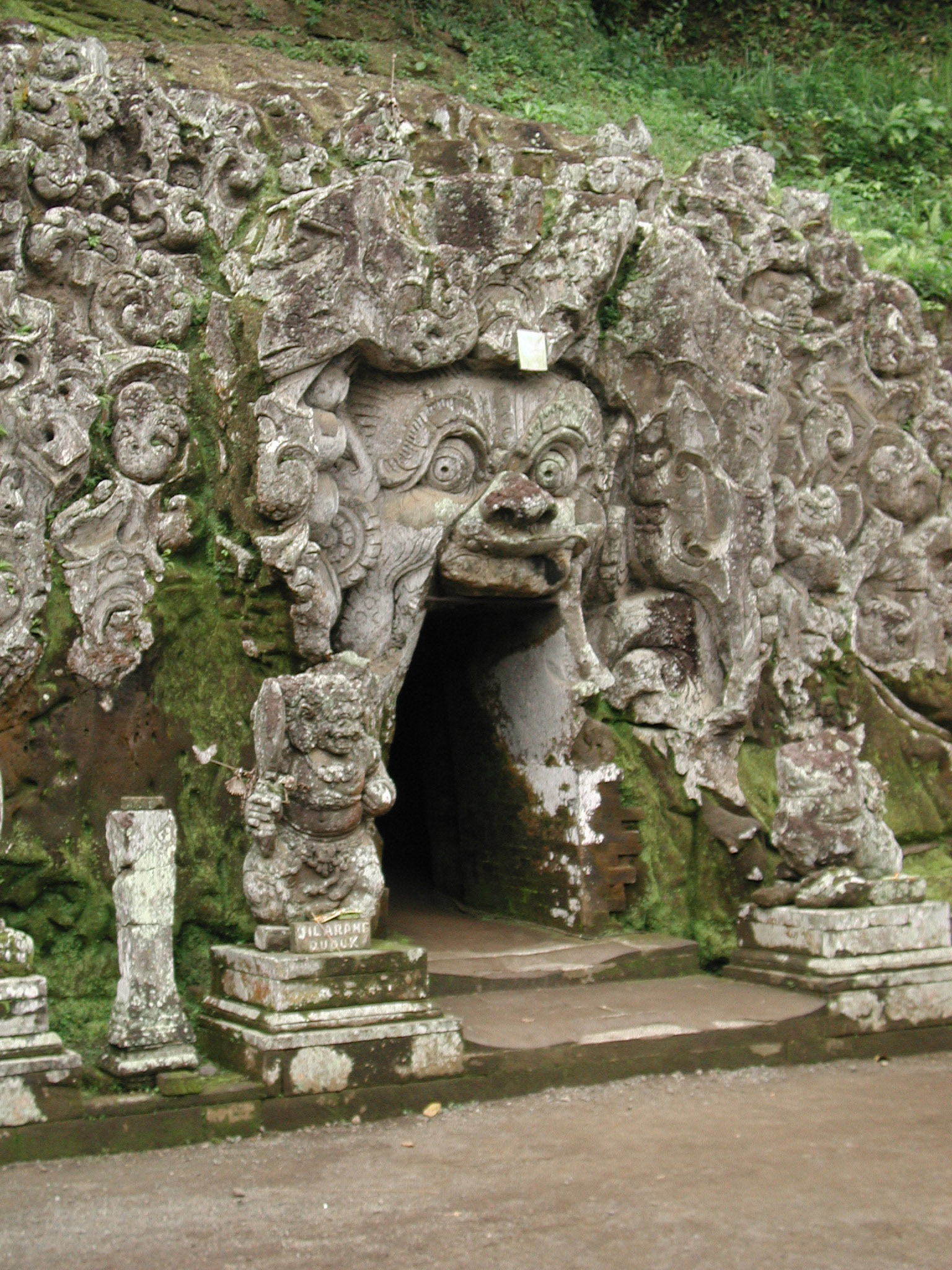
Entrance to the 'Elephant Cave'/Goa Gajah
