= Balinese Kshatriya =

Balinese Kshatriya is a Hindu Kshatriya community that exists on the island of Bali in Indonesia. During the second half of the sixth century, Bali had a strong Kshatriya ruling dynasty. The rulers were mostly indigenous Balinese with some Indian blood. These clans mostly belonged to the Nāgavanshi dynasty. However, in due time, these indigenous Kshatriyas became extinct and were replaced by the Javanese Mahisha Kshatriyas who immigrated to Bali. Most of the Kshatriyas now living in Bali are claimed to be the descendants of King Dewa Agung, who immigrated to Bali from Java. However, there are also a few other Kshatriya clans who were elevated to the Kshatriya status from the Vaishya varna. Altogether, Mahisha Kshatriyas constitute around 4% of the total Balinese Hindu population.

Dewa Agung is believed to have crossed over to Bali from Java many centuries ago, along with his half-brother Arya Damar and six other Kshatriyas. However, only Dewa Agung retained his Kshatriya status, as the descendants of the other seven were degraded to the status of Vaishya. Most of the Kshatriyas belonging to the Dewa Agung clan are located in Badung, Tabanan, Mengwi and Karangasem. However, in Badung, there is another Kshatriya clan named Gusti Pam'chuttan, who are descended from the Raja Ngurah Sakti Pamecutan. Kshatriyas are also found in Klungkung, Bangli, and Gianyar. The Kshatriya clan which lived in Buleleng has now shifted their location to Badung. Other Kshatriya clans who live in Bali, such as Desak, Pradeva, and Pungakan, are of questionable origin.

The word Kshatriya, which is of Sanskrit origin, is pronounced as Satria in the Balinese language.
