= Javanese Kshatriya =

Hindu Kshatriya community in Indonesia

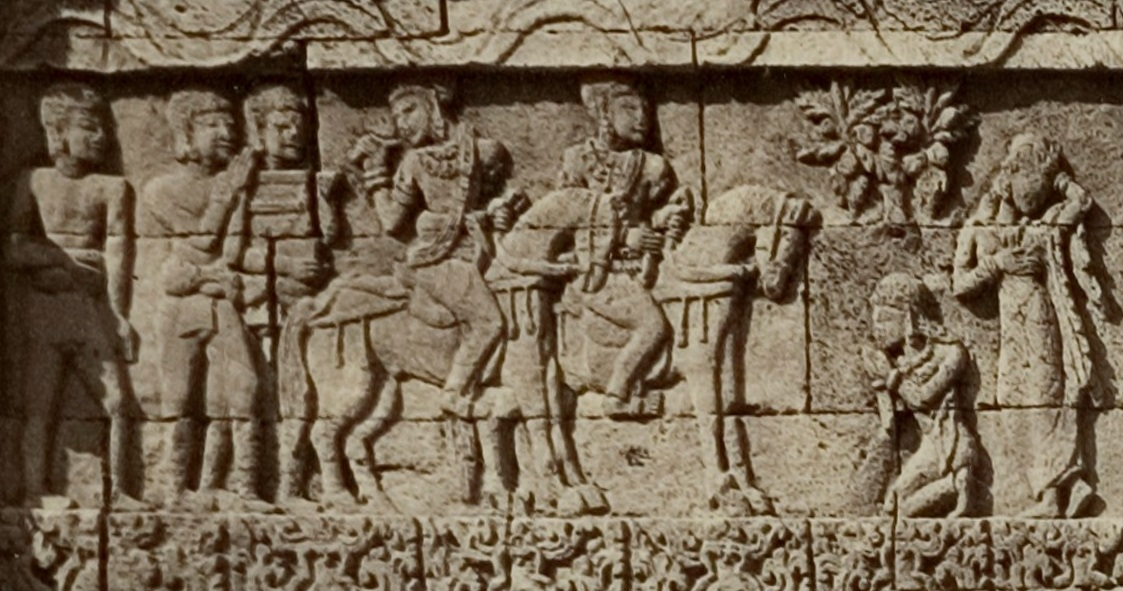
Knights and their retainer, as depicted in the Penataran temple.

Javanese Kshatriya were a Hindu Kshatriya community which originally existed in the island of Java in Indonesia. According to the ancient Hindu law, the Kshatriyas have the exclusive right to bear arms in order to defend the country. Indigenous Kshatriya communities currently exist in India, Nepal, Bangladesh, Pakistan, Sri Lanka, Vietnam as well as in the island of Bali in Indonesia.

Most prominent of the Kshatriya clans in Java were those located in Koripan, Gaglang, Kediri, and Janggala. The literary work Rangga Lawe describes in detail about the Kshatriyas and Vaishyas of the Kediri royal palace. Jawa or Kediri was the largest Hindu kingdom, which was ruled by Kshatriyas in the island.

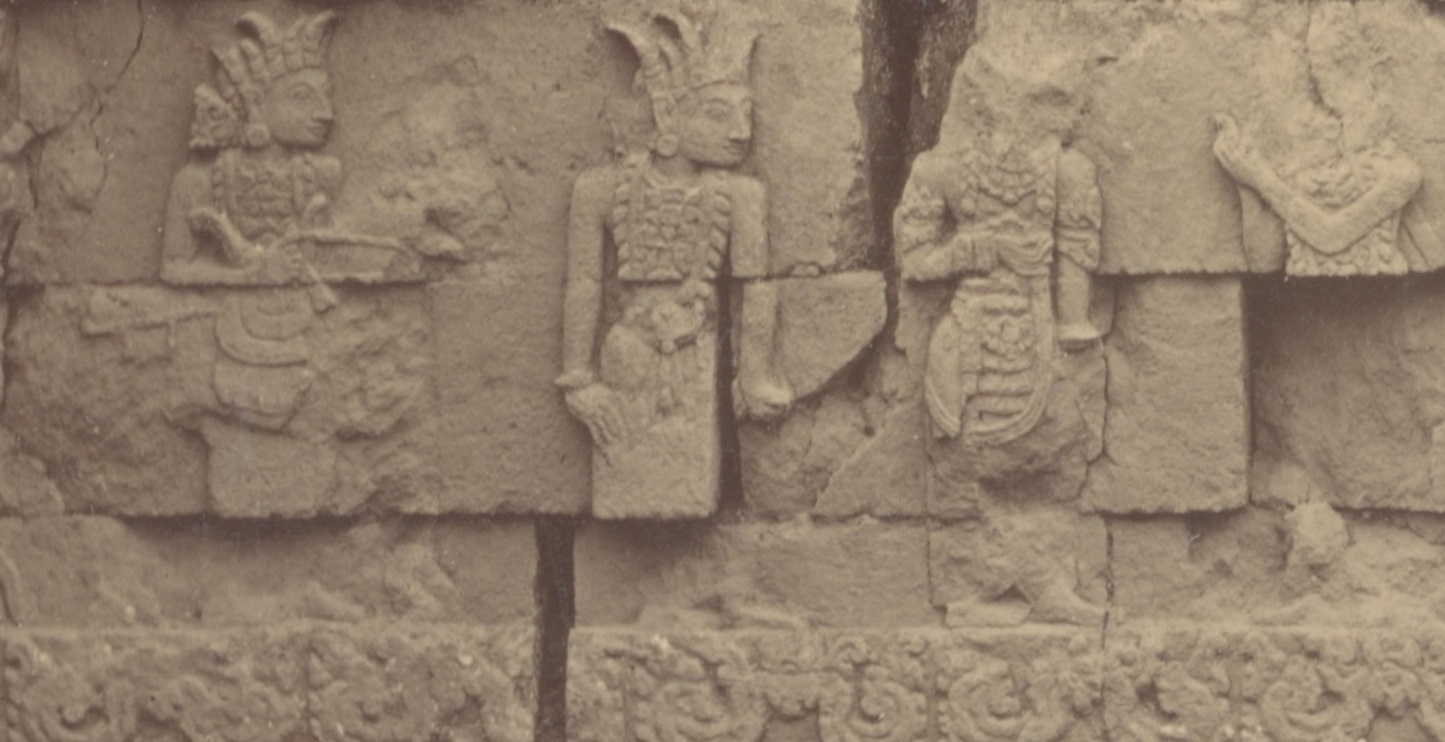
An armored horse rider, two armored warriors, and a noble figure. From Penataran temple, ca. 1347.

Javanese Kshatriyas were popularly known as K'bo or Mahishya (meaning buffalo) and Rangga to indicate their strength. The Kshatriyas came to Java in small numbers, but most of the princes were of the third caste, the wesya (Vaishya). Most important of the Kshatriya families in Java were Mahishya Bungalan, K'bo Wilalungan, K'bo Siluman, K'bo Jerang, K'bo Kanigara, K'bo Chaluk, K'bo T'ki, K'bo Taluktak, Ki Mahisa Safati, K'bo Mundarang, and further Rangga Smi, Rangga Mayang, Rangga Palana, Rangga Ralengsong, Rangga Pasung, Rangga Wirada, Rangga Rabete, Rangga Sumbi, Rangga Sampana, and Anurangga Sunting. Some of these Kshatriya clans migrated to the island of Bali as well. The royal family of Deva Agung, who is considered to be the ancestor of almost all the Kshatriyas in Bali, was originally a Mahishya Kshatriya from Java.

The Javanese Kshatriyas became extinct during the early 17th century as a result of constant warfare with political rivals after the decline of Majapahit. No descendants remain of this community now, except those in Bali who claim ancestry from Dewa Agung.

== See also ==
- Balinese Kshatriya
