= Arjayadengjayaketana =

Queen of Bali

Queen of Bali
- Reign: c. 1200
- Predecessor: King Jayapangus
- Successor: King Bhatara Guru Śri Adikuntiketana
- Co-ruler: King Haji Ekajayalancana
- Issue: King Haji Ekajayalancana
- Dynasty: Warmadewa dynasty
- Father: Jayapangus?

Queen Arjayadengjayaketana of Bali (also Arjaya Deng Jayaketana) was a ruler of that island c. 1181-1200 CE.

She was a member of Jaya Dynasty (Warmadewa dynasty) and successor of King Jayapangus, who may have been her father.

She was the mother of King Haji Ekajayalancana and co-ruled with him.

She and her son were succeeded by King Bhatara Guru Śri Adikuntiketana.
