= Dalem Samprangan =

King of Bali from Kepakisan Dynasty

Sri Aji Agra Samprangan Kepakisan
- Ida Dalem Aji Sri Agra Samprangan Kepakisan; Ida Dalem Hile Samprangan; Ida Dalem Samprangan
- Reign: 1303 – 1306 Saka (1381 – 1384 AD)
- Predecessor: Sri Aji Kresna Kepakisan
- Successor: Sri Aji Smara Kepakisan (Dalem Ketut Ngulesir)
- Burial: Enshrined in a nine-tiered Meru at Pura Pedharman Sri Aji Kresna Kepakisan
- Spouse: Dewi Ayu Besuki
- Issue: Dewa Ayu Muter
- Dynasty: Kepakisan
- Father: Sri Aji Kresna Kepakisan
- Mother: Ni Gusti Ayu Tirta Gajah Para
- Religion: Hindu - Buddhist

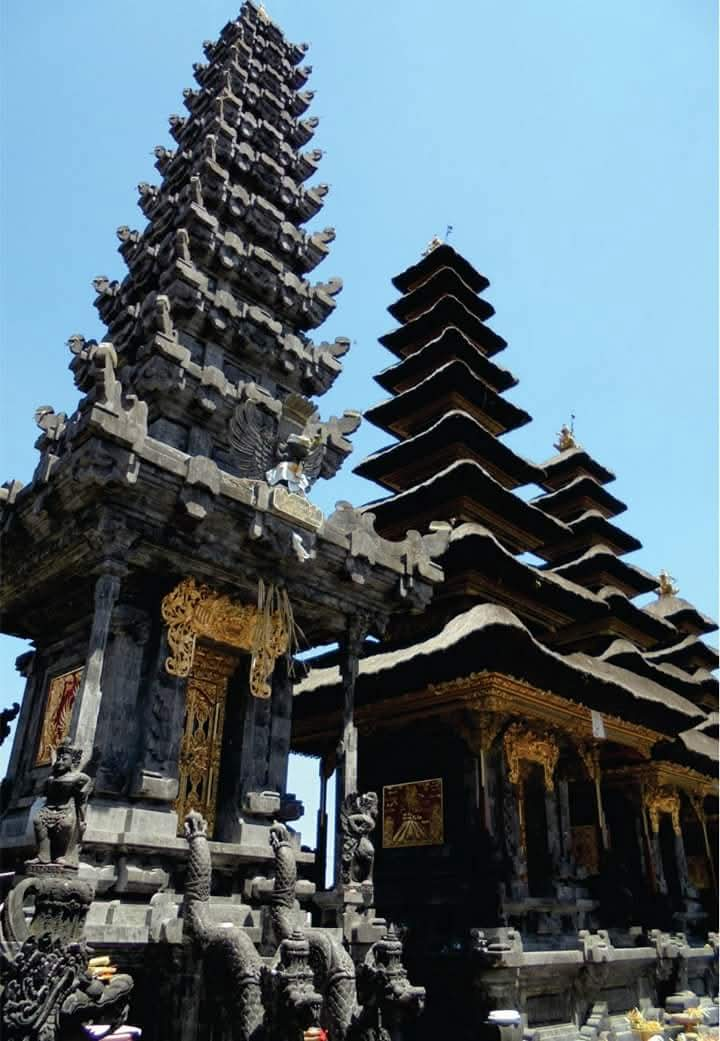
Meru Pedharman Sri Aji Kresna Kepakisan

Ida Dalem Agra Samprangan, also known as Sri Aji Agra Samprangan Kepakisan, was the second King from the Kepakisan dynasty who ruled the island of Bali from 1381 to 1384 AD (1303 - 1306 Saka), under the sovereignty of the Majapahit Empire. He was the heir to the throne of the Kingdom of Samprangan after his father, Sri Aji Kresna Kepakisan, and reigned for 3 years before being deposed by his ministers, led by Ki Gusti Ngurah Klapodyana, due to neglecting his governmental duties. The throne was then succeeded by his younger brother, I Dewa Agung Angulesir, who later held the title Sri Aji Semara Kepakisan.

== Early history ==
In the book "Sejarah Bali Dari Prasejarah Hingga Modern" written by Ardika et al. (2018:272), it is stated: “King Sri Aji Dalem Kresna Kepakisan had two consort wives, namely I Gusti Ayu Raras or Ni Gusti Ayu Tirta (daughter of Arya Gajah Para) and Ni Gusti Ayu Kutawaringin (sister of Arya Kebon Tubuh). From the first wife, he had three sons and one daughter: I Dewa Agung Samprangan, known for his fondness for grooming and lack of interest in ruling, was thus referred to as Dalem Ile when he became king. The second son, I Dewa Agung Tarukan, was not interested in becoming king as he aspired to fulfill the dharma of a sage (priest); later, due to an event, he left his puri in Gelgel. The third child, a daughter named Ni Dewa Ayu Swabawa, and the fourth, I Dewa Agung Ketut Ngulesir, enjoyed traveling and adventure, liked gambling, and did not feel at home in the palace. Meanwhile, from the second wife, he had a very young son named I Dewa Tegal Besung, who was very close to I Dewa Agung Samprangan.”

== Reign ==
According to the chronicle Babad Dalem, after the death of Sri Aji Kresna Kepakisan in 1380 AD (1303 Saka), I Dewa Agung Samprangan, as crown prince, succeeded his father and was crowned king in 1381 AD with the title Sri Aji Agra Samprangan Kepakisan and took residence at Puri Agung Linggarsapura in Samprangan. He is estimated to have ruled for a short period of about 3 years.

He is recorded to have had only one daughter named Ni Dewa Ayu Muter, born of a queen consort named Dewi Ayu Besuki. They met at Pura Agung Besakih while Dalem Samprangan was inspecting the renovation of several temple buildings there.

History records that during his reign, although the Kingdom of Bali was stable economically and politically, he was characterized as an incompetent ruler. He spent much of his time with his queen consort and focused on improving his appearance, so he was sometimes known as Ida Dalem Hile (fond of grooming). As a result, he often neglected governance, leaving priests and high-ranking officials waiting in the council chamber. This behavior frustrated the elders of the kingdom. Eventually, one of the ministers of the Kingdom of Bali, Ki Gusti Kubon Klapa, the son of Sira Arya Kutawaringin, gathered the kingdom's high officials at Pura Dalem Tugu Gelgel and initiated the deposition of Dalem Samprangan from the throne, then asked Dalem Samprangan’s younger siblings to take his place as king.

He left the palace and sought help from I Dewa Agung Tarukan in Pejeng. However, due to conflicts with his older brother, he left his palace and chose to live among the Balinese people as a commoner. He also declared that he would not reclaim the throne, as he wished to pursue spiritual knowledge. Eventually, Dalem Samprangan’s youngest brother, I Dewa Agung Ketut Ngulesir—a notorious gambler who was found adventuring in the village of Pandak, Tabanan—was asked to become king in his brother's place. He was persuaded to accept the royal title and was offered residence in Gelgel, an ancient village in what is now Klungkung, near the southern coast.

As a result, the government in Samprangan quickly fell into obscurity, while the kingdom’s officials moved to Gelgel, which rose in status as the political center of Bali under the new king Dalem Ketut, and remained so until the Maruti Rebellion in 1651 AD.

== Later Life and Dalem Samprangan's Siblings ==
According to the Babad Dalem, after being unilaterally deposed by the royal officials, Dalem Samprangan was still granted the right to govern the former capital and resided at Puri Agung Lingarsapura, accompanied by his half-brother I Dewa Tegal Besung. There are no detailed records about the end of Dalem Samprangan's life, but it is estimated that he lived to an old age. After Dalem Samprangan's death, I Dewa Tegal Besung went to Gelgel and acted as a co-regent.

=== Dewa Tarukan ===
In the chronicle Babad Pulasari, it is told that Dalem Samprangan’s brother, Dalem Tarukan, resided in Pejeng, near present-day Ubud. He was involved in a conflict with his brother, which resulted in a series of civil wars on the island, and he lived in exile as a commoner. Eventually, Dalem Tarukan was defeated, and his descendants were stripped of their noble titles from the Ksatria caste. His children and descendants later spread to various villages in Bali.

== Death ==
Sri Aji Agra Samprangan died in old age, accompanied only by his half-brother I Dewa Agung Tegal Besung, to whom he bequeathed his palace, as he had no male heir.

There are no detailed records regarding the death or the cause of death of Dalem Samprangan. After the funeral rites were performed, he was deified at the nine-tiered Meru shrine at Pura Pedharman Sri Aji Kresna Kepakisan, located within the Pura Agung Besakih complex.

== See also ==
- History of Bali
- List of monarchs of Bali

Preceded by Sri Aji Kresna Kepakisan	King of Bali; 1381 - 1384	Succeeded by Dalem Ketut
