= Śri Maharaja Walaprabhu =

Śri Maharaja Walaprabhu was the king of Bali between 1079 and 1088.

Preceded by Anak Wungsu	Balinese Monarchs; 1079-1088	Succeeded by Śri Maharaja
