= Gusti Ayu Karang =

Gusti Ayu Karang was a regent in the Kingdom of Klungkung (Indonesia) from 1809 to 1814.

Her home kingdom was the Kingdom of Karangasem. She was the mother of Dewa Agung Istri Kanya, whose father was her co-regent Dewa Agung Putra I. She invented new conditions for Dewa Agung Istri Kanya to become the "Virgin Queen of Klungkung."
