= Dalem Ketut =

King of Bali from Kepakisan Dynasty

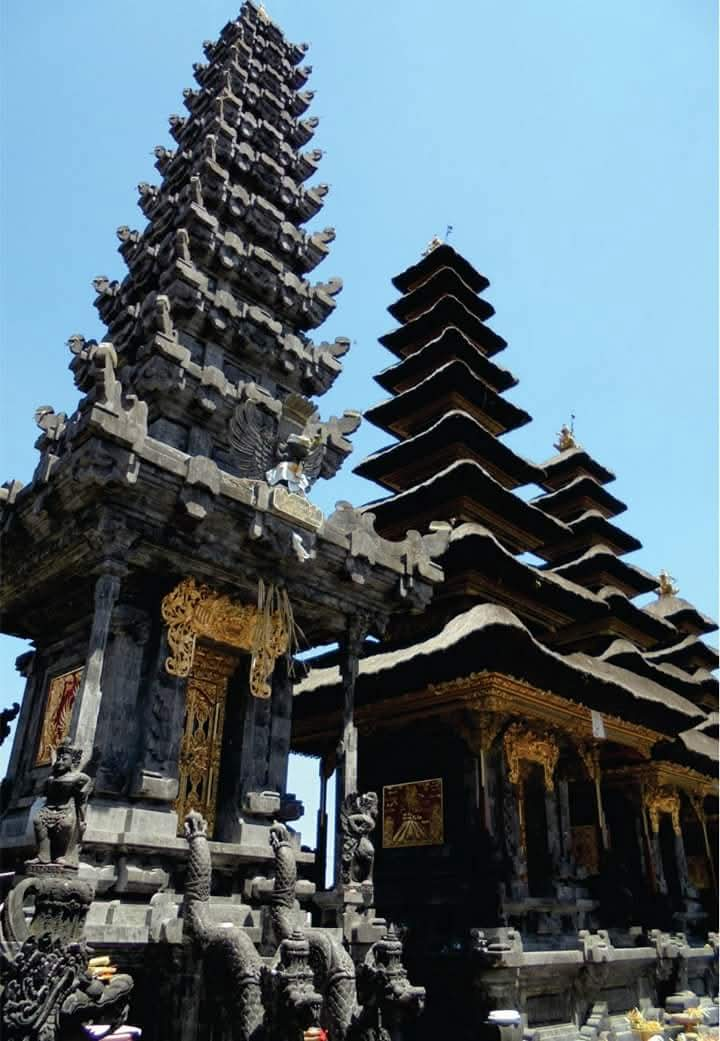
Meru Pedharman Sri Aji Kresna Kepakisan

Ida Dalem Ketut Ngulesir also known as Ida Dalem Sri Smara Giri Kepakisan or Sri Aji Smara Kepakisan was the third King of Bali who reigned from 1383 until 1460.

== See also ==
- History of Bali
- List of monarchs of Bali
- Gelgel, Indonesia

| Preceded by Dalem Samprangan | King of Bali; 1383 - 1460 | Succeeded by Dalem Baturenggong |
