= Goa Gajah =

Hindu temple in Indonesia

Coordinates: 8°31′24.20″S 115°17′10.89″E

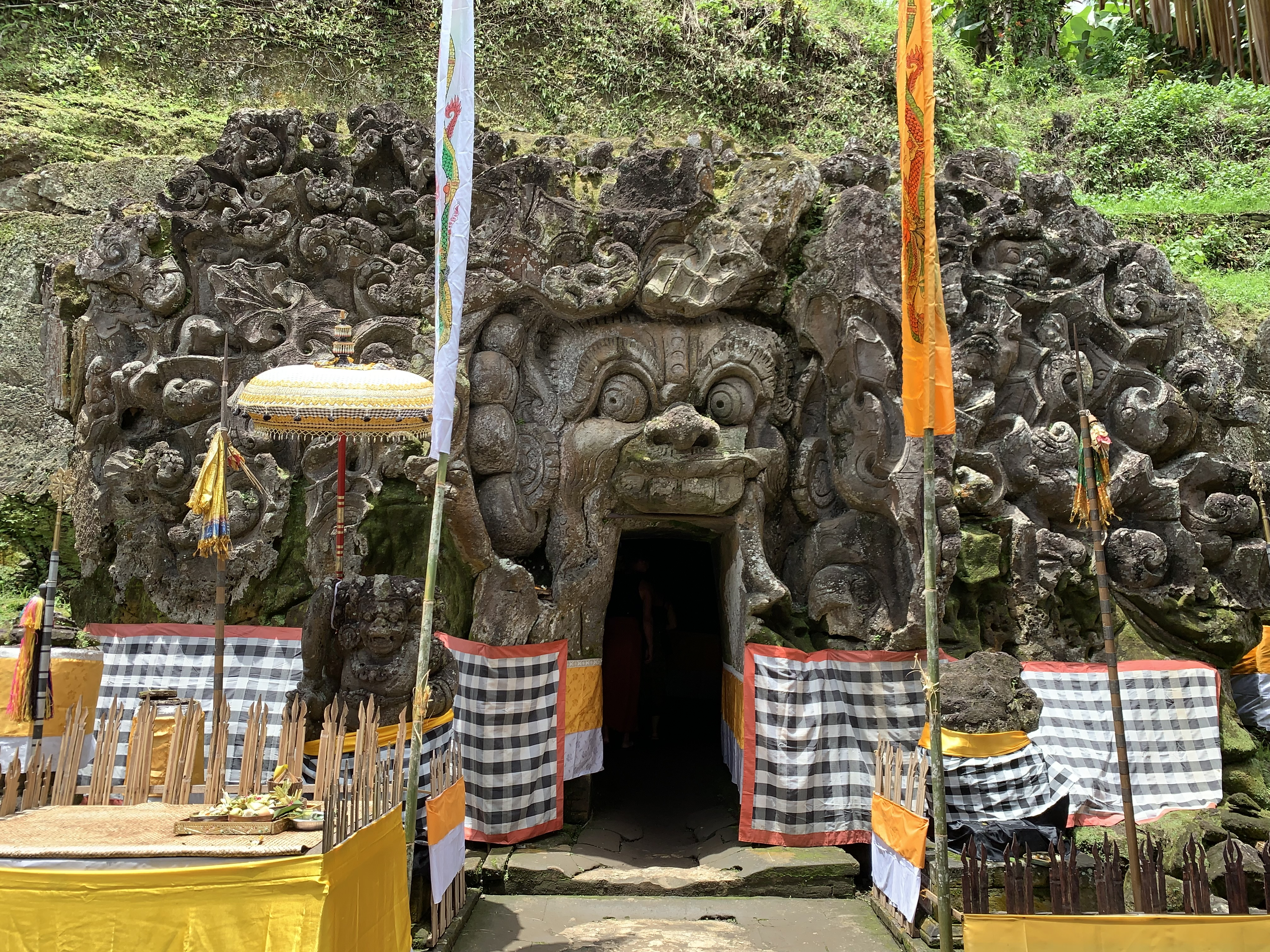
Entrance to the cave of Goa Gajah

Idol of Ganesha inside the cave of Goa Gajah

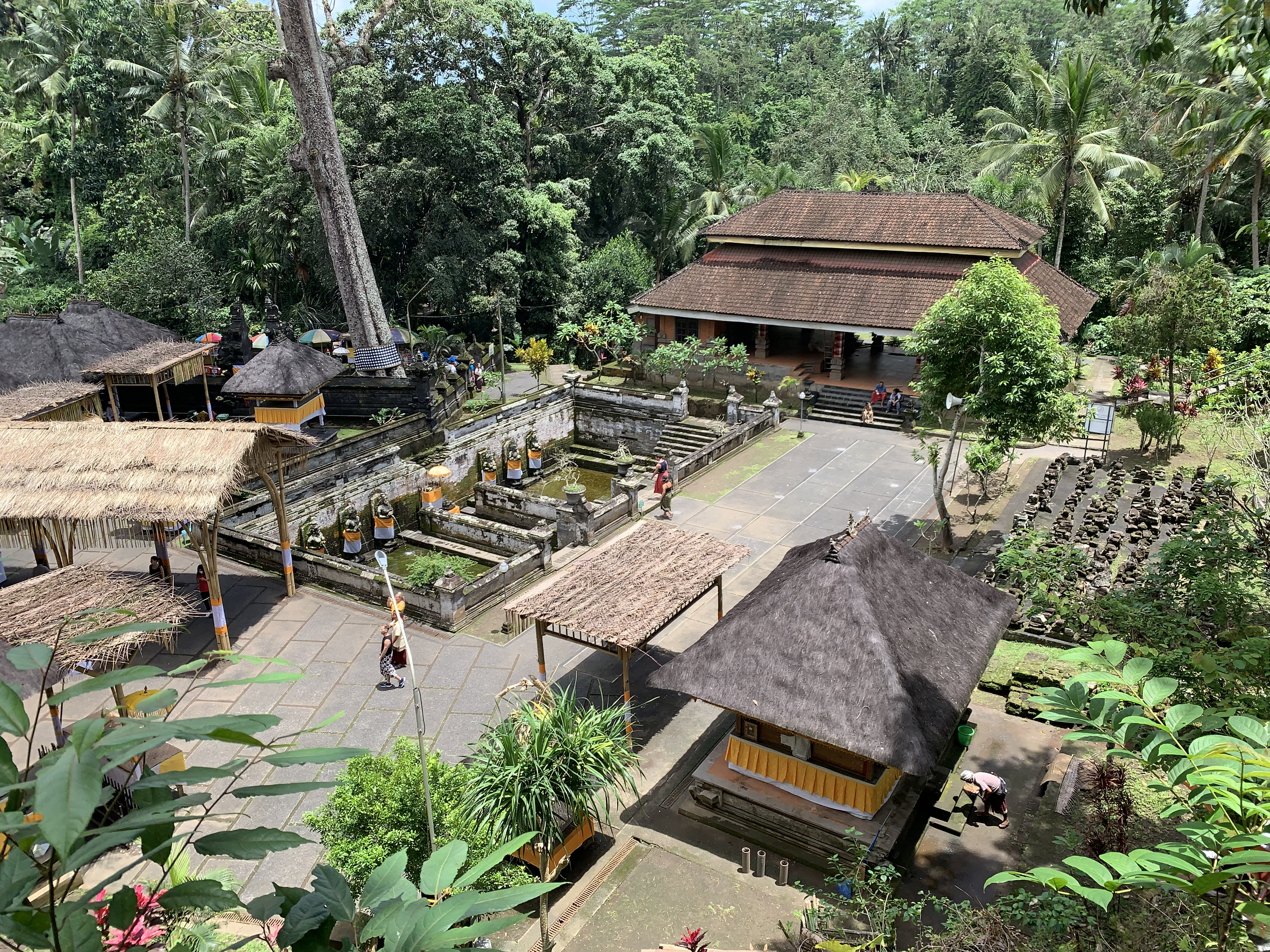
Overview of the structures in Goa Gajah complex

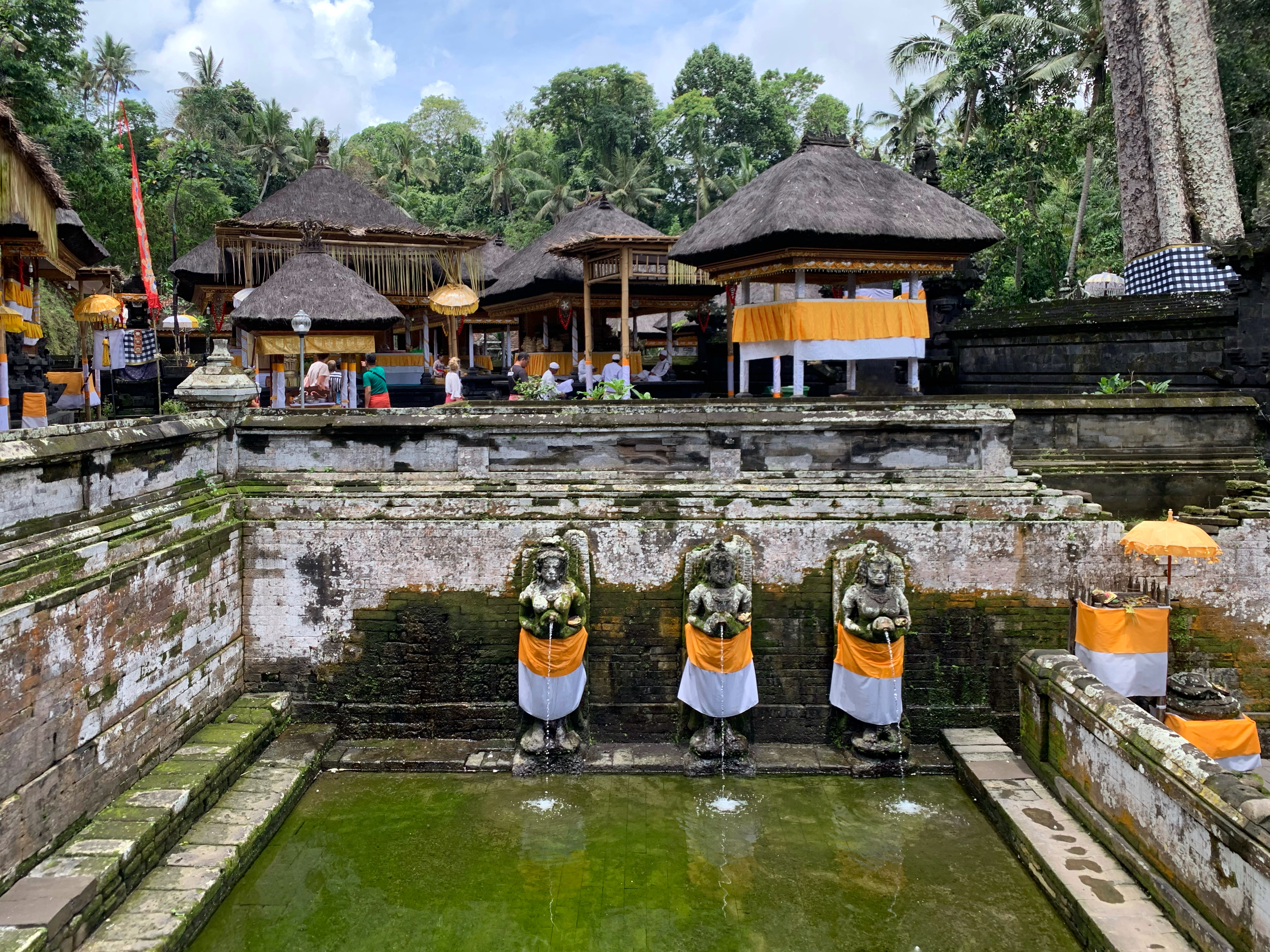
Temple tank of Goa Gajah

Goa Gajah (Balinese: ᬕᭀᬯᬕᬚᬄ), lit. meaning "The Elephant Cave", is located in Gianyar on the island of Bali near Ubud, in Indonesia. Built in the 9th century, it served as a sanctuary.

== History ==
Although the exact origins of the cave are uncertain, it is believed to have been built as a place for spiritual meditation. One folklore relates that it was created by the fingernail of the legendary giant Kebo Iwa. However, examining its style, the sanctuary was probably dated from the 11th century Bali Kingdom. The complex contains both Hindu and Buddhist imagery, as the cave contains lingam and yoni, symbols of Shiva, and the image of Ganesha, while by the river there are carved images of stupas and chattra, imagery of Buddhism.

The cave was rediscovered by Dutch archaeologists in 1923, but the fountains and bathing pool were not discovered until 1954.

== Site description ==
The temple is characterized by menacing faces that are carved into the stone – whose purpose is assumed to be the warding off of evil spirits. The primary figure was once thought to be an elephant, hence the nickname Elephant Cave. Other sources state that it is named after the stone statue of the Hindu God Ganesh (characterized by having the head of an elephant) located inside of the temple. The site is mentioned in the Javanese poem Desawarnana written in 1365. An extensive bathing place on the site was not excavated until the 1950s. The entrance of the cave is accessed only by walking down a long flight of stairs. The inside of the temple is small and usually has trails of white smoke from the incense burning. Visitors wearing shorts will be issued a sarong to tie around the waist before entering the courtyard. The complex also contains 7 statues of women (out of which 1 has been destroyed due to an earthquake) holding water pitchers that depict seven holy rivers of India: the Ganga River, Sarasvati River, Yamuna River, Godavari River, Sindhu River, Kaveri River, and Narmada River.

== World Heritage Status ==
This site was added to the UNESCO World Heritage Tentative List on October 19, 1995, in the Cultural category, but was pulled out along with 11 other sites on 2015.
