= Śri Maharaja Sakalendukirana Laksmidhara Wijayottunggadewi =

11th century Queen regent of Bali

Śri Maharaja Sakalendukirana Laksmidhara Wijayottunggadewi was a queen regnant of Bali, who flourished from 1088 to 1101 CE.

She succeeded Sri Walaprabhu Saka in 1088. Her uncommonly long name has been assumed to describe her connection to the previous rulers and her connection to the divine.

She ordered the Nayakanjalan, and inscription which listed many rules of the Balinese society.

Preceded by Śri Maharaja Walaprabhu	Balinese Monarchs	Succeeded by Śri Suradhipa
