= Sri Aji Kresna Kepakisan =

King of Bali from Kepakisan Dynasty

- Ida Dalem Sri Aji Kresna Kepakisan; Ida Dalem Wawu Rauh; Ida Dalem Ketut Kresna Kepakisan
- Reign: 1274 - 1302 Śaka (1352 - 1380 AD)
- Predecessor: None (founder)
- Successor: Sri Aji Agra Samprangan Kepakisan (Dalem Samprangan)
- Burial: Enshrined in the eleven-tiered stone-roofed Meru at Pura Pedharman Sri Aji Kresna Kepakisan
- Spouse: Queens: Ni Gusti Ayu Tirta Gajah Para; Ni Gusti Ayu Kuta Waringin; Other wife: Ida Ayu Ketepeng Reges
- Issue: From the first queen: I Dewa Agung Agra Samprangan; I Dewa Agung Tarukan; Ni Dewa Agung Ayu Swarbhawa; I Dewa Agung Angulesir; From the second queen: I Dewa Agung Tegal Besung; From the Brahmani wife: Arya Tegeh Kuri
- Dynasty: Kepakisan
- Father: Sri Soma Wang Bang Kepakisan
- Religion: Hindu - Buddhist (possibly Vaishnava)

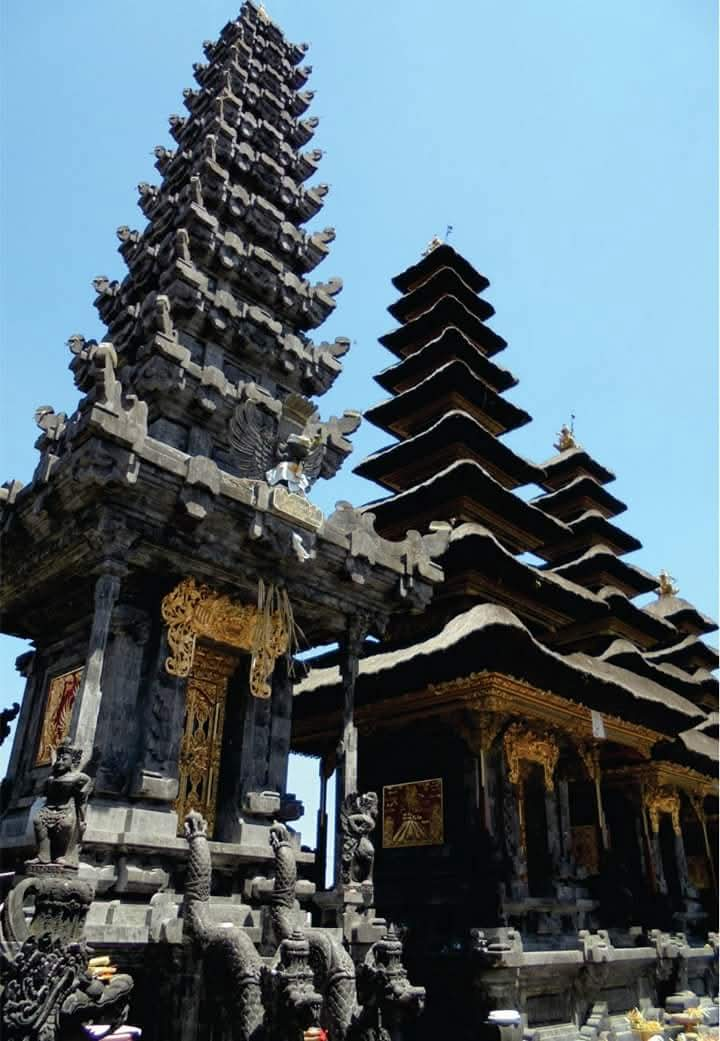
Meru Pedharman of Sri Aji Kresna Kepakisan

Sri Aji Kresna Kepakisan, also known as Ida Dalem Wawu Rauh or Ida Dalem Ketut Kresna Kepakisan, was a king and the founder of the Kepakisan Dynasty in Bali. He served as a vassal king under the Majapahit Empire and ruled the island of Bali from 1352 to 1380 AD. He was the son of Sri Wang Bang Kepakisan and the great-grandson of Mpu Tantular, the author of the Sutasoma text.

== Majapahit expedition to Bali ==
The arrival of Sri Aji Kresna Kepakisan as ruler in Bali cannot be separated from the political and military dynamics during the expansion of the Majapahit Kingdom into the eastern part of the archipelago. One of the targets of this expansion was the kingdom of Bali Bedahulu, which at that time was ruled by Sri Astasura Ratna Bumi Banten, also known in local tradition as Ida Dalem Bedahulu or Ida Dalem Bedamuka.

According to Javanese and Balinese traditional sources—especially the Negarakertagama, Babad Dalem, Babad Arya Tabanan, and local lontar manuscripts—it is agreed that the Majapahit military expedition to conquer Bali took place in the Saka year 1265 (1343 AD). The Majapahit troops were led by Kryan Patih Gajah Mada, with Arya Damar as his deputy, accompanied by many other noble warriors (Arya). However, before launching a full-scale invasion, Majapahit first neutralized Patih Kebo Iwa, the most powerful military figure in Bali at the time, along with Ki Pasung Grigis, who was considered the final stronghold of the Bedahulu Kingdom’s defense.

The attack was then launched simultaneously from various directions, and the Bali Bedahulu forces put up fierce resistance. The battle occurred on a large scale and resulted in heavy casualties. Eventually, Dalem Bedahulu was killed, and temporary control of the government was taken over by his uncle, Patih Agung Ki Pasung Grigis. After prolonged fighting, Ki Pasung Grigis surrendered in the village of Tengkulak and was later brought to Majapahit.

Following this victory, the political situation in Bali remained unstable. As a result, the Majapahit leadership, consisting of noble Arya figures, were assigned to settle in various strategic regions to maintain security and serve as temporary representatives of Majapahit's authority. This deployment marked the beginning of a new aristocratic elite in Bali. These Arya figures included:

- Arya Kenceng in Buahan (now Tabanan),
- Arya Kuta Waringin' in Gelgel,
- Arya Tan Wikan in Kaba-Kaba,
- Arya Bleteng in Penatih,
- Arya Kiyayi in Besakih,
- Arya Punta in Mambal,
- Arya Jurudeh in Temukti,
- Arya Kanuruhan in Tangkas,
- Kyai Malela Cengkrong in Jembrana and,
- Arya Sentong in Pacung.

== Rebellion of the Bali Aga and arrival from Majapahit ==
In the Babad Bali, Sri Aji Kresna Kepakisan was only appointed King of Bali in Saka year 1274 (1352 AD) after Majapahit succeeded in suppressing the rebellion of the Bali Aga tribe, led by Ki Tokawa, Ki Pasung Giri, and Ki Tunjung Tutur (1345 AD), as well as the rebellion of Ida Dalem Makambika (1347 AD), who was a descendant of the previous Bedahulu nobility. As a result of these rebellions, Majapahit sent two more military expeditions to Bali, led directly by Raden Cakradara Krtawardhana, Kryan Gajah Mada, and Arya Damar, and more Arya were then sent and assigned to maintain security in Bali, such as:

- Arya Gajah Para in Tianyar,
- Arya Getas in Tianyar, later assigned to Praya, Lombok,
- Ki Tan Kawur in Abiansemal,
- Ki Tan Kober in Pacung,
- Ki Tan Mundur in Cacaha,

As a monument of victory and complete domination over Bali, the Arya built an 11-tiered Meru at Pura Agung Kentel Gumi, which had previously been built by Mpu Kuturan in the 9th century AD. Even so, some groups in Bali were still dissatisfied with this policy, as they had not yet received a ruler who could unite the Arya nobility and the Bali Aga tribes. Ki Patih Ulung, together with Ki Padang Subadra, Ki Sangkulputih, Kyai Kepasekan, and Pemacekan, eventually went to Majapahit to request a king who could lead Bali.

Finally, their request was granted with the appointment of Sri Aji Kresna Kepakisan, son of a Brahmin from the Majapahit palace named Mpu Sri Soma Kepakisan. On the full moon of the month Kartikka, Saka year 1274 (October 4, 1352 AD), he was appointed and crowned as Raja Adipati along with his siblings:

- Sri Aji Bima Chili Kepakisan was appointed Adipati in Blambangan,
- Sri Aji Bima Sakti Kepakisan was appointed Adipati in Pasuruan,
- Sri Dyah Ayu Sukanya Kepakisan was sent to Sumbawa, and
- Sri Aji Kresna Kepakisan was appointed Adipati in Bali.

His departure to become Raja Adipati was accompanied by Majapahit officials and Arya nobles such as Arya Kresna Kepakisan, Arya Bang Pinatih, Arya Demung, Arya Tumenggung, Arya Delancang, Arya Manguri, Arya Pemecut Pemeregan, along with Brahmin priests Dang Hyang Jaya Rembat and Dang Hyang Subali, sailing on a Jong Jawa ship captained by Bendega Ki Samanjaya. The group landed at Alas Rangkan Beach (Pantai Lebih, Gianyar), near the southern coast.

He eventually established a palace at Samprangan, a former Majapahit military camp (close to the old capital of Bedahulu). His kingdom was known as the Kingdom of Samprangan with its capital at Linggarsapura. He was later known as Ida Dalem Sri Aji Kresna Kepakisan, or by the Balinese people as Ida Dalem Wawu Rauh (the newly arrived king).

== Arrival from Majapahit ==
According to a near-contemporary source, the poem Nagarakrtagama, Bali was subdued by the troops of Majapahit in 1343. In later Javanese and Balinese tradition, this conquest was retold in various versions. Babad Dalem, a chronicle from the 18th century, relates that Bali was in turmoil after the Majapahit invasion. In order to remedy this, the Patih (chief minister) Gajah Mada raised the Javanese nobleman Sri Aji Kresna Kepakisan as the vassal ruler of Bali. Sri Aji Kresna Kepakisan was the grandson of a Brahmin His mother was a spiritual being, an apsara. His two elder brothers were vassal princes of Blambangan and Pasuruan on Java. Sri Aji Kresna Kepakisan established his palace (puri) in Samprangan, in the Gianyar regency. With him went nine aristocrats from Java, who settled around the palace and assisted the ruler in his governance. Another grandee, Arya Gajah Para, settled at Tianyar on the north coast. However, the old population in the highland villages, the Bali Aga, violently resisted the rule of the Javanese immigrants. Their recalcitrance almost drove the king back to Java. Hearing about the trouble besetting his vassal, Gajah Mada sent a magic dagger (keris), Ki Lobar, to Samprangan. With its help, Sri Aji Kresna Kepakisan overcame all resistance. At his death he was succeeded by his son Dalem Samprangan, but the princely residence was short moved from Samprangan to Gelgel near the south coast.

== Death ==
Sri Aji Kresna Kepakisan, the king and founder of the Kepakisan Dynasty in Bali, ruled the Kingdom of Bali under the suzerainty of Majapahit for 28 years. His reign began with his coronation on ri pùrnnna ning kàrttika çaka yogan muni kang nètra dè ning bhaskara (4 October 1352 AD), and he died in 1380 AD. There are no historical records detailing the cause of his death. However, local sources mention that his funeral was conducted with the grandeur befitting a great king, in recognition of his significant contributions to preserving and upholding the indigenous Balinese customs and culture.

He is now deified at Pura Pedharman Sri Aji Kresna Kepakisan, located within the Pura Agung Besakih temple complex, housed in an eleven-tiered Meru shrine roofed with stone. His ancestral temple (Pura Kawitan) is situated at the site of his former palace in the village of Samprangan, Gianyar, where he once ruled. The royal throne was succeeded by his eldest son, I Dewa Agung Agra Samprangan, who later bore the title Sri Aji Agra Samprangan Kepakisan, also known as "Dalem Samprangan".

== Family ==
Dalem Kresna Kepakisan is recorded to have had five children with his queen consort—four sons and one daughter. He also had a son from a wife of Brahmin descent; however, due to certain circumstances, this child was later adopted by Sira Arya Kenceng, the Duke of Pucangan (present-day Tabanan).

A geographical text by Manuel Godinho de Erédia, a Portuguese explorer, dated to the year 1600, confirms that the kings of Bali were originally descended from East Java.

== See also ==
- History of Bali
- Hinduism in Indonesia
- List of monarchs of Bali

Preceded by Astasuraratna Bumi Banten	King of Bali; 1352 - 1380	Succeeded by Dalem Samprangan
