= Dalem (Raja) =

Dalem was a title for the kings of Bali who resided in Samprangan and Gelgel and were descended from the founder-raja Sri Aji Kresna Kepakisan (mid-14th century?). These kings ruled the island, or at least substantial parts thereof, from maybe the 14th century to the second half of the 17th century. The title literally means "inside" (the Indonesian word dalam has the same meaning), and alludes to his ritual-symbolic role inside the palace (puri). The title is first found in a Dutch report from 1619, which says that the Radia Dalam (Raja Dalem) was the paramount ruler of 33 lesser Balinese lords. The title is used in the chronicle Babad Dalem from the 18th century, which recounts the history of the kings of Bali up the end of the 17th century. After the fall of the Gelgel kingdom in 1686, a daughter kingdom was established in nearby Klungkung. However, the rulers of the Klungkung Palace were usually known by another title, Dewa Agung. In the literature, Dewa Agung is sometimes, although anachronistically, used also for the pre-1686 kings of Bali.

== See also ==
- History of Bali
- List of monarchs of Bali
- Gelgel, Indonesia
