= Jayasakti =

Jayasakti (r. 1146–51) was a king of Bali. He is known through his copper plate inscriptions, especially the Prasasti Desa Depaa.

He was a descendant of the famous ruler Airlangga.

== See also ==
- History of Bali
