= Jayapangus =

King of Bali

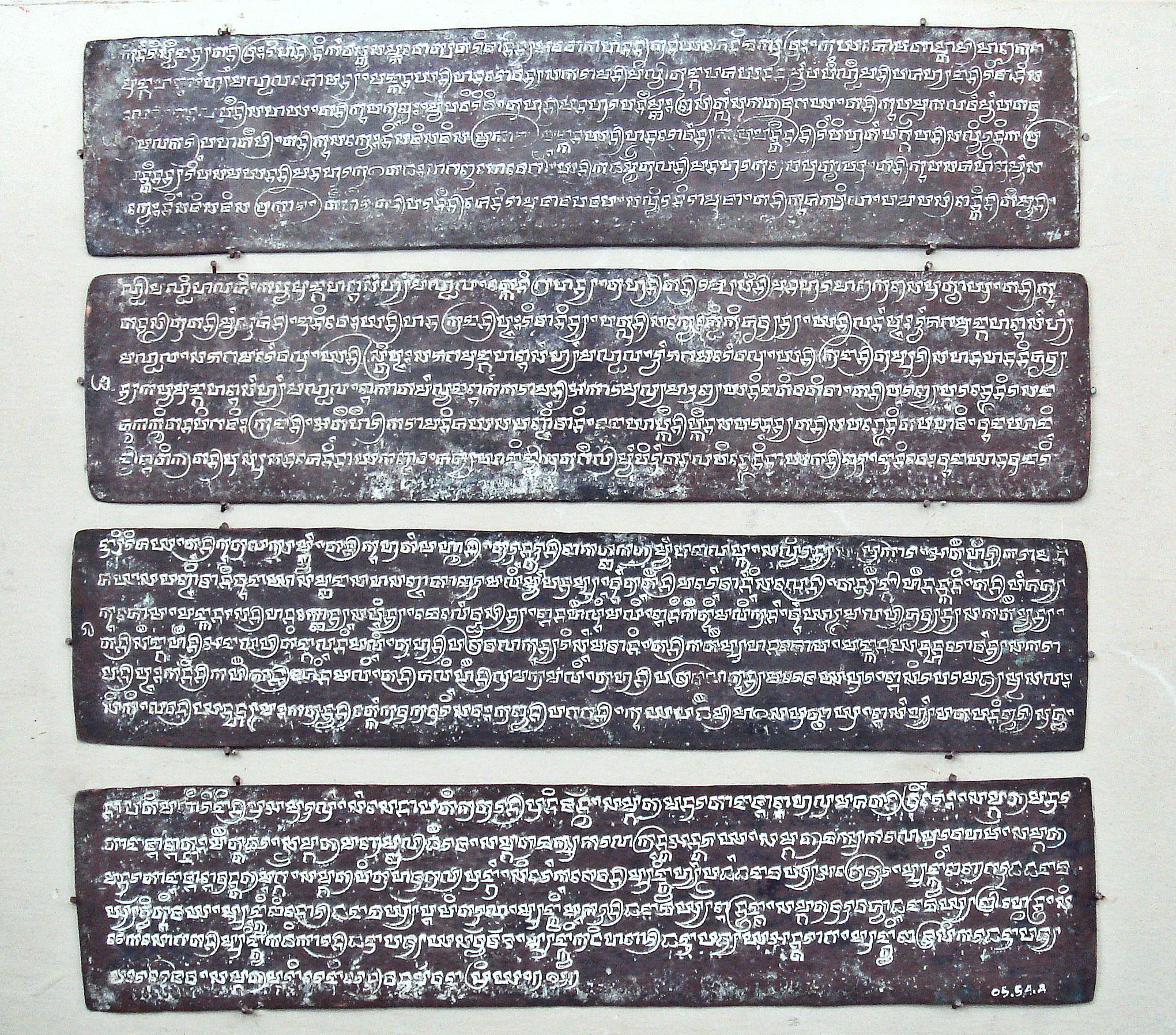
Copper plate inscriptions of king Jayapangus, regarding the village border in Kintamani, Bangli, Old Balinese script, Bali, 12th century. Bali Museum.

Jayapangus (r. 1178–81) was a king of Bali. He is known through his inscriptions, some of them related to taxes. During his reign, trading relations with China rose significantly. He is remembered today in Balinese culture in the Barong Landung mask dance.

== Biography ==
King Jayapangus, who was given the title Pāduka Śri Māhāraja Aji Jayapangus Arkaja Cihna/Lañcana, was a king who ruled Ancient Bali and became a symbol of ethnic harmony and cultural assimilation, such as Bali and the Chinese at that time, so that Bali was safe and peaceful in his time.

He was a descendant of the famous ruler Airlangga.

Jayapangus was maybe a father of Queen Arjayadengjayaketana. He was her predecessor.

King Jayapangus reigned for quite a long time. He was a great King who was very prominent among the Kings of the ancient Balinese era. King Jayapangus issued 43 inscriptions within three years.The Oldest of these inscriptions is the Mantring A inscription which is dated 1099 Saka (1178 CE) and the rest of which is dated around 1103 Saka (1181 CE).

Jayapangus is known as the savior of the country because he invited his people to return to religious ceremonies so that they received revelations (known as Galungan Day). During his reign, Bali's security was guaranteed and Hindu teachings developed rapidly. King Jayapangus reigned from Saka 1099(1178 AD/CE) until the year Saka 1103 (1181 AD/CE).

Realizing that the task of a king is very difficult, to control the course of government, King Jayapangus used several Hindu law books as guidelines for the implementation of government, which were obeyed by all government officials or implementers. The law books that are often mentioned in inscriptions include the Manawakamandaka law book, Manawakamandaka Dharmasastra, and Manawaśasanadharma.

== See also ==
- History of Bali
- Indian national calendar (Saka)
- Hinduism in Indonesia
- China-Indonesia relations

== Sources ==
- Andy Barski, Albert Beaucort and Bruce Carpenter, Barski (2007). Bali and Lombok. Dorling Kindersley, London. ISBN 978-0-7566-2878-9.
