= Dewa Agung =

Dewa Agung or Deva Agung was the title of the kings of Klungkung, the foremost in rank among the nine kingdoms of Bali, Indonesia. It was also borne by other high-ranking members of the dynasty. The term Dewa means "god" and was also a general title for members of the Ksatria caste. Agung translates as "high" or "great". Literally, the title therefore means Great God.

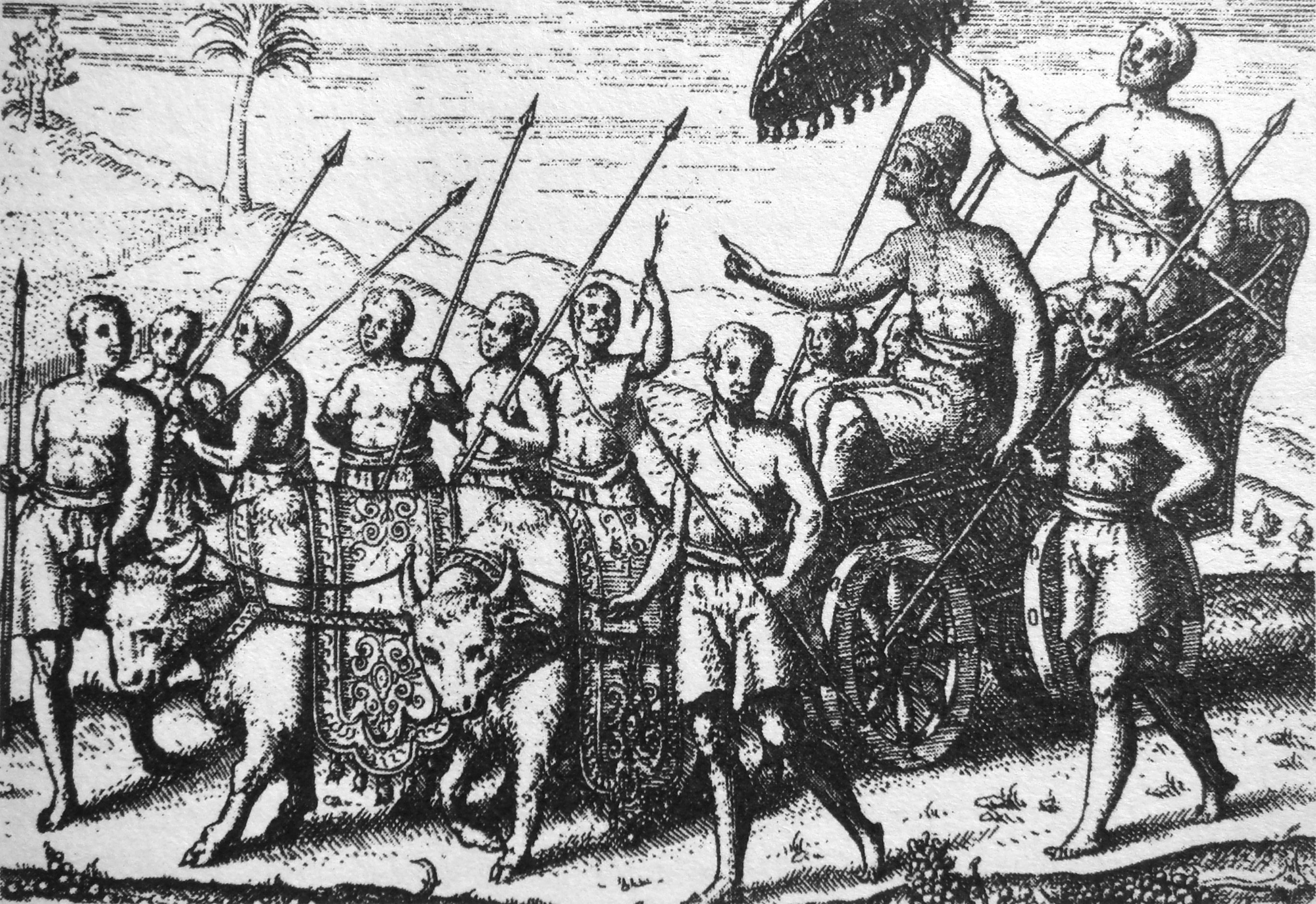
Description of the Balinese king Dewa Agung pulled by two white buffaloes, in Houtman's 1597 Verhael vande Reyse ... Naer Oost Indien.

The rulers of Gelgel, who claimed authority over entire Bali and surrounding territories up to the late 17th century, were usually known by the royal title Dalem, literally "inside". After 1686, descendants of the old Gelgel line resided in the Klungkung Palace, a few kilometers north of Gelgel, and adopted the new title. Their direct authority encompassed a rather small territory around the palace, and the nearby island Nusa Penida. They were acknowledged by the other Balinese lords as having a ritual precedence position, although their ability to impose their will on the other eight kings were limited. An important cornerstone in the authority of the Dewa Agung line was their possession of pusaka objects (heirlooms) which entailed supposed magical capabilities.

A contract with the Netherlands East Indies was signed in 1843, and supposedly placed Klungkung under Dutch suzerainty. Contracts with other Balinese states were signed at the same time. Controversies surrounding the interpretation of the contracts led to three Dutch expeditions to the island in 1846, 1848 and 1849. The 1849 expedition defeated the kingdoms of Buleleng and Karangasem and then invaded the territory of Klungkung. The Dutch army encountered difficulties when the commanding general A. V. Michiels was killed by Klungkung warriors. A peace treaty followed which left the south Balinese kingdoms autonomous under nominal Dutch suzerainty. After 1900 Dutch colonial policy became more active, and intended to suppress the virtually independent position that the princedoms in large parts of Indonesia had so far enjoyed. As a part of this the hawkish Governor General J. B. van Heutsz began to interfere in the affairs of Bali.

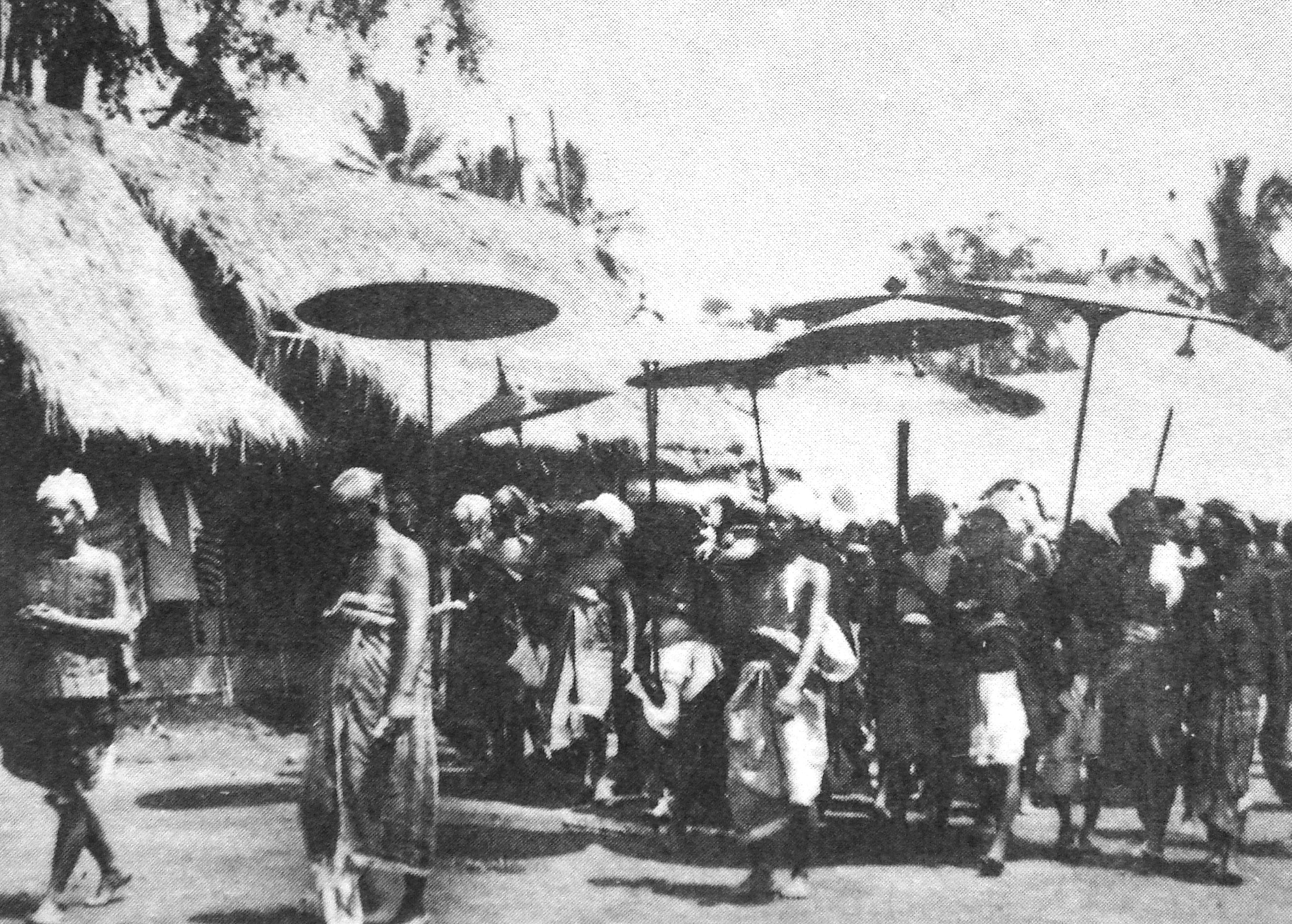
Dewa Agung Jambe II arriving in Gianyar to negotiate with the Dutch during the Dutch intervention in Bali (1906).

The last Dewa Agung lost his life in the so-called puputan of Klungkung Palace on 28 April 1908 during the Dutch intervention in Bali (1908). This was a ritually laden suicidal attack by the dynasty and their retainers against a well-armed detachment of Dutch colonial troops. In the end almost two hundred Balinese were killed by Dutch bullets or by their own hand.

After this event Klungkung was placed under direct Dutch rule. In 1929 a nephew of the last ruler, Dewa Agung Oka Geg, was appointed regent by the colonial authorities. In 1938 the status of him and seven other Balinese regents was elevated to zelfbestuurder or raja. After the formation of a unitary Indonesian state in 1949–1950, the raja rule was phased out in Bali and elsewhere. The Dewa Agung title lapsed with the death of Dewa Agung Oka Geg in 1964. Members of his family have since periodically governed Klungkung as bupati (regents).

Ruling members of the Dewa Agung dynasty

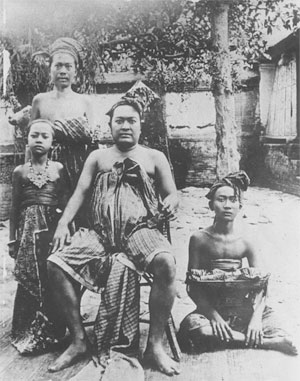
Dewa Agung Jambe II in 1908.

- Dewa Agung Jambe I 1686-c. 1722 (scion of the Gelgel dynasty)
- Dewa Agung Gede or Surawirya c. 1722-1736 (son)
- Dewa Agung Made 1736-before 1769 (son)
- Dewa Agung Sakti late 18th century (son)
- Dewa Agung Putra I end of 18th century-1809 (son)
- Dewa Agung Putra II 1814-1850 (son)
- Dewa Agung Putra III 1851-1903 (cousin)
- Dewa Agung Jambe II 1903-1908 (son)
- Dewa Agung Oka Geg 1929-1950 (nephew)

== See also ==
- History of Bali
- List of monarchs of Bali
