= Samprangan =

Coordinates: 8°32′24″S 115°20′21″E

Samprangan, also spelt Samplangan, is a historical site on Bali, Indonesia. It is situated about one kilometer to the east of Gianyar town. According to Balinese historical tradition, it was the first residence of the dynasty of kings of Bali who descended from the Javanese Majapahit Empire, being established after the Javanese conquest of Bali in 1343. After a few generations, in the late 14th or 15th century, Samprangan was replaced as royal residence by Gelgel further to the east (in the present-day Klungkung regency). Today there are hardly any traces left of the old palace compound.
