= Klungkung Palace =

Palace in Indonesia

Coordinates: 8°32′8″S 115°24′12″E

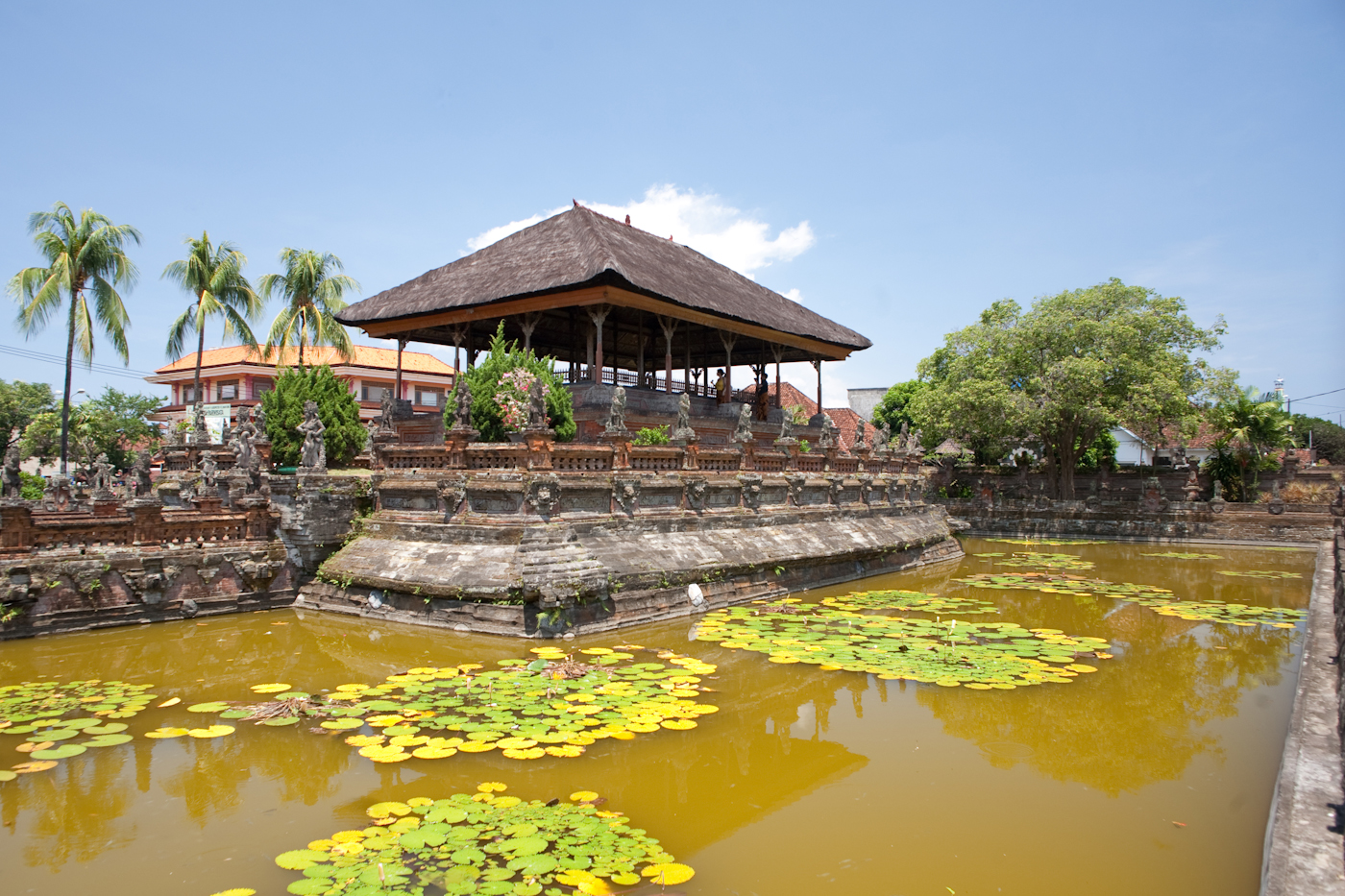
Bale Kambang of Klungkung Palace

The Klungkung Palace, officially Puri Agung Semarapura, is a historical building complex situated in Semarapura, the capital of the Klungkung Regency (kabupaten) on Bali, Indonesia.

The palace (puri) was erected at the end of the 17th century, but largely destroyed during the Dutch colonial conquest. Today the basic remains of the palace are the court of justice, the Kertha Gosa Pavilion, and the main gate that bears the date Saka 1622 (AD 1700). Within the old palace compound is also a floating pavilion, the Bale Kembang. The descendants of the rajas that once ruled Klungkung today live in Puri Agung, a residence to the west of the old palace, which was built after 1929.

== History ==
=== The origins of the palace - context ===
The kingdom of Gelgel (ca. 15th century – mid 17th century) was the first unified power in Bali. The Babad Dalem, a chronicle (Note: It is important to take into account that Balinese "chronicles", or babad, are not "historical" in the occidental understanding of the word. To start with, their writers were literary brahmana, ksatria or wesia very close to the Hindu-Javanese civilization, which they saw as the basis of Bali-ness, and their writings are dominated with Indic and Javanese models of kingship, rituals and ethics. Besides this (or as a side-effect of this), they were mostly concerned with genealogies, which means that many members of ruling families may be cited but other historical protagonists were not even mentioned, however important these may have been to history. They also had a strong bias toward enhancing said ruling family: lost wars and other disparaging happenings may be silenced, reduced to incidents or explained in mythological terms.) of the kingdom of Klungkung, records its kings' dynasty by the name of Kapaisan, a genealogy that is traced back to the Javanese kingdom of Majapahit (1293-16th century).

Dalem Di Made, considered to be the last king of Gelgel, reigned from the time of death of his father king Dalem Seganing (ca. 1623). During his reign, some aristocrats in the realm gained power to the king's detriment, factions became stronger. The chief minister of the king and member of the powerful patih (vice-regent) family of Gelgel, Gusti Anung Maruti, eventually took power from the king - the date of this event being unsure. Prisoner in his own Gelgel palace, according to some sources the king managed to escape to Guliang in southern Bangli. Gusti Anung Maruti is mentioned in Dutch sources as a regent dominant in South Bali; he is also mentioned as ruling in Gelgel in 1665-1667 and again in 1686.
On the other hand, other sources suggest that Di Made was succeeded by Dewa Pacekan; upon which internal feuds broke out. Dewa Cawu - Di Made's brother - was crowned as nominal king in 1651, in a context of civil wars raging through the island; and the king who died in Guliang was Dewa Cawu. At any rate, it seems that by the late 1630s Gusti or Anglurah Agung had already become a dominant political force at the royal court, and that the tenancy of the throne shifted between 1639 and 1643. The Dutch in Batavia received correspondence from the Gelgel court in 1656, announcing that Maruti was the new ruler of Bali.

In 1686 Dewa Agung Jambe I (Dalem Di Made's son), assisted by nobles from Badung, Karangasem and Tabanan, defeated Gusti Anung Maruti and gained possession of Gelgel. Within a few years he then set up a new court 3 km north of Gelgel and named his capital Puri Semarapura: "The Abode of the Gods".

Thus the Klungkung kingdom was the heir of the old Gelgel kingdom. Although he did not have the prerogatives of his Gelgel forebears, the new palace maintained a degree of prestige and precedence on the politically fragmented island.

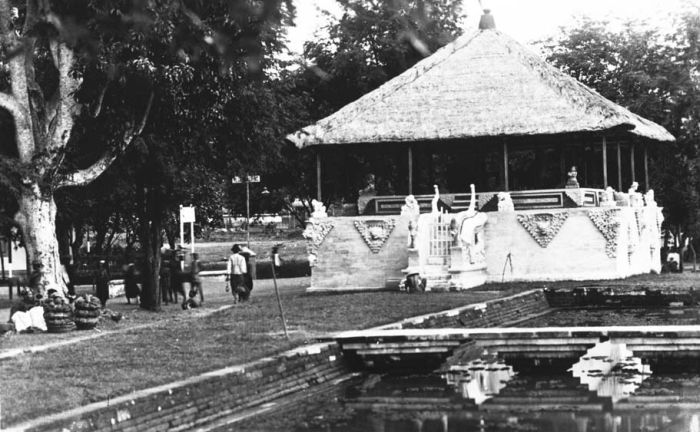
The assembly hall (Kerta Gosa) at the palace, 1930's

=== Early history ===
The descendants of the first king, Dewa Agung Jambe (r. 1686-c. 1722), ruled under varying fortunes for more than two centuries. They were always known by the title Dewa Agung. Dewa Agung Gede alias Surawirya (r. c. 1722-1736) allied with the influential king of Mengwi and performed an expedition to Java together with him. After he died in 1736, internal fighting broke out between his two sons Dewa Agung Gede (Jr.) and Dewa Agung Made. The former called in help from the Karangasem kingdom but was defeated. The victor Dewa Agung Made was succeeded by a mentally ill son, Dewa Agung Sakti (r. before 1769-end of 18th century). His wife fled to Karangasem where her son Dewa Agung Putra I was brought up. At about the end of the 18th century, his Karangasem helpers established him on the throne of Klungkung. Dewa Agung Putra I appears to have been a strong leader but fell in a minor war in Bangli in 1809. He left a son, Dewa Agung Putra II (r. 1814-1850), and a daughter and co-regent, Dewa Agung Istri Kanya.

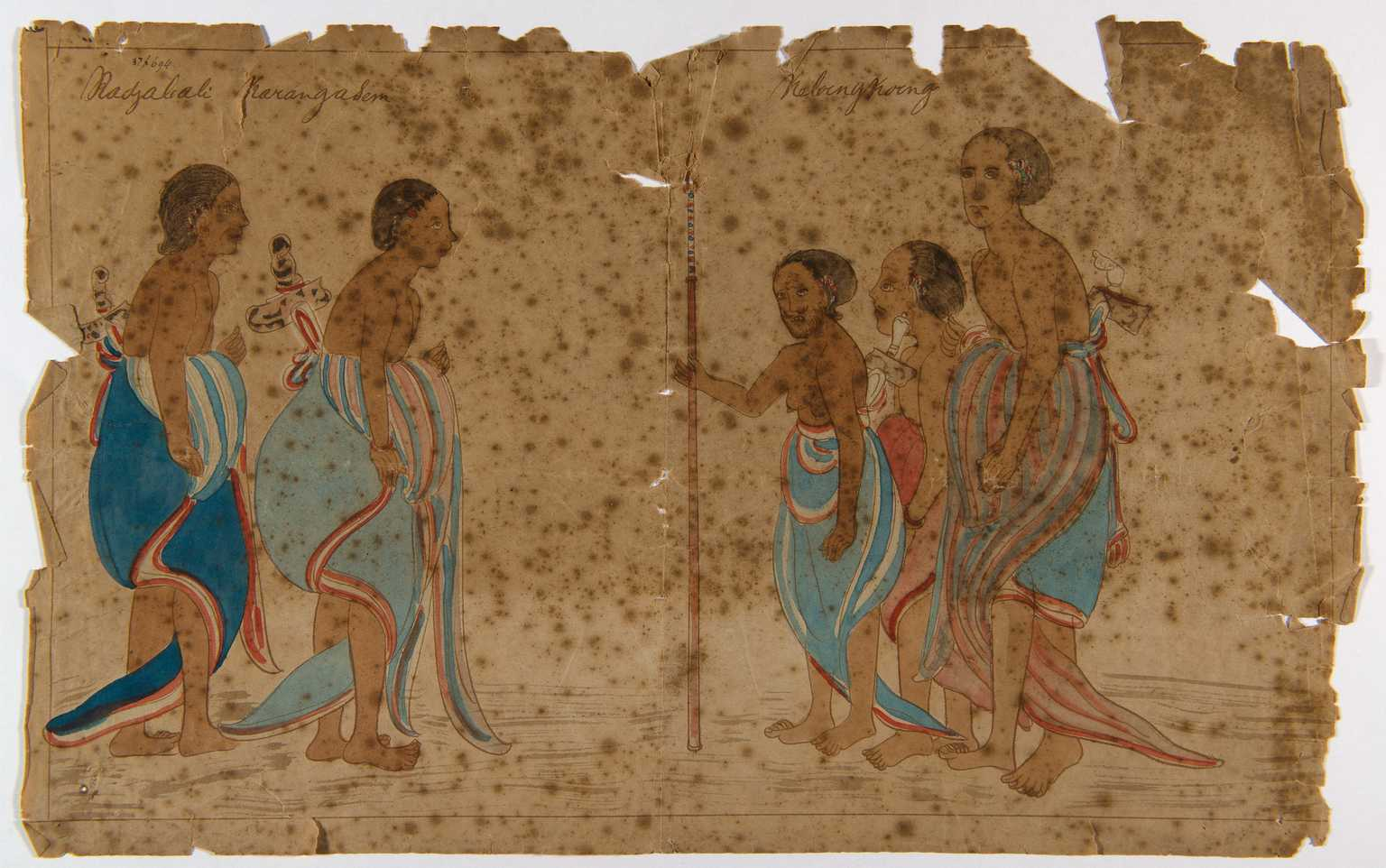
A meeting between the Rajas of Klungkung (right) and Karangasem (left), the image created before 1864.

=== The Dutch interference ===
Together with the other Balinese rajas, Dewa Agung Putra II signed a contract with the Dutch colonial authorities in 1843, but the varying interpretations of the contract soon caused friction. This was the background to the three Dutch military expeditions in 1846, 1848, and 1849. The last of these expeditions invaded Klungkung territory. The enterprising queen Dewa Agung Istri Kanya fought the Dutch to a standstill, and this was followed by a general reconciliation between the Balinese rajas and the Dutch authorities. In the following decades, the kingdom was led by a grandson of Dewa Agung Sakti, Dewa Agung Putra III (r. 1851-1903). He was an activist leader who intervened in the affairs of the other south Balinese kingdoms, which were still only nominally attached to the Dutch East Indies. In 1885 he imprisoned the Raja of Gianyar, and in 1891 he was heavily responsible for the destruction of the Mengwi kingdom. After 1900 Dutch presence made itself increasingly felt in south Bali. In this situation, Dewa Agung Putra III died and was succeeded by his son Dewa Agung Jambe II (r. 1903-1908 ). He took a defiant attitude against the encroaching colonialism.

=== The fall of Klungkung ===
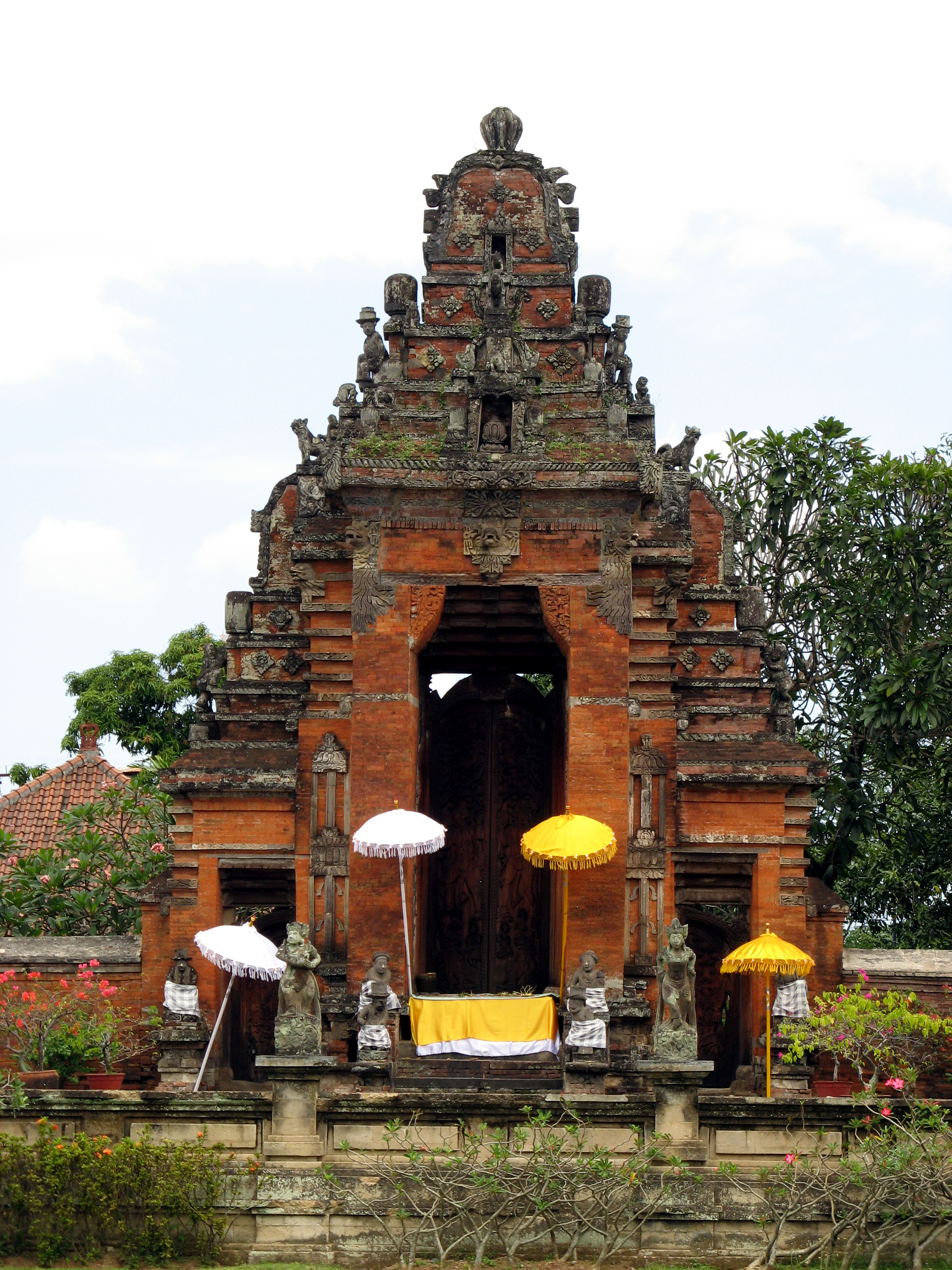
South gate to the palace

The alleged plundering of the stranded ship Sri Kumala in 1904, led to a renewed Dutch military foray in 1906. The colonial troops captured Badung after a suicidal attack on the invaders, a so-called puputan ("finishing"). Two years later, in a similar manner, an incident in nearby Gelgel triggered a punitive colonial expedition to Klungkung (see Dutch intervention in Bali (1908)). The local Balinese elite chose to make a last stand against the Dutch. Dewa Agung Jambe II, the members of his dynasty and their retainers sallied forth from the palace and engaged in a puputan. The fight, which took place on 18 April 1908, proceeded until the death of the last of the combatants, which included women and children. Those not killed by Dutch bullets were finished off by other members of the royal group.

After the puputan, the surviving members of the royal family were exiled, and the palace was largely razed to the ground. In 1929 the family was allowed to return and settled in the newly built Puri Agung.

Today, the history of Klungkung, and the puputan, are commemorated in a museum close to the remains of the palace. To the north of the palace, a monument has been erected to the memory of the puputan incident.

== Description ==
The Babad Dalem mentions Puri Semarapura – and other palaces – as a replica of the Gelgel palace.

The palace was built in square form, being roughly 150 meters on each side with the main gate to the north. It was divided into several blocks with various ritual and practical functions. The complex displayed a deep symbolism according to a fixed structural pattern.

=== The Kerta Gosa ===
The city was known at that time for its arts, painting, dance, and music. At the end of the 18th century, the Kerta Gosa Pavilion, also spelled Kertha Gosa or Kertha Ghosa, the Hall of Justice, was erected in the northeastern corner of the palace compound. It typified the Klungkung style of architecture and painting. Because the Kerta Gosa was the court of the high king of Bali, cases on the island that could not be resolved were transferred to this site. Three Brahmana priests presided over the court. The convicts (as well as visitors today) were able to view the ceiling which depicted different punishments in the afterlife, and the results of karma, while they were awaiting sentencing. The ceiling paintings of the Kerta Gosa are one of the outstanding examples of Kamasan Wayang style. The paintings were probably originally done in the middle of the nineteenth century, and renewed in 1918, 1933, and 1963, with individual panels repaired in the 1980s and 1990s. Leading artists of Kamasan village such as Kaki Rambut, Pan Seken, Mangku Mura, and Nyoman Mandra have been responsible for the repaintings in the twentieth century. The main paintings depict the story of Bima in heaven and hell, but other stories depicted are the Tantri, the Garuda story, and scenes predicting the portents of earthquakes (Palindon).

Kerta Gosa

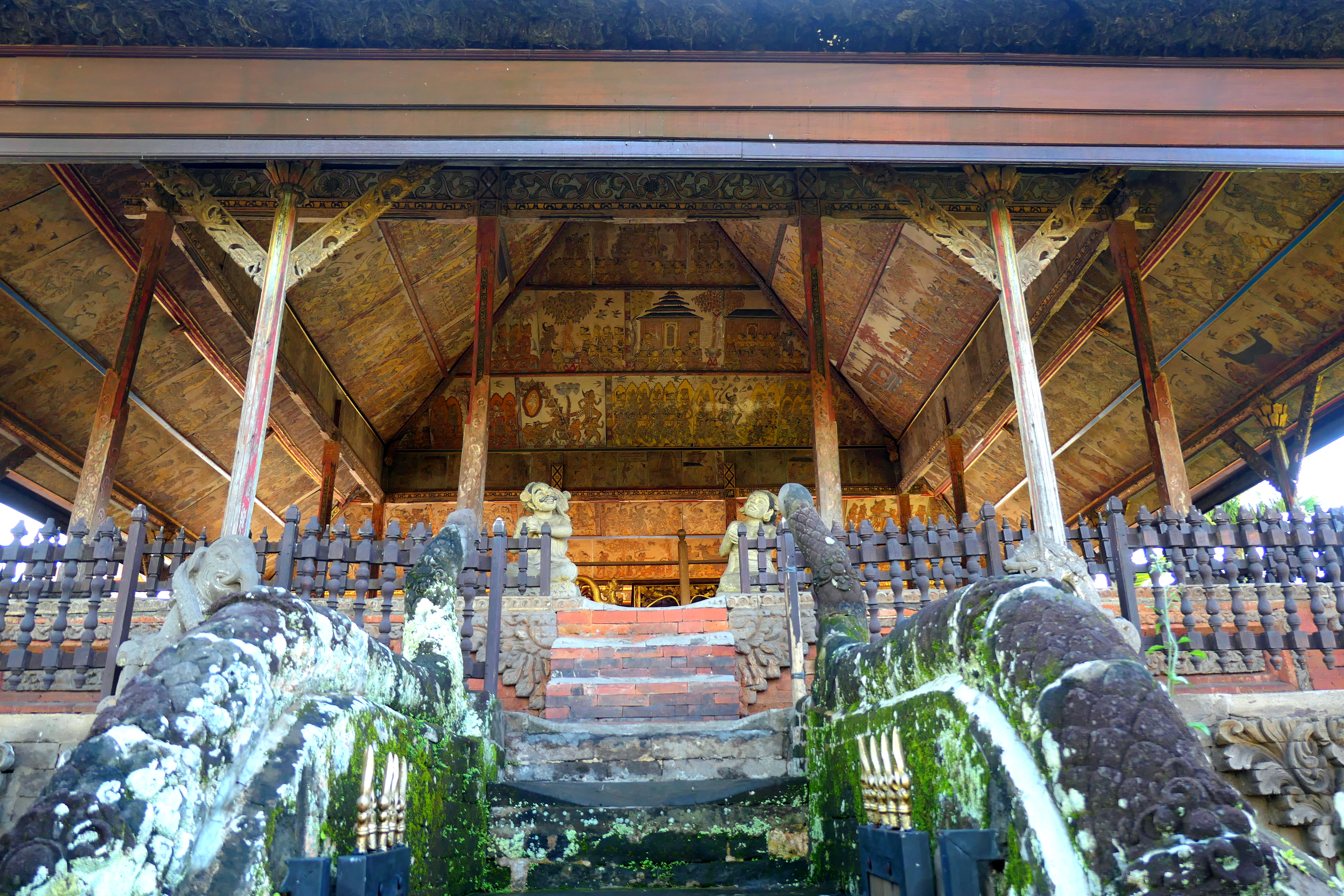

=== Bale Kambang ===
Bale Kambang, another pavilion with no wall, is in the same courtyard and adjacent to the Kerta Gosa. Its name means Floating Pavilion : it is surrounded by a moat that gives this impression. Its ceiling also hosts paintings, equally complex and arranged on six levels. They illustrate three popular Balinese tales, dominated by those of the Sutasoma. The lowest level of paintings depicts Balinese astrological charts - the Palalintangan -; the second level is about the Men Brayut folktale of ideal family. The four higher levels are of the Sutasoma.

Its destination is uncertain. I. Puccy says that it was used as the royal guards' headquarters and as an antechamber for the king's visitors. For G. Kam, it was used by the royals for pleasure, relaxing and entertaining. As of 2015, Kam's view has gained consensus; but D. Pham thinks that the latter does not give a complete representation of the building's significance. He underlines the dimension of meditation, supported by the top two levels of paintings that expound the pacification of obstacles, resistance of temptation by the nymphs, and self-realization as Mahavairocana.

This pavilion's architecture symbolizes Meru, the center of the universe, surrounded by the moat for the cosmic ocean and source of life Anavatapa. Mount Meru is then seen as the symbolic center of the realm. But it is also a link to the spiritual power of the lineage : me, or meme, means "mother", "eartly existence"; and ru means "teacher and "father", the humanly realm. The combination of the two syllables means the founders of the ancestral lineage.

Bale Kambang

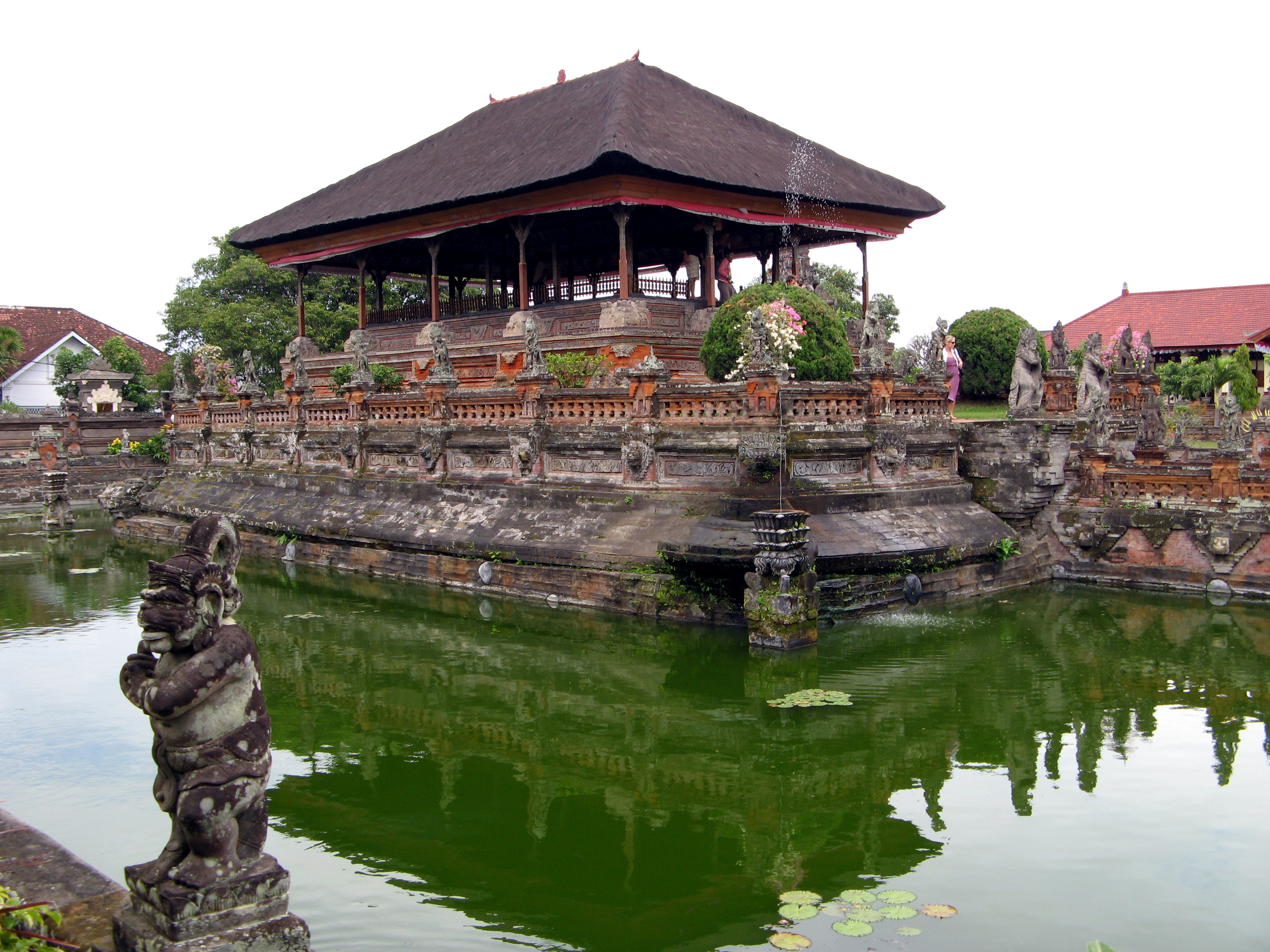

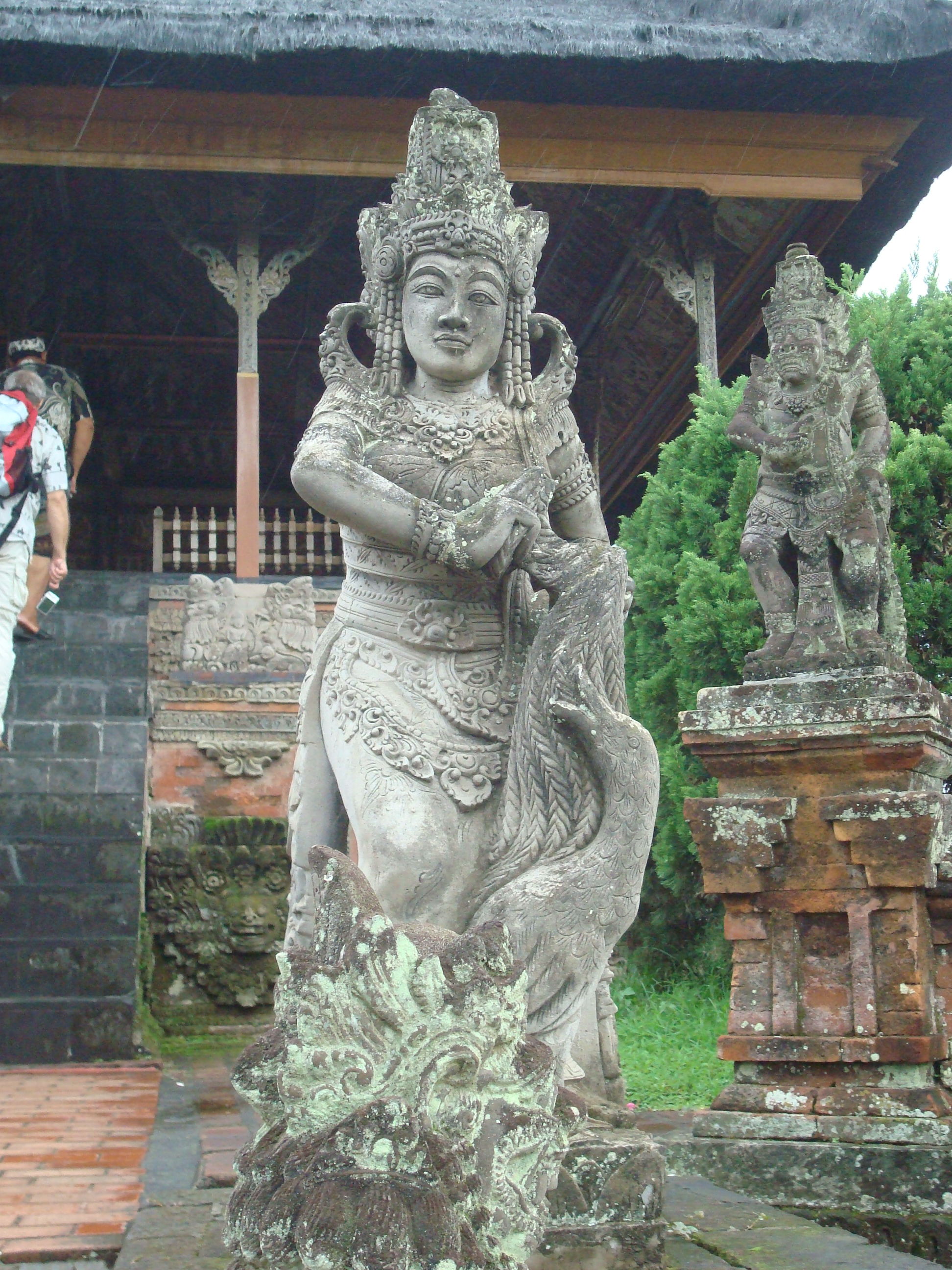

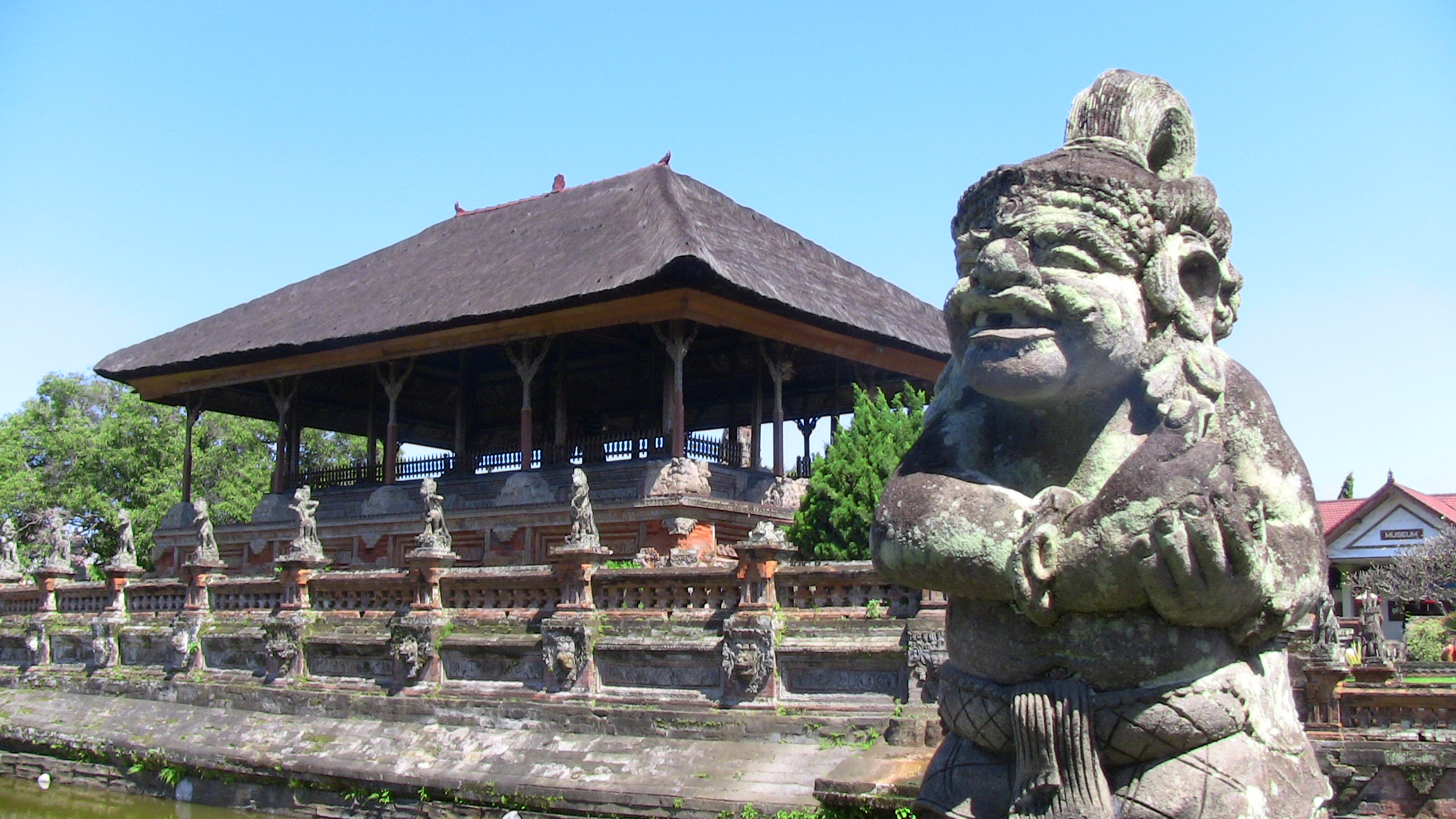
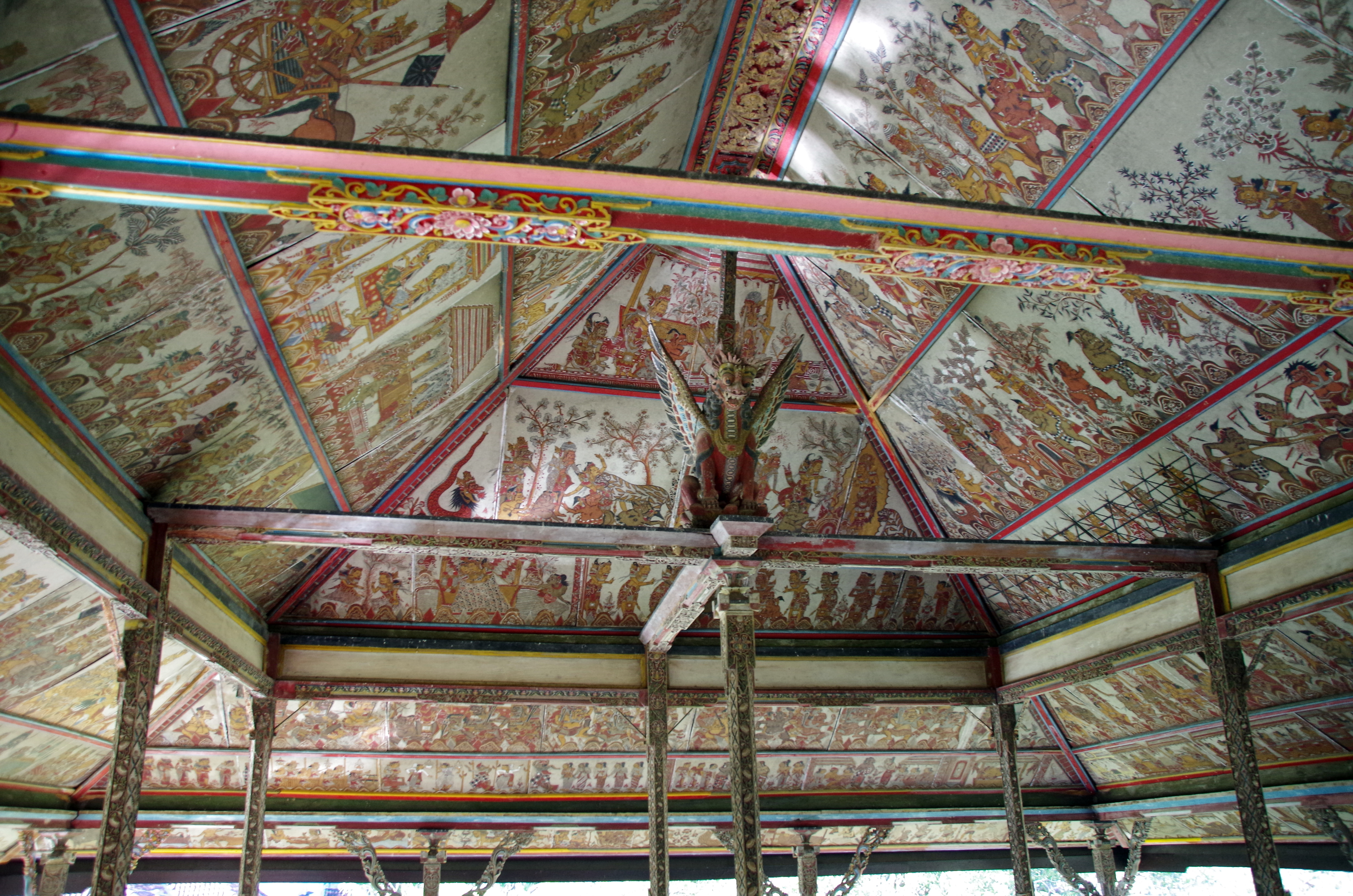

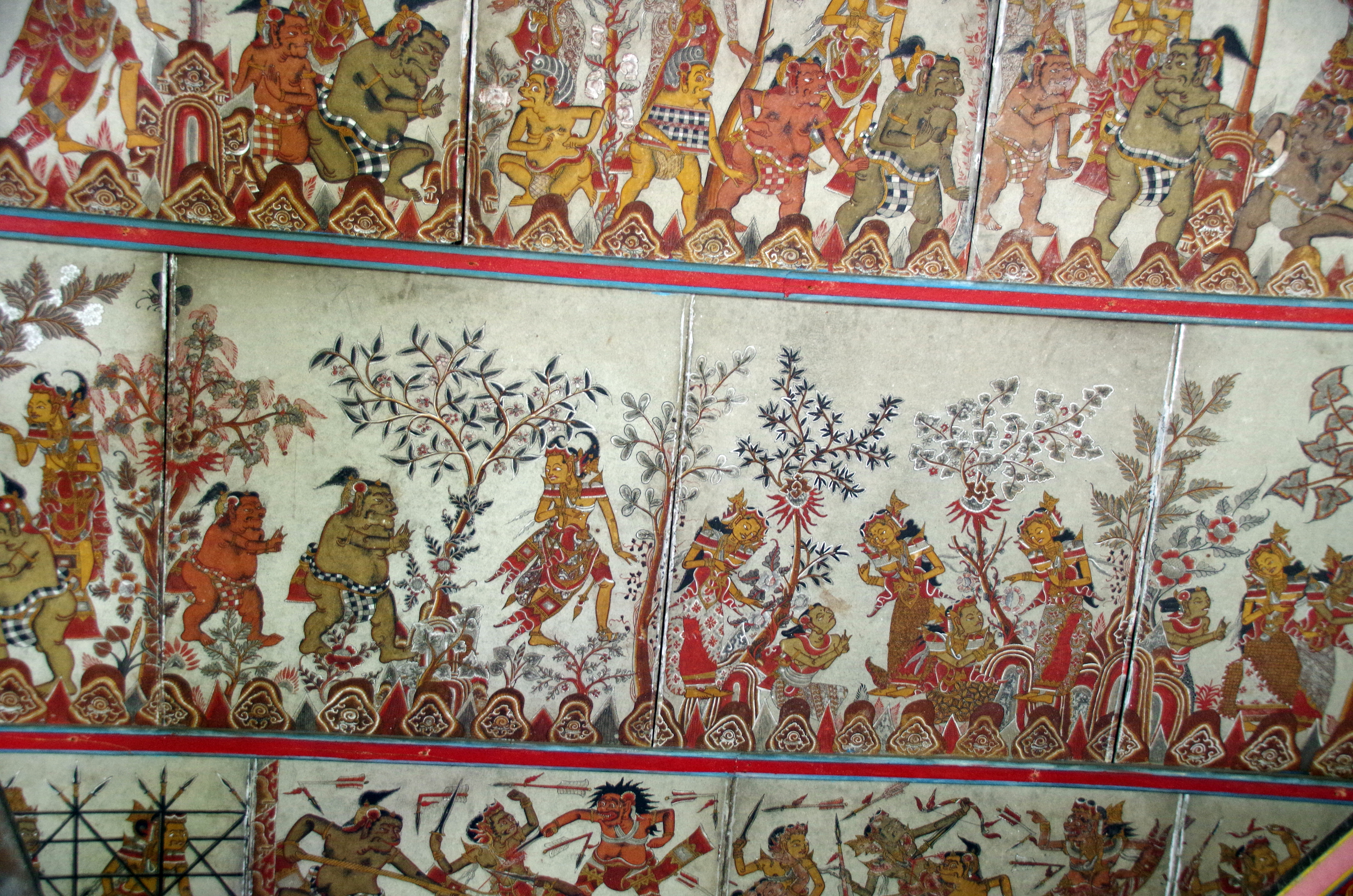

== See also ==
- Ubud Palace
- History of Bali
- List of palaces
- List of monarchs of Bali
- List of palaces in Indonesia
