= Gelgel, Indonesia =

Village

Coordinates: 8°33′51″S 115°24′43″E

Gelgel is a village (desa) in the regency (kabupaten) of Klungkung, on Bali, Indonesia. The village, near the coast four kilometers south of the regency capital Semarapura, contains some structures of cultural interest and is known for its pottery and handwoven ceremonial songket cloth.

The height of the village's power came during the kingdom of Gelgel, which dominated Bali from around the early 16th century to 1686. There are no traces left today of the old royal palace (puri). The old ancestral shrine of the ruling dynasty, Pura Jero Agung, is still standing in the old palace area. To the east of Pura Jero Agung is another old temple, Pura Dasar, which is a lowland counterpart of the "mother temple" of Bali, Pura Besakih. The village also contains the oldest mosque in Bali, which was built by Javanese retainers of the old kings.

== Early history ==
The history of Gelgel is described in detail in the traditional chronicles (babad), in particular the 18th-century work Babad Dalem. According to these texts, the conquest of Bali by the Hindu Javanese kingdom of Majapahit was followed by the installation of a vassal dynasty in Samprangan in the present-day regency Gianyar, close to the old royal centre Bedulu. This installation took place in the age of the Majapahit minister Gajah Mada (d. 1364). The first Samprangan ruler Sri Aji Kresna Kepakisan had three sons. The eldest, Dalem Samprangan, succeeded his father but turned out to be a vain and incompetent ruler. His youngest brother Dalem Ketut founded a new royal seat in Gelgel, while Samprangan's power waned. He later visited Majapahit and received powerful heirlooms (pusaka) from King Hayam Wuruk. After a while the Majapahit kingdom fell into chaos and vanished, leaving Dalem Ketut and his Balinese kingdom as the heirs of its Hindu-Javanese culture. This traditional account is problematic since it includes irreconcilable chronological difficulties; the Majapahit ruler Hayam Wuruk died in 1389, while the fall of Majapahit occurred much later, in the early 16th century.

== The golden age ==
Maximum extent of Balinese Kingdom of Gelgel in mid 16th century. Including vassals and Balinese colonies.

It is clear from a comparison of external and indigenous sources that Gelgel was a powerful polity in Bali in the 16th century. The son of Dewa Ketut, Dalem Baturenggong, presumably reigned in the mid-16th century. He received at his court a Brahmin sage called Nirartha who had fled from chaotic conditions in Java. A fruitful patron-priest relationship was forged between the ruler and Nirartha, who engaged in extensive literary activity. In the time of Dalem Baturenggong, Lombok, West Sumbawa, and Blambangan (easternmost Java) are thought to have come under Gelgel's suzerainty. After his death, his son Dalem Bekung led a troubled reign marked by two serious rebellions by court aristocrats (traditionally dated in 1558 and 1578) and a severe military defeat against the Javanese kingdom of Pasuruan. His brother and successor Dalem Seganing was a successful king whose long reign was relatively free from internal troubles. An indigenous list of dates places his death at 1623, although some historians have placed it later. The son of Dalem Seganing, Dalem Di Made, dispatched another unsuccessful expedition against Java, which was defeated by the king of Mataram. In his old age, he lost power to his foremost minister (patih), Anglurah Agung (Gusti Agung Maruti). Certain indigenous texts place his death in 1642, but historians have also proposed 1651 or c. 1665 as the correct date.

Dutch and Portuguese sources confirm the existence of a powerful kingdom in the 16th and 17th centuries, to which the neighbouring areas Lombok, West Sumbawa, and Balambangan stood in a tributary or loosely subordinate relation. At the side of the king (dalem) stood senior ministers belonging to the Agung and Ler families, and a hereditary line of Brahmana preceptors. The Gelgel kingdom was threatened by the sea-oriented Makassar kingdom in c. 1619, which deprived it of its interests in Sumbawa and at least parts of Lombok. With Mataram fighting took place over the possession of Blambangan in 1635-1647; in the end, Gelgel gained the upper hand. The Dutch appeared on the island for the first time in 1597 and entered friendly relations with the Gelgel ruler. Subsequent relations between the Dutch East India Company (VOC) and the kings of Gelgel were usually good, although attempts at concrete political cooperation were mostly unsuccessful. The Portuguese in Malacca dispatched an abortive missionary expedition to the king in 1635. European sources describe Bali at this time as a densely populated island with more than 300,000 people and a flourishing agricultural production. By the early 17th century it was linked to the economic networks of the Southeast Asian Archipelago through traders from the Pasisir area on Java's north coast. These traders exchanged pepper from the western part of the archipelago for cotton cloth produced on Bali, which was then brought to eastern Indonesia and the Philippines. There was no significant category of native Balinese merchants, however.

== Fragmentation and fall ==
According to both indigenous and Dutch sources, internal fighting broke out in 1651 after the demise of a Gelgel ruler, and the internecine trouble continued over the next decades. The royal minister Anglurah Agung set himself up as ruler of Gelgel from at least 1665 but encountered opposition from various corners. Finally, in 1686, Anglurah Agung fell in battle against the nobleman Batulepang. After this event, a scion of the old royal line called Dewa Agung Jambe established himself as the new upper ruler, with his seat in Klungkung (Semarapura). The Klungkung kingdom would last until the 20th century. However, the new kingdom was unable to gather the elite groups on Bali like Gelgel had done. The rulers (Dewa Agung) of Klungkung continued to hold the position as paramount kings, but the island was split up into several minor kingdoms (Karangasem, Sukawati, Buleleng, Tabanan, Badung, etc.). This situation of political fragmentation continued until the Dutch colonial conquest between 1849 and 1908. With the royal seat moved, Gelgel itself was turned into a village that was administered by a side branch of the Dewa Agung dynasty. In about the 1730s the current Gelgel lord was attacked and killed by three princes of Karangasem, whose father he had murdered. In 1908, during the Dutch intervention in Bali, the local lord attacked a troop of Dutch colonial soldiers, which was the catalyst for the well-known puputan of the Klungkung Palace (18 April 1908) where the royal dynasty and their retainers performed a suicidal attack against well-armed Dutch troops.

== List of rulers ==
- Dalem Ketut, early 16th century?
- Dalem Baturenggong, mid 16th century
- Dalem Bekung, mentioned 1558–1578
- Dalem Seganing, d. 1623 or 1651
- Dalem Di Made, d. 1642 or 1651 or 1665
- Dewa Pacekan, d. 1650? (mentioned in some lists only)
- Dewa Cawu, d. 1673? (mentioned in some lists only)
- Anglurah Agung, before 1665–1686

== See also ==
- History of Bali
- List of monarchs of Bali
