= Dewa Cawu =

King of Bali (died 1673)

- Prince of Bali (possibly King of Gelgel)
- Possible Reign: c. 1651 (possibly a short reign)
- Predecessor: Dalem Di Made
- Successor: Anglurah Agung (usurper)
- Died: (April or May 1673); Guliang, Bangli regency
- Dynasty: Gelgel dynasty (claimed descent from Majapahit Empire)
- Father: Dalem Seganing

Dewa Cawu (died April or May 1673) was a prince on the Island of Bali, who possibly reigned as king for a short while in the 1650s. He belonged to a dynasty that claimed descent from the Hindu-Javanese Majapahit Empire, and kept its palace (puri) in Gelgel near Bali's south coast.

== Assistant to Dalem Di Made ==
According to Balinese historiography, written much later, he was one of the fourteen sons of the king Dalem Seganing, and born from a secondary (penawing). He seems to have held a high position during the reign of his brother Dalem Di Made (1623?-1642?). Dutch sources from the 1630s mention a brother of the current ruler called 'T'jouw' or 'Tchau' who negotiated with the Dutch East Indies Company on the ruler's behalf. According to an annual entry in the Balinese text Pawawatekan the Gelgel kingdom fell apart in 1651, at the same time as Dewa Cawu was enthroned as king. The outbreak of internal fighting on Bali in 1651 is likewise mentioned in Dutch sources.

== Exile and death ==
Dewa Cawu is not mentioned as ruler in his own right in later Balinese historiography. Also, his time as ruler or pretender-ruler was apparently short and hampered by the ongoing internal warfare. By 1665 the old chief minister of the kingdom, Anglurah Agung, had usurped power, which he retained until his death in 1686. An annal entry states that Dewa Cawu died in Guliang in the present Bangli regency, in 1673. The 18th-century chronicle Babad Dalem likewise speaks of a ruler who died in exile in Guliang, although this ruler is identified with his elder brother Dalem Di Made. The dynastic conditions on Bali at this time are therefore partly obscure, with largely contradictive sources.

== See also ==
- History of Bali
- List of monarchs of Bali
- Gelgel, Indonesia

Preceded by Dewa Pacekan	King of Bali; 1651-1665	Succeeded by Anglurah Agung
