= Dalem Seganing =

King of Bali (1550–1632)

Dalem Segening was a king of Bali who reigned in the first half of the 17th century, his exact dating being still uncertain. He belonged to a dynasty which originated from Majapahit on Java, and ruled from the palace (puri) of Gelgel.

== Accession to the throne ==
Dalem Segening is briefly mentioned as king in the religious texts Usana Bali and Rajapurana Besakih. However, most of the surviving details of his reign come from the Babad Dalem, a chronicle from the 18th century. He was the younger son of the Gelgel ruler Dalem Baturenggong and the daughter of Dukuh Seganing. He loyally supported his elder brother, king Dalem Bekung, whose reign was beset by rebellions and abortive warfare.

According to some versions he took royal powers even before the death of his incapable brother. He might have been the Balinese king who met the first Dutch visitors to the island in 1597. Dalem Seganing was assisted in his reign by two chief ministers, the brothers Kiyayi Agung and Kiyayi Ler (Lor). The latter is possibly identical with 'Kijloer', the supreme Balinese minister at the time of the 1597 visit. According to a Dutch text, "This Kijloer is, besides the king, the uppermost of the entire Island of Bali, and no-one may come to the king in the palace as he wishes, except this Kijloer".

== Reign ==
The reign of Dalem Segening was briefly troubled by a rebellion by the nobleman Pinatih, an event dated in 1605 by a Balinese text. However, the minister Kiyayi Agung was able to persuade Pinatih to lay down arms. For the rest, the chronicles praise the age of Dalem Seganing as peaceful and successful. His death is dated 1623 in a text, but it has also been suggested that he died in 1651. He had 14 sons of whom Dalem Di Made succeeded to the throne.

In the late historical text Babad Buleleng (1920), the founder of the Buleleng kingdom in North Bali, Gusti Panji Sakti, is claimed to be a son of Dalem Seganing. The same paternity is claimed for Dewa Manggis I, the ancestor of the kings of Gianyar.

== External threats and trade relations ==
From external, in particular Dutch sources, it can be seen that the Gelgel kingdom on Bali was relatively stable and powerful in the first half of the 17th century. The rulers claimed a loose suzerainty over Blambangan in East Java, Lombok, and Sumbawa. However, the warlike activities of the Makassar kingdom of South Sulawesi deprived the Gelgel ruler of his interests in Sumbawa in c. 1618-19, and jeopardized his hold on Lombok.

The Dutch East Indies Company (Vereenigde Oost-Indische Compagnie or VOC) was interested in Bali for economic and strategical reasons, as being a Hindu realm that was opposed to the Muslim Mataram kingdom on Java. Among the items coveted by the VOC were rice, cattle and slave women, and a trading post was briefly established in c. 1620. It was quickly withdrawn, though, and Balinese trade with the outside world was henceforth carried out by Dutch private traders, Chinese, and various Indonesian groups.

== Family ==
Dalem Segening was married to a daughter of Kiyayi di Ler, minister in Gelgel; and with Gusti Luh Made, a daughter of Gusti Ketut Bebengan. He also had a number of co-wives and mistresses. The king sired 14 sons and a daughter:

- Dalem Di Made, who succeeded as King of Bali
- Dewa Kaleran (Dewa Anom)
- Dewa Karangasem
- Dewa Cawu
- Dewa Blayu
- Dewa Sumerta
- Dewa Pamregan
- Dewa Lebah
- Dewa Sidan
- Dewa Kabetan
- Dewa Pasawahan
- Dewa Kulit
- Dewa Bedahulu
- Gusti Mambal, adopted as son by the minister Kiyayi di Ler Pranawa
- Dewa Randa Guwang, daughter.

== See also ==
- History of Bali
- List of monarchs of Bali
- Gelgel, Indonesia

Preceded by Dalem Bekung	King of Bali c. 1580-1623	Succeeded by Dalem Di Made
