= Babad Blambangan =

Javanese manuscripts

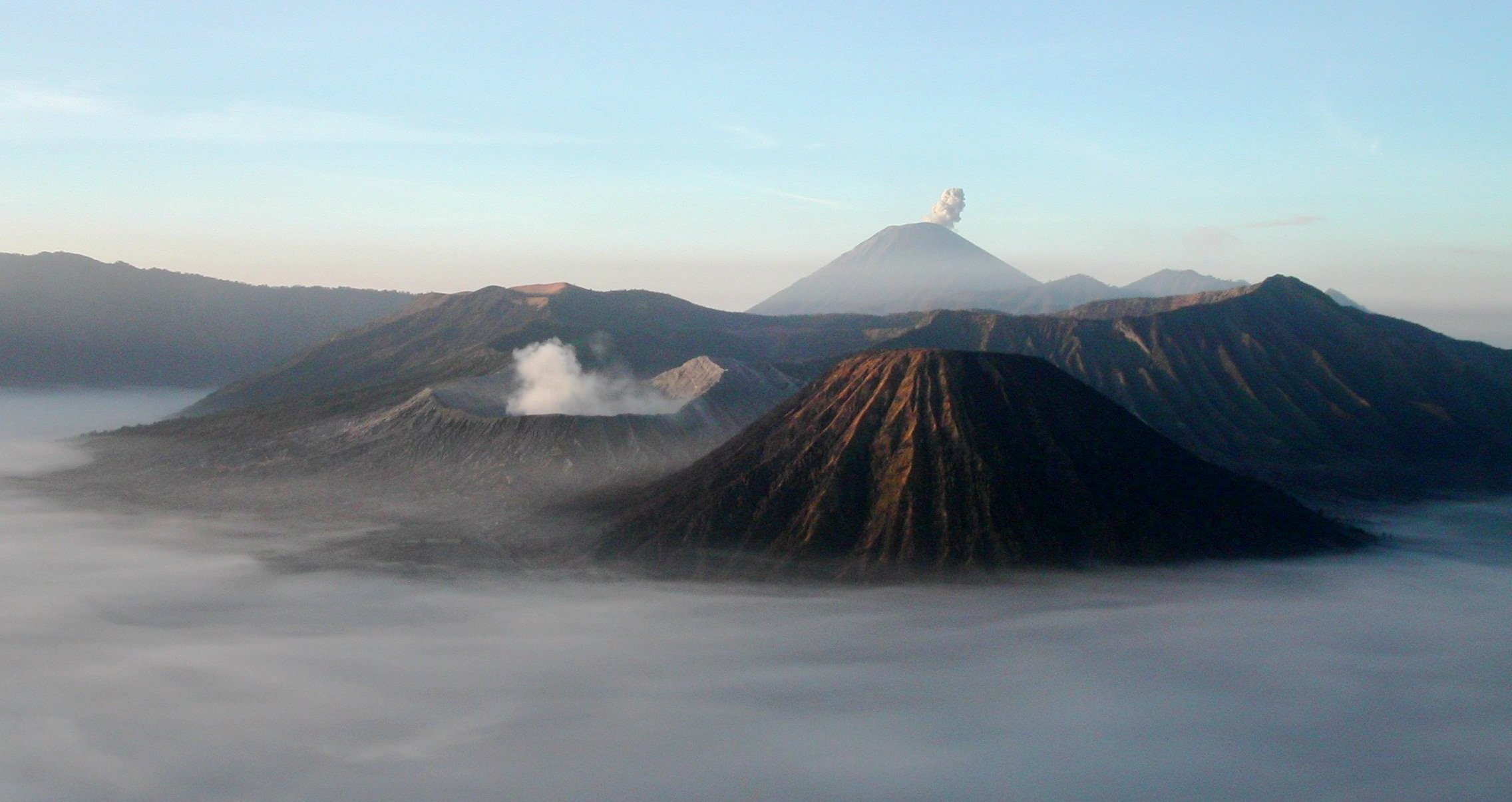
a photo of Mount Bromo, with Mount Semeru in background

Babad Blambangan, is a generic title for various manuscripts that tell the story of the kings of the Blambangan Kingdom and their successors, spanning from the 17th century to the19th century. These manuscript were possibly written in the 19th century.

== Structure ==
Babad Blambangan was written in four different type of script which is javanese Script, pegon script, balinese script and Latin script. These manuscript have six topic consist of Wilis, Sembar, Tawang Alun, Bayu, Mas Sepuh, dan Notodiningrat.

=== Babad Wilis ===
This manuscript put Wong Agung Wilis as the main character which possibly written 1773 and 1774. The writer is Purwasastra a Javanese Muslim who lived in Banger which now called by name Probolinggo and commissioned by Jayanegara, the Regent of Banger. Jayanegara was portrayed as someone who is vigilant, kind, and wise whom the Dutch have a good opinion of him cause of his loyalty. At first, Purwasastra wanted to reject this request, but the reason is still unknown.

=== Babad Sembar ===
This text was possibly created in the late 18th or early 19th century. The timing is around the period when Blambangan had already lost much of its former importance following the Dutch takeover in the 1760s and 1770s and the erosion of the Hinduism religion in the region. Though the author remains unknown, there is a strong possibility that the author was Balinese as suggested by the point of view and the presence of Balinese figures in the story. Especial considering during that time, Probolinggo was ruled by regents from Prabalingga, who claimed descent from Buleleng, a side-branch of the Blambangan royal house.

However, Wisnu, lecturer from State University of Surabaya suggested that the writer might be Kertajaya, a descendant of Lanang Dangiran from Surabaya who served as a regent of Probolinggo at that time. The texts is consisted of 365 strophe which recount the history of about seven generation of the Blambangan Kingdom especially their relation with the ruler of Probolinggo. The texts tells about famous figures such as Menak Pentor who ruled in 1513 and Prabu Tawang Alun II who died in 1691 which offer anchor points to construct a timeline of East Java history. However, the Babad Sembar's reliance on oral traditions and its anachronistic treatment of certain events mean that its historical accuracy is often debated.

=== Babad Tawangalun ===
The author is still unknown, but the manuscript was possibly created around 1826/1827 and written in Banyuwangi based on Winarsih Patraningrat Arifin. Although, Jan Laurens Andries Brandes suggested that these manuscript created around 1832-1841. The manuscript told story about the history about kings of Blambangan which started by Prince of Kedhawung in the 17th century which spanned for two centuries.

=== Babad Bayu ===
The manuscript was written by Wiraleksana in Panarukan. Wiraleksana himself was a trader from Pajarakan. The manuscript told story about the war that happened between Jagapati and Dutch colonial empire around 1771-1772.
