= Kemenuh Butterfly Park =

- Interactive map of Kemenuh Butterfly Park
- 8°33′55″S 115°16′56″E
- Location: Kemenuh, Sukawati, Gianyar, Bali, Indonesia
- Website: www.kemenuhbutterflypark.com

Kemenuh Butterfly Park is a park with butterflies in Kemenuh, Sukawati, Gianyar, Bali, Indonesia. It is located among rice fields.

This park focuses on conservation and education as well as being an attraction for tourists and locals to enjoy.

The endangered kupu-kupu barong moth is found at the cocoon house in this park.
