= Dalem Bekung =

King of Bali from Kepakisan Dynasty

Ida Dalem Pemayun Bekung
- Ida Dalem Sri Aji Pemayun Kepakisan; Ida Dalem Bekung; Ida Dalem Pemayun
- Reign: Saka Year 1473 - 1505 (1551 - 1582 AD)
- Predecessor: Sri Aji Wijaya Kepakisan (Dalem Baturenggong)
- Successor: Sri Aji Anom Segening Kepakisan (Dalem Seganing)
- Burial: Deified in a five-tiered Meru shrine at Pura Pedharman Sri Aji Kresna Kepakisan
- Spouse: Ni Gusti Ayu Samuantiga
- Issue: Sri Dewi Pemayun
- Dynasty: Kepakisan
- Father: Sri Aji Wijaya Kepakisan
- Mother: Ni Dewi Ayu Pemayun
- Religion: Hindu - Buddhist

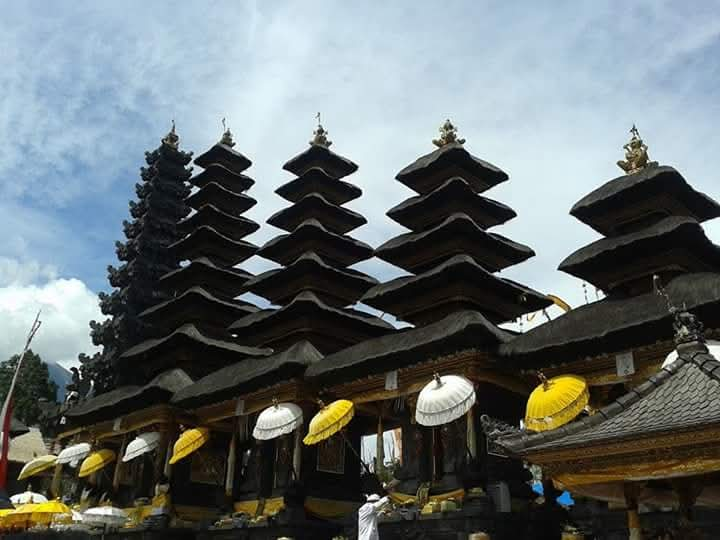
Meru Pedharman of Dalem Kresna Kepakisan and His Descendants

Ida Dalem Pemayun, also known as Dalem Pemayun Bekung or Sri Aji Pemayun Kepakisan, was the fifth King of Bali from the Kepakisan dynasty who ruled the Gelgel Kingdom from 1551 to 1582 AD. He was the son of Dalem Waturenggong and the heir to the Gelgel Kingdom throne.

A Dutch crew which landed in Kuta was noted as being impressed by Dalem Bekung's military size crossing the Bali Strait.

== See also ==
- History of Bali
- List of monarchs of Bali
- Gelgel, Indonesia

| Preceded by Dalem Baturenggong | King of Bali; 1551-1582 | Succeeded by Dalem Seganing |
