= Mataram–Blambangan wars =

- Part of Spread of Islam in Indonesia
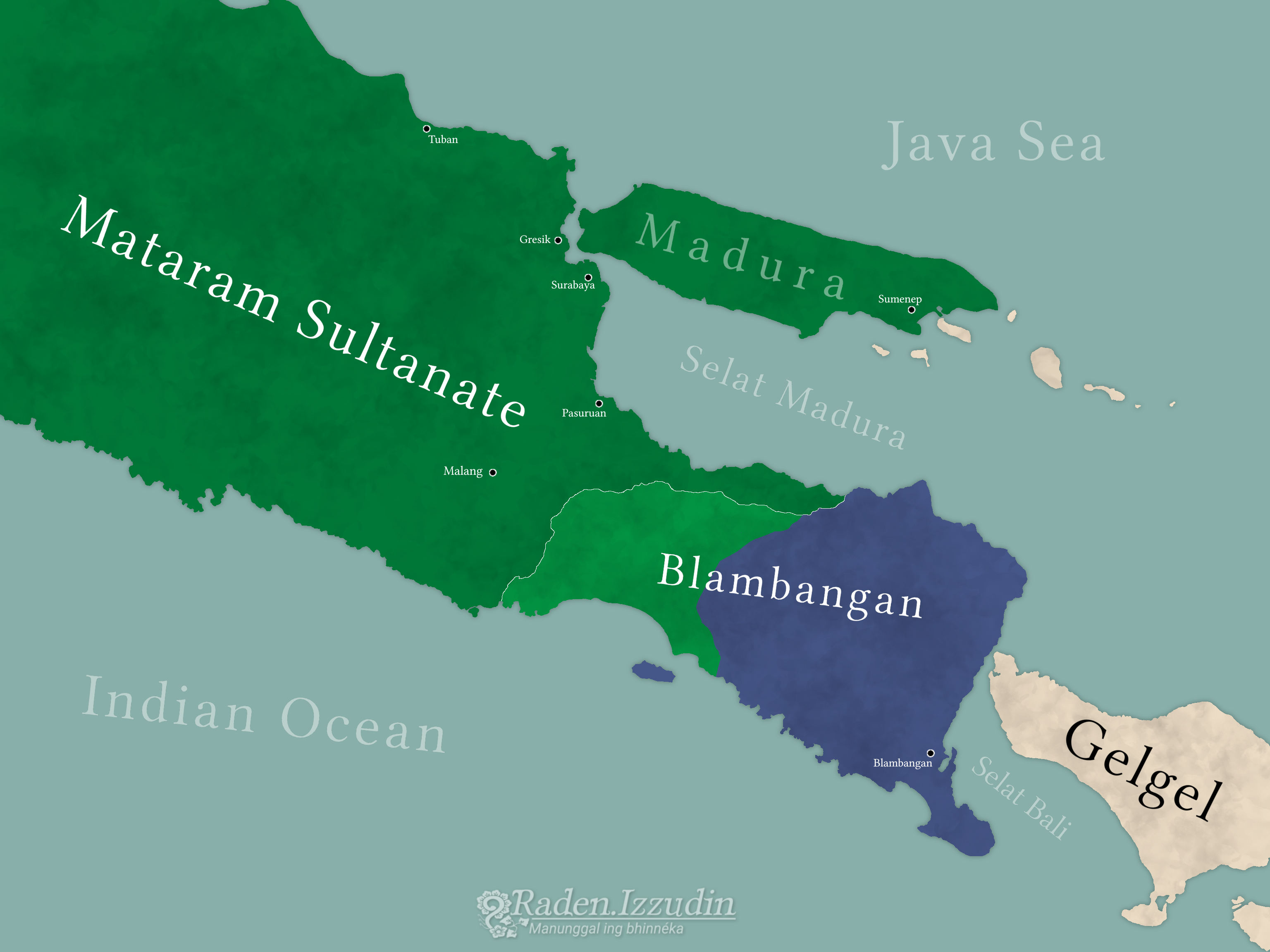
- Blambangan-Mataram borders
| Date | 1639–1659 |
| Location | Blambangan, East Java |
| Result | Blambangan victory; Islamic expansion in Bali prevented; Blambangan regained their independence |
| Territorial changes | Blambangan becomes the vassal of Mataram for a while and some Blambangan territories were annexed.; Blambangan regains independence in 1659 |

Belligerents
| Mataram Sultanate | Blambangan Kingdom; Kingdom of Gelgel |

Commanders and leaders
| Sultan Agung # Amangkurat I | Tawang Alun I Tawang Alun II |

Strength
| Unknown | Unknown |

Casualties and losses
| Unknown | Unknown |

The Mataram–Blambangan wars occurred intermittently from 1639 to 1659, between the Mataram Sultanate and the Blambangan Kingdom in East Java.

== History ==
Sultan Agung sought to expand Mataram's territory, leading to a conflict with the Hindu kingdom of Blambangan, which had ties to the Balinese kingdom of Gelgel. Though Mataram had some success, the Blambagans regained independence by 1659 after Mataram's forces withdrew. This war was part of the broader power struggles over Java between Islamic and Hindu states.
