= Dalem Baturenggong =

King of Bali from Gegel Dynasty

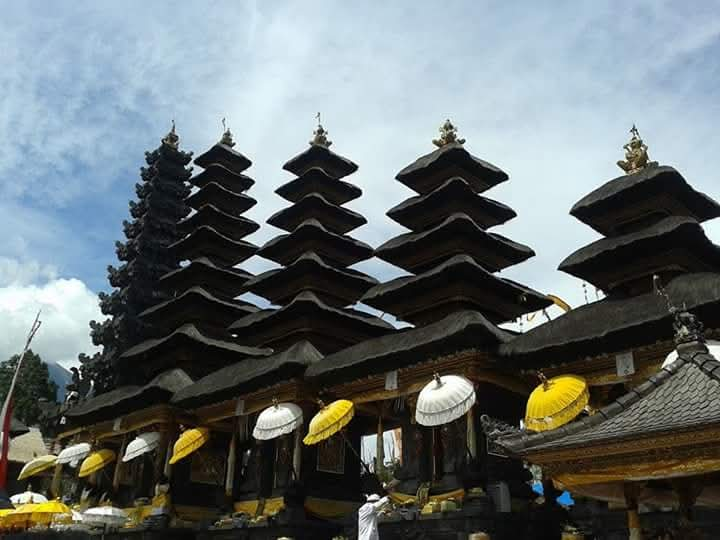
Meru Pedharman of Dalem Kresna Kepakisan and his descendants

Sri Dalem Batu Renggong, also known as Ida Dalem Waturenggong or Sri Aji Wijaya Kepakisan, was the fourth King of Bali from the Kepakisan Dynasty who ruled the Kingdom of Gelgel from 1459 to 1550. He reigned for 90 years and was the longest-reigning Balinese king. His reign is regarded as the golden age of the Balinese Kingdom. During this era, Bali expanded its influence over Blambangan, Sumbawa, and Lombok.

== See also ==
- History of Bali
- List of monarchs of Bali
- Gelgel, Indonesia

| Preceded by Dalem Ketut | King of Bali; 1459 - 1550 | Succeeded by Dalem Bekung |
