= Dewa Pacekan =

Prince of Bali

Dewa Pacekan was a prince on the Island of Bali, who possibly ruled the island kingdom for a short time, in 1642–1650. He belonged to a dynasty stemming from the Majapahit Empire of Java, which had its palace (puri) in Gelgel, near Bali's south coast. According to Balinese historiography he was the second son of king Dalem Di Made, who may have died in 1642. In Dutch sources from the 1630s, he appears to be mentioned as 'Patiekan' or 'Paadjakan', son of the current ruler. In the religious text Rajapurana Besakih, he is listed as the last deified ancestor of the Gelgel dynasty. He may therefore have succeeded Dalem Di Made, although later Balinese historical texts do not actually mention him as ruler in his own right. One text mentions that he directed his troops against the army of the Javanese Muslim Mataram kingdom in 1646. This confrontation is also described in Dutch and Javanese sources. His death is placed by Balinese texts in 1650. Dutch sources relate that the Dutch East Indies Company sent an embassy to Bali in 1651, but found on arrival that the unnamed king had recently died, and that chaotic internecine wars raged on the island.

== See also ==
- History of Bali
- List of monarchs of Bali
- Gelgel, Indonesia

Preceded by Dalem Di Made	King of Bali; 1642–1650	Succeeded by Dewa Cawu
