= Semarajaya Museum =

Museum in Bali, Indonesia

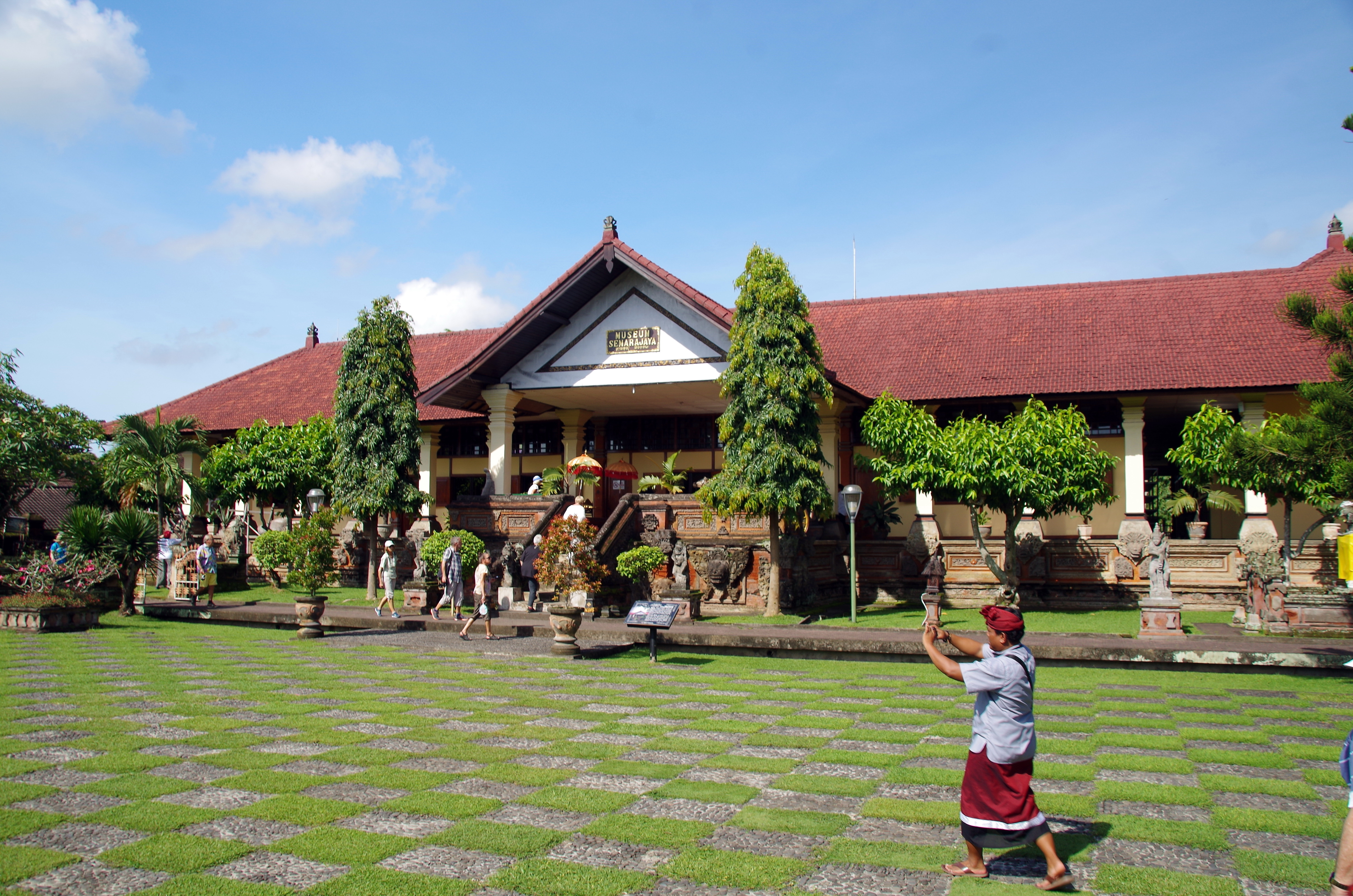
- Museum in 2018

- Location within Bali Location within Indonesia Location within Southeast Asia
- Location: Klungkung, Bali, Indonesia
- Coordinates: 8°32′08″S 115°24′10″E

The Semarajaya Museum (Indonesian: Museum Semarajaya; Balinese: ᬫᬸᬲᬾᬳᬸᬫ᭄ᬲᭂᬫᬭᬚᬬ; Dutch: Semaradjaja Museum) is a museum located in the town of Semarapura in Klungkung Regency on Bali, Indonesia. The inauguration of the Semarajaya Museum was held on April 28, 1992 by Rudini as the Minister of Home Affairs of the Republic of Indonesia. The Semarajaya Museum building implements a combination of Dutch and Balinese architecture styles.

The Semarajaya Museum collection consists of historical relics of the Klungkung Kingdom and prehistoric relics. The owner of the Semarajaya Museum is the Klungkung Regency Government, while the manager is the Department of Culture, Youth and Sports of Klungkung Regency.

The Semarajaya Museum is only open from Tuesday to Sunday and is closed on holidays and national holidays. The Klungkung Regency Government has held an activity called Bersamamu. In Bersamamu, students or community groups are guided around the Semarajaya Museum by museum guides. After that, visitors are guided to learn together with resource persons or instructors who are experts in the fields of history, art, fine arts, or folk games.

== Establishment and inauguration ==
The Semarajaya Museum building is the former Meer Uitgebreid Lager Onderwijs and Klungkung Junior High School I. The construction period began on April 28, 1908 by the Dutch Government after the fall of the Klungkung Kingdom by Dutch troops. This building was built in Pamedal Agung in the Kertha Gosa Complex or Taman Gili. Pamedal Agung is the former door of the Klungkung Kingdom palace. The Semarajaya Museum was built with a combination of Dutch architectural style and traditional Balinese architectural styles.

On April 28, 1992, the Semarajaya Museum was inaugurated by Minister of Home Affairs of the Republic of Indonesia, namely Rudini. The establishment of the Semarajaya Museum aims to commemorate the Puputan Klungkung War which took place on April 28, 1908 between Dutch troops and the troops of Ida Dewa Agung Jambe who had been the King of Klungkung since 1904.

== Location ==
Address of Semarajaya Museum at Jalan Untung Suropati Number 3, Semarapura, Klungkung Regency, Bali Province. The coordinates of the Semarajaya Museum are 8°32’05.4” South Latitude and 115°24’09.8” East Longitude.

== Ownership and management ==
The Klungkung Regency Government is the owner of the Semarajaya Museum. Meanwhile, the management of the Semarajaya Museum is handed over to the Department of Culture, Youth and Sports of Klungkung Regency. The Klungkung Regency Government has determined the implementation of Learning Together at the Semarajaya Museum Klungkung (Bersamamu) as a regional innovation of Klungkung Regency. The implementer is the Department of Culture, Youth and Sports of Klungkung Regency. Bersamamu is a form of public service that brings school students, students, college students, or community groups to the Semarajaya Museum to learn together. The purpose of Bersamamu is to introduce the Semarajaya Museum as a means of education, culture and tourism. In Bersamamu, Semarajaya Museum officers guide visitors around the museum. Then resource persons or instructors guide visitors to learn together about art and culture. The resource persons or instructors presented have expertise in the fields of history, art, fine arts, or folk games, among others.

== Visiting hours ==
The Semarajaya Museum is only open from Tuesday to Sunday. While on national holidays or holidays, the Semarajaya Museum is closed. The opening hours of the Semarajaya Museum start at 07.00 to 18.00 WITA. The location of the Semarajaya Museum can be reached from Ngurah Rai Airport with a distance of 44.4 km.

== See also ==
- List of museums and cultural institutions in Indonesia

== Literature ==
- Direktori Museum Indonesia (PDF). Jakarta: Sekretariat Direktorat Jenderal Kebudayaan. 2012.
- Lenzi, Iola (2004). Museums of Southeast Asia. Singapore: Archipelago Press. ISBN 981-4068-96-9.
- Rusmiyati; et al. (2018). Katalog Museum Indonesia Jilid II (PDF). Direktorat Pelestarian Cagar Budaya dan Permuseuman. ISBN 978-979-8250-67-5.
