= Anglurah Agung =

King Gelgel of Bali

Anglurah Agung (died 31 October 1686), also known as Gusti Agung Di Made or Gusti Agung Maruti, was a king of Gelgel, the paramount kingdom on Bali, who ruled at a time when the political unity of the island began to break down. This ultimately resulted in Bali's permanent division into several smaller kingdoms by the late 17th century.

== Background and rise ==
Anglurah Agung belonged to a hereditary line of chief ministers in the Balinese kingdom, the Agung family, which claimed descent from the ancient kings of Kediri on Java. He was the son of Gusti Agung Kalanganyar, and was adopted as an infant by his uncle Gusti Agung Kedung, whom he succeeded as minister. He is also known by the names Gusti Agung Di Made or Gusti Agung Maruti. He governed in the age of the Gelgel king Dalem Di Made. Certain Balinese texts indicate that he was involved in warfare on Lombok in 1645; this island was a bone of contention between Bali and the Makassar kingdom of South Sulawesi. After the death of a Balinese king in 1651, internal wars flared up on Bali. Eventually Anglurah Agung usurped power in Gelgel, and is documented as ruler from 1665. According to Balinese sources he took command at a point when the old king had lost his grip on state affairs and was deserted by his grandees; "Kyayi (Anglurah) Agung's statemanship had captured the hearts of many people with his sweet voice and fine words". He briefly entertained contacts with the Dutch East Indies Company (Vereenigde Oost-Indische Compagnie or VOC) in 1665–1667. Balinese historiography holds a negative view of Anglurah Agung and portrays him as a power-hungry usurper.

== Death in battle ==
It seems that he was unable to maintain authority over entire Bali, since other small kingdoms arose at the time, foremost among them Buleleng. In the 1680s a number of aristocrats loyal to the old dynasty of Gelgel, including Gusti Panji Sakti of Buleleng and Gusti Jambe Pule of Badung, attacked the rule of Anglurah Agung. According to Balinese as well as Dutch sources, his end came in 1686, when he fought a battle in Gelgel against the nobleman Batu Lepang. In the heat of the battle, both combatants fell. After his death, the scion of the old Gelgel line, Dewa Agung Jambe I (r. 1686-c. 1722), was established as Balinese paramount king in Klungkung, north of Gelgel. However, the new Klungkung kingdom proved unable to wield power over Bali in the way that its predecessor in Gelgel had done. Bali therefore remained split in a number of princedoms (Karangasem, Buleleng, Badung, etc.). One of these new dynasties, that of Mengwi, claimed descent from Anglurah Agung.

== See also ==
- History of Bali
- List of monarchs of Bali

Preceded by Dewa Cawu	King of Bali c. 1665-1686	Succeeded by Dewa Agung Jambe I
