= Dalem Di Made =

17th-century King of Bali

Dalem Di Made was a king of Bali who may have reigned in the period 1623–1642. He belonged to a dynasty that claimed descent from the Majapahit Empire of Java, and kept residence in Gelgel, close to Bali's south coast.

== Reign ==
Dalem Di Made was one of the fourteen sons of the ruler Dalem Seganing. After the death of the former, dated 1623 in one source, he succeeded to the throne of Gelgel. The main source for his reign, the Babad Dalem, is a work from the 18th century, and the account of his reign is not entirely coherent. The Babad Dalem praises the royal splendour of his court in glowing terms, and provides a wealth of details about the noblemen tied to his court. Another historical text, Babad Ratu Tabanan, provides details about a military expedition to Java in his reign. The Balinese army, led by the vassal lord Gusti Wayahan Pamedekan, was met by Sultan Agung of Mataram (r. 1613–1646) and was decisively defeated.

== Loss of power ==
The last section of the Babad Dalem relates that the powers of the king eventually declined, and that various noblemen left Gelgel. The chief minister of the king, Anglurah Agung (d. 1686), usurped power, and the old ruler was forced to flee to the highland village Guliang in the modern Bangli regency, where he finally died. Loyal aristocrats were later on able to support his two sons and defeat Anglurah Agung. A new royal palace was built in Klungkung (Semarapura), four kilometers north of the old Gelgel residence. The eldest son of the deceased king, Dewa Agung Jambe I, was established as ruler, but unlike his predecessors he was unable to wield power over entire Bali. The island was in effect split up in nine autonomous kingdoms, a situation that would endure until the 19th century.

== External accounts of reign ==
From non-Balinese sources it is known that the Gelgel kingdom still made claims over Blambangan in East Java, Lombok, and Sumbawa (including its eastern part, Bima), in the 1630s. The Dutch East Indies Company (Vereenigde Oost-Indische Compagnie or VOC) tried to gain Gelgel as a political ally against the Muslim Mataram kingdom in 1633, which failed. Later, Bali fought a series of wars on its own with Mataram over the possession of Blambangan, in 1635-1647. In the end, the Balinese influence over Blambangan prevailed. According to VOC sources, the death of a Gelgel ruler in 1651 led to internal conflicts on Bali. Later on, from 1665, the Dutch entertained contacts with a new lord of Gelgel, Anglurah Agung of the Balinese accounts. This Anglurah Agung is mentioned by both Balinese and Dutch texts as having been killed in battle in 1686. The actual date of death of Dalem Di Made is in doubt. A number of Balinese sources give the date 1642. It has also been suggested that he was the ruler who died in 1651, or that his reign ended as late as c. 1665. He is the first Gelgel ruler who is mentioned by name in a Dutch source, since the Balinese prince Raja Sangsit, who settled in Batavia in 1687, claimed to be his nephew.

== Family ==
Dalem Di Made had seven consorts: 1-2. Ni Gusti Peling (being two twin sisters); 3. Ni Gusti Pacekan, daughter of Kiyayi di Ler; 4. Ni Gusti Tangkeban, daughter of Gusti Agung; 5. Ni Gusti Selat, daughter of Gusti Kamasan; 6. a daughter of Ki Dukuh Suladri; and 7. a daughter of Gusti Jambe Pule of Badung. He sired nine sons; eight of these are enumerated in the Babad Dalem. Later sources mention still another son, Dewa Agung Jambe, who later became the first ruler of Klungkung in 1686.

- Dewa Pambahyun
- Dewa Pacekan
- Dewa Ketut
- Dewa Budi
- Dewa Bukian
- Dewa Tampwagan.
- Dewa Batan Nyambu
- Dewa Gianyar.
- Dewa Agung Jambe I, King of Klungkung

== See also ==
- History of Bali
- List of monarchs of Bali
- Gelgel, Indonesia

Preceded by Dalem Seganing	King of Bali; 1623-1642	Succeeded by Dewa Pacekan
