= Gusti Panji Sakti =

Gusti Panji Sakti was King of the Kingdom of Buleleng, in northern Bali, Indonesia, from around 1660 to 1700. He is commemorated as an heroic ancestral figure who expanded the power of Buleleng to Blambangan on East Java. He is said to have been the son of Dalem Seganing, a ruler of the powerful Gelgel dynasty in southern Bali in the 1580’s, linking him to the royal bloodlines of classical Balinese Hindu kingship. This lineage helped legitimize his authority in Buleleng and added to his legacy as a revered ancestral figure.
