= Kemenuh =

- Village
- Location in Bali and Indonesia Kemenuh (Indonesia)
- Coordinates: 8°33′31.932″S 115°17′12.84″E
- Country: Indonesia
- Province: Bali
- Regency: Gianyar
- Town: Sukawati

Area
  - Total: 7.34 km^{2} (2.83 sq mi)

Population (2014)
  - Total: 11,779
- Time zone: UTC+8 (ICST)
- Postal code: 80582
- Area code: (+62) 361

Kemenuh is a village on the Indonesian island of Bali in the town of Sukawati, Gianyar Regency.

== Nature ==
Tegenungan Waterfall is located in Kemenuh.
