= Wong Agung Wilis =

King of Blambangan
- Reign: First Period 1763-1764; Second Period 1767-1768
- Predecessor: Menak Seruyu / Tawang Alun I
- Successor: Position abolished
- Born: Pangeran Putra II; 1680/1720; Blambangan, (Current) Banyuwangi
- Died: 1780; Bali
- Father: Pangeran Mas Purba (Pangeran Putra I)
- Mother: Putri kerajaan Mengwi
- Religion: Hindu

Wong Agung Wilis born with the name Pangeran Putra II (born in Blambangan around the 1680s to 1720s – died in Bali in 1780) was the last ruler of Blambangan who ruled during the period 1763-1764 and 1767-1768. He led troops in the resistance against the VOC in Blambangan in 1768.

== Early life ==
=== Family ===
Prince Putra II was the son of Prince Mas Purba (Prince Putra I) alias Prabu Danureja, ruler of Blambangan from 1697-1736.

His mother was a daughter of Puri Kabakaba one of the vassals of Benwi Kingdom, Bali. Prince Putra II's mother was not the queen consort of Prince Danureja. Their second marriage occurred because of political motives so that cooperation between Blambangan and Bali could be strengthened to overcome the threat from the VOC

The consort of Prince Danureja himself was Mas Ayu Gading, the daughter of the hero Untung Surapati. Prince Danureja's marriage to the empress only resulted in a son named Mas Noyang (Prince Danuningrat) who would later inherit the throne of Blambangan (1736-1763).

When he was an adult, Prince Putra II moved to Bali, joining his uncle, Ki Gusti Ngurah Ketut Kaba-Kaba.

There is no history regarding who he married, but he had six sons, namely Mas Serutadi, Mas Kencling, Mas Tunjung, Mas Berud, Dalem Puger Mas Surawijaya and Mas Ayu Prabu.
