= Semarapura =

- Town

Native transcription(s)
  - Balinese: ᬲᭂᬫᬭᬧᬸᬭ
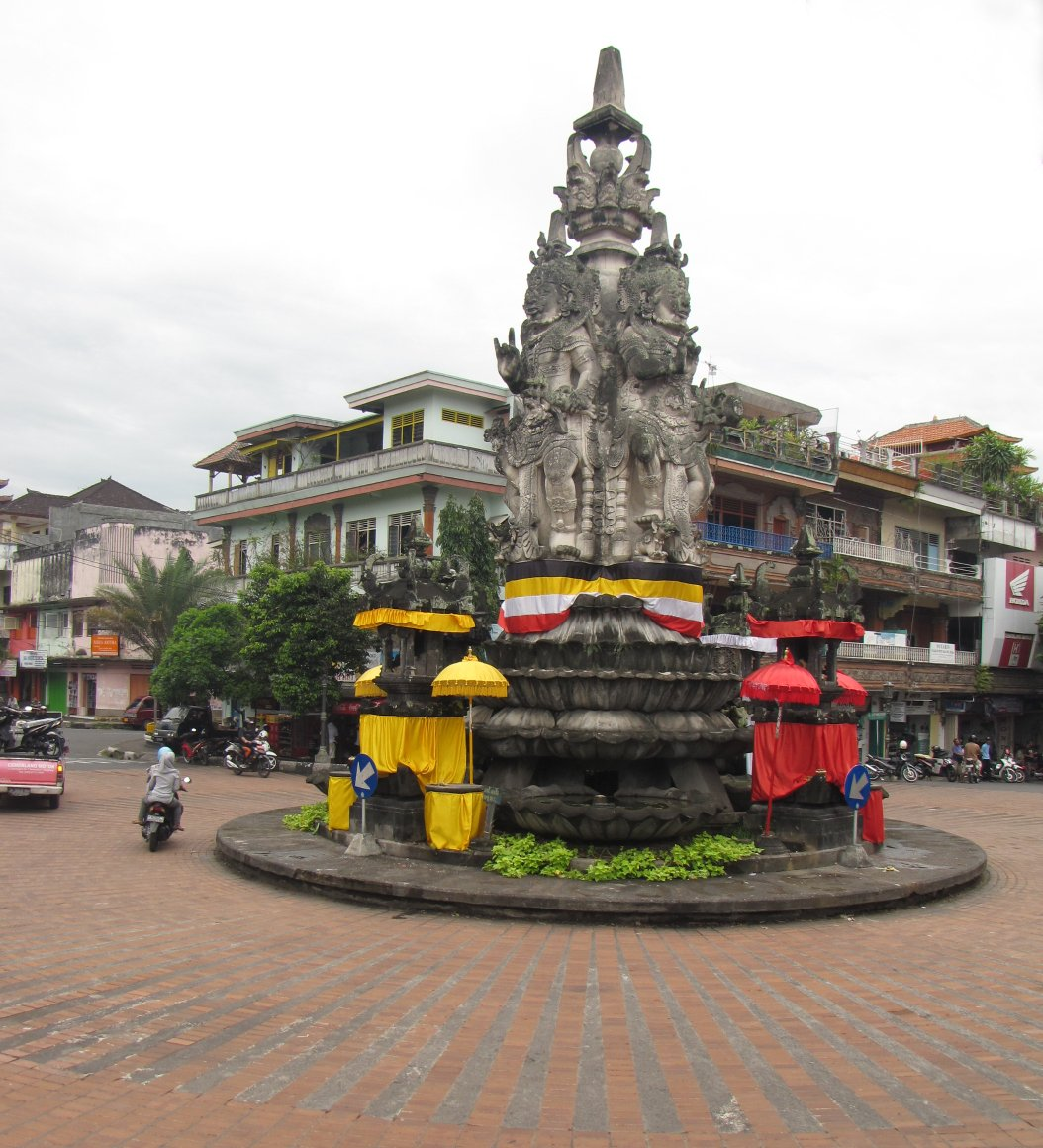
- Sari Statue, Semarapura

- Location in Bali
- Coordinates: 8°32′7″S 115°24′13″E
- Country: Indonesia
- Province: Bali
- Regency: Klungkung Regency
- District: Klungkung District

Area
  - Total: 548 km^{2} (212 sq mi)

Population (2021)
  - Total: 26,269
  - Density: 4,794/km^{2} (12,420/sq mi)
- Time zone: UTC+8 (WITA)

Semarapura (Balinese: ᬲᭂᬫᬭᬧᬸᬭ; pronounced [səmaraˈpura]) is a town that serves as the administrative capital of the Klungkung Regency in Bali, Indonesia. It is also the center of government and economy of Klungkung Regency. This city has no administrative status and its territory is in Klungkung district. Semarapura is the center of the regency government which is also known as the source of arts and culture in Bali.

== Administrative territory ==
There are 6 sub-districts (kelurahan )included in the Semarapura area, namely:

1. Semarapura Kaja
2. Semarapura Kangin
3. Semarapura Kauh
4. Semarapura Klod
5. Semarapura Klod Kangin
6. Central Semarapura

== History ==
The area now called Semapura used to be the center of the Klungkung Kingdom. Semarapura was founded by the first King of Klungkung, namely Ida Dewa Agung Jambe I, a prince of the Gelgel Kingdom which collapsed due to the rebellion of the King's own Prime Minister

After Ida Dewa Agung Jambe I succeeded in capturing Gelgel in 1686 AD from the hands of the rebels, he then founded the city of Semarapura in the northern area of Gelgel. That was the year Semarapura was built. Another version states that Klungkung was a defense base of Ida Dewa Agung Jambe I during the war against Gusti Agung Maruti, since the founding of the Republic of Indonesia Semarapura was renamed Klungkung City but to pay respect to history and also as a self-identity, Klungkung City was proposed to be changed back to Semarapura as it had been built by Ida Dewa Agung Jambe I.

Klungkung City was also changed and its name was officially made Semarapura City on April 28, 1992, by the Minister of Home Affairs, Rudini based on Government Regulation (PP) No. 18 of 1992. Furthermore, every April 28 is designated as Puputan Klungkung Day and the Anniversary of Semarapura City. The anniversary of Semarapura City also coincides with the inauguration of the Puputan Klungkung Monument.

== Demographic ==
In the year 2021, the population of Semarapura was 26,269 people. Based on the data Ministry of Home Affairs, Civil Registry 2021 notes that the people of Semarapura have a variety of religions adopted by the majority of religion Hindu. The percentage of the population of Semarapura according to the religion adopted is religion Hindu as many as 75.58%, then Islam 20.68%, Buddhist 1.88%, then Christianity, Confucian that is 0.03%.

== Tourism ==
Some tourist attractions in this area include:

- Kertha Gosa / gili garden
- Puputan Monument
- Semarajaya Museum
- Semarapura Art Market
- Klungkung Palace

== See also ==
Semarapura is the capital of Klungkung Regency, the smallest regency in the province of Bali, Indonesia. It also serves as the administrative centre of Klungkung District (kecamatan) within the regency. Klungkung Regency borders with Bangli Regency in the north, Karangasem Regency in the east, Gianyar Regency in the west, and with the Indian Ocean to the south.

- Klungkung Palace

The Klungkung Palace is a historical landmark in the centre of the Klungkung Regency. Locally referred to as 'Puri Agung Semarapura' or the Royal Palace of Semarapura after the name of the town, the palace shares the same location as the unmissable and more popular Kerta Gosa or the 'Hall of Justice' complex, which lies just northeast of the palatial compound. Also around the complex is the Klungkung Regency cultural hall, as well as the Kerta Gosa Museum.

The Klungkung Palace grounds date back to the 17th century and are a silent witness to much of the history of East Bali, including the Dutch colonial intervention in 1908, which led to the fall of the kingdom and the deaths of most of the royal family

- Nyoman Gunarsa Museum

Nyoman Gunarsa Museum, locally referred to as Museum Seni Lukis Klasik, is the namesake private gallery of the late Balinese maestro, Nyoman Gunarsa. This Classic Art Museum was established in 1990 and houses a collection of his classical and contemporary Balinese artworks, ranging from paintings, sculptures, and antique items. The shape of the building in the Museum is a blend of modern Balinese architecture. The museum features 3 floors, 2 of which are the main galleries displaying collections of classical paintings of Bali, and the other is reserved for local and international guest artists' exhibiting mostly modern paintings of Bali.

It is located approximately 3 km from West Semarapura.

== Climate ==
Semarapura has a tropical rainforest climate (Af) with moderate to heavy rainfall year-round.

Climate data for Semarapura
Month	Jan	Feb	Mar	Apr	May	Jun	Jul	Aug	Sep	Oct	Nov	Dec	Year
Mean daily maximum °C (°F)	30.4 (86.7)	30.6 (87.1)	30.8 (87.4)	31.3 (88.3)	31.0 (87.8)	30.2 (86.4)	29.6 (85.3)	29.9 (85.8)	30.5 (86.9)	31.2 (88.2)	31.3 (88.3)	30.8 (87.4)	30.6 (87.1)
Daily mean °C (°F)	26.5 (79.7)	26.6 (79.9)	26.6 (79.9)	26.6 (79.9)	26.3 (79.3)	25.4 (77.7)	25.1 (77.2)	25.3 (77.5)	25.8 (78.4)	26.6 (79.9)	26.9 (80.4)	26.6 (79.9)	26.2 (79.1)
Mean daily minimum °C (°F)	22.7 (72.9)	22.7 (72.9)	22.4 (72.3)	21.9 (71.4)	21.6 (70.9)	20.7 (69.3)	20.6 (69.1)	20.7 (69.3)	21.2 (70.2)	22.0 (71.6)	22.5 (72.5)	22.5 (72.5)	21.8 (71.2)
Average rainfall mm (inches)	255 (10.0)	229 (9.0)	161 (6.3)	109 (4.3)	113 (4.4)	125 (4.9)	179 (7.0)	108 (4.3)	96 (3.8)	149 (5.9)	153 (6.0)	226 (8.9)	1,903 (74.8)
Source: Climate-Data.org

== Gallery ==
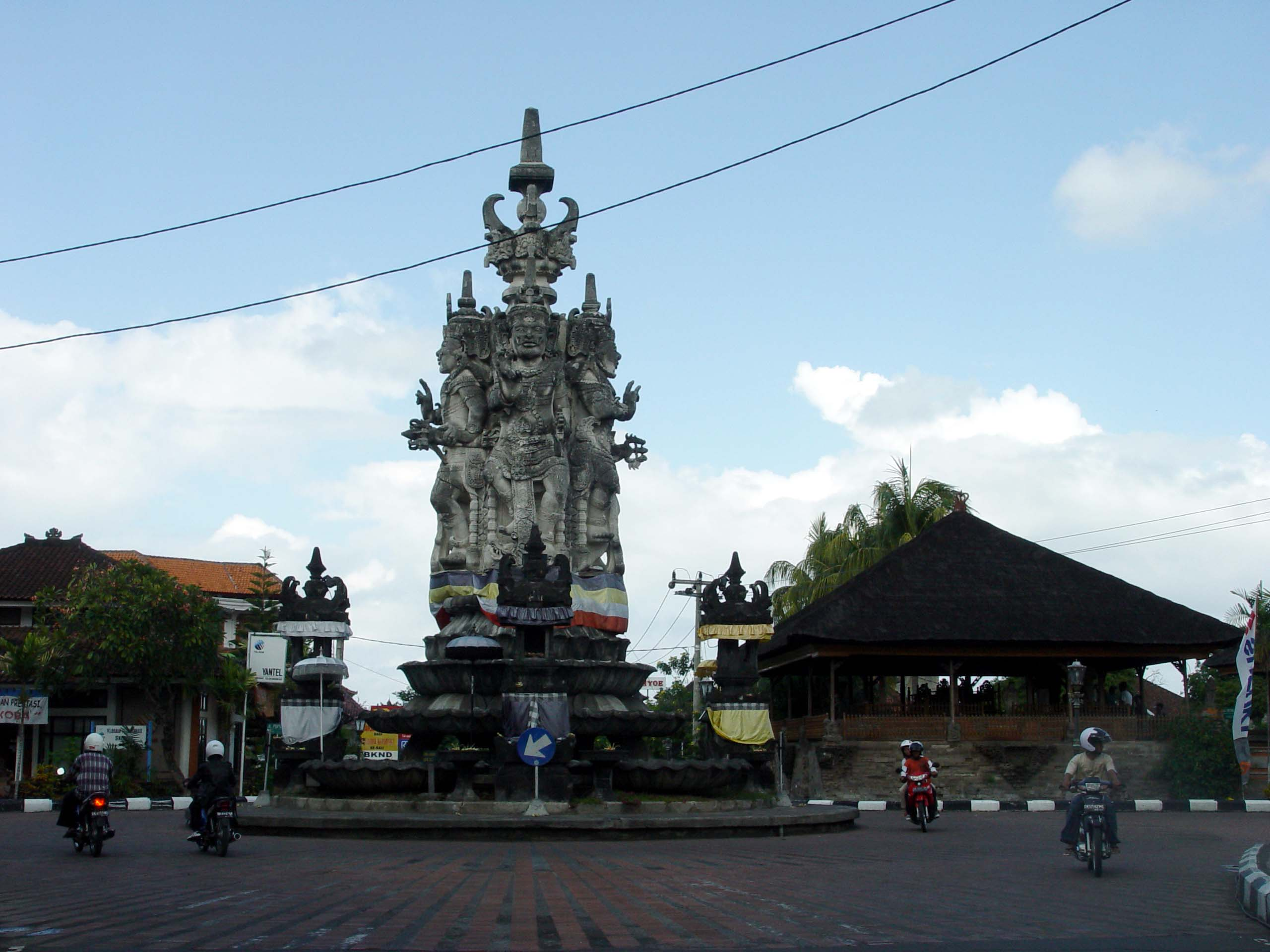
Monument in the center of the town

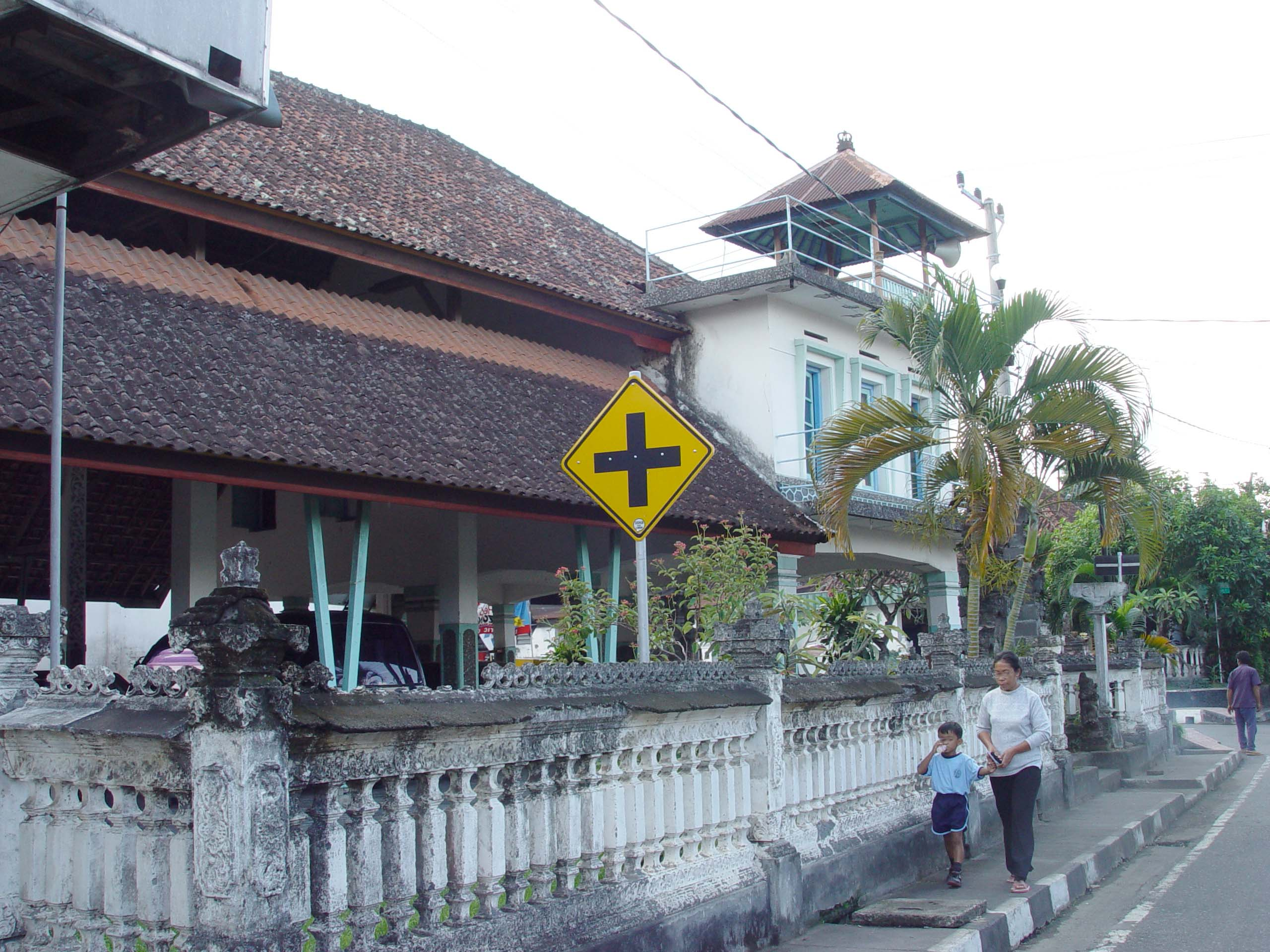
Street

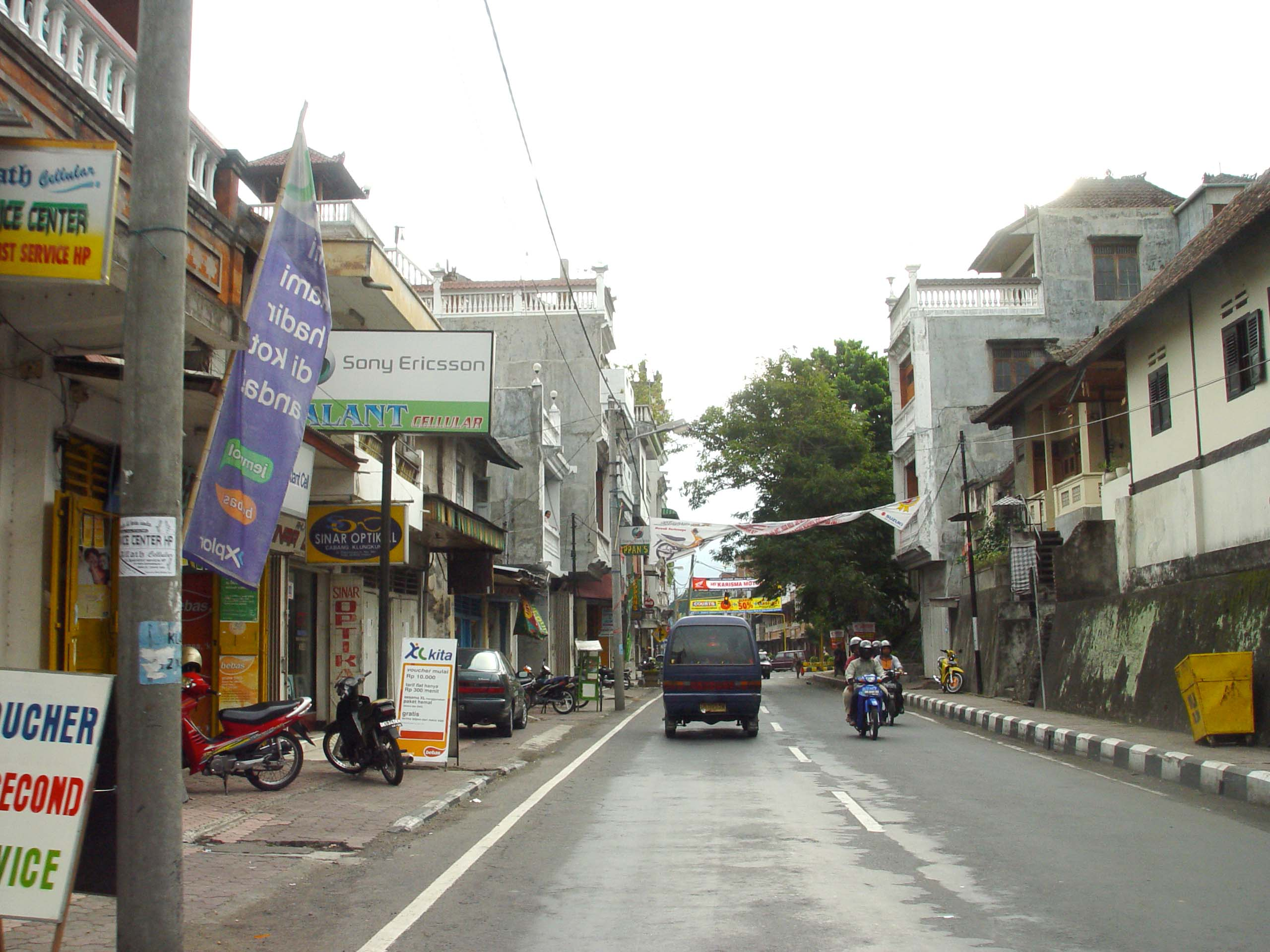
City side street
