= Sukawati =

District in Gianyar Regency, Bali Province, Indonesia

Location within Gianyar

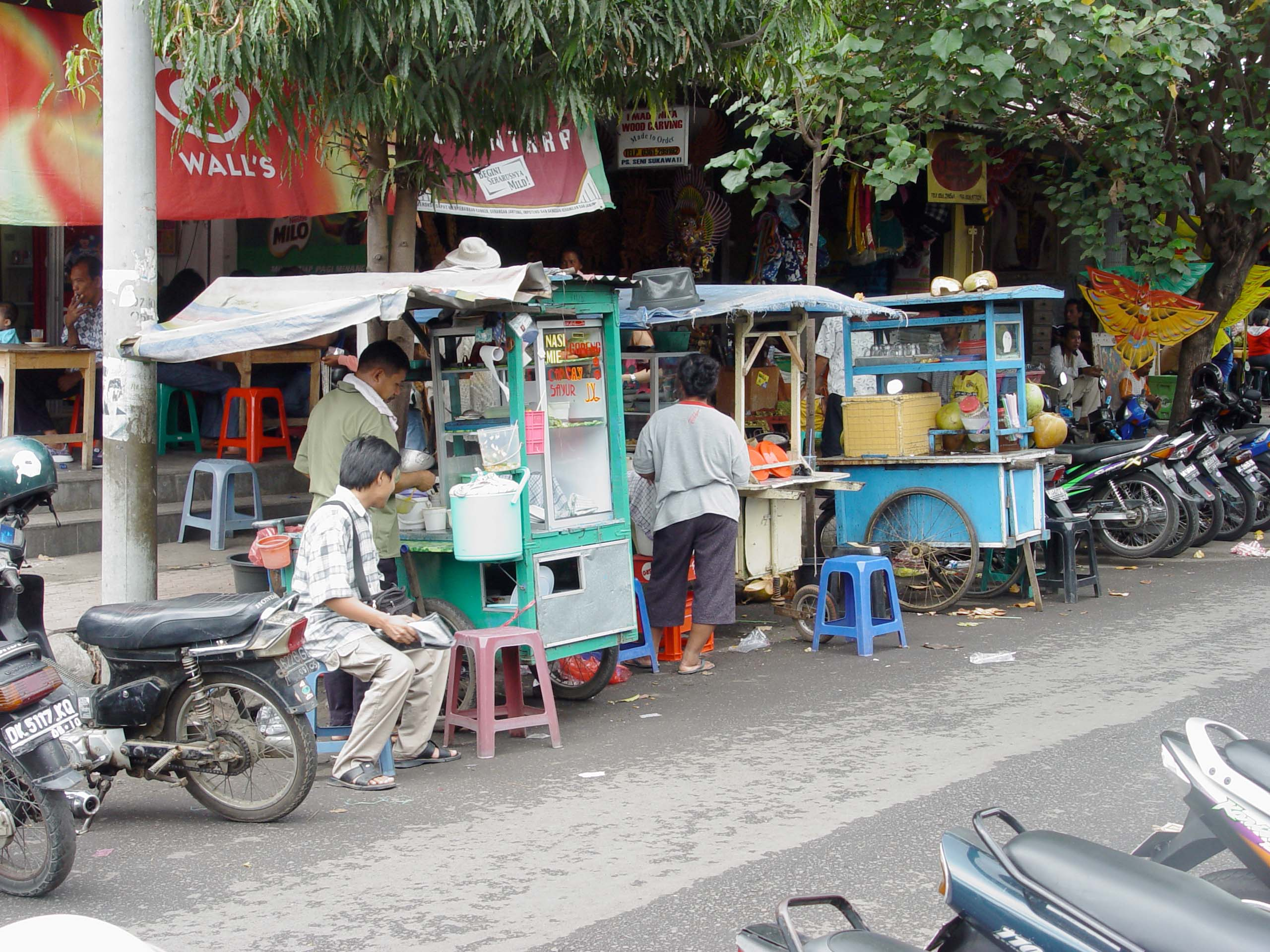
Street scene in Sukawati

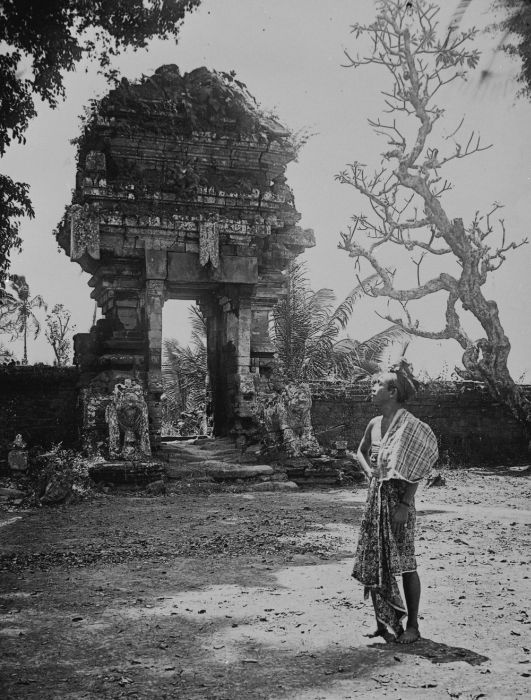
Temple ruins (1922)

Sukawati is a district in Gianyar Regency, Bali, Indonesia. As of the 2010 census, the area was 55.02 km^{2} and the population was 110,429; the latest official estimate (as at mid 2019) is 125,470.

The district of Sukawati includes the villages (urban Kelurahan and rural Desa) of Batuan, Batuan Kaler, Batubulan, Batubulan Kangin, Celuk, Guwang, Kemenuh, Ketewel, Singapadu, Singapadu Kaler, Singapadu Tengah and Sukawati.
