= Babad Dalem =

Babad Dalem is a historical account from Bali, Indonesia, which exists in a large number of versions of varying length. The title may be translated as "Chronicle of Kings", although the Balinese babad genre does not quite accord to Western-style chronicles. There are dated manuscripts from the early 19th century onwards, and the original version was very likely written in the course of the 18th century. The author was probably a Brahmin tied to the Klungkung Palace, the most prestigious of the nine pre-colonial royal seats of Bali.

The text is a blend of myth, legend and history, and traces the history of Balinese kingship back to the Javanese roots in the age of the Hindu-Buddhist Majapahit empire (1293-c. 1527). The forces of Gajah Mada, the chief minister (patih) of Majapahit, invade Bali and subjugate the island (an event dated in 1343 in the Javanese poem Nagarakrtagama). A Javanese nobleman called Sri Aji Kresna Kepakisan, the grandson of a Brahmin, is installed as the vassal ruler of Bali, with his residence in Samprangan in the Gianyar regency. In the next generation the seat of the raja is moved to Gelgel in the Klungkung regency, where a strong kingdom takes shape. The collapse of Majapahit on Java later on leaves Gelgel as the heir of the classical Javanese civilization. The account follows the fortunes of the Gelgel kingdom until its fall, historically dated in 1686.

A continuation of the Babad Dalem, sometimes called Babad Ksatria, follows the history of Klungkung, the successor kingdom of Gelgel. It was authored in the second half of the 19th century, with a later version including a brief account of the fall of Klungkung in 1908.

The great value of the Babad Dalem as a source of Balinese cultural values and perceptions of kingship is generally recognized by the scholars. Its value as a source of past events on Bali is controversial. The older versions contain few calendrical dates, and the babad genre seems more concerned with origins than with the exact chronology of events. Comparisons with external (in particular Dutch and Javanese) historical materials suggest that important aspects of the history of Gelgel have been left out or altered in the Babad Dalem.
