= Blambangan Kingdom =

Javanese Hindu kingdom (c. 13th-18th centuries CE)

Blambangan Kingdom ꦑꦫꦠꦺꦴꦤ꧀ꦨ꧀ꦭꦩ꧀ꦧꦔꦤ꧀
- 1478–1768 (Note: De jure)/1777 (Note: De facto)
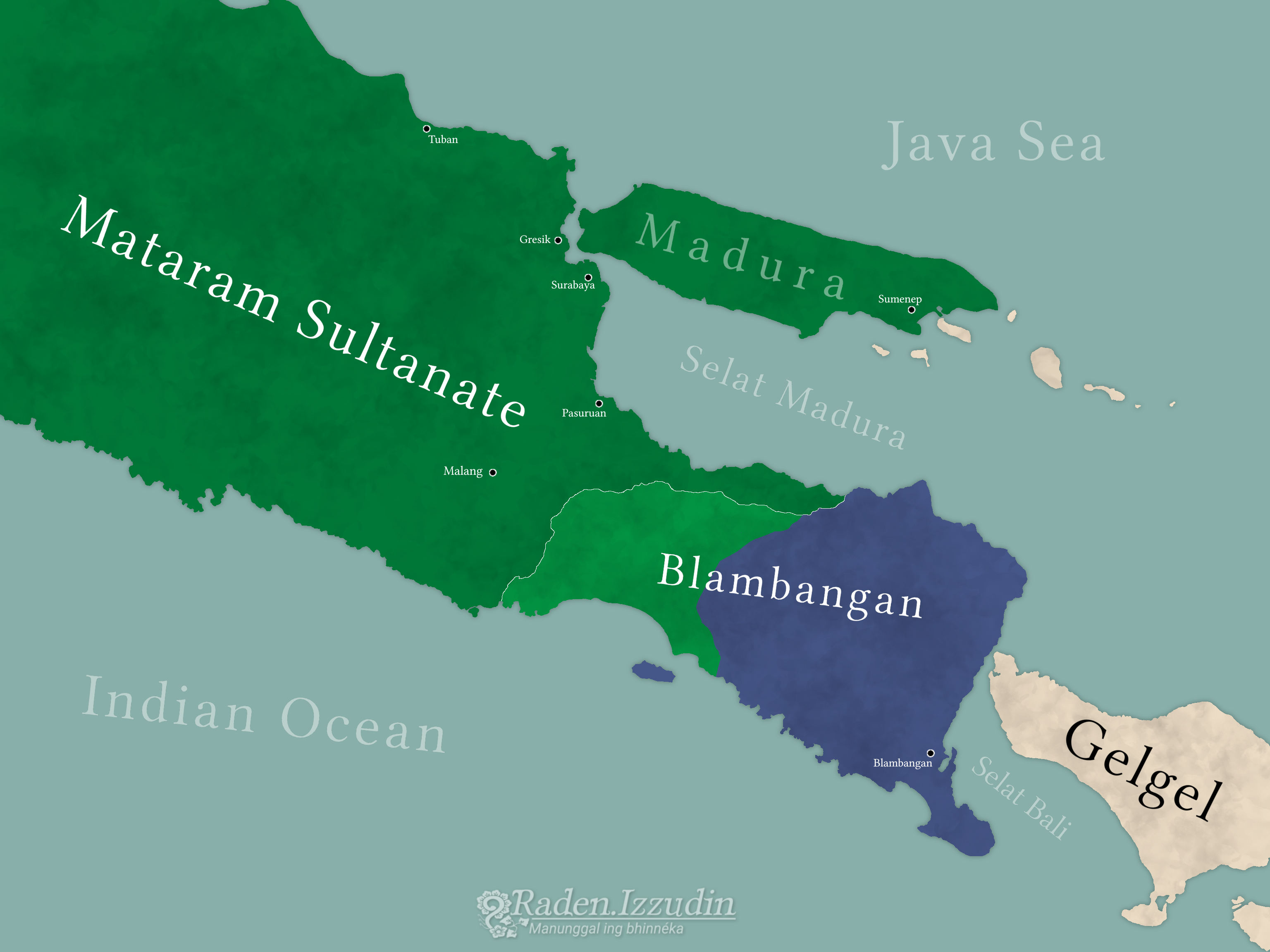
- Blambangan on the eastern tip of Java Island in the 16th century during the Mataram Sultanate era in Java
- Capital: Semboro (1478–1489); Lamajang (1489–1501); Kedawung (Menak Lumpat until Wilabrata period); Macanputih (Tawang Alun II period); Muncar (Prabu Danurejo until Pangeran Agung Wilis period); Lateng (IGNK Dewa Kabakaba period)
- Common languages: Old Javanese, Osing
- Religion: Hinduism (official); Buddhism; Islam
- Government: Monarchy
- Menak/Gusti/Susuhunan/Prabu
  - 1478–1489 (first): Mas Sembar
  - 1489–1501: Bima Koncar
  - 1501–1531: Menak Pentor
  - 1531–1546: Menak Pangseng
  - 1546–1601: Menak Pati
  - 1601–1633: Menak Lumpat
  - 1633–1647: Menak Seruyu / Tawang Alun I
  - 1763–1764 (First period) 1767–1768 (Second period): Wong Agung Wilis
- History
  - Dissolution of Majapahit led to an independent Blambangan: 1478
  - Blambangan was attacked by Balinese kingdom: 1501
  - Batara Wijaya Girindrawardhana Ranawijaya fled to Panarukan (Note: Blambangan region) after Daha was controlled by Demak Sultanate: 1527
  - Blambangan lost Pasuruan and Pajarakan because it was taken by Demak: 1545–1546
  - Blambangan became the vassal of Mataram Sultanate aftermath of the war: 1635–1639
  - Civil wars in Blambangan: 1691–1697
  - Absorbed into the territory of Dutch East Indies: 1768 (Note: De jure)/1777 (Note: De facto)
Preceded by	Succeeded by
Majapahit	Dutch East Indies
- Today part of: Indonesia: East Java

The Blambangan Kingdom (Indonesian: Kerajaan Blambangan, Javanese: ꦑꦫꦠꦺꦴꦤ꧀ꦨ꧀ꦭꦩ꧀ꦧꦔꦤ꧀ ) was the last Javanese Hindu kingdom that flourished between the 15th and 18th centuries, based in the eastern corner of Java. The capital was at Banyuwangi. It had a long history of its own, developing contemporaneously with the largest Hindu kingdom in Java, Majapahit (1293–1527). At the time of the collapse of Majapahit in the late fifteenth century, Blambangan stood on its own as the one solitary Hindu state left in Java, controlling the larger part of Java’s Oosthoek.

The historical record and the study of the Blambangan Kingdom are scarce, which contributed to the obscurity of its history. Contemporary Javanese mostly know the kingdom through its link to the popular epic folklore, the legend of Damarwulan and Menak Jingga. The fictional story which is set in the Majapahit period, told that the rebellious King of Blambangan named Menak Jingga desired the hand of Majapahit Queen Kencanawungu.

== History ==
=== Background ===
During the Majapahit period c. 13th century, the eastern realm was regarded as a peripheral area of the Javanese kingdom, which centered in Trowulan, Majapahit, and surrounding Brantas River basin, whereas the eastern salient areas such as Lumajang were regarded as outlying provinces.

The Majapahit kingdom was established in 1293 by Raden Wijaya with the help of the cunning and able Arya Wiraraja, the Regent of Madura. As a reward of Wiraraja's support, in 1295, Raden Wijaya agreed to give the eastern salient of Java, which includes Blambangan areas with Lumajang as its capital.

The Nagarakretagama, composed in 1365, mentioned that the central part of the eastern corner of Java was visited by King Hayam Wuruk in his royal tour in 1359. The poem contains interesting information about the region.

=== Formation and growth ===
The eastern realm becomes a vassal or mancanagara (provinces) of Majapahit. Over time the Eastern realm steadily becomes more autonomous and where an Eastern court is situated, rivalling the Majapahit central authority. The rivalry erupted in the Regreg war (1404–1406), which was fought as a contest of succession between the Western court led by Wikramawardhana, against the Eastern court (which would become the Blambangan Kingdom) led by Bhre Wirabhumi. In 1406 the Western troops led by Bhre Tumapel, the son of Wikramawardhana, penetrated the eastern palace and defeated Bhre Wirabhumi.

After the collapse of Majapahit in the late 15th century, Blambangan stood alone as the sole Javanese Hindu polity in Java. The kingdom subsequently was contested and harassed by successive expansive Javanese Islamic states to the west, from Demak to Pajang and Mataram. On the eastern side across the strait, the Balinese courts of Gelgel and Mengwi also have invested their political interest in the region, as the Balinese regarded Blambangan as a buffer state to ward off Islamic expansive influences.

In the first decades of the 16th century, Tomé Pires' informants reported that the "heathen" Blambangan kingdom was the most powerful Javanese kingdom east of Surabaya. At that time, the port of Panarukan was the commercial as well as the political center of the kingdom.

For almost three centuries, Blambangan was situated between two different political factions, the Islamic state of Mataram in the west, and various Hindu realms in Bali (Gelgel, Buleleng, and Mengwi) in the east. Both neighbouring powers simultaneously contested the territory of Blambangan to appease their own political and religious ambitions.

=== Decline ===
Blambangan borders right at the eastern tip of the island of Java with the Mataram sultanate who is at war with Blambangan, also shows Blambangan's strong relationship with the kingdoms in Bali who always supply weapons against Mataram.

The Balinese kingdoms used Blambangan as a vassal and buffer against the Islamic expansion initiated by Mataram from the west and also found it useful to bolster the economy of Bali which was heavily overshadowed by endemic warfare.

In the second half of the 16th century, a few Roman Catholic missionaries from the Portuguese colony in Malacca arrived in East Java to try to convert the local people. They visited Panarukan and Blambangan and reported that the port of Panarukan was contested between the Muslim rulers of Pasuruan allied with Surabaya, against the Hindu King of Blambangan and Panarukan. The Balinese chronicle Babad Gumi, which was first composed around the early 18th century, ascribed the fall of Blambangan around this period in the year 1520 śaka or 1598 AD. This is one of the first dates within the babad that can be positively proved to be correct by comparison with European materials of the same period. When the Dutch visited Bali in February 1597 a large expedition was being collected by the king of Gelgel in Bali to help the lord of Blambangan from the Pasuruan attack. The expedition must have been a failure, as another Dutch report from early 1601 mentioned that the Pasuruan army had taken Blambangan some years ago and exterminated the royal family therein.

Other accounts asserted that the conquest of Blambangan by the forces of Sultan Agung of Mataram took place in 1639, which was also the end of Panarukan's independence. With the loss of its important port, Panarukan, the center of the Blambangan kingdom was reduced to inland south to present day Blambangan area, with its port in Banyuwangi. In 1665, Tawang Alun II Danureja, the 8th king of Blambangan, opened the forest of Sudiamara and established a new capital in Macan Putih, Kabat district (Kecamatan Kabat) located about 10 kilometres from Banyuwangi.

Of the nine rulers who once ruled Blambangan, Tawang Alun II (1665–1691) is considered one of the greatest kings of Blambangan. During his reign, Blambangan's territory reached Jember, Lumajang, Situbondo, and Bali. Blambangan society at that time lived peacefully and prosperous, after all time engaged in various warfare against the expansionist neighboring kingdoms to the west and east. The VOC archive mentioned the spectacular ngaben (cremation) ceremony of Tawang Alun II, that among his 400 wives, 271 of them performed suttee (self-immolation).

In 1697, the Balinese Kingdom of Buleleng sent its expedition to Blambangan, which established Balinese influence in the region.

In the early 18th century, the Dutch and British contested each other’s political and economic power in the region. Internal disputes about the succession at the court of Blambangan impaired the kingdom, making it vulnerable to foreign intervention.

== See also ==
- Hinduism in Java
- Javanese Kshatriya
- List of monarchs of Java
- Majapahit
- Osing people
- Blambangan Express
