= Tirta Gangga =

Former royal palace in eastern Bali, Indonesia

Coordinates: 8°24′43″S 115°35′15″E

- ᬢᬷᬃᬣᬕᬗ᭄ᬕ
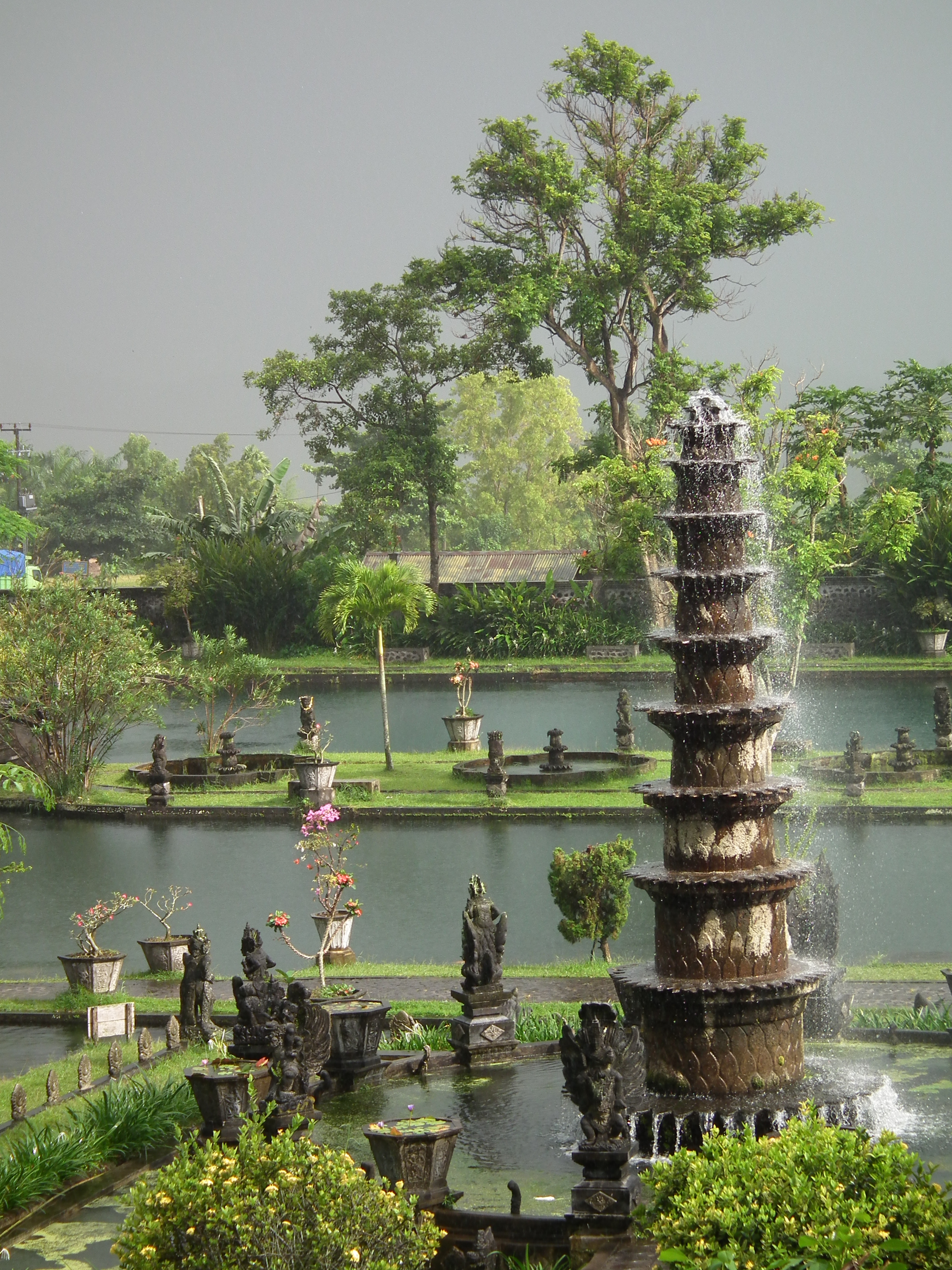
- One of the fountains in Tirta Gangga water palace
- Interactive map of the Tirta Gangga area

General information
- Location: Karangasem Regency, Bali, Indonesia
- Construction started: 1946
- Client: Karangasem Royal

Tirta Gangga (Balinese script: ᬢᬷᬃᬣᬕᬗ᭄ᬕ) is a former royal palace in eastern Bali, Indonesia. Named after the sacred river Ganges in India, it is noted for the Karangasem royal water palace, bathing pools and its Patirthan temple.

== Location ==
Tirta Gangga is near the village of Ababi in County Abang, about 7 kilometres north of Amlapura (Karangasem District) and south-east of Mount Agung.

== History ==
The complex was built in 1946 by the last king of Karangsem I Gusti Bagus Jelantik, who was also responsible for the construction of Ujung Water Palace. Tirta Gangga was intended as a recreation place for the king and his family. It was destroyed almost entirely by the eruption of nearby Mount Agung in 1963.

== Description ==
The temple complex covers one hectare. The springs that fill up the various ponds are to the northwest, on higher ground. Its waters are used for irrigation, economic activity and recreation.

Tirta Gangga is also called “Taman Rijasa” (Rijasa garden) because some rijasa trees (anyang-anyang - Elaeocarpus Grandiflorus) were planted.

== Religion ==
Tirta Gangga upholds the beliefs in Balinese Hinduism that the river Ganges and its waters are sacred. Its water is used as holy water (tirta) for religious activities The Patirthan temple illustrates the historic significance of Tirta Gangga in the Balinese tradition as a pilgrimage and holy water site.

== Gallery ==
Tirta Gangga

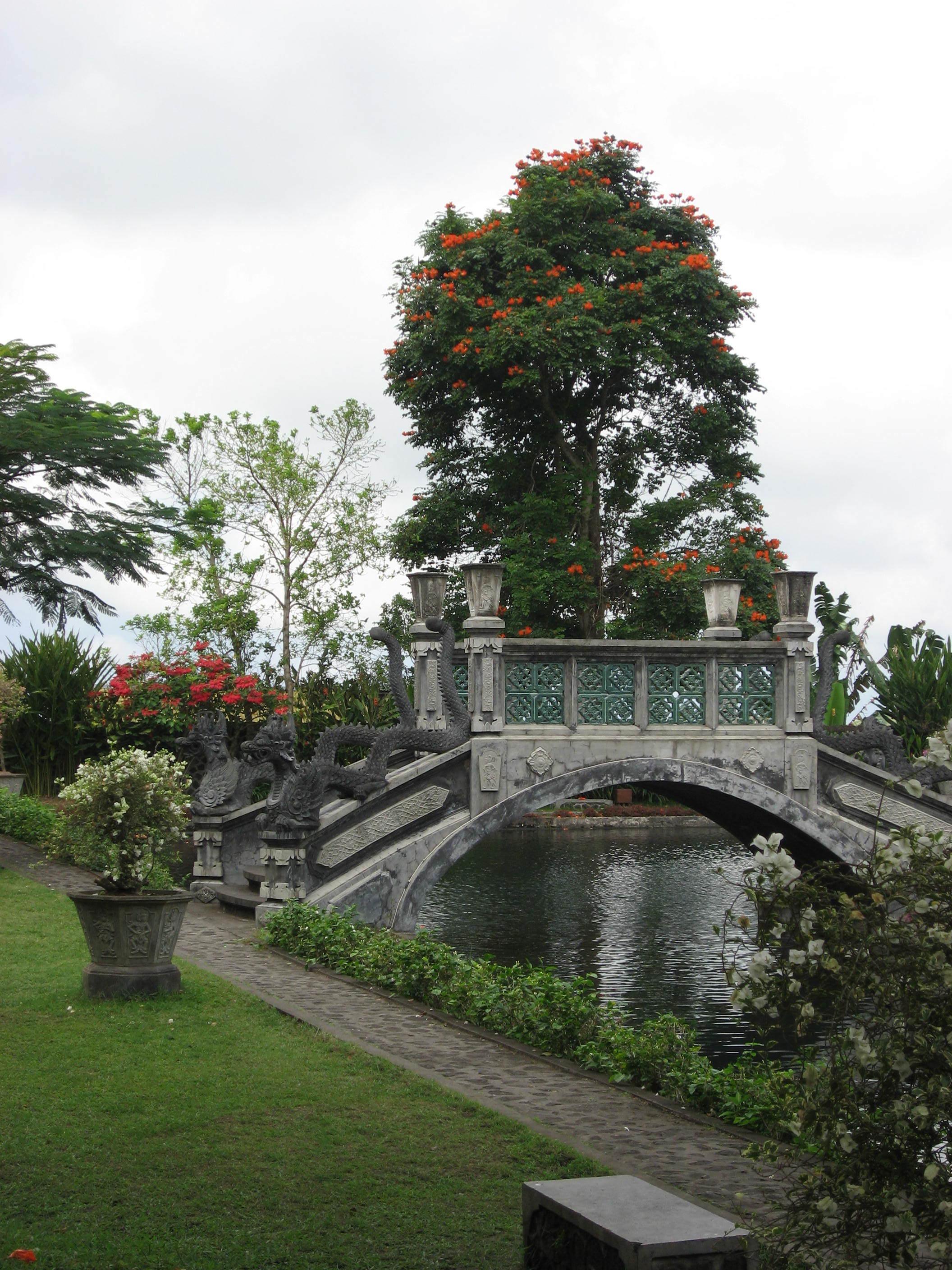

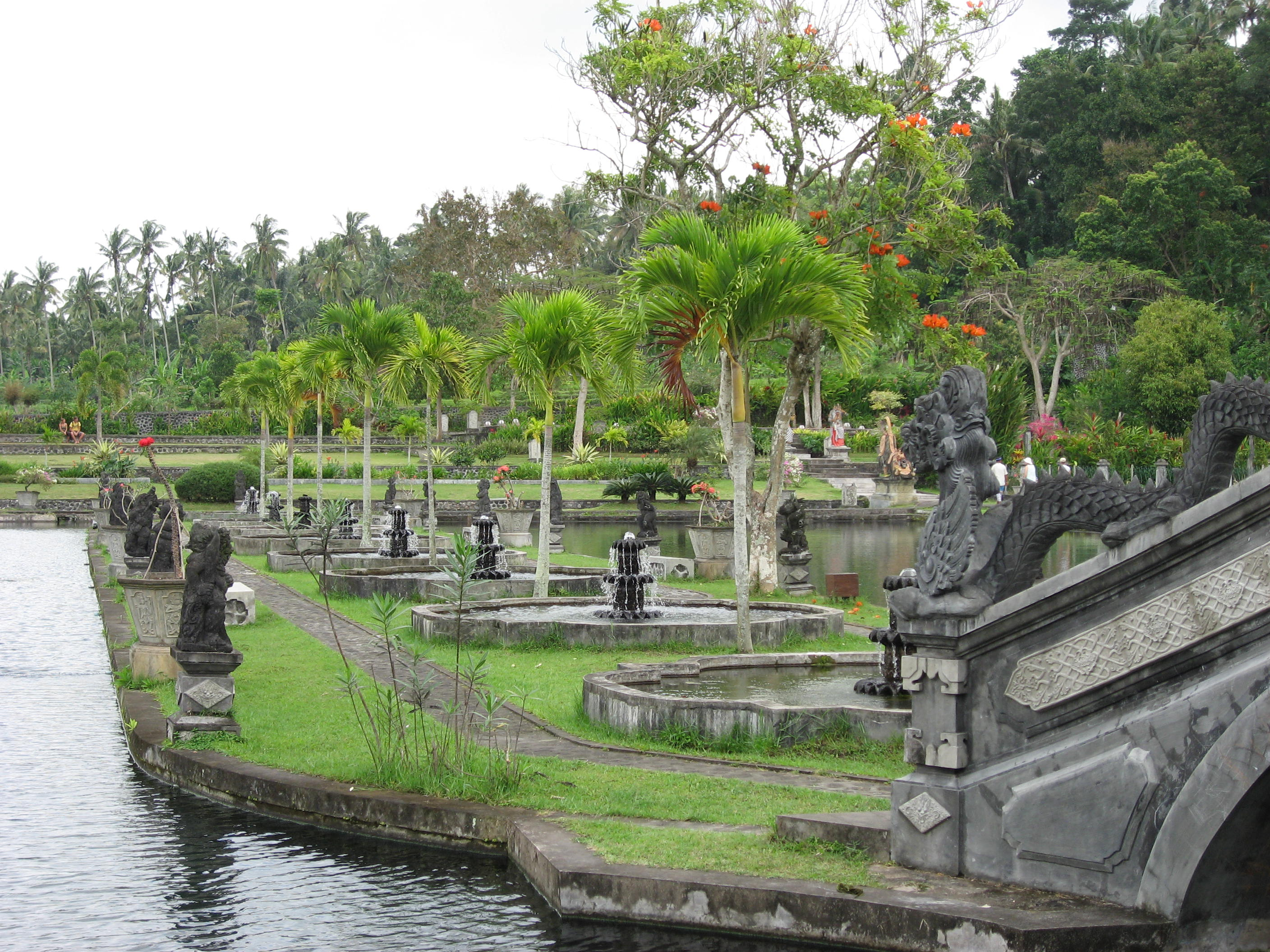

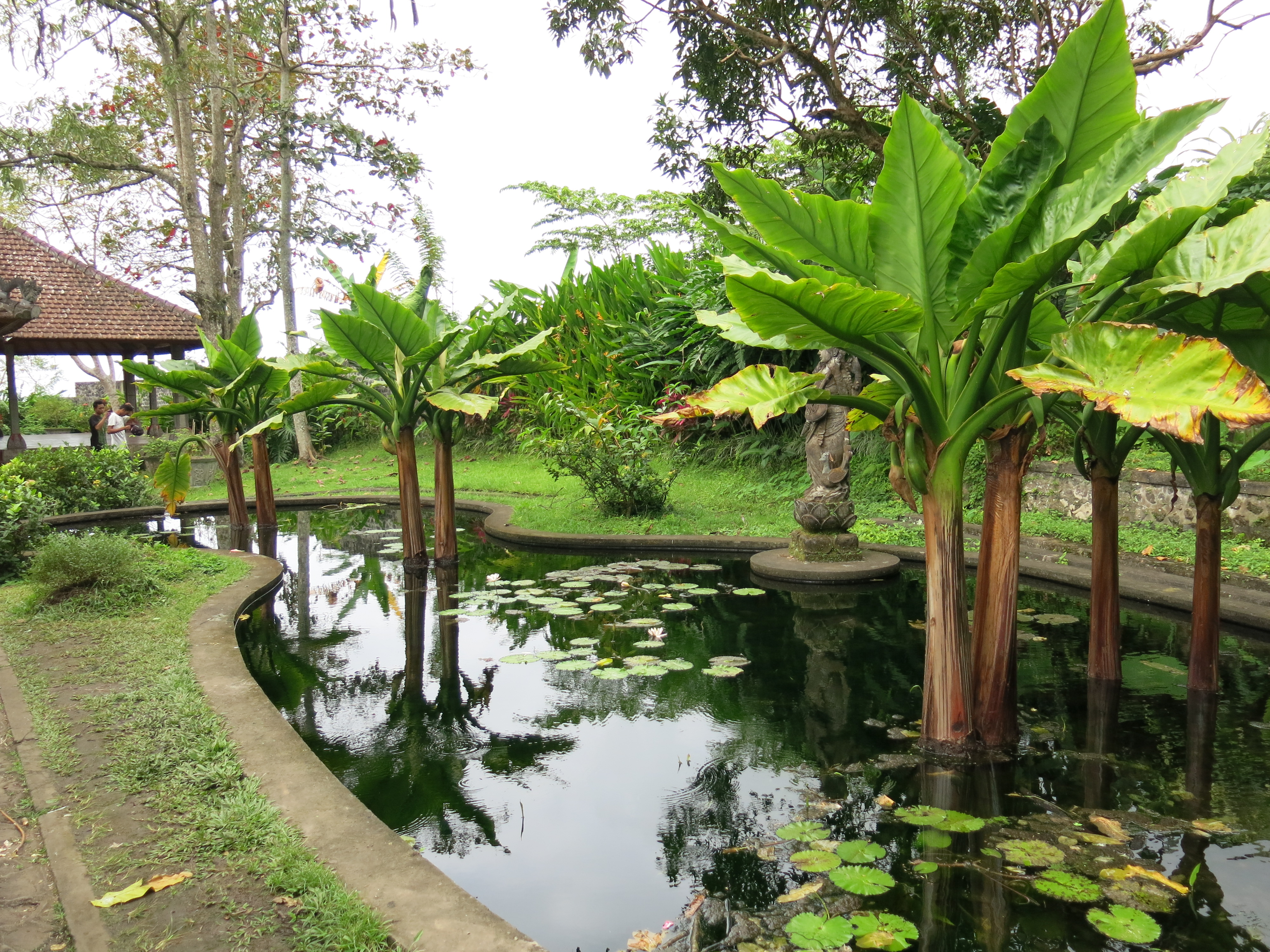

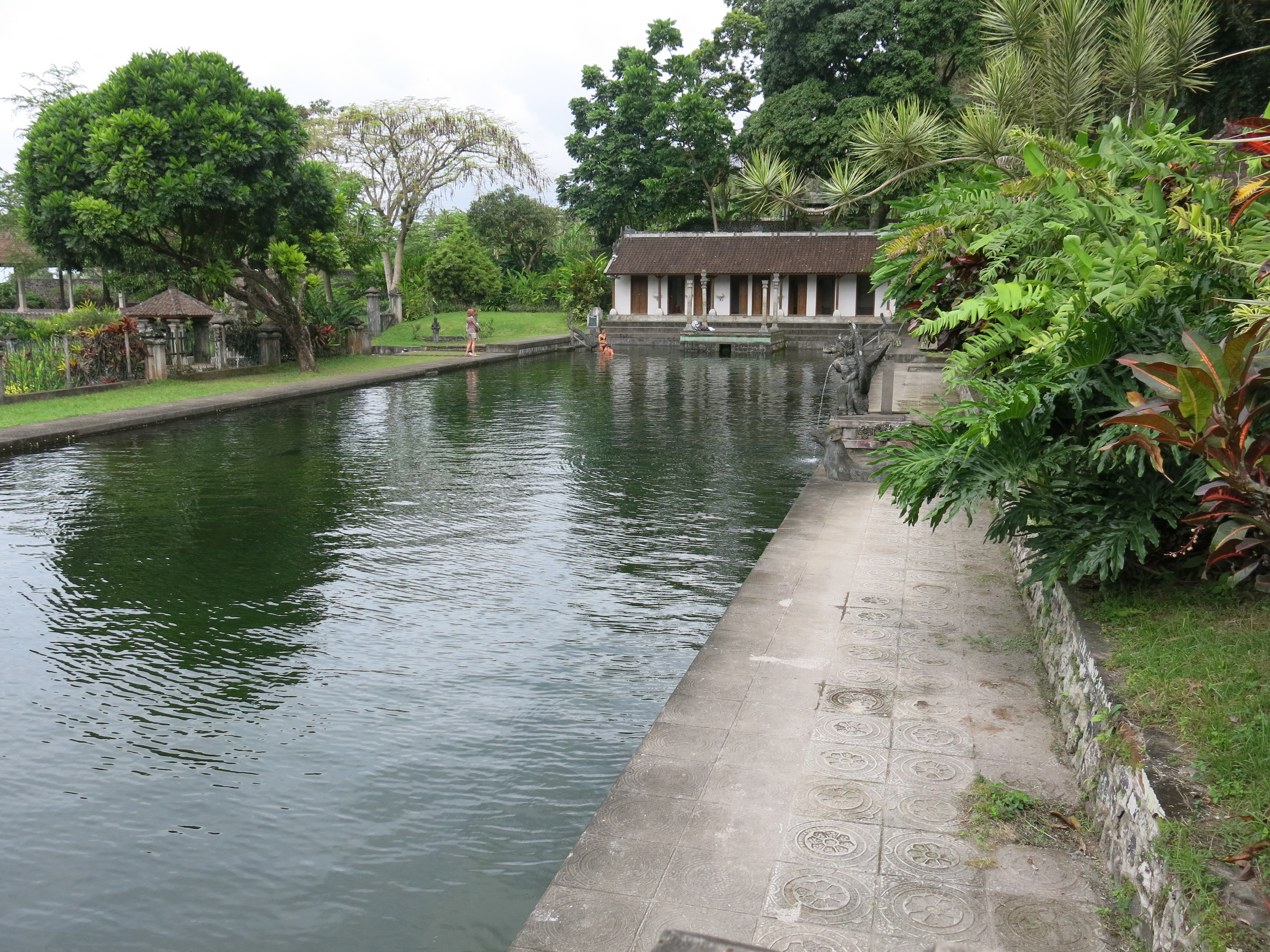

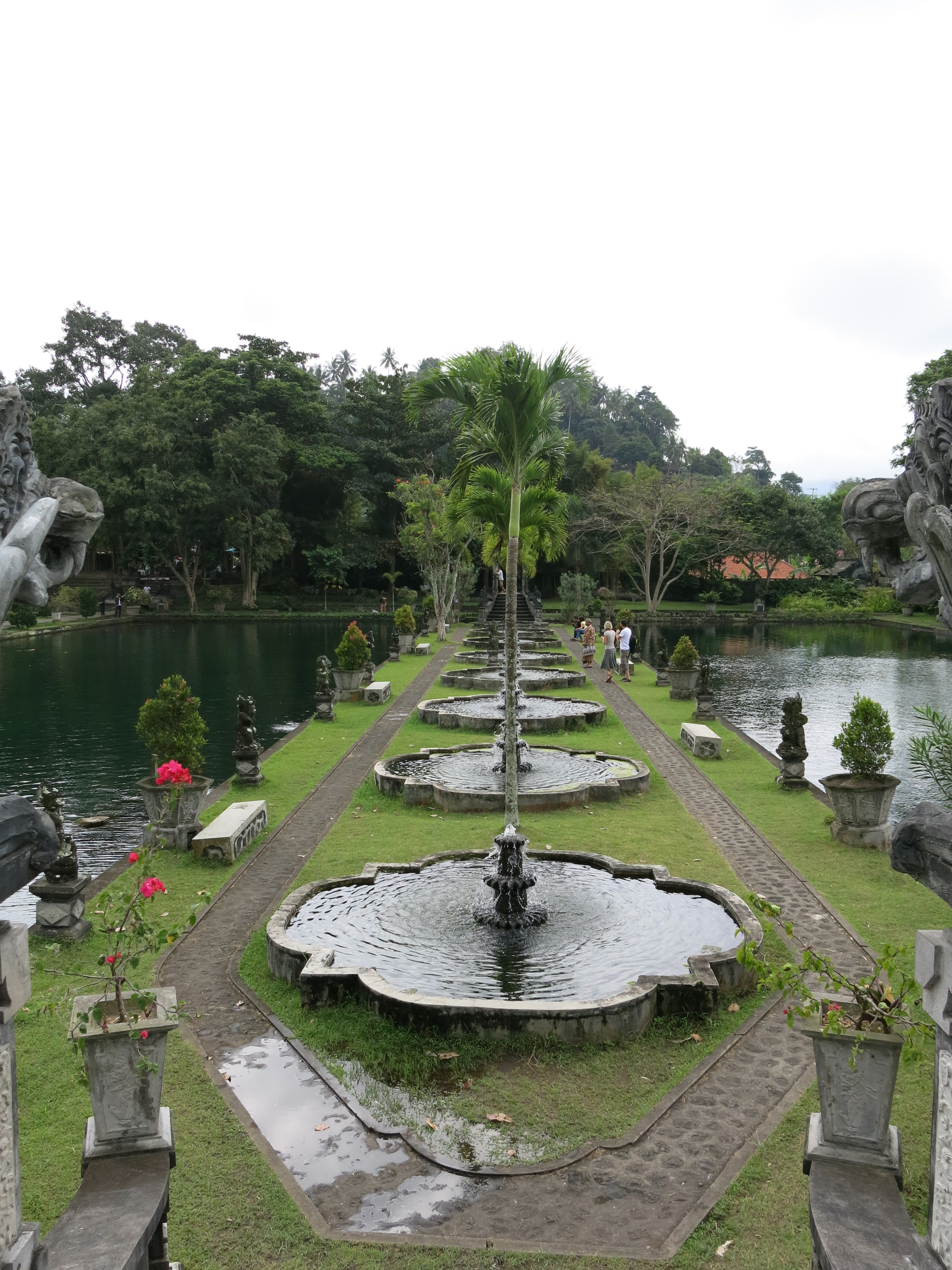
