= I Gusti Bagus Jelantik =

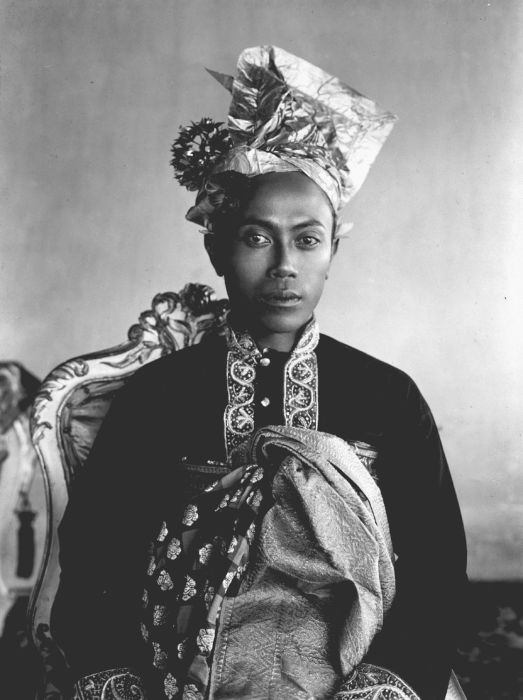
Portrait of Gusti Bagus Djilantik

Gusti Bagus Djilantik (Balinese: ᬕᬸᬲ᭄ᬢᬶᬩᬕᬸᬲ᭄ᬤ᭄ᬚᬶᬮᬦ᭄ᬢᬶᬓ᭄, 1887–1966) was a raja of Karangasem Kingdom of Bali. He served under Dutch East Indies colonial rule. He built the Taman Ujung temple garden. He had the title Anak Agung Agung Anglurah K’tut Karangasem. The park was 400 hectares but was reduced by land reform programs to 10 hectares. The Kingdom's main palace of Puri Amlapura is in Amlapura and dates to the 16th century Balinese prime minister Batan Jeruk.

== Gallery ==
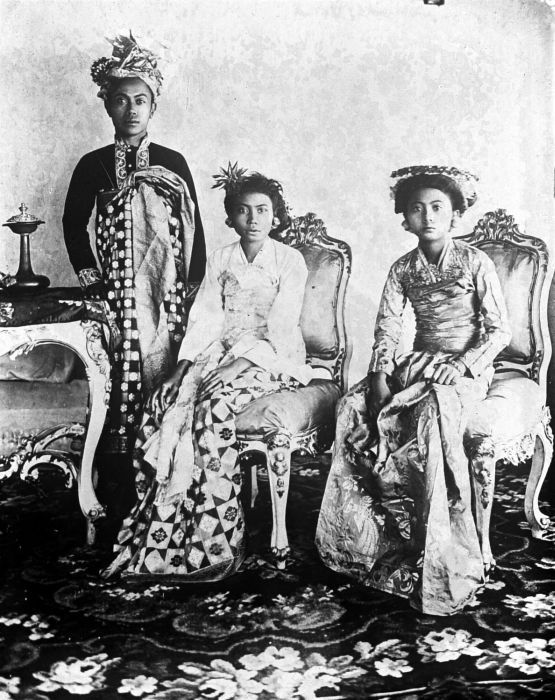
Portrait of Gusti Bagus Djilantik and his two wives. The furniture was a gift from Queen Wilhelmina

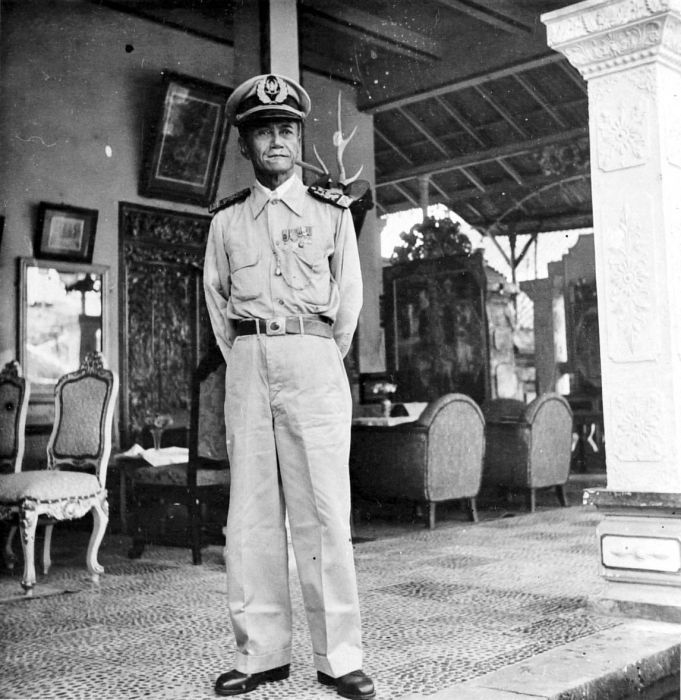
In uniform for the building of "Maskerdam" at the palace complex (1949)

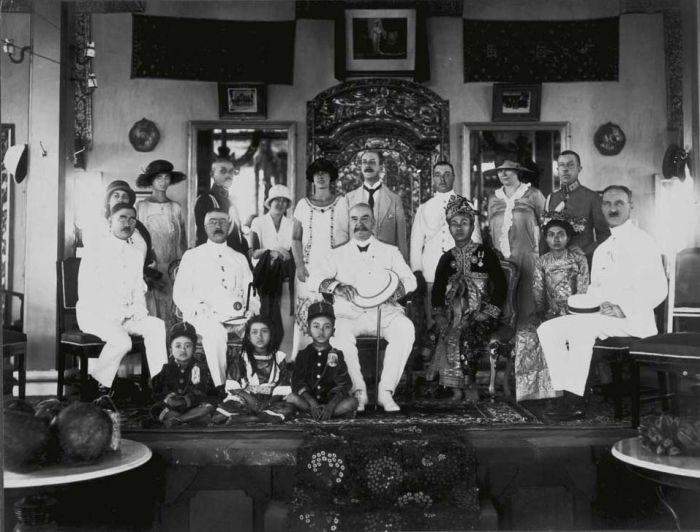
During the visit of Governor General Mr. D. Fock

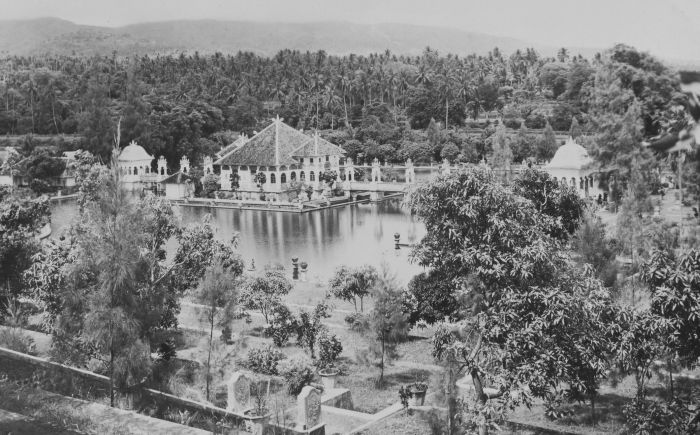
Ujung Water Palace in 1935

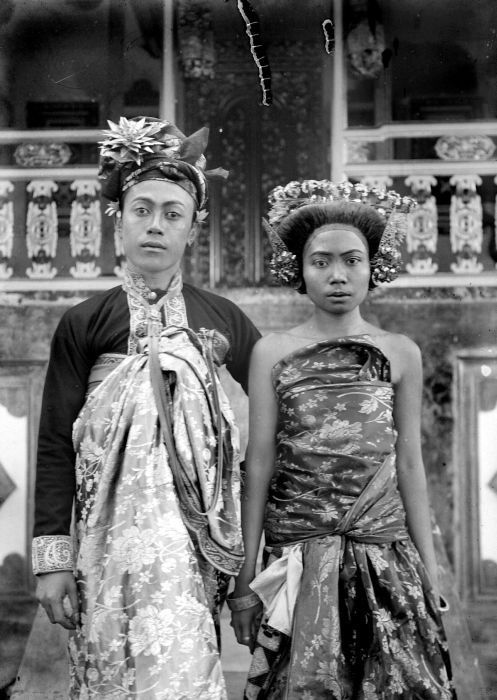
Gusti Bagus Djilantik and one of his wives

== See also ==
- Dutch intervention in Lombok and Karangasem
- Bulantrisna Djelantik, one of his granddaughters
