= Bulantrisna Djelantik =

Indonesian academic and dancer (1947–2021)

Ayu Bulantrisna Djelantik
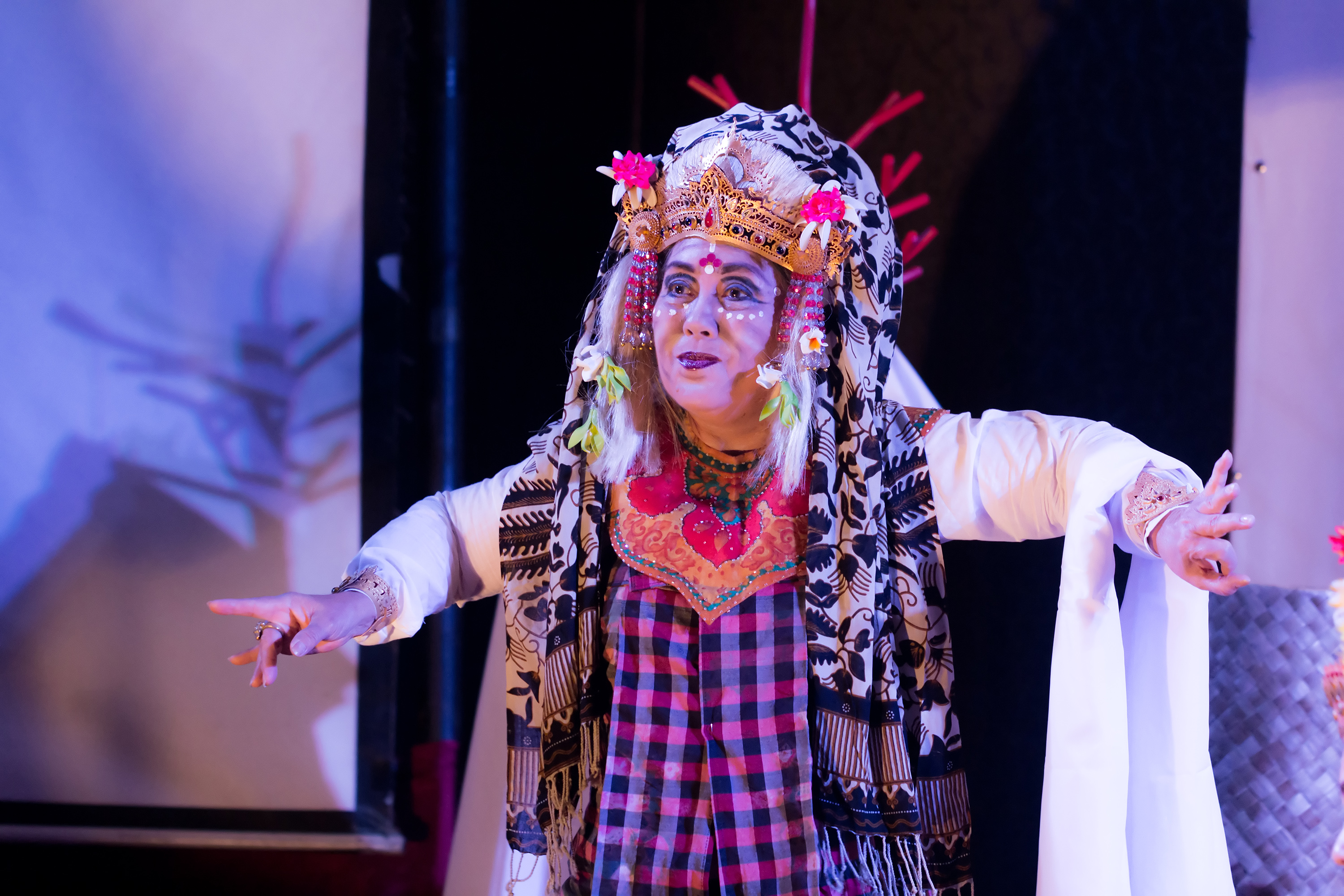
- Bulantrisna Djelantik portraying Calon Arang in a Balinese dance drama based on Toeti Heraty's version of the story
- Born: Ayu Bulantrisna Djelantik; 8 September 1947; Deventer, Netherlands
- Died: 24 February 2021 (aged 73); Jakarta, Indonesia

Ayu Bulantrisna Djelantik (8 September 1947 – 24 February 2021) was a Dutch-born Indonesian traditional Balinese dancer, ENT specialist, and a lecturer at the faculty of medicine at Padjadjaran University.

== Early life and education ==
Bulantrisna was born as the first child of five siblings, from the Balinese-Dutch couple Dr. A.A. Made Djelantik and Astri Henriette Zwart. Her father was the son of I Gusti Bagus Jelantik, the raja of the Karangasem Regency. Her mother was the daughter of the famous Dutch designer Piet Zwart, a proponent of the De Stijl movement. Bulantrisna's father was studying in the Netherlands during the Indonesian independence upheaval, where he met his future wife. As a WHO malariologist and head of the Bali Health Department, Dr. Djelantik worked in many places across Indonesia and abroad.

Bulantrisna spent her childhood in Bali, where her father summoned traditional dance experts who taught her and her siblings classical Balinese dances. She then continued her medical studies in Bandung, Indonesia, and she had a career as a doctor and lived abroad for some years including in the United States.

== Career ==
She came back to Indonesia after four years abroad and lived in Bandung. She taught at the Faculty of Medicine, Padjadjaran University, and worked as an otolaryngologist. Bulantrisna was also the chair of the Southeast Asia Society for Sound Hearing.

Bulantrisna founded a dance studio called Bengkel Tari Ayu Bulan (Ayu Bulan's Dance Workshop), which is still active in conducting workshops and performing in Indonesia as well as in many other countries. She performed mainly classical legong dances with her dance troupe, based in Jakarta. She also collaborated in choreography with others, such as with Retno Maruti, the master of classical Javanese dances.

Aside from dances, Bulantrisna also supported Indonesian film and film making with Balitaksu Foundation, and publishing art and children literature with Saritaksu Publications.

== Personal life ==
Bulantrisna died on 24 February 2021, of pancreatic cancer.

== See also ==
- Legong
