= Ujung Water Palace =

Building in Karangasem, Bali, Indonesia

Coordinates: 8°27′47″S 115°37′50″E

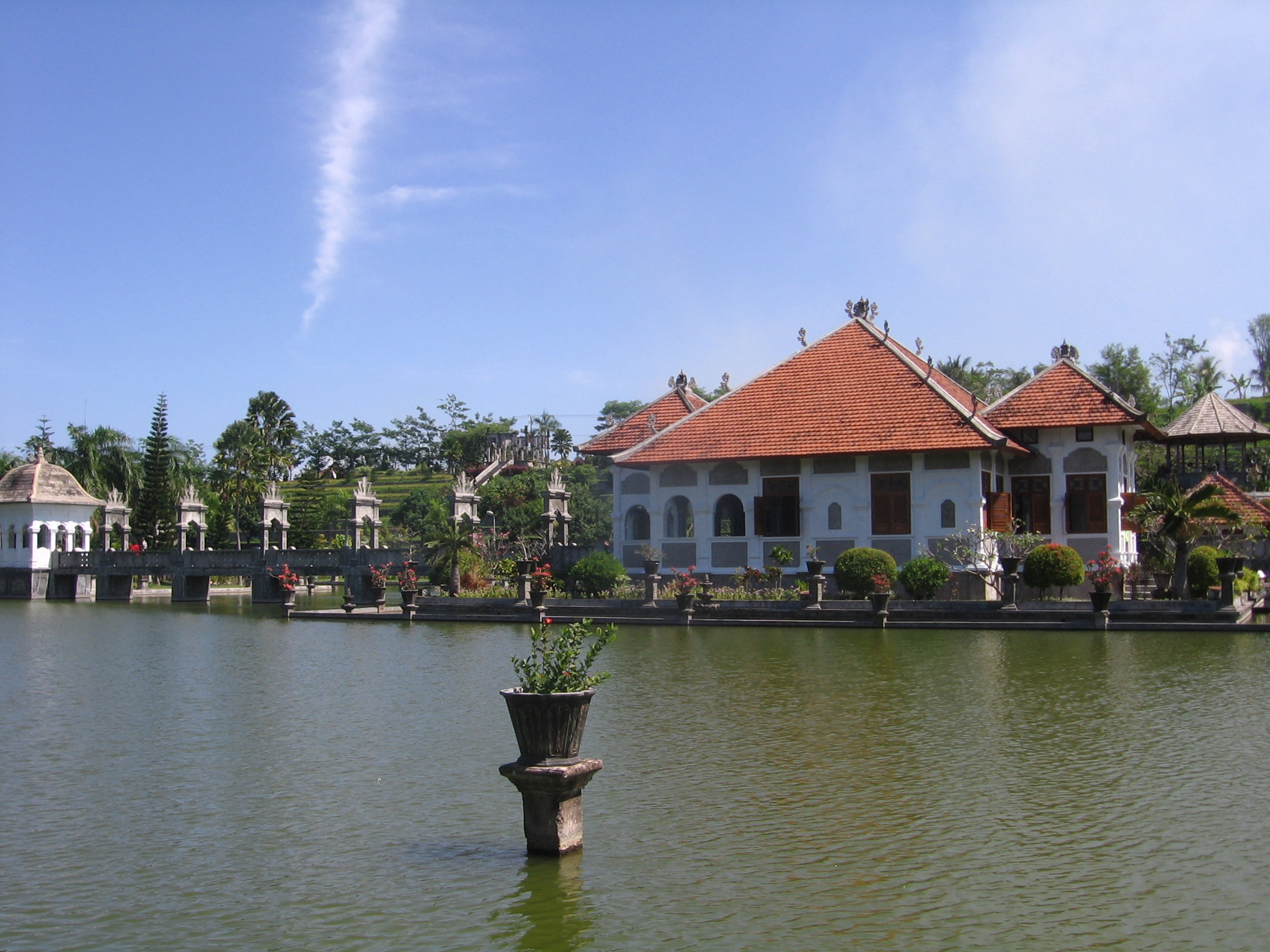
- The Main building of Ujung Water Palace
- Interactive map of the Ujung Water Palace area

General information
- Location: Karangasem Regency, Bali, Indonesia
- Construction started: 1909
- Client: Karangasem Royal

Design and construction
- Architects: van Den Hentz; Loto Ang undagi (Balinese architects)

Ujung Water Palace is a former palace of the Kingdom of Karangasem in Karangasem Regency, Bali. Now, this palace is also known as Ujung Park or Sukasada Park. In the Dutch East Indies era, this place was known by the name Waterpaleis.

== Location ==
It is located approximately 5 kilometres south-east of Amlapura on the south-east coast of Bali.

Between it and the sea stands the Pura Lingga Yoni or Lingga Yoni temple, with its main piece a 2 m-long (6.6 ft) phallic-shaped stone found 10 m (33 ft) out to sea during the construction of a breakwall in 2012. The stone was brought to shore and a new temple consecrated around it.

== Description ==
Its name means "Garden at the End" or "Garden at the Edge".

Built on 12 hectares (30 acres), the palace has three large pools. In the center pool there is the main building named Gili Bale ("island pavilion"), connected to the edge of the pool by a bridge; untypically of balinese bale, this building has walls and a distinct Dutch colonial white façade. Another distinctive trait is the use of concrete, then considered a new technology and another sign of Western influence.

One original building is the Bale Kapal, with a flight of stairs on the west side of the palace; it dominates the ponds and looks out across the entire gardens onto coconut groves, Ujung Beach and Mount Lempuyang beyond.

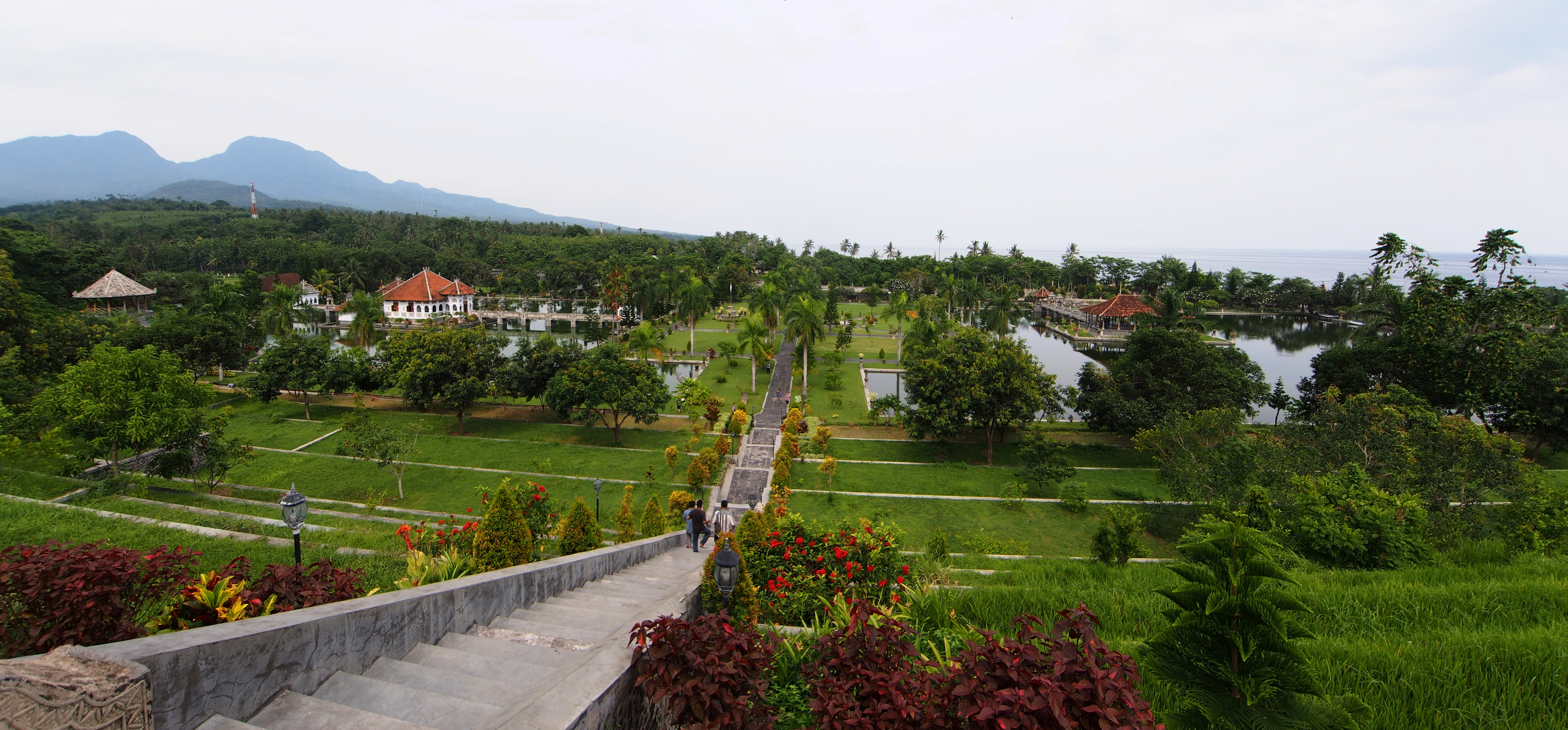
General view from the Bale Kapal

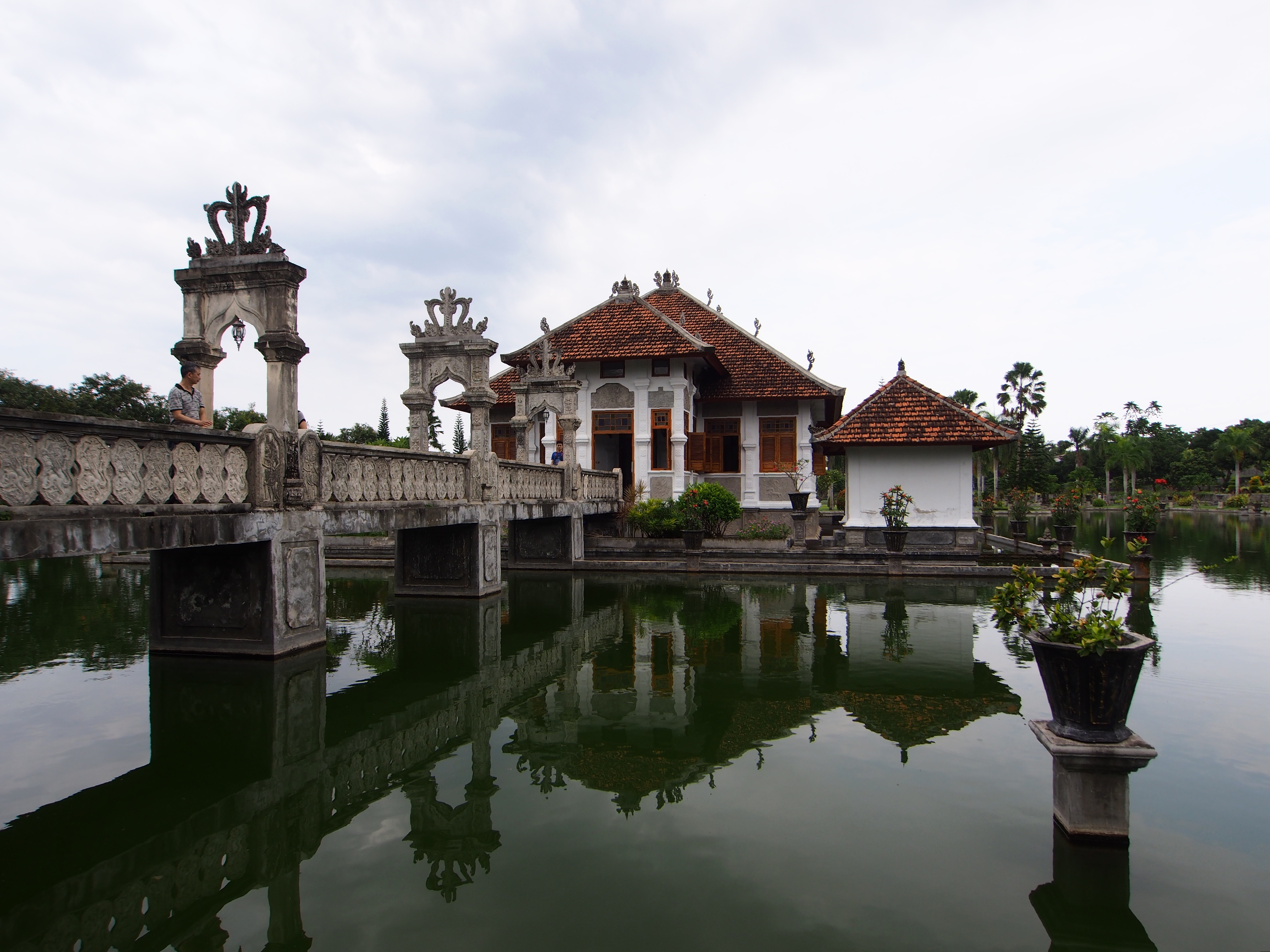
Bridge to the Gili Bale

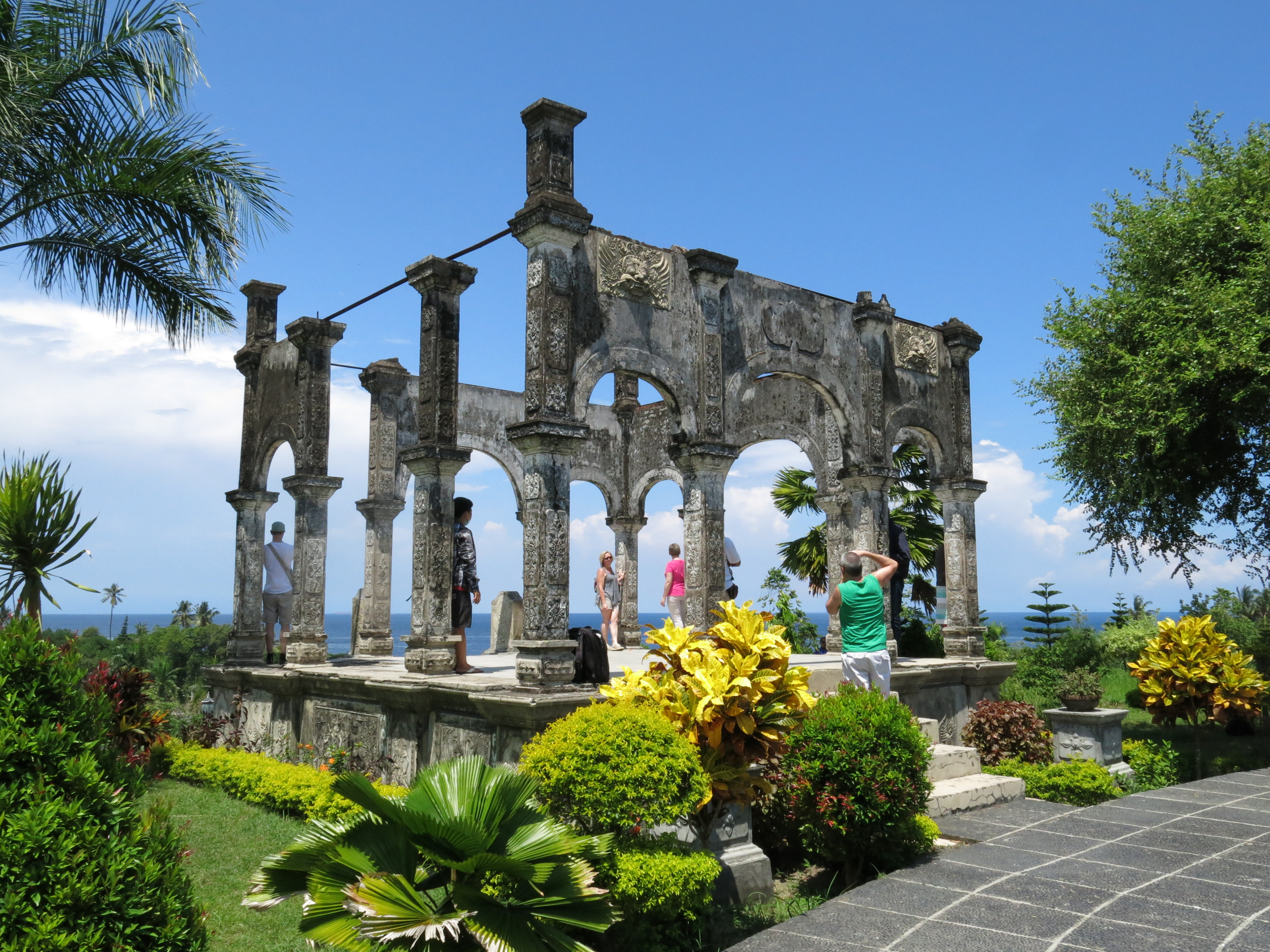
A remaining ruin

== History ==
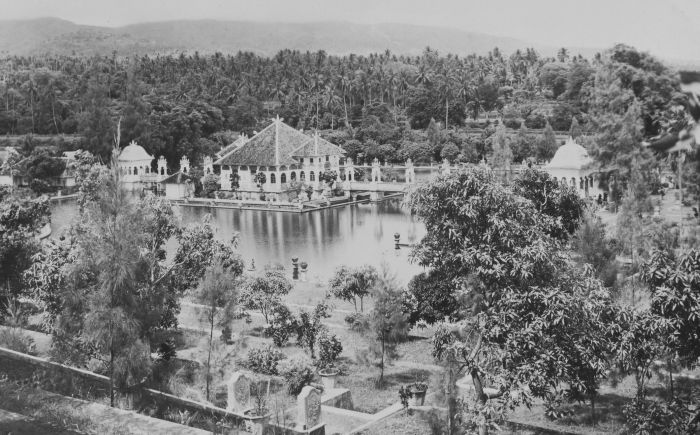
Ujung Water Palace in 1935

Ujung Water Palace was built by the last king of Karangasem I Gusti Bagus Jelantik in 1909, as a development of the Dirah Pool which has been built by the previous king in 1901 for exorcisms. The architects were the Dutch van Den Hentz, the Chinese Loto Ang, and undagi (Balinese architects). The construction was completed in 1921. In 1937, Taman Ujung Karangasem was inaugurated with a marble stele inscribed with the text in two alphabets: Latin and Balinese script; and in two languages: Malay and Balinese.

Later, among its guests were the King of Siam (Thailand), the Governor-General of the Netherlands East Indies, and the Sultans of both Surakarta (Solo) and Yogyakarta.

It was almost entirely destroyed by the eruption of Mount Agung in 1963 and the earthquake in 1975.
After years of neglect, the place underwent renovations between 1998 and 2001 and is now a popular tourist attraction.
