= Mayura Park =

- Taman Mayura
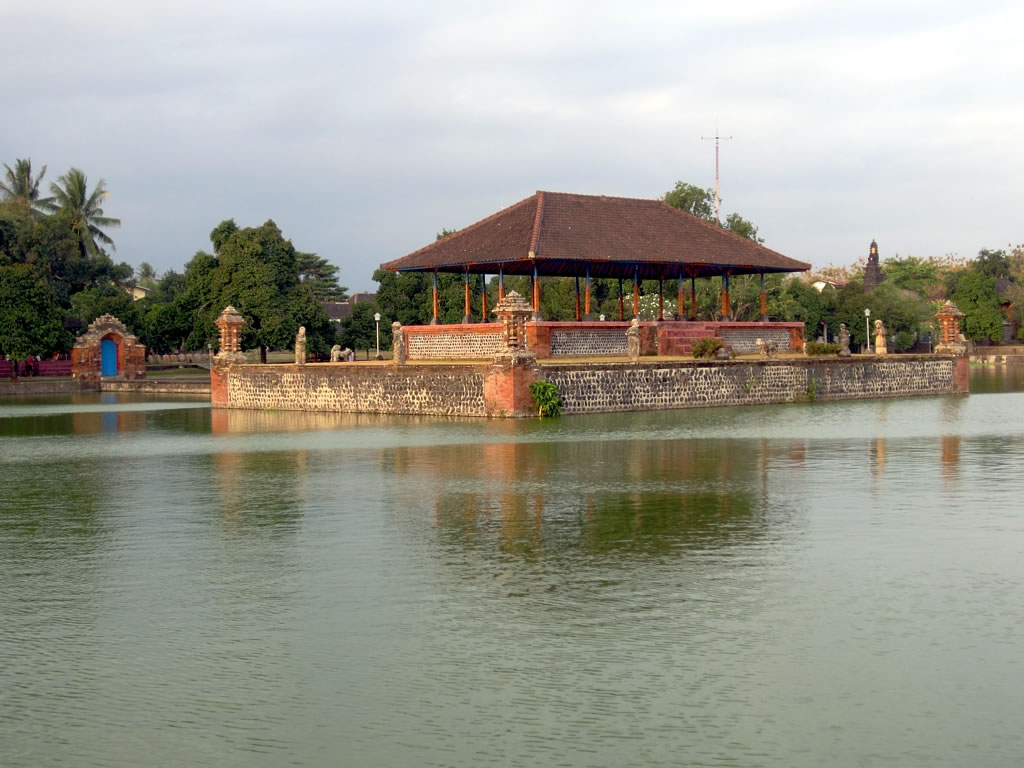
- Bale Kambang, 5 October 2011
- Interactive map of the Mayura Park area

General information
- Type: Park
- Architectural style: Balinese
- Location: Mataram, West Nusa Tenggara, Jl. Purbasari, Mayura, Mataram subdistrict, Mataram., Indonesia
- Coordinates: 8°35′12.52″S 116°7′59.02″E
- Estimated completion: 19th century

Technical details
- Grounds: 33,877.10 m²

Mayura Park was built by Anak Agung Gde Ngurah Karangasem in 1866, located 2 km east Mataram.

Mayura Park is a garden built by the king as a complement to the palace of the king. The Mayura Park also has a royal residence in the sense of being occupied by the king while resting in the garden, located in what is now the Padmasana.

== History ==
At the beginning of the 19th century, Lombok was divided into several small kingdoms, until 1838 there was a war and the unification of the kingdom which left 2 major kingdoms, namely Sasak Singasari and Sasak Mataram. In 1839 a war broke out between the two kingdoms, which resulted in the defeat of Singasari, but the Mataram king was killed in action, he left 2 sons, crown prince Gde Ngurah Karangasem and Anak Agung Ketut Ngurah Karangasem.

In the mid-19th century, the crown prince wanted the construction of a new palace complex in the former Singasari palace, the palace was completed in 1866, the entire palace complex was given the name of the Singasari Palace and later it was changed to Cakranegara Palace, the palace building in the west was given the name Puri Ukir Kawi and to the east of the palace there is a garden which was originally given the name Taman Kelepug, because the sound of springs came from the pond kelepug-kelepug, the name changed to Mayura Garden, when the place became a place to pets mayura (Sanskrit: peacocks).

After the defeat against the Dutch, the destroyed Cakranegara palace only left the Mayura Park and the Lombok royal treasure. During the war between Sasak Mataram and the Dutch, the bale kambang was used to store weapons and gunpowder, after it was taken over Dutch government, the bale kambang became a courtroom and the building in the north became the office of the Assistant Resident and the Cakranegara District office.

== Building and collections ==
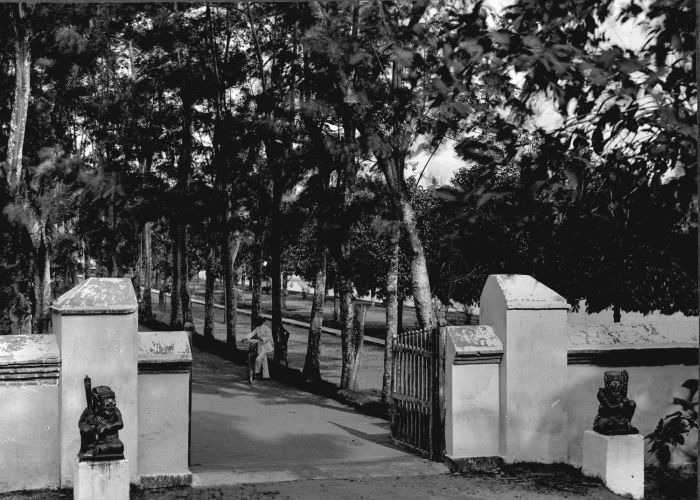
The entrance to the Mayura Park, circa 1925

=== Building ===
The structure of the Mayura Park is rectangular, with a length of 244.60 meters, a width of 138.50 meters (33,877.10 square meters), to the north there is a building (building) that was once used as a resident assistant office, in the middle of Mayura Park there is a pond and in middle of the pond is equipped with a building called Bale Kambang, around the pond of Taman Mayura there are four open buildings of various sizes.

=== Collections ===
There are 3 pairs of statues of a Muslim leader wearing traditional Banjar clothing, placed in the east, south and west of the Bale Kambang courtyard, there is also 1 bronze cannon near the entrance of the bale kambang and 1 iron cannon near the entrance of the park.
