= Kingdom of Karangasem =

Kingdom of Karangasem Karang Semadi ᬓ᭄ᬭᬚᬵᬦ᭄ᬓᬭᬗᬲᭂᬫ᭄
- Kingdom under Klungkung precedence
- 1661–1894
- Flag

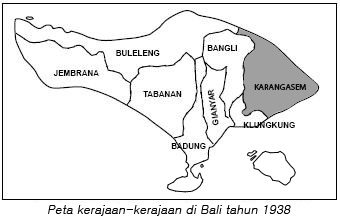
- Karangasem in 1938, corresponding roughly to present-day Karangasem Regency in Bali Province
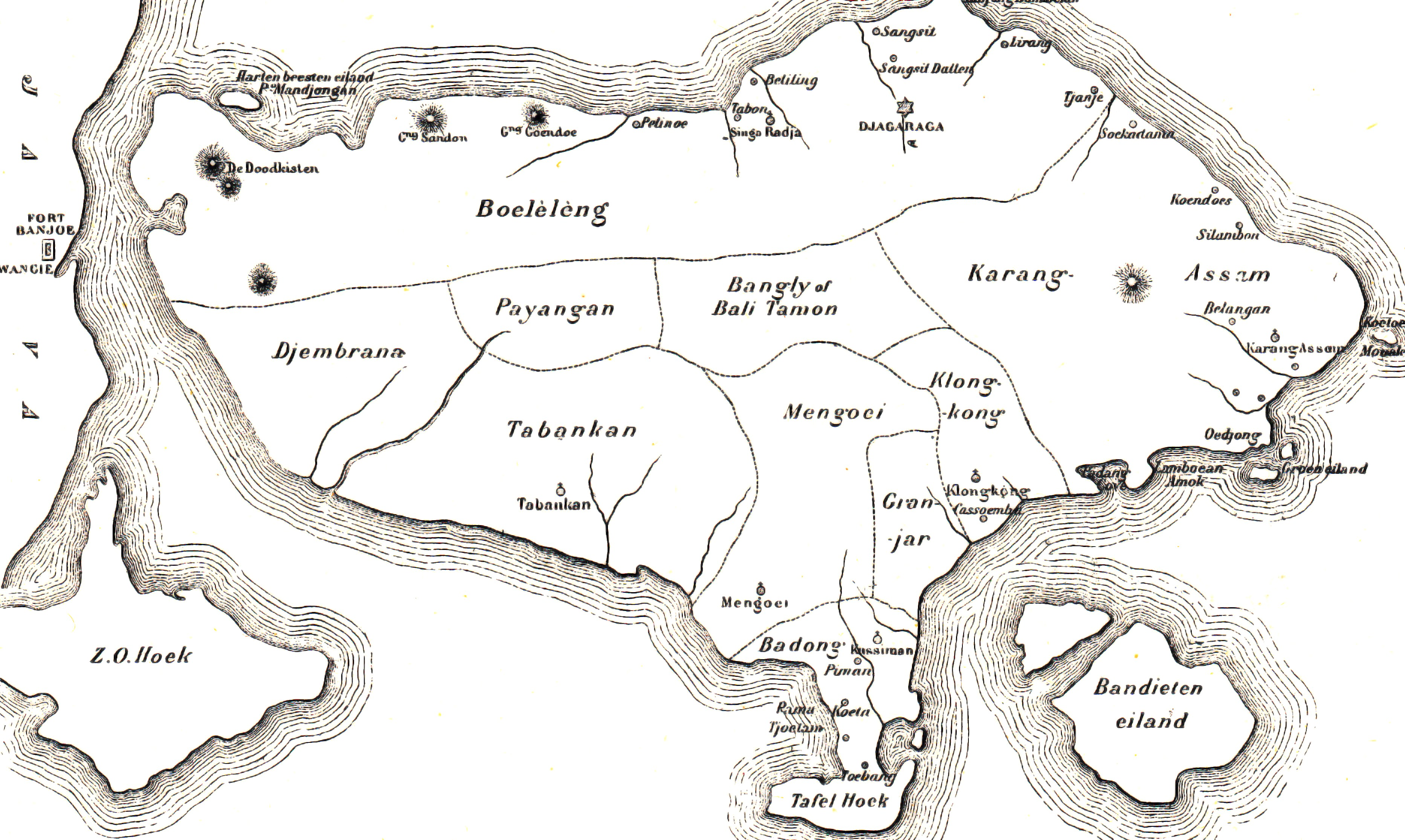
- The territory of the Karangasem kingdom in 1900
- Capital: Amlapura
- Government
  - Type: Monarchy
- Anak Agung Agung
  - 1600–?: Gusti Nyoman Karang (first)
  - 1908–1966: I Gusti Bagus Jelantik (last)
- History
  - Established: 1661
  - Conquered by the Dutch East Indies: 1894
Preceded by	Succeeded by
Gelgel Kingdom	Dutch East Indies
- Today part of: Indonesia

The Kingdom of Karangasem (Balinese: ᬓ᭄ᬭᬚᬵᬦ᭄ᬓᬭᬗᬲᭂᬫ᭄, translit. Krajaan Karaṅasĕm), also known as Karang Semadi (earlier name), was a Hindu maritime kingdom that was founded in the mid-17th century in the eastern part of Bali Island. During its heyday, the kingdom of Karangasem had territory as far as Lombok Island between 1692 and 1894. After being conquered by the Dutch in 1894, the kingdom was under the control of the Dutch East Indies government. After the independence of the Republic of Indonesia, the Kingdom of Karangasem had the status of Karangasem Level II Region in the Bali Provincial government.

== Etymology ==
The name Karangasem derives from the phrase “Karang Semadi.” Some records detailing the origin of the name Karangasem are found in the Sading C. Inscription, located at Geria Mandara in Munggu, Badung. It is further noted that Mount Lempuyang, northeast of Amlapura, was originally named Adri Karang, which means “Coral Mountain.”

The inscription recounts that in the year 1072 Saka, on the 12th day of the separo terang, Wuku Julungwangi di bulan Cetra, Bathara Guru commanded one of his sons, Sri Maharaja Jayasakti, also known as Hyang Agnijaya, to descend to Bali. The task entrusted to him, as quoted in the inscription, reads “...gumawyeana Dharma rikang Adri Karang maka kerahayuan ing Jagat Bangsul...”, which means “to come to Adri Karang to build a Pura (Dharma) to provide physical and spiritual safety for the Island of the Gods.” It is said that Hyang Agnijaya arrived at Adri Karang (Mount Lempuyang, located northeast of the city of Amlapura) alongside his brothers; Sambhu, Brahma, Indra, and Vishnu. Mount Lempuyang was chosen by Bathara Guru as the place from which to spread His love for the salvation of humanity.

In historical research on the origins of the temple, Lempuyang is linked to the word lampu, meaning “chosen,” and Hyang, meaning “God” (Bathara Guru, Hyang Parameswara). It was here at Adri Karang that Hyang Agnijaya established Pura Lempuyang Luhur as a place for meditation (Karang Semadi). Over time, the name Karang Semadi evolved into Karangasem.

== History ==
=== Establishment of the Karangasem Kingdom ===
From the 16th to the 17th century, Karangasem was under the rule of the Gelgel Kingdom, with King I Dewa Karangamla based in Selagumi (Balepunduk). I Dewa Karangamla married the widow of I Gusti Arya Batanjeruk, a royal regent who had led a rebellion and was killed in the village of Bungaya, on the condition that after their marriage, Batanjeruk’s son would eventually become the ruler. This condition was agreed upon, and subsequently, I Dewa Karangamla’s family moved from Selagumi to Batuaya. I Dewa Karangamla also had a son by another wife named I Dewa Gde Batuaya. The transfer of power to the son of Batanjeruk’s widow marked the founding of the Karangasem Kingdom, which was ruled by the Batanjeruk Dynasty.

=== Conquest of Buleleng and Lombok and Conquest of Karangasem by the Dutch ===
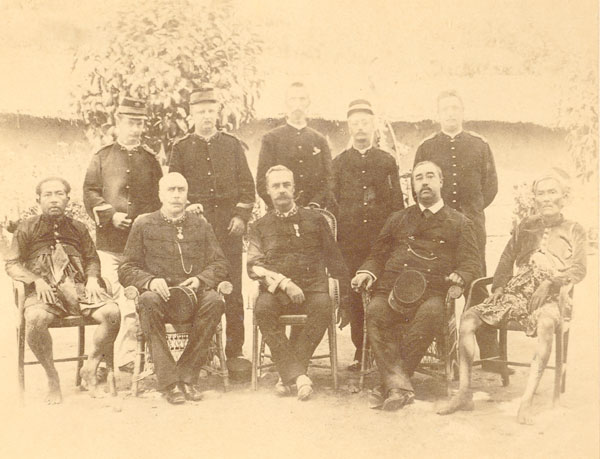
The leaders involved in the war in Lombok in 1894: Anak Agung Ketut Karangasem, Major General P.P.H. van Ham, Major Genderal J.A. Vetter (Comandant), Resident M.C. Dannenbargh, and Gusti Gede Jelantik.

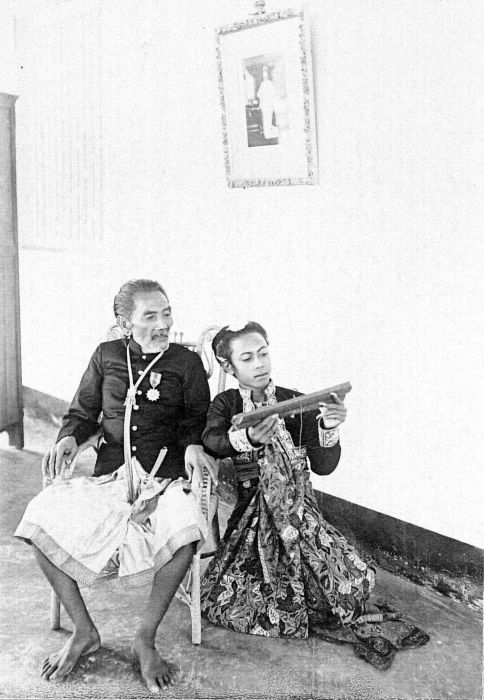
Gusti Gede Jelantik and his son, Gusti Bagus Jelantik, at the Puri Agung Karangasem (circa 1900s).

After the death of King I Gusti Anglurah Ketut Karangasem, the Karangasem Kingdom was ruled by I Gusti Gede Karangasem (Dewata di Tohpati) from 1801 to 1806. During that time, the territory of the Karangasem Kingdom expanded, extending its authority as far as Buleleng and Jembrana. After his death, I Gusti Gede Ngurah Karangasem was succeeded by his son, I Gusti Lanang Peguyangan, who was also known as I Gusti Gede Lanang Karangasem.

The victory of the Kingdom of Buleleng over the Kingdom of Karangasem forced the king of Karangasem, I Gusti Lanang Peguyangan, to step down, and at that time the Kingdom of Karangasem came under the rule of the king of Buleleng, I Dewa Pahang. I Gusti Lanang Peguyangan eventually regained power. A rebellion led by a royal official named I Gusti Bagus Karang in 1827 succeeded in overthrowing I Gusti Lanang Peguyangan, forcing him to flee to Lombok, and the throne of the Karangasem Kingdom was taken by I Gusti Bagus Karang. When I Gusti Bagus Karang fell in battle during the attack on Lombok, at the same time the king of Buleleng, I Gusti Ngurah Made Karangasem, succeeded in conquering Karangasem and appointed his son-in-law, I Gusti Gede Cotong, as king of Karangasem. After I Gusti Gede Cotong was killed in a power struggle, the throne of Karangasem was inherited by the king of Buleleng’s cousin, I Gusti Ngurah Gede Karangasem.

Groups of Balinese nobles from the Kingdom of Karangasem subsequently began to gain control over the western part of Lombok Island. One of these groups, the Bali-Mataram faction, succeeded in gaining more territory than the other Balinese groups and eventually came to control the entire island in 1839. Previously Lombok had been subjugated by Karangasem in 1740 after the Selaparang-Sasak Kingdom was conquered, but thanks to an agreement with Raden Praya, the island was divided into two parts, though both continued to recognize Karangasem as their parent kingdom. From that time onward, Balinese court culture and civilization also flourished in Lombok.

On August 25, 1891, the son of the ruler of Bali-Mataram, Anak Agung Ketut Karangasem, was dispatched, along with 8,000 soldiers, to suppress the rebellion in Praya, On September 8, 1891, a second force of 3,000 men, led by another son, Anak Agung Made Karangasem, was dispatched as reinforcements. Since the royal army appeared to be struggling to handle the situation, the ruler of Karangasem, Anak Agung Gede Jelantik, was again asked to send 1,200 elite troops to quell the rebellion. The war raged on from 1891 to 1894, and the better-armed Balinese-Mataram forces, supported by two modern warships, the Sri Mataram and the Sri Cakra, succeeded in capturing many rebellious villages and encircling the last stronghold held by the Sasak People.

The East Sasak rebels had actually begun writing to the Dutch as early as 1892, after their position came under increasing pressure from attacks by Balinese forces; however, the Dutch did not respond until November 8, 1894. The Dutch systematically shelled the Balinese forces’ positions in Cakranegara, destroying the palace and killing approximately 2,000 Balinese, while suffering 166 casualties themselves. By the end of November 1894, the Dutch had succeeded in crushing all resistance in Bali, with thousands of Balinese either killed, captured, or having committed ritual suicide (Puputan). Lombok and Karangasem subsequently became part of the Dutch East Indies, and the government was administered from Bali. Gusti Gede Jelantik was appointed regent by the Dutch in 1894, and he ruled until 1908.

=== Colonial Era ===
==== Dutch occupation ====
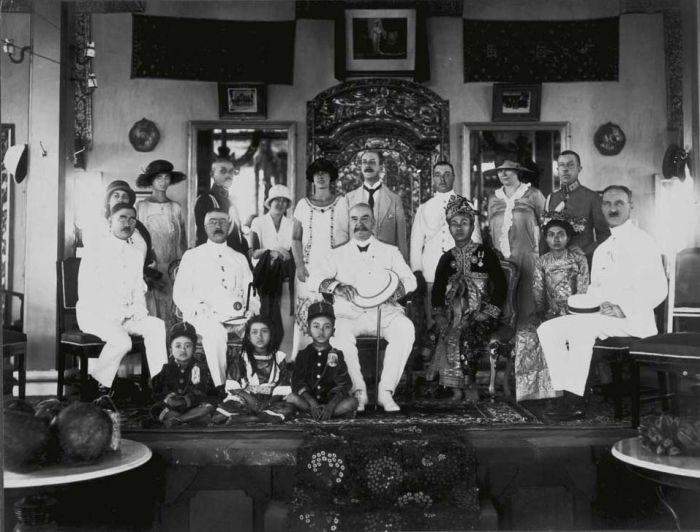
Anak Agung Agung Anglurah Ketut Karangasem receiving a visit from Governor General Dirk Fock in 1925.

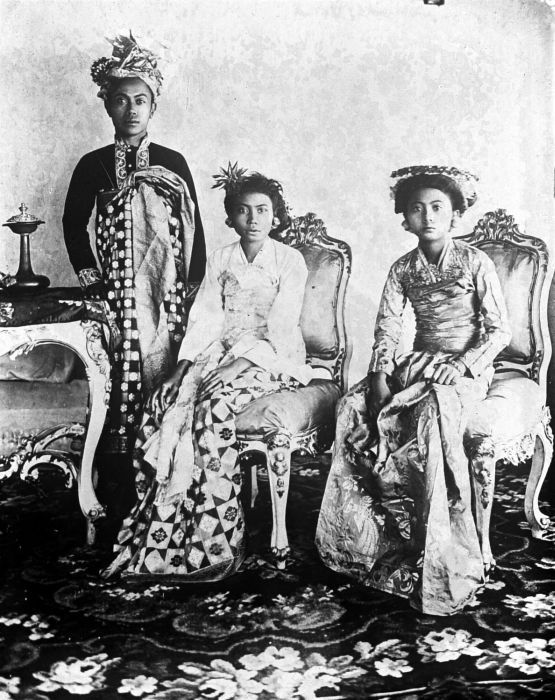
Anak Agung Agung Anglurah Ketut Karangasem with his wife. The furnishings of Puri Agung Karangasem shown in the photo were a gift from Queen Wilhelmina of the Netherlands.

Following the arrival of the Dutch, they influenced a change in government bureaucracy. In 1906, there were three forms of government in Bali:

- Rechtstreeks bestuurd gebied (direct administration) include Buleleng, Jembrana, and Lombok
- Self-governing regions (self-administration) are Badung, Tabanan, Klungkung, and Bangli
- Stedehouder (Dutch government representatives) are Gianyar and Karangasem

Thus, in the Kingdom of Karangasem, the successive Stedehouders (rulers) were I Gusti Gede Jelantik from 1894 to 1908, and Stedehouder I Gusti Bagus Jelantik, who held the title of Anak Agung Agung Anglurah Ketut Karangasem (Dewata di Maskerdam), from 1908 to 1950, which oversees 21 villages, namely Karangasem, Seraya, Bugbug, Ababi, Abang, Culik, Kubu, Tianyar, Pesedahan, Manggis, Antiga, Ulakan, and Bebandem. By Decree of the Governor-General of the Dutch East Indies dated December 16, 1921, No. 27 Stbl. No. 756 of 1921, effective January 1, 1922, the Gouvernements Lanschap of Karangasem was abolished and transformed into an autonomous region directly under the Dutch East Indies Government. The Karangasem Raad was established, chaired by Regent I Gusti Bagus Jelantik, while the position of Secretary was held by the Controleur of Karangasem.

As Regent, I Gusti Bagus Jelantik continued to use the title of Stedehouder. The number of districts, which had previously been 14, was further reduced to 8, namely: Rendang, Selat, Sidemen, Bebandem, Manggis, Karangasem, Abang, and Kubu. By Decree of the Governor-General of the Dutch East Indies dated September 4, 1928, No. 1, the title of Stedehouder was replaced with the title of Anak Agung Agung Anglurah Ketut Karangasem. By Decree of the Governor-General of the Dutch East Indies dated June 30, 1938, No. 1, effective July 1, 1938, he was appointed as the Zelfbestuur of Karangasem (head of the autonomous region). Concurrent with the establishment of the Zelfbestuur of Karangasem, effective July 1, 1938, the Zelfbestuurs throughout Bali, namely Klungkung, Bangli, Gianyar, Badung, Tabanan, Jembrana, and Buleleng, where the rulers of these autonomous regions (Zelfbestuur) were united in a federation of kings known as the Paruman Agung.

In the socio-cultural sphere, influenced by the education received in the 19th century under the Dutch Ethical Policy, many intellectual youths in various regions of Bali established youth, religious, and scientific associations and organizations. In 1925, an association named “Suryakanta” was founded in Singaraja, which also published a magazine of the same name. Suryakanta sought to advance Balinese society in the realm of knowledge and to abolish customs that were no longer in line with the times. Meanwhile, in Karangasem, an association named “Satya Samudaya Baudanda Bali-Lombok” was formed, whose members consisted of civil servants and the general public, with the aim of saving and collecting funds for a study fund.

=== Japanese occupation ===
After several battles, Japanese troops landed on Sanur Beach, Badung, on February 18 and 19, 1942. From Sanur, the Japanese troops entered the city of Denpasar without encountering any resistance. Subsequently, from Denpasar, the Japanese took control of all of Bali, including Karangasem. Initially, it was the Imperial Japanese Army (Rikugun) that established the foundation of Japanese rule in Bali. Later, once the situation had stabilized, administrative control was handed over to a civilian government. When the Japanese entered Bali, the Paruman Agung, or the council of Balinese kings, was reorganized into the Sutyo Renmei.

=== Indonesian independence ===
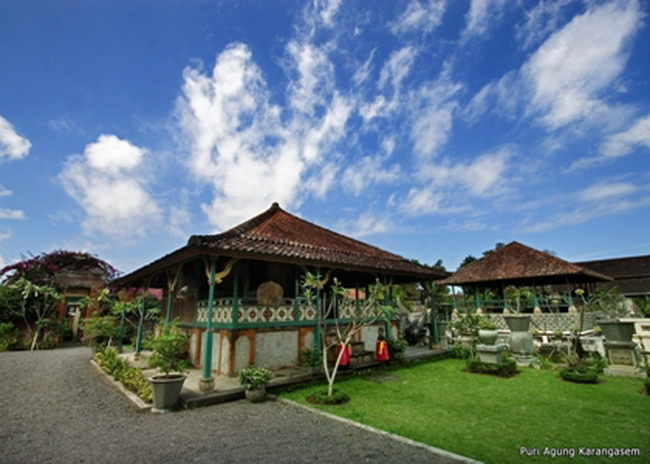
Karangasem Grand Palace in the city of Amlapura.

In 1945, following Japan’s surrender and the independence of the Republic of Indonesia, Bali became part of the Government of the State of East Indonesia. The State of East Indonesia dissolved, and all its territories were incorporated into the Republic of Indonesia on August 17, 1950. The autonomous kingdoms (swapraja) in Bali were reorganized into the Council of Kings, headquartered in Denpasar and chaired by a king. In October 1950, the Karangasem Swapraja government took the form of the Karangasem Governing Council, chaired by the head of the Daily Governing Council, a position held by the Head of the Swapraja (King) and assisted by members of the Daily Government Council.

In 1951, the title “Member of the Executive Council” was changed to “Member of the Karangasem Government Council.” Pursuant to Law No. 69 of 1958, effective December 1, 1958, the autonomous regions in Bali were reorganized into second-level administrative regions equivalent to regencies, including Karangasem.

== List of rajas ==
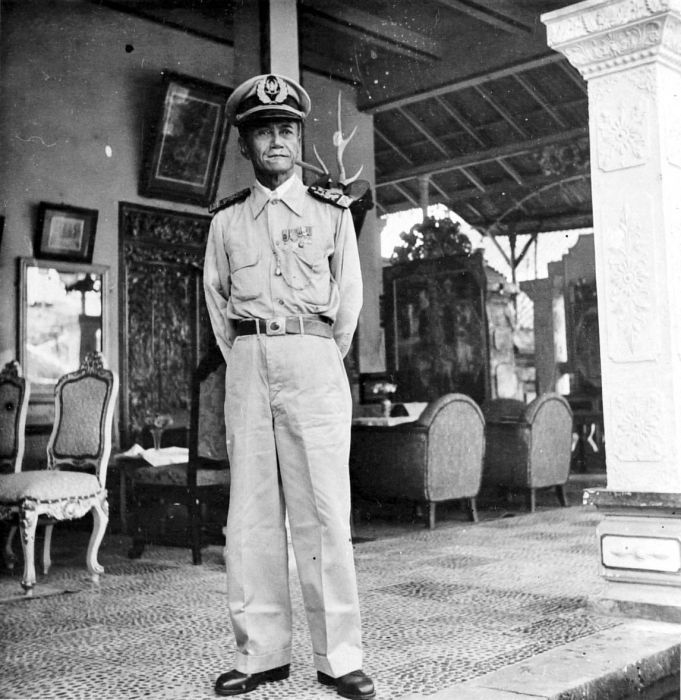
Anak Agung Anglurah Ketut Karangasem at Maskerdam Hall, the main building of Puri Agung Karangasem, in 1949.

- Gusti Nyoman Karang (1600)
- Anglurah Ketut Karang
- Anglurah Nengah Karangasem
- Anglurah Ketut Karangasem (1691-1692)
- Anglurah Made Karang
- Gusti Wayahan Karangasem (w. 1730)
- Anglurah Made Karangasem Sakti alias Bagawan Atapa Rare (1730-1775)
- Gusti Gede Ngurah Karangasem (1775–1806)
- Gusti Gede Ngurah Lanang (first period, 1806–1822)
- Gusti Gede Ngurah Pahang (1822)
- Gusti Gede Ngurah Lanang (second period, 1822-1828)
- Gusti Bagus Karang (1828–1838)
- Gusti Gede Ngurah Karangasem (1838–1849)
- Gusti Made Jungutan alias Gusti Made Karangasem (1849-1850)
- Gusti Gede Putu (as a subordinate ruler, 1850-1893)
- Gusti Gede Oka (as a subordinate ruler, 1850-1890)
- Gusti Gede Jelantik (1890–1908)
- Anak Agung Anglurah Ketut Karangasem (1908-1966)
- Anak Agung Agung Made Jelantik (as the head of the Puri Agung Karangasem extended family, (1967-2007)
- Anak Agung Gede Putra Agung (as the head of the Puri Agung Karangasem extended family, (2009-2023)

== Gallery ==
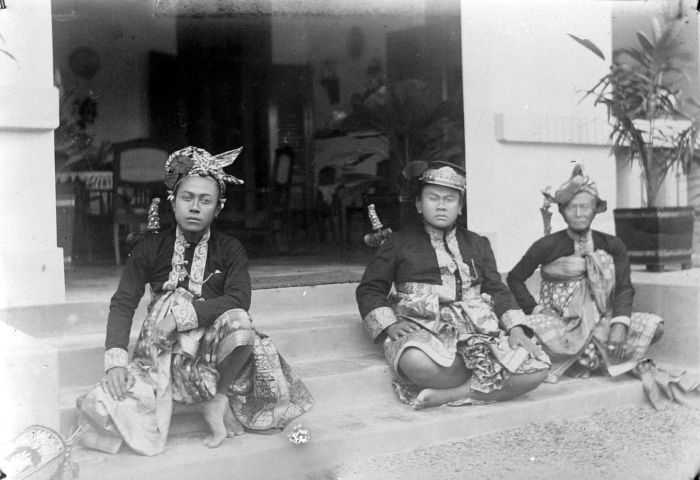
Anak Agung Agung Anglurah Ketut Karangasem with the kings of Gianyar and Bangli.

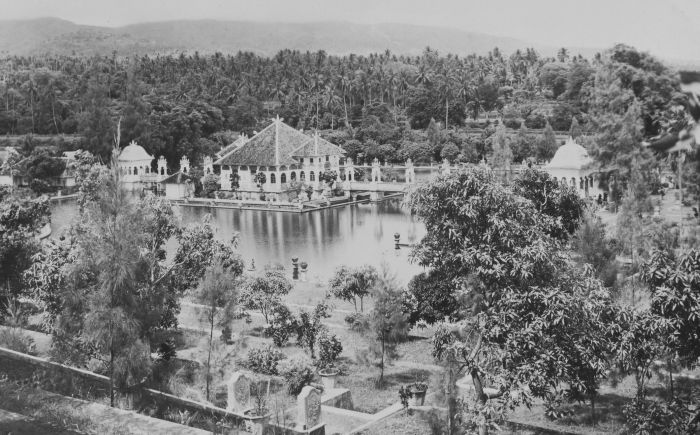
Ujung Sukasada Park in 1935. The park was built in 1909 on the initiative of Anak Agung Anglurah Ketut Karangasem.

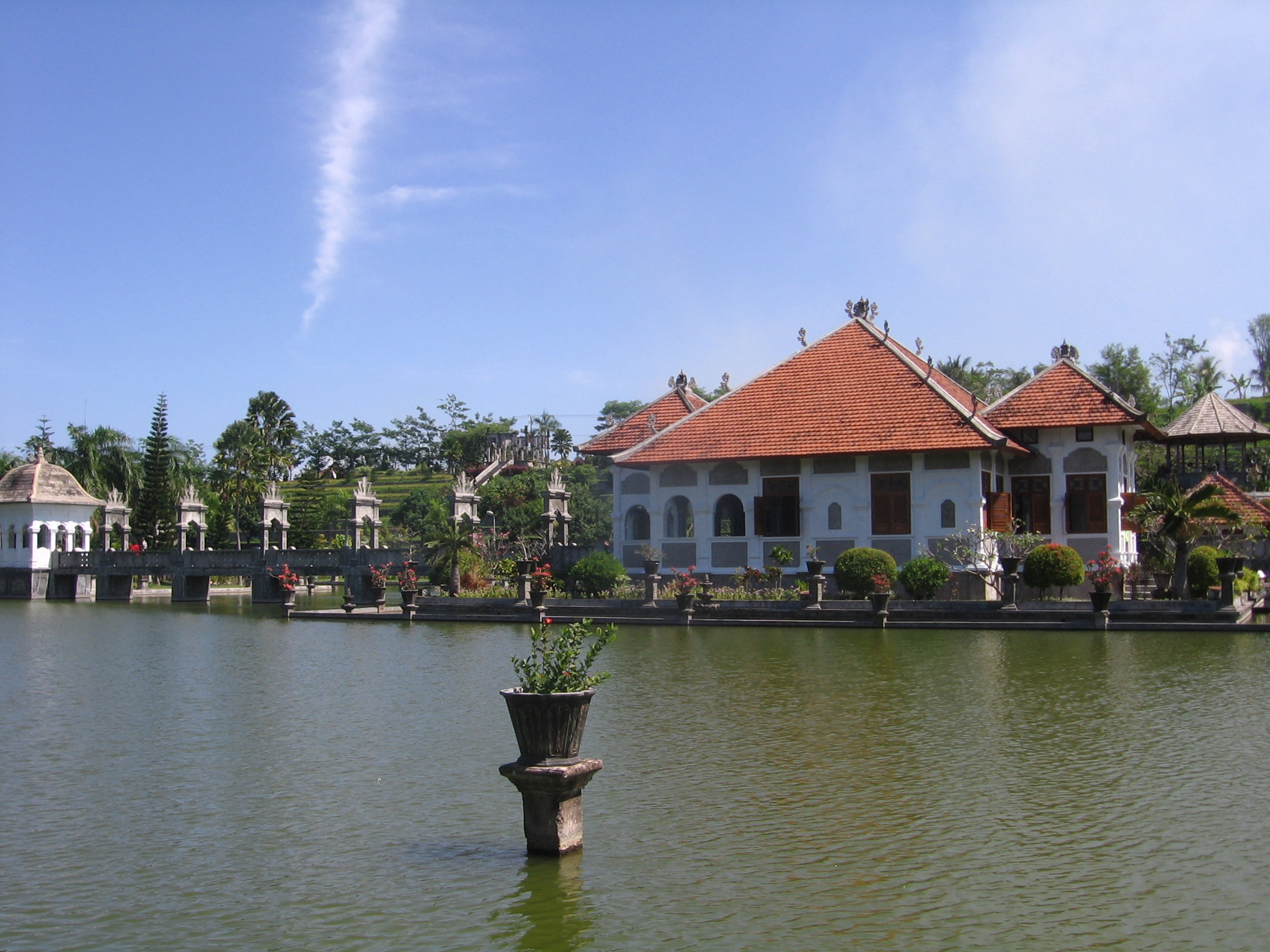
Ujung Sukasada Park in 2014, which is now one of the main tourist attractions of Bali.

== See also ==
- List of monarchs of Bali
- History of Bali
- Dutch Intervention in Lombok dan Karangasem
- Karangasem Regency
- Puri di Bali
- Taman Ujung

== External sites ==
- (in Indonesian) Situs Pemerintah Provinsi Bali
- (in Indonesian) Sejarah Kota Amlapura sebagai Ibu Kota Kerajaan Karangasem
- (Inggris) Puri Karangasem Historical Society
