= Dutch intervention in Lombok and Karangasem =

1894 intervention and colonization by Dutch East Indies

Dutch intervention in Lombok and Karangasem (1894)
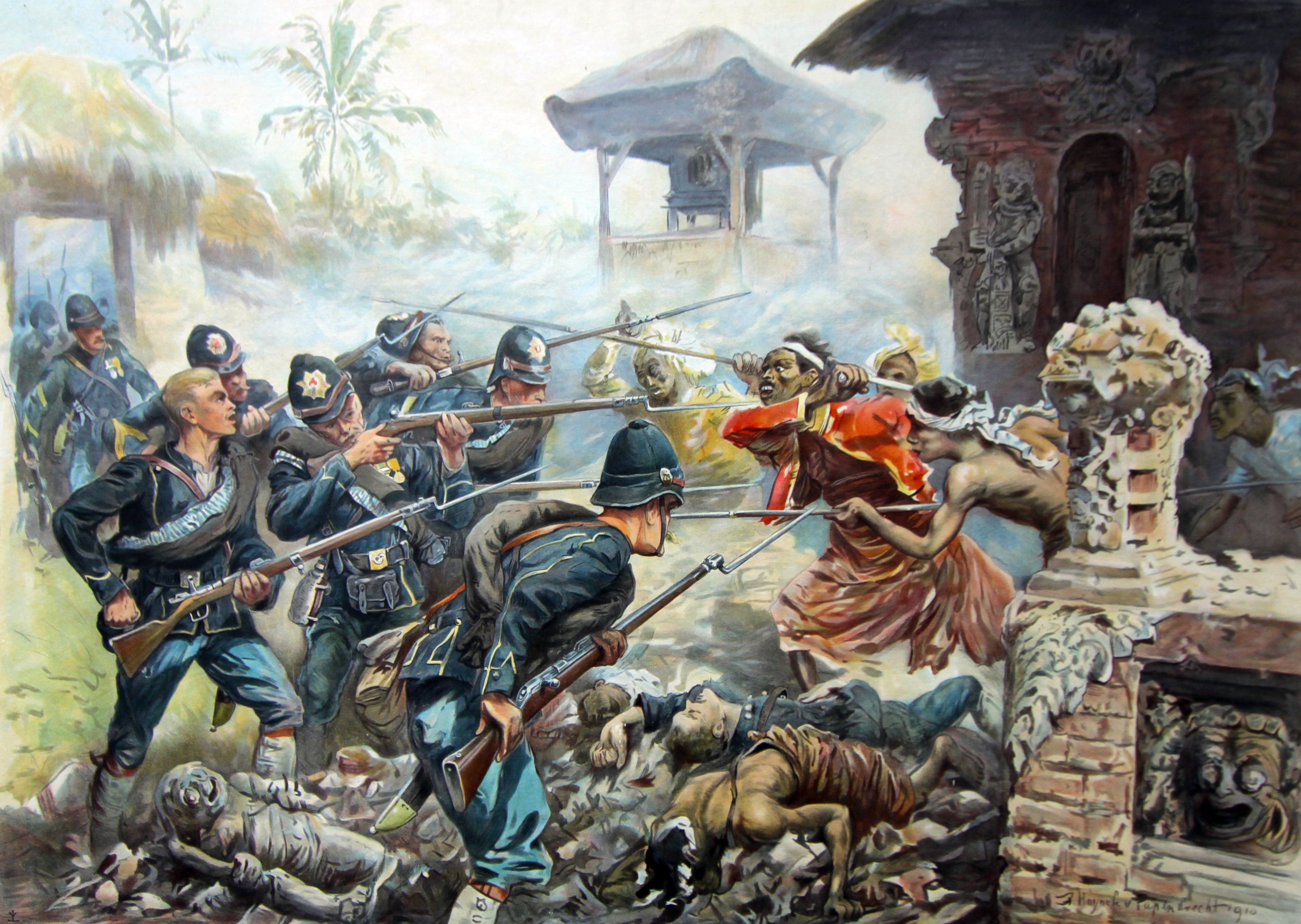
- Dutch illustration on the assault of Cakranegara palace.
Date	July–November 1894
Location	Lombok
Result	Dutch victory
Territorial changes	Dutch control of Lombok and Karangasem.

Belligerents
Dutch East Indies; Eastern Sasak Rebels	Mataram–Cakranegara Kingdom; Kingdom of Karangasem; Western Sasak Colony

Commanders and leaders
General-Major Jacobus Augustinus Vetter (Commander); General-Major Petrus Paulus Hermans van Ham (Second in command) †; East Sasak Rebels	Ratu Agung Gede Ngurah Karangasem; Anak Agung Made Karangasem; Anak Agung gede Jelantik; West Sasak Colony soldiers

Strength
2,200 (July expedition)	12,000 elite troops to quash the rebellion and 500 soldiers to against the Dutch

Casualties and losses
500 (August 1894); 166 (November 1894); Thousand of East Sasak Rebels	Thousand (Balinese and Pro-Mataram Sasaknese)

The Dutch intervention in Lombok and Karangasem took place in 1894, and is part of the string of Dutch interventions in and around Bali that led to complete colonization of both Bali and Lombok by the early 20th century.

== Preceding political context ==
The island of Lombok is predominantly inhabited by the Sasak, the majority of which adopted Islam since the 16th century. Following the decline of the Selaparang Kingdom, Balinese rulers from the west and Makassarese rulers from the Bima Sultanate of Sumbawa in the east compete for political influence in Lombok throughout the 17th to 18th century. By the early 19th century, the Cakranegara court – a branch of eastern Bali’s Karangasem Kingdom – emerged as Lombok's most powerful polity. While the court's influence was strongest in western Lombok with their base in Mataram, the court was able to rule the whole island from around 1839.

Around the 19th century as well, colonial Dutch government began to pursue imperialist policies which favored territorial expansion and subjugation of the archipelago's indigenous polities. Initially, the Dutch acted as allies to Cakranegara while also limiting its foreign relations. Cakranegara had trade connections with the British (based in Singapore) and talks of a bilateral treaty were forming before Dutch presented their own treaty, signed in 1843. The Dutch-Cakranetara treaty recognized the sovereignty of Cakranegara in Lombok and ensured freedom from Dutch interventions in internal matters, in exchange of Cakranegara's sole allegiance to the Dutch, the suspension of tawan karang, (Note: Traditional right to claim jetsam from shipwrecks.) and sending of delegations to Batavia once every three years. Cakranegara would gave support to the Dutch during the Dutch intervention in Bali (1849), and was rewarded with the overlordship over Karangasem. Despite this allegiance and the 1843 treaty, Dutch colonial administration continued to conspire further intervention strategies into Lombok, especially after 1880s when rumors began to circulate that the island was rich in minerals.

Through robust tax system and trade activities, the Cakranegara court managed to accrue considerable wealth. By the 1870s during the reign of Ratu Agung Gede Ngurah Karangasem, (Note: In various writings, his name has been rendered as Ratoe Agoeng-Agoeng G, de Ngoerah Karangassem, Ratoe Agoeng G’dé Ngoerah Karang Asem, Ratu Agung2 Ngurah, and Anak Agung Gede Ngurah Karangasem Cakranegara.) Cakranegara had built itself into perhaps the richest court in eastern Malay archipelago. Relations between the ruling Balinese elite and Sasak population were amicable in western Lombok, but the situation was more contentious in eastern Lombok, where Sasak chiefs resented Balinese rule and taxes. The Sasak of east Lombok incited rebellious streaks in 1855 and 1871, but the Cakranegara court was able to subdue these rebellions before widespread damage occurred. Local chronicles also ascribe rising discontent to the appointment of Prince Anak Agung Made Karangasem as the Raja's representative in 1884. The prince was remembered as having clear favoritism towards Balinese subjects and frequently imposed disproportionately cruel sentences for any dissent from Sasak subjects. The raja, already advanced in age and too caught up with his personal agenda for hegemony in Bali, did not do much to allay Prince Made's misdeeds towards the Sasak. This building resentment became the impetus of the events to follow.

== Praya incident and Sasak rebellion ==
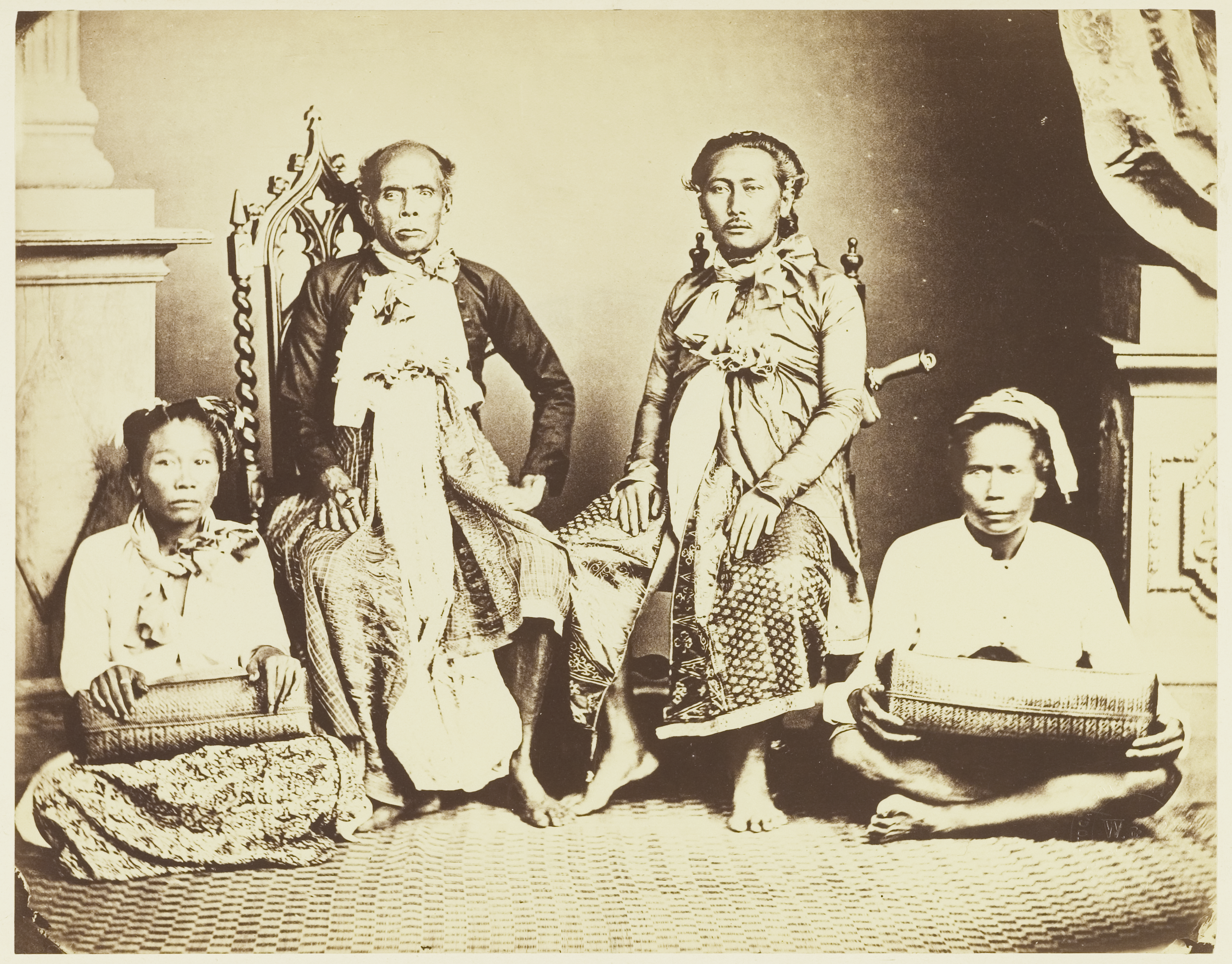
Ratu Agung Gede Ngurah Karangasem (center left), reigning king of Cakranegara preceding the Dutch intervention, photographed with Crown Prince Anak Agung Ketut Karangasem (center right) around 1885.

Trouble erupted in 1891. In that year, Ratu Agung Gede Ngurah Karangasem ordered a military conscription for an excursion to the Klungkung kingdom of Bali. Despite being based in Lombok and ruled over subjects that are predominantly Sasak, the Raja considered himself as part of the Balinese realm and aspired to become the supreme ruler of Bali. The conscription and expedition was extremely unpopular in eastern Lombok where there was little regard for the Raja's Bali-centric aspirations. When the population of Praya refused to comply, Crown Prince Anak Agung Ketut Karangasem and Prince Anak Agung Made Karangasem were sent to enforce the court's order and subsequently executed dissenting Sasaks in the area. But instead of submitting to Cakranegara, the harsh treatment in Praya caused outraged Sasak population to openly rebel. On 25 August 1891, Prince Anak Agung Ketut Karangasem was armed with 8,000 troops to quell the rebellion and on 8 September, 3,000 more troops were sent. As the Cakranegara army seemed in trouble, the ruler asked for the help of the vassal ruler of Karangasem, Anak Agung Gde Jelantik, to send additional 1,200 elite troops.

The war raged on from 1891 to 1894. There were still operating rebel strongholds, but the war has devastated the countryside and caused famine in much of eastern Lombok. Faced with mounting losses, several Sasak chiefs formally sought Dutch intervention and support in October 1892.

== Initial Dutch landing ==
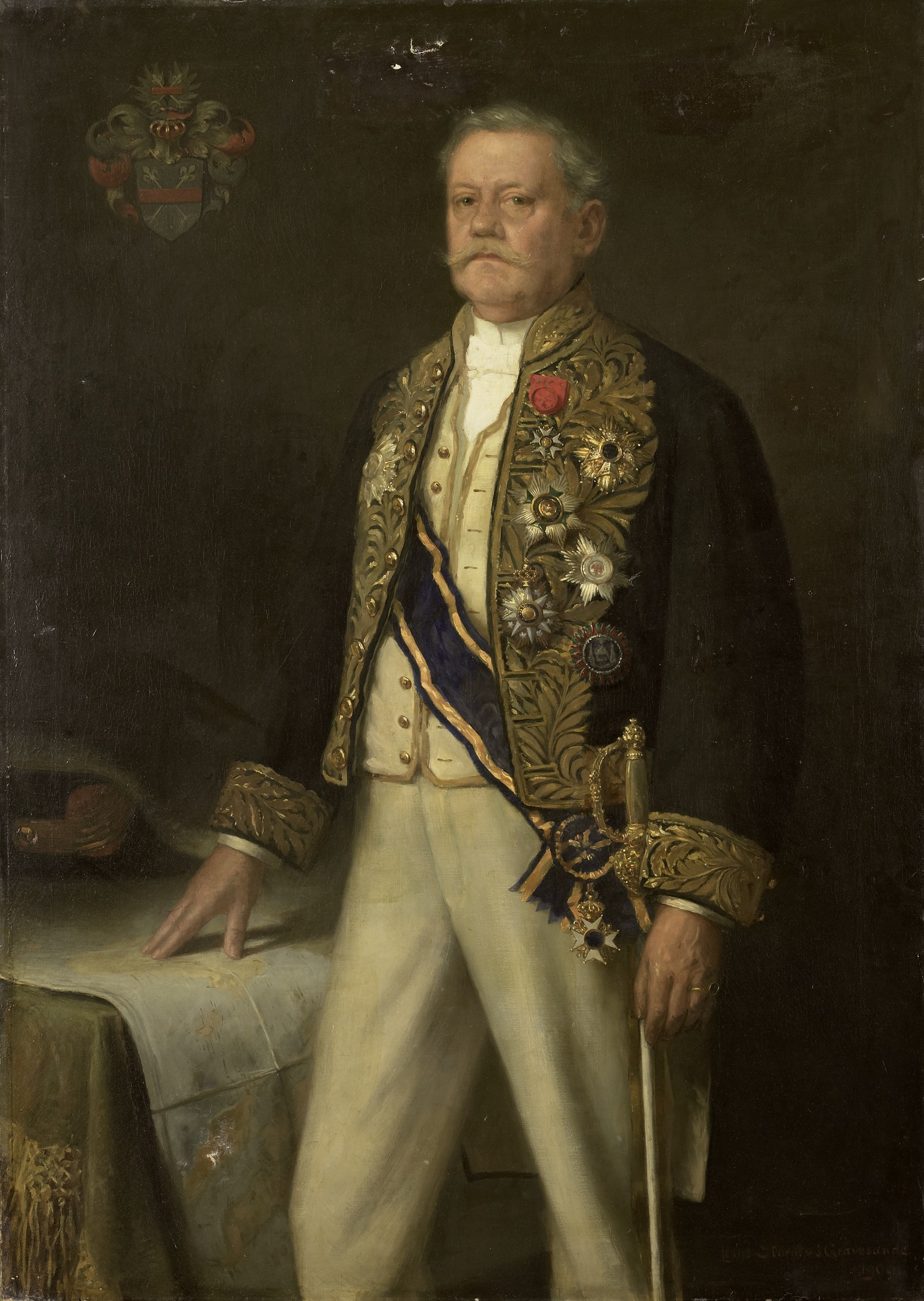
Governor General Carel Herman Aart van der Wijck, who approved Dutch military expedition to Lombok on 27 May 1894.

The Dutch, seeing the Sasak request as an opportunity to extend their control in Lombok, chose to support the Sasak chiefs. Resident Matthijs Cornelis Dannenbargh stationed in Bali were especially eager for the colonial government to take decisive action. Governor-General Cornelis Pijnacker Hordijk approved of a naval blockade that disrupted Cakaranegara's supply of weapons and supplies from Singapore, but further military action was not permitted. As events continue to unfold, however, Governor-General Aart van der Wijck approved and announced a military expedition to Lombok on 27 May 1894. Three ships were sent from Batavia, the Prins Hendrik, the Tromp, and the Koningin Emma (the largest warship in the Dutch navy at the time) transporting 107 officer, 1,320 European soldiers, 948 indigenous soldiers and 386 horses.

On 3 June 1894, Resident Dannenbargh and Controleur Frederik Albert Liefrinck landed at the port of Ampenan and delivered a series of ultimatums to the Cakranegara court under threat of military punishment. This was against the 1843 treaty which stipulated that the Dutch would not interfere with Cakranegara affairs in Lombok, as Cakranegara delegations pointed out. But faced with superior military force, Cakranegara could not outright rejected Dutch demands. The Dutch blamed Prince Made as the primary reason for Sasak discontent, and surmised that Crown Prince Ketut could be manipulated as compliant puppet ruler later on. Thus, the Dutch demanded extradition of Prince Made and the abdication of the Raja in favor of Crown Prince Ketut.

The extradition terms was the most difficult to accept for the Raja. The Dutch refused negotiation while Prince Made has a lot of supporters within court. The Raja decided to disgrace Prince Made by accusation of incest, a capital offense that would alienate him from the court, and sentenced him to death on July 11. Although Prince Made insisted on his innocence, he ultimately relented to the sentence and was executed by a kris stab to the heart in accordance to Balinese customs. After Prince Made's funeral, the Dutch contingent arrived at the Cakranegara court. Cakranegara submitted to the rest of the Dutch demands and a formal treaty began to be drafted.

== Dutch assault ==
=== Ambush at Mayura and beginning of Dutch offensive (August-September 1894) ===
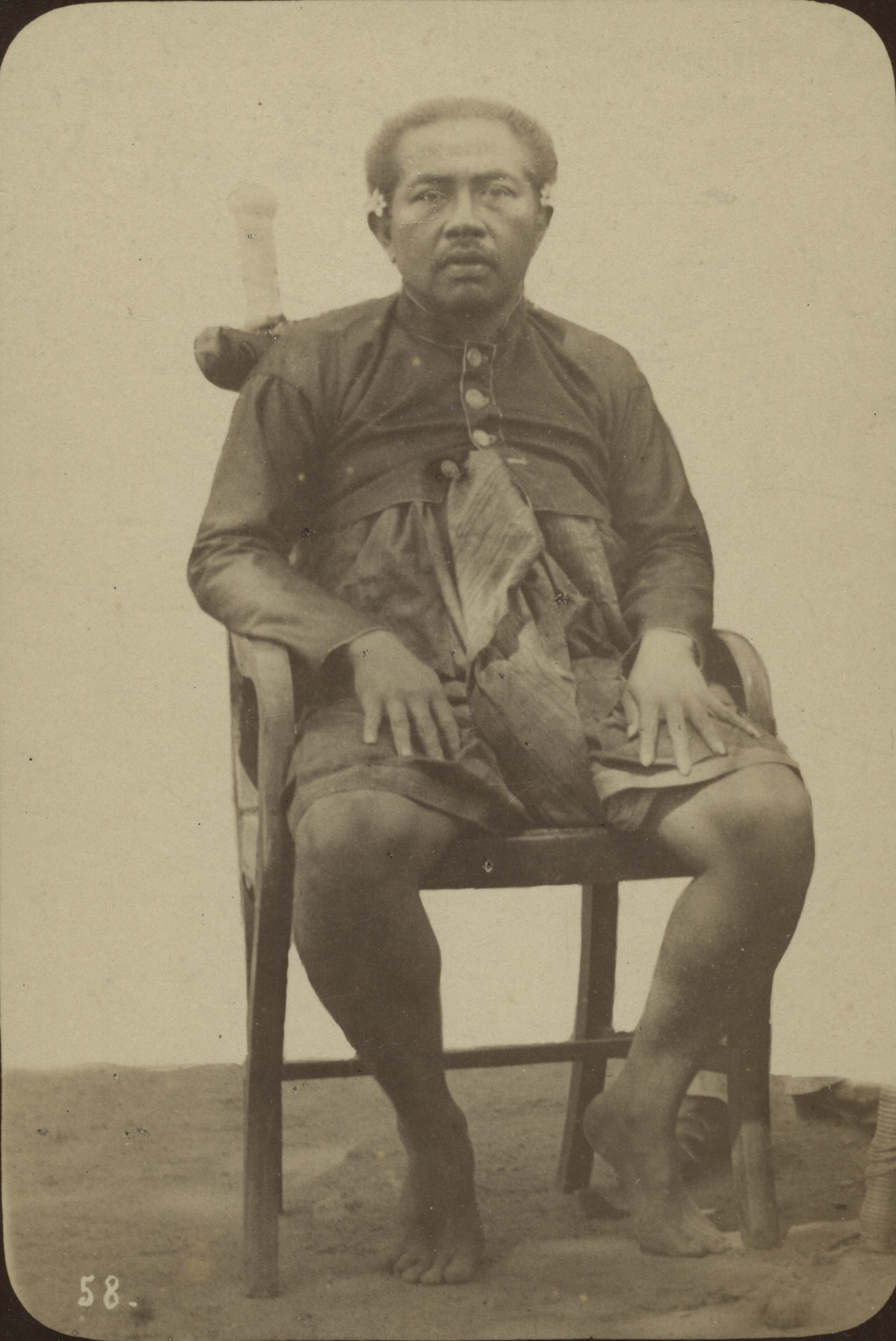
Crown Prince Anak Agung Ketut, who planned the Mayura ambush during the Dutch interventions, photographed around the time of Dutch intervention

As the translation of the draft treaty began to circulate, the treaty's unfavorable terms became more obvious to the Cakranegara court. Crown Prince Ketut and his supporters organized an ambush against Dutch forces without the Raja's knowledge. On the night of August 25, the Cakranegara force attacked the 900-strong Dutch military camp in Mayura Palace, killing more than 500 soldiers, sailors and coolies. Included among the dead was General Petrus Paulus Hermans van Ham, commander of the expedition. The Dutch retreated and entrenched themselves in the Ampenan harbor. This also caused diplomatic breakdown and the Dutch launched their offensive assault. By the end of September, Dutch forces have destroyed the Mataram palace, followed by the Pagesangan palace. Despite the Raja's pleas and promise of submission to increasingly humiliating terms, the Dutch did not stop their advances.

=== Assault on Cakranegara palace (November 1894) ===
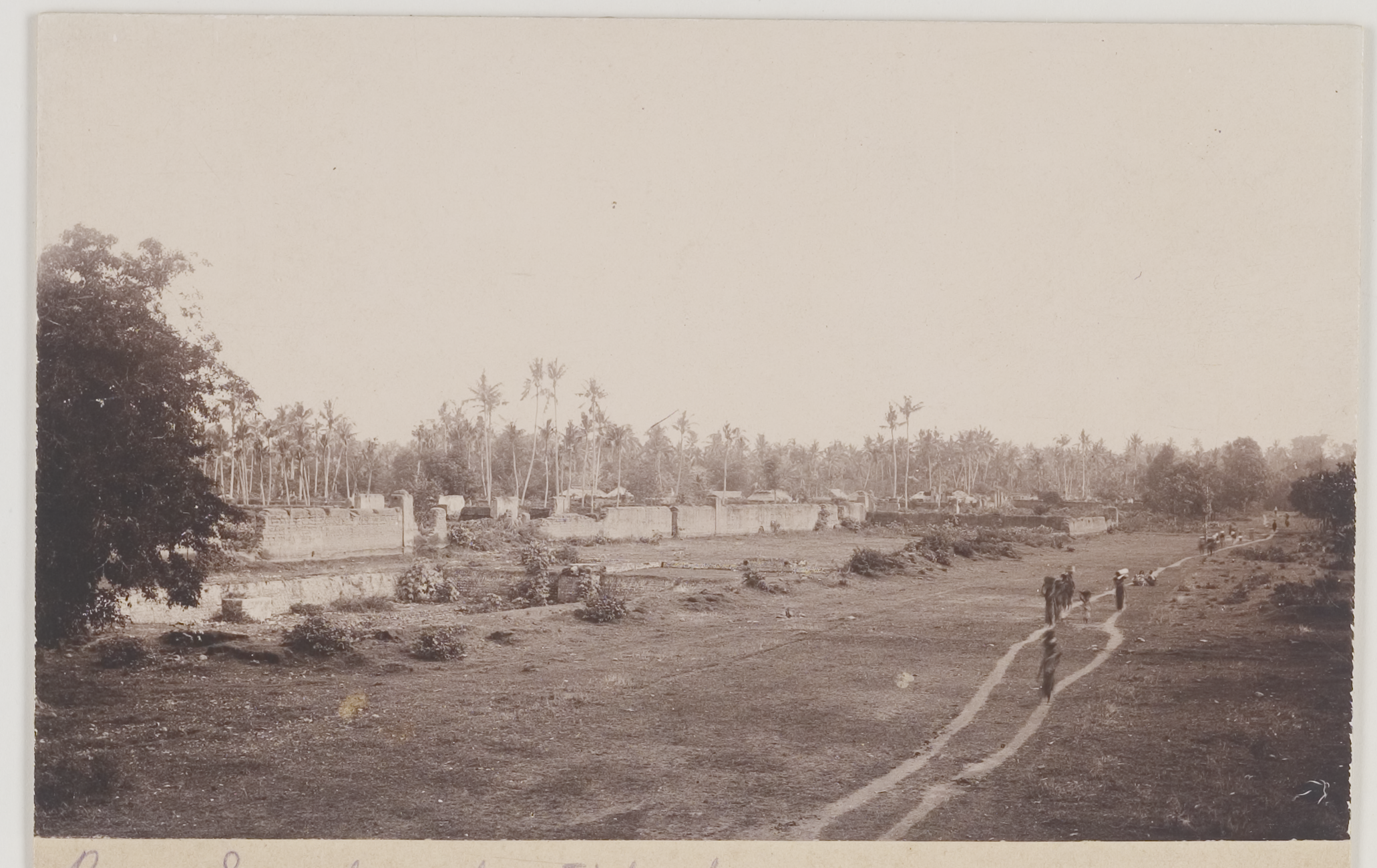
The destroyed Cakranegara palace after the November 1894 assault.

After General Jacobus Augustinus Vetter came with reinforcements, the Dutch force proceeded to march towards the last stronghold of Cakranegara in Cakranegara palace. On 8 November 1894, the Dutch made systematic artillery bombardments on the palace. Approximately 2,000 Balinese were killed in the assault while the Dutch lost 166 men. On the night between the 18 and 19 November, the Raja and his remaining followers evacuated to the village of Sasari. The next morning, Dutch forces found the palace abandoned. Cakranegara forces however have left behind the palace's considerable valuables, which the Dutch proceed to thoroughly looted. It is difficult to accurately calculate the total loss of items as looting was unsystematic, with every soldier taking whatever they please as war trophies. According to one estimate:

one thousand krisses, betel sets and other golden objects, 230 kg in gold money and 7199 kg of silver coins […] 400 ancient Javanese manuscripts […] palace rings, spearheads, golden tobacco-boxes and opium-pipes and headdresses were taken.

— Jos van Beurden

By the end of November 1894, the Dutch had annihilated the Balinese positions, with thousands of dead, and the Balinese surrendered or committed puputan, ritual of last suicide attack. The Raja surrendered on November 20, 1894.

== Aftermath ==
On the morning of November 23, 1894, the defeated Raja, four of his surviving family members, and a small number retinues were secretly taken aboard HMSS Prins Hendrik by the Dutch to be exiled in Batavia. As one of his final acts in Lombok, the Raja ordered a basket of sand from the shores of Lombok to be taken with him. He died a year later in Batavia, on May 20, 1895. Lombok and Karangasem became part of the Dutch East Indies, and were administered from Bali. Gusti Gede Jelantik was appointed as Dutch regent in 1894, and ruled until 1902. Soon Bangli and Gianyar region in Bali also accepted Dutch suzerainty, but southern Bali kept resisting until the Dutch intervention in Bali (1906).

=== Looted items ===
Many objects looted from Cakranegara, often referred as Lombokschatten "Lombok treasures" in Dutch, became the collection of public institutions such as the Koloniaal Institut (later Royal Tropical Institute) in Amsterdam and Royal Batavian Society of Arts and Sciences in Batavia. In 2023 and 2024, a large number of Cakranegara objects formerly under custody of Dutch museums were returned to Indonesia under mutual agreements of repatriation and restitution of past colonial wrongdoings. As of 2026, these objects are under the custody of the Indonesian Heritage Agency and the Museum Nasional in Jakarta, with ongoing considerations to forward them to the West Nusa Tenggara State Museum (Museum NTB) in Lombok.

A notable manuscript looted from Cakranegara is a copy of the 13th century Majapahit work in Old Javanese language titled Nagarakṛtāgama (or Deśavarṇana). At the time, the Cakranegara palm leaf manuscript was the only known copy and its content was published by J.L.A. Brandes. A generation of Dutch scholars participated in translating the poem, and in the early 20th century, the Nagarakṛtāgama became an inspiration and foundation of the Indonesian independence movement. In 1970, during the state visit of President Suharto to the Netherlands, the manuscript was returned to Indonesia.

== Gallery ==
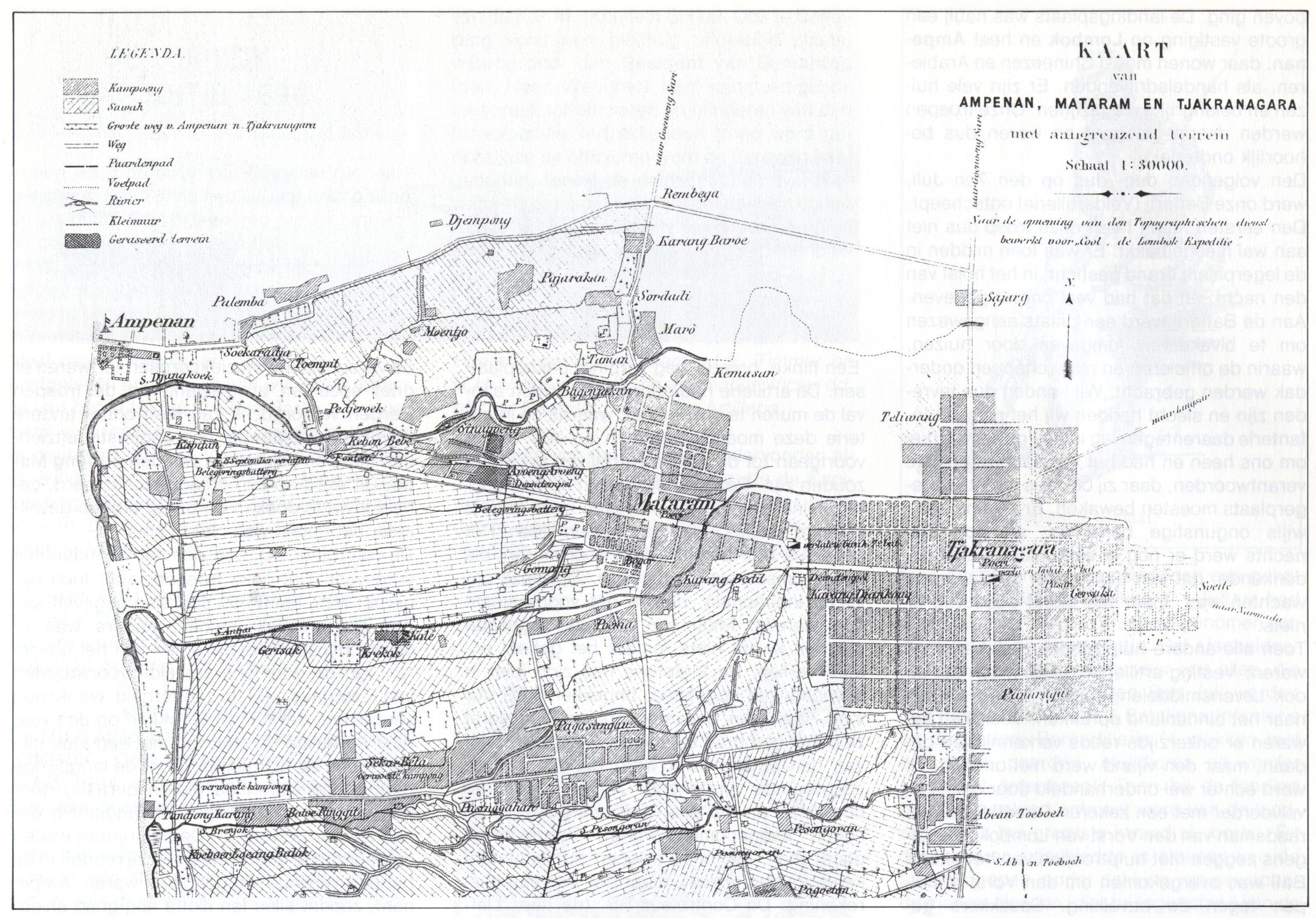
Map of Mataram and surrounding area in 1894, including Ampenan harbor and Cakranegara palace.

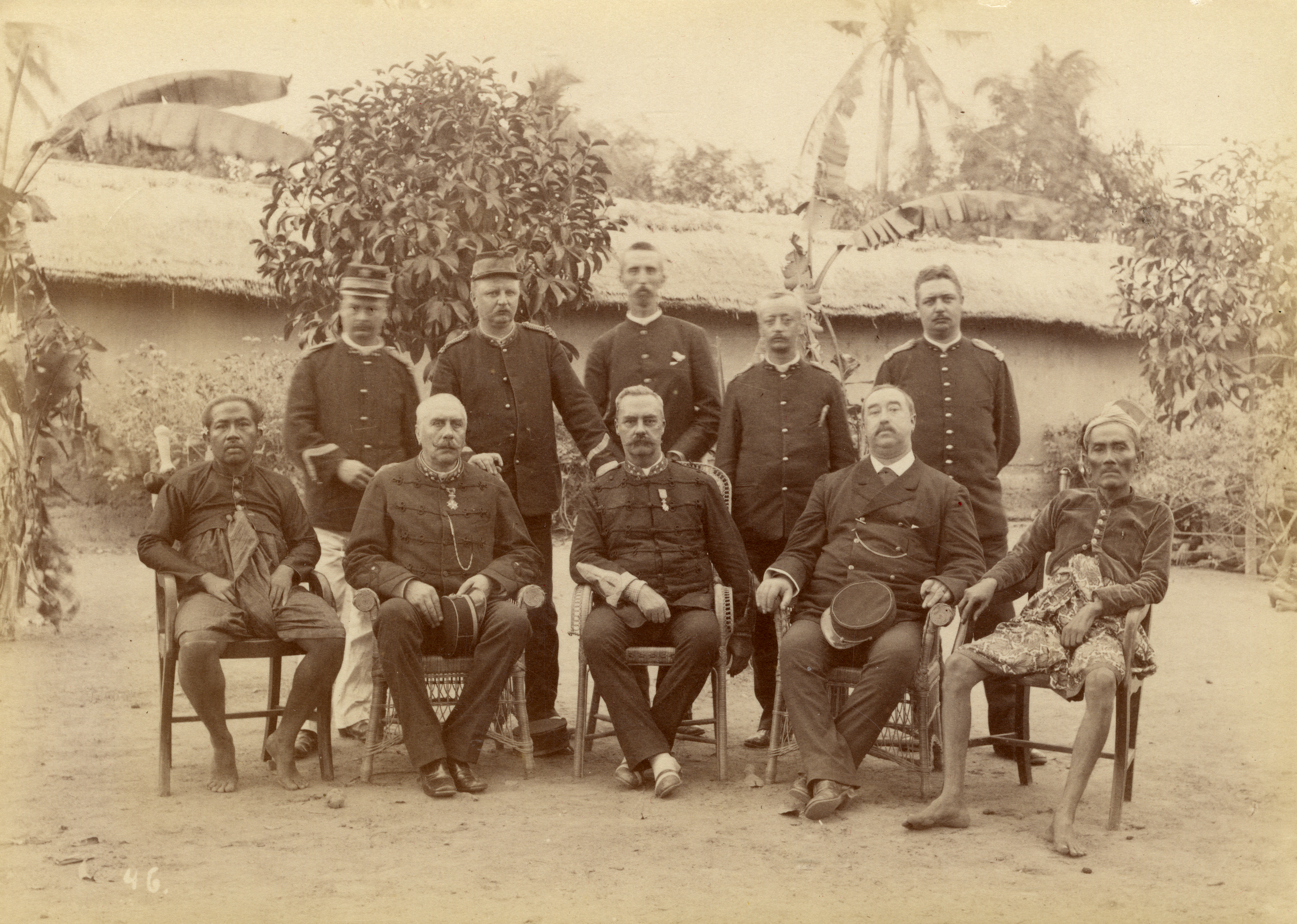
Dutch representatives (including General Petrus Paulus Hermans van Ham, General Jacobus Augustinus Vetter, and Resident Matthijs Cornelis Dannenbargh) with Cakranegara representatives (Crown Prince Anak Agung Ketut Karangasem and Gusti Jelantik) during negotiations after Dutch landing.

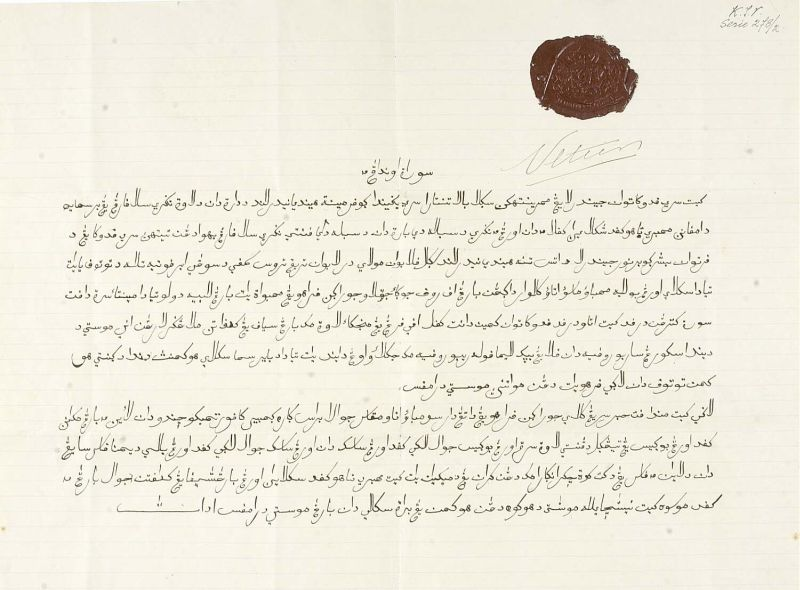
Proclamation issued by General Vetter in 1894 announcing the closure of the Ampenan harbor.

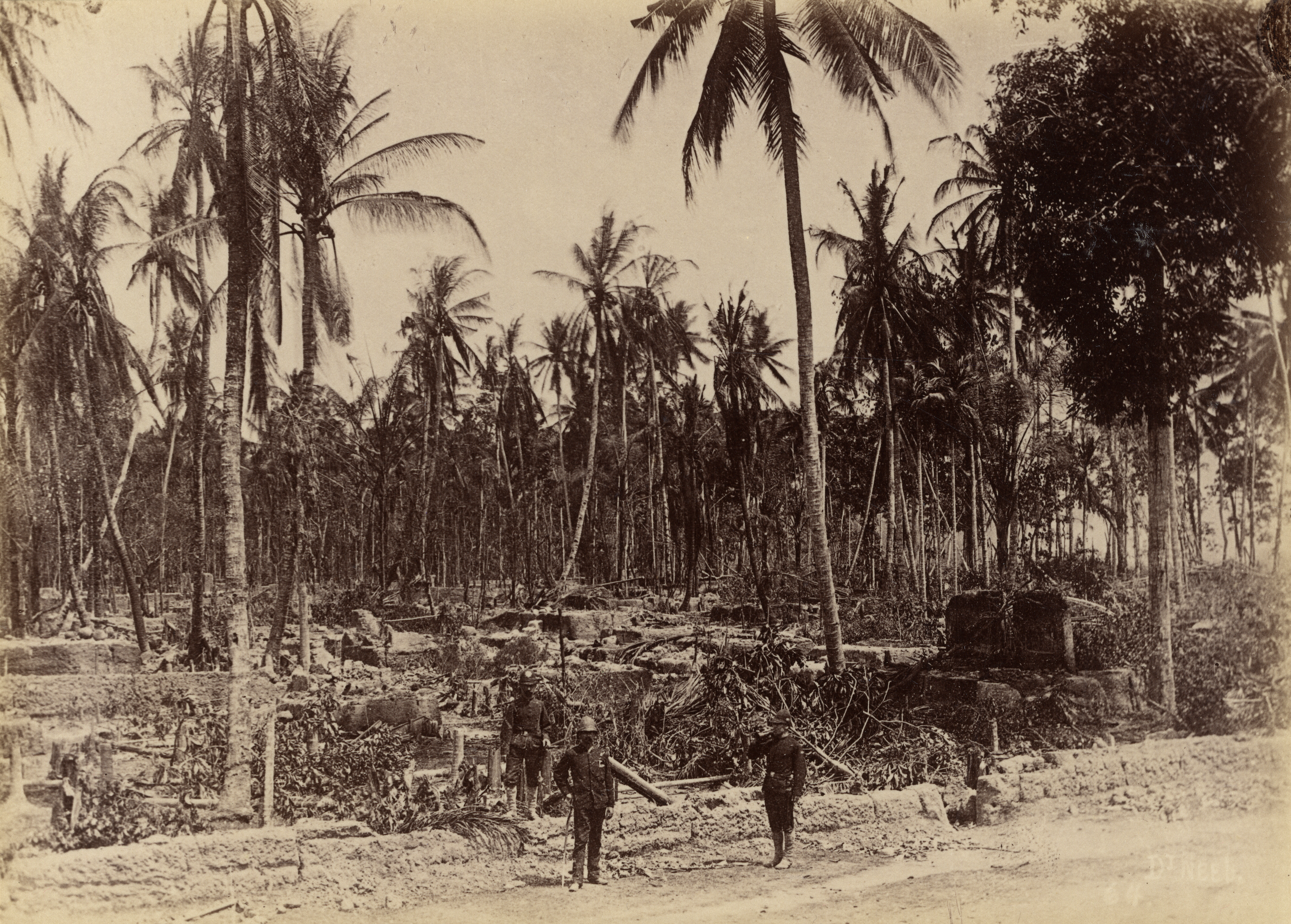
The destroyed Pagesangan palace on September 1894.

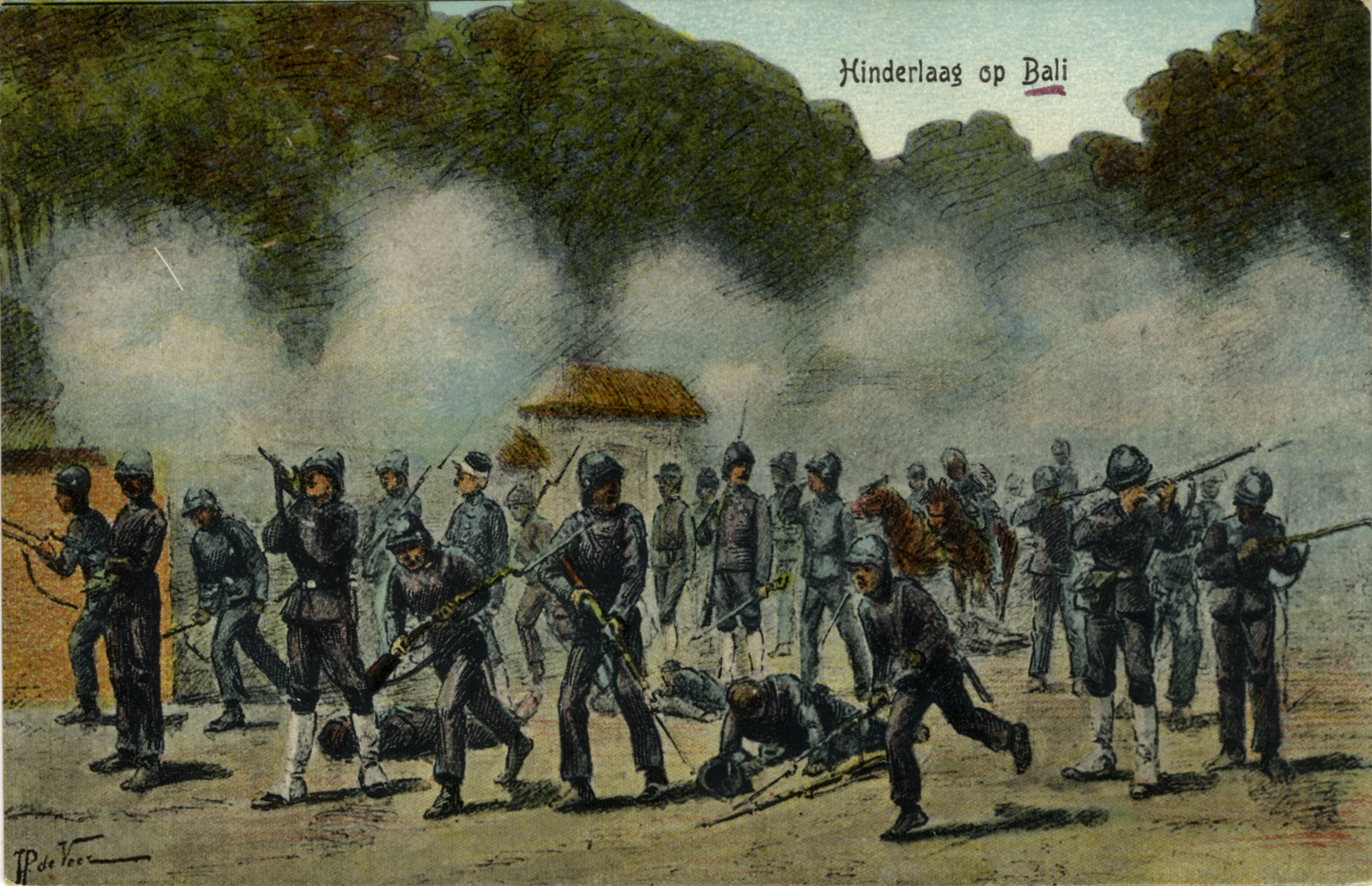
Dutch depiction of the assault to Cakranegara palace on November 1894.

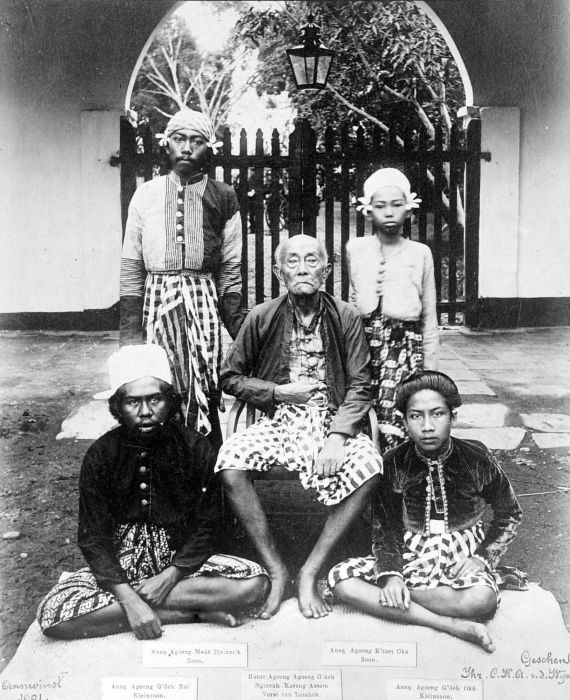
Ratu Agung Gede Ngurah Karangasem and surviving family members during their exile in Batavia.

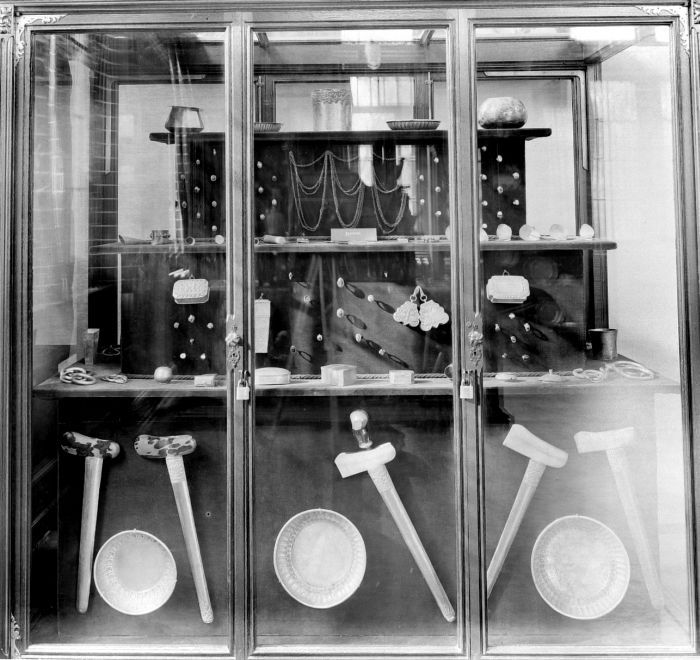
Looted Lombok treasures displayed at the Dutch Koloniaal Institut

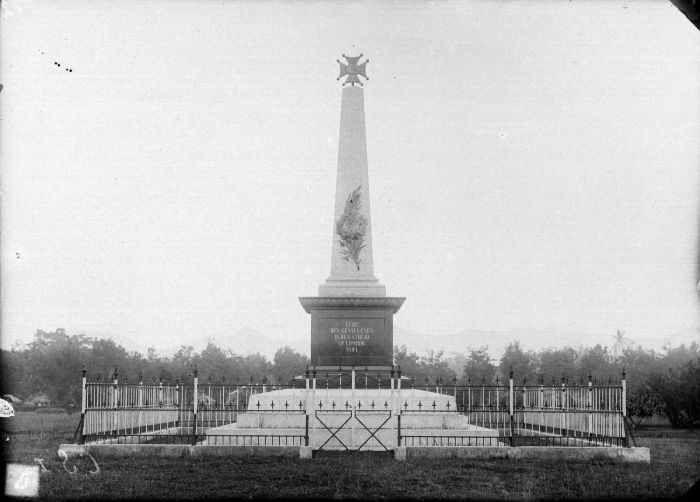
Amsterdam monument to the 1894 Dutch expedition

== See also ==
- History of Bali
