= Amlapura =

Amlapura Kuta Negara Karangasem
- Town

Native transcription(s)
  - Balinese: ᬅᬫ᭄ᬮᬧᬸᬭ
- Location in Bali, Karangasem Regency and Indonesia Amlapura (Indonesia)
- Coordinates: 8°26′49.2″S 115°36′54″E
- Country: Indonesia
- Region: Bali
- Province: Bali
- Regency: Karangasem
- Kuta Negara Karangasem: 22 June 1611
- Amlapura: 17 August 1971

Area
  - Total: 3.048 km^{2} (1.177 sq mi)

Population (2010)
  - Total: 37.308
- Time zone: UTC+8 (WITA)

Amlapura (Balinese: ᬅᬫ᭄ᬮᬧᬸᬭ; Indonesian pronunciation: [amlaˈpura]) formerly known as Kuta Negara Karangasem (Balinese: ᬓᬸᬢᬦᭂᬕᬭᬓᬭᬗᬲᭂᬫ᭄; Indonesian pronunciation: [ˌkut̪a nəˌɡara karaˈŋasəm]) is a town and the regency seat of the Karangasem Regency, Bali, Indonesia. It was renamed in 1963 after the eruption of Mount Agung. The population of the town in 2010 was 37.308.

== History ==
After the eruption of Mount Agung in 1963, a new city had to be built since most of the office complexes built during the Dutch East Indies Government were destroyed by the lava floods.

The name Amlapura includes amla ("fruit") and pura ("place"). It refers to the name of the previous Puri Kelodan, namely Puri Amlaraja. It is also a reminder of a place named in the colophon of the Negarakretagama manuscript, in the village of Negarakretagama or Warnana (Griya Pidada Karangasem), stating that the lontar was finished writing in Amlanegantun (wus puput sinurat ring Amlanagantu). In addition, there are also mentions in the Babad Dalem.

The 1991 song Amlapura on Tin Machine's album Tin Machine II cites the place, which David Bowie the frontman of the band had visited.

== Awards ==
In 2011, for a third consecutive time, Amlapura City received the Adipura Award as Indonesia's Cleanest Small City and also received the Adiwiyata Award for a fourth consecutive time for the Cleanest Elementary School.

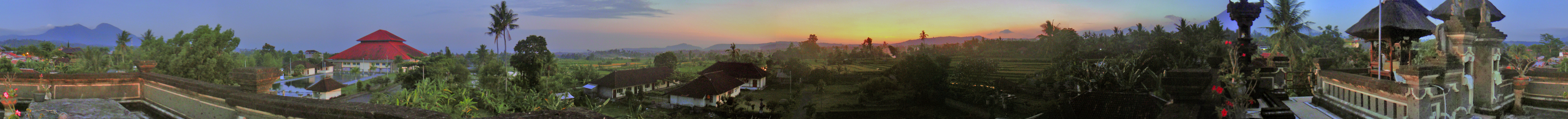
Amlapura panorama in the afternoon

== Climate ==
Amlapura has a tropical savanna climate (Aw) with moderate to little rainfall from April to October and heavy rainfall from November to March.

Climate data for Amlapura
Month	Jan	Feb	Mar	Apr	May	Jun	Jul	Aug	Sep	Oct	Nov	Dec	Year
Mean daily maximum °C (°F)	30.2 (86.4)	30.4 (86.7)	30.4 (86.7)	31.1 (88.0)	30.7 (87.3)	30.0 (86.0)	29.4 (84.9)	29.8 (85.6)	30.5 (86.9)	31.0 (87.8)	31.1 (88.0)	30.6 (87.1)	30.4 (86.8)
Daily mean °C (°F)	26.3 (79.3)	26.4 (79.5)	26.2 (79.2)	26.4 (79.5)	25.9 (78.6)	25.1 (77.2)	24.7 (76.5)	25.0 (77.0)	25.8 (78.4)	26.3 (79.3)	26.7 (80.1)	26.4 (79.5)	25.9 (78.7)
Mean daily minimum °C (°F)	22.5 (72.5)	22.5 (72.5)	22.1 (71.8)	21.7 (71.1)	21.2 (70.2)	20.3 (68.5)	20.1 (68.2)	20.3 (68.5)	21.1 (70.0)	21.7 (71.1)	22.3 (72.1)	22.3 (72.1)	21.5 (70.7)
Average rainfall mm (inches)	267 (10.5)	220 (8.7)	178 (7.0)	106 (4.2)	113 (4.4)	73 (2.9)	81 (3.2)	52 (2.0)	35 (1.4)	82 (3.2)	125 (4.9)	204 (8.0)	1,536 (60.4)
Source: Climate-Data.org

== Lontars in Penaban ==
The Pustaka Lontar Museum in Penaban, located 5 km north of Amlapura, is a lontar museum, restoration workshop and research center. It was inaugurated in November 2017 in the presence of lontar maestro Ida I Dewa Gede Catra and Dutch lontar researcher Professor Hinzler, the latter also one of the museum's curators. Its various buildings, of traditional Balinese style, spread over one and a half hectares. As of 2021, it held 313 cakap (volumes of lontar). On demand, they also do what could be termed as 'home service', where they help lontar owners to take care of their lontars. The museum's team has digitized and put online 130 lontars. The center provides an unabridged formation for Sang Kul Putih, one of the two disciplines of pemangku (priest). As an introduction to the world of lontars, it also hold workshops to Balinese hymns, lontar manuscript making, and Balinese alphabet. The museum operates on donations.
