= Ban =

Ban, or BAN, may refer to:

== Law ==
- Ban (law), a decree that prohibits something, sometimes a form of censorship, being denied from entering or using the place/item
  - Imperial ban (Reichsacht), a form of outlawry in the medieval Holy Roman Empire
- Ban (medieval), the sovereign's power to command
  - King's ban (Königsbann), a royal command or prohibition in the medieval Holy Roman Empire
- Herem (disambiguation), a Hebrew word usually translated as "the ban"
- A ban or "banning order" could be served on people in apartheid-era South Africa

== Internet ==
- Ban (Internet), the banning of individual users from websites
- Body Area Network, a wireless network of wearable computing devices
- IP ban, a block set up by a server or website that blocks requests originating from particular IP addresses or ranges of addresses
- Shadow ban or stealth ban, a practice used in managing online communities

== People ==
- Ban (Chinese surname), a Chinese surname
- Ban (Korean name), a Korean surname
  - Ban Ki-moon, United Nations Secretary-General
- Ban Ziad Tariq, Iraqi psychiatric (1991–2025)
- King Ban, a king from the Matter of Britain
- Ban (title), a noble title used in Central and Southeastern Europe (Romania, Croatia, Bosnia and Hungary)
  - Ban of Bosnia
  - Ban of Croatia
- Lynn Ban (1973–2025), Singapore-born jewelry designer
- Marijan Ban (born 1963), Croatian musician, frontman of the rock band Daleka obala
- Matija Ban (1818–1903), Serbo-Croatian poet
- Mitrofan Ban (1841–1920), Serbian-Montenegrin cleric
- Nenad Ban (born 1966), Croatian biochemist
- Oana Ban (born 1986), Romanian artistic gymnast
- Olga Ban (1926–1943), Croatian partisan
- Shigeru Ban (born 1957), Japanese architect
- Y Ban (born 1961), real name Phạm Thị Xuân Ban, Vietnamese writer
- Zoran Ban (born 1973), Croatian football player

== Places ==
- Ban, Burkina Faso, a town in Burkina Faso
- Bans, Jura, a commune in eastern France
- Ban, Murree, a village and UC of Rawalpindi District, Pakistan
- Ban, an alternate name of Ben, a city in Iran
- Ban, Iran, a village in Markazi Province, Iran
- Ban, a village in Bănișor Commune, Sălaj County, Romania
- Ban (river), a river in Sălaj County, Romania
- Ban, habitation in Thai muban
- Ban, a settlement in Sarawak, Malaysia
- Ban, Kubu, Karangasem, a village in Bali
- Bans, Raebareli, a village in Uttar Pradesh, India

== Codes ==
- Balinese language (ISO 639-2 and -3 code "ban"), spoken in Indonesia
- BAN, the National Rail code for Banbury railway station in the county of Oxfordshire, UK
- BAN, the Chapman code for Banffshire, historic county in Scotland
- BAN, the IOC code for Bangladesh at the Olympics
- BAN, the IATA code for Basongo Airport in the Democratic Republic of the Congo
- BAN, the ISO provincial code for Bataan, Philippines

== Other ==
- An alternate spelling for "bann" as in banns of marriage
- Paiban, a clapper used in Chinese music, alternately called BAN)
- Ban (unit), a logarithmic unit of information or weight of evidence
- Ban (deodorant), a brand name deodorant & antiperspirant
- Ban (plural: bani), a coin, the 1/100 part of a Romanian leu or Moldovan leu
- "Ban" (song), a 2021 single by Sakurazaka46
- Basel Action Network
- British Approved Name, for a pharmaceutical substance
- Burrows–Abadi–Needham logic, BAN logic, used to analyze authentication protocols
- Muban, or Ban for short, is the lowest administrative subdivision of Thailand
- "B.A.N." (Atlanta), an episode of the American TV series Atlanta
- "B.A.N.", a song by Saweetie

== Fictional characters ==
- Ban (The Seven Deadly Sins), a character in the manga series The Seven Deadly Sins
- Ban Mido, a character in the manga series GetBackers
- BanBan Akaza, nicknamed Ban, a character in the television series Tokusou Sentai Dekaranger

== See also ==
- Bann (disambiguation)
- Banned (disambiguation)
- Banning (disambiguation)
- Block (disambiguation)
