= Banning =

Banning may refer to:

== People ==
- Banning (surname)
- Banning Eyre, an American guitarist and writer
- Banning Liebscher, an American youth pastor for Jesus Culture
- Banning Lyon, a plaintiff in a 1990s medical fraud case against NME, now Tenet Health

== U.S. Communities ==
- Banning, California, named for Phineas Banning
- Banning, Delaware, a defunct town
- Banning, Georgia
- Banning, Minnesota, a ghost town

== Other places ==
- Banning Dam in Thousand Oaks, California
- Banning High School (disambiguation)
- Banning House, a museum in Los Angeles, California
- Banning Municipal Airport in Banning, California
- Banning Pass, an alternate name for San Gorgonio Pass
- Banning State Park in Minnesota

== Other uses ==
- Banning (film), released in 1967
- Banning (internet), a technical measure that restricts access to information or resources
- Banning order, a measure used by the apartheid-era South African government to silence dissent
- Shadow banning, a practice in which a user of some online community is made invisible to all other users

== See also ==
- Ban (disambiguation)
- Banningham
- Censorship
