= List of incumbent regional heads and deputy regional heads in Bali =

The following is an article about the list of Regional Heads and Deputy Regional Heads in 9 regencies/cities in Bali who are currently still serving.

== List ==
Regency/ City	Photo of the Regent/ Mayor	Regent/ Mayor	Photo of Deputy Regent/ Mayor	Deputy Regent/ Mayor	Taking Office	End of Office (Planned)	Ref.
Badung; Regency List of Regents/Deputy Regents		I Wayan Adi Arnawa		Bagus Alit Sucipta	20 February 2025	20 February 2030	
Bangli; Regency List of Regents/Deputy Regents	pus	Sang Nyoman Sedana Arta	pus	I Wayan Diar	20 February 2025	20 February 2030	
Buleleng; Regency List of Regents/Deputy Regents	pus	I Nyoman Sutjidra	pus	Gede Supriatna	20 February 2025	20 February 2030	
Gianyar; Regency List of Regents/Deputy Regents	pus	I Made Agus Mahayastra	pus	Anak Agung Gde Mayun	20 February 2025	20 February 2030	
Jembrana; Regency List of Regents/Deputy Regents	pus	I Made Kembang Hartawan	pus	I Gede Ngurah Patriana Krisna	20 February 2025	20 February 2030	
Karangasem; Regency List of Regents/Deputy Regents	pus	I Gusti Putu Parwata	pus	Pandu Prapanca Lagosa	20 February 2025	20 February 2030	
Klungkung; Regency List of Regents/Deputy Regents	pus	I Made Satria	pus	Tjokorda Gde Surya Putra	20 February 2025	20 February 2030	
Tabanan; Regency List of Regents/Deputy Regents	pus	I Komang Gede Sanjaya	pus	I Made Dirga	20 February 2025	20 February 2030	
Denpasar; City List of Mayors/Deputy mayors	pus	I Gusti Ngurah Jaya Negara	pus	I Kadek Agus Arya Wibawa	20 February 2025	20 February 2030	

Notes

- "Commencement of office" is the inauguration date at the beginning or during the current term of office. For acting regents/mayors, it is the date of appointment or extension as acting regent/mayor.
- Based on the Constitutional Court decision Number 27/PUU-XXII/2024, the Governor and Deputy Governor, Regent and Deputy Regent, and Mayor and Deputy Mayor elected in 2020 shall serve until the inauguration of the Governor and Deputy Governor, Regent and Deputy Regent, and Mayor and Deputy Mayor elected in the 2024 national simultaneous elections as long as the term of office does not exceed 5 (five) years.

== See also ==
- Bali
