= Bebandem =

- District

- Location withn Karangasem and Bali
- Coordinates: 8°24′16.56″S 115°32′22.20″E
- Country: Indonesia
- Province: Bali
- Regency: Karangasem Regency\

Area
  - Total: 81.86 km^{2} (31.61 sq mi)

Population
  - Estimate (mid 2022): 56,800
- Time zone: UTC+8 (WITA)
- Postal code: 80861

Bebandem District is a village and district (kecamatan) in Karangasem Regency, Bali, Indonesia. The area is 81.86 km^{2} and at the 2010 Census the population numbered 45,160. the latest official estimate (as at mid 2022) is 56,800.

== Administrative division ==
Bebandem District consists of eight rural villages (desa) :

- Bebandem Village
- Giri Buana Village
- Budakeling Village
- Bungaya Village
- Bungaya Kangin Village
- Jungutan Village
- Macang Village
- Sibetan village
