= Banning (surname) =

Banning is an English and German surname. Notable people with the surname include:

== Nonfictional ==
- Edwin T. Banning (1864–1940), an American architect
- Émile Banning (1836–1898), a Belgian civil servant
- Henry B. Banning (1836–1881), an American Civil War general and Congressional Representative
- James Banning (1900–1933), an American aviation pioneer
- Jan Banning (born 1954), a Dutch photographer and artist
- Jim Banning (1865–1952), a catcher in American Major League Baseball
- Joanne Banning (born 1977), an Australian field hockey player
- Lance Banning (1942–2006), an American historian
- Leonard Banning (1910-unk), a British broadcaster
- Leslie Banning (1930–2014), an American film actress
- Lex Banning (1921–1965), an Australian lyric poet
- Margaret Culkin Banning (1891–1982), an American author
- Mary Elizabeth Banning (1822–1903), an American mycologist and botanical illustrator
- Phineas Banning (1830–1885), an American businessman
- Willem Banning (1888–1971), a Dutch politician

== Fictional ==
- Banning, a surname used in the 1960s television show Days of Our Lives
  - David Banning
  - Scotty Banning
  - Scott Banning
  - Janet Banning
- Peter Banning, a character in the 1991 film Hook
- Mike Banning, a character name in the 1967 American film Banning
- Mike Banning, the main character in the Has Fallen film series

== See also ==
- Banning (disambiguation)
