= Bann =

Bann may refer to:

- Banns of marriage
- River Bann, in Northern Ireland
  - Bann Rowing Club, Coleraine, Northern Ireland
- River Bann (Wexford), County Wexford, Ireland
- Bann, Germany, a municipality in Rhineland-Palatinate, Germany
- HMS Bann, various ships of Britain's Royal Navy
- Bann clay, a variety of diatomaceous earth of the Lower Bann valley in Northern Ireland

== People ==
- Bill Bann (1902–1973), Scottish footballer
- Blair Bann (born 1988), Canadian volleyball player
- Stephen Bann (born 1942), British art historian

== See also ==
- Ban (disambiguation)
