= Bugbug =

Area in Bali, Indonesia

Coordinates: 8.4833°S 115.5833°E

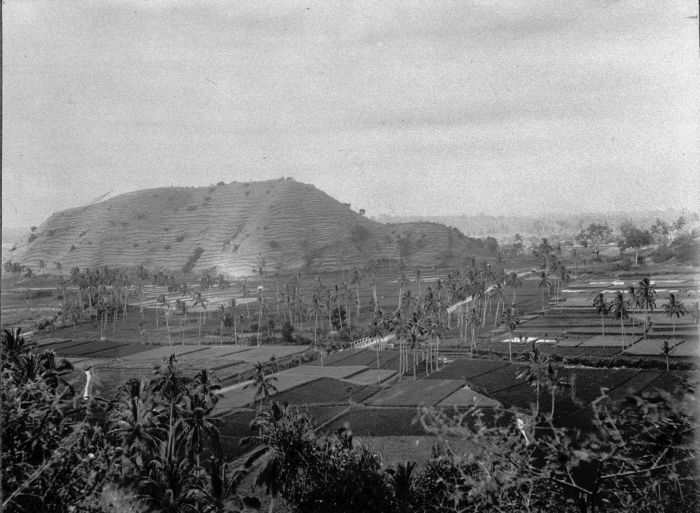
Rice fields in the volcanic landscape of Bugbug

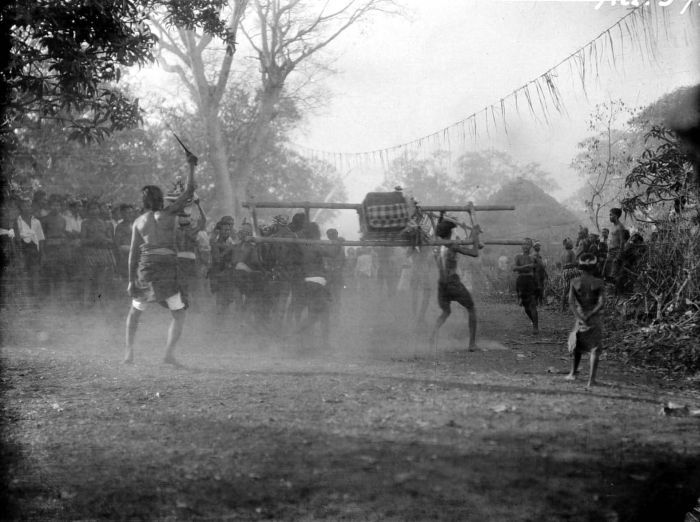
Religious festival

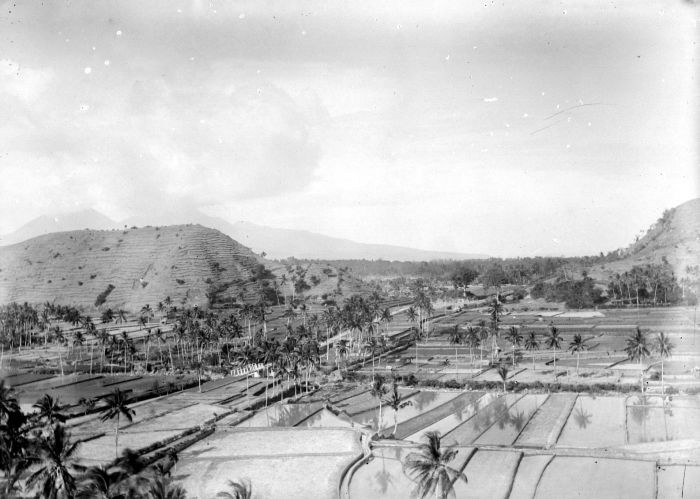
Landscape

Bugbug is an area of Karangasem Regency, Bali. Indonesia. It is located east of Candidasa and its inhabitants celebrate the Perang Dawa (war of the gods) every other year at full moon of the fourth month (October). People from nearby villages then climb to the top of a hill and sacrifice pigs by hanging them in trees. A beach is hidden among two cliffs / hills, Bugbug Cliff and Prasi Cliff.
