= I Gusti Putu Parwata =

Indonesian politician (born 1974)

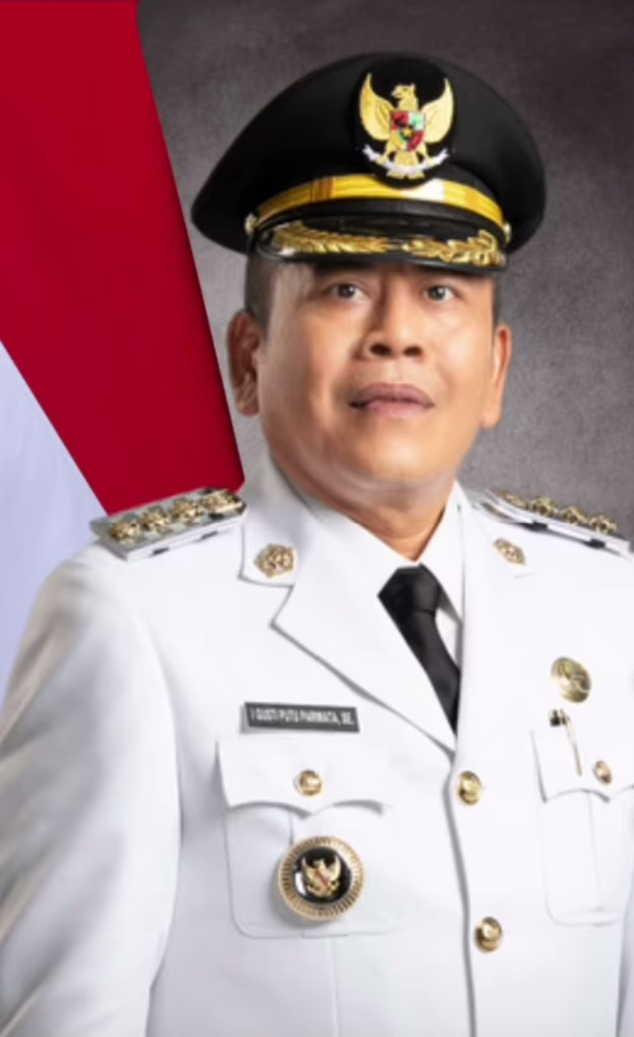

10th Regent of Karangasem
- Incumbent
- Assumed office 20 February 2025
- President: Prabowo Subianto
- Governor: I Wayan Koster
- Deputy: I Wayan Pandu Prapanca Lagosa
- Preceded by: I Gede Dana

Personal details
- Born: November 5, 1974 (age 51) Subagan, Karangasem Regency, Bali, Indonesia
- Party: Nasdem Party
- Spouse: Ni Made Mas Parwata
- Parents: I Gusti Made Tusan (father); I Gusti Ayu Mas Sumatri (mother)
- Education: Warmadewa University (S.E.)
- Occupation: Politician

I Gusti Putu Parwata, better known as Gus Par (born 5 November 1974) is an Indonesian politician from the Nasdem Party who served as Regent of Karangasem for the 2025–2030 term. He served since 20 February 2025 after being inaugurated by President Prabowo Subianto at the Istana Negara, Jakarta.

In the 2024 Karangasem regency election, Gus Par ran for Regent of Karangasem for the 2025–2030 term, partnering with former PDI-P politician I Wayan Pandu Prapanca Lagosa. This pair emerged victorious, securing 145.344 votes or 52,85% of the total valid votes.

Political offices
Preceded by I Gede Dana	Regent of Karangasem; 2025–2030	Succeeded by Incumbent
