= Ban (Korean name) =

- Hangul: 반
- Hanja: 潘; 班
- RR: Ban
- MR: Pan

Ban, also spelled Bahn or Pan, is a Korean family name.

== Overview ==
The family name Ban is written with either of two hanja, indicating different lineages. The 2000 South Korean census found a total of 26,171 people and 8,143 households with these family names. In a study by the National Institute of the Korean Language based on 2007 application data for South Korean passports, it was found that 93.8% of people with this family name spelled it in Latin letters as Ban in their passports, while 4% spelled it Van. Rarer alternative spellings (the remaining 2.2%) included Bahn.

=== More common (潘) ===
Tteumul Ban (뜨물 반; 潘; lit. '"leftover water from washing rice"') is the more common of the two Ban family names. This character was originally used to write the Chinese family name pronounced Pān in Mandarin. The 2000 South Korean census found 23,216 people with this family name, and 7,224 households. The surviving bongwan at that time included:

1. Geoje (see Geoje Ban clan): 10,063 people and 3,152 households. They claim descent from Ban Bu (반부; 潘阜; Pinyin: Pān Fù) of China, who is said to have come to Korea when China was ruled by the Southern Song dynasty.
2. Gwangju: 6,660 people and 2,031 households. They are a branch of the Geoje Ban clan. They claim descent from Ban Chung (반충; 潘忠), a sixth-generation descendant of Ban Bu who served under Taejo of Joseon.
3. Giseong: 3,194 people and 1,039 households. They are another branch of the Geoje Ban clan; Giseong was an old placename on Geoje Island. A relatively large concentration had lived in a clan village in Gura-ri, Iseo-myeon, Cheongdo-gun, Gyeongsangbuk-do, believed to have been established by Ban Ye (반예; 潘汭) in the mid-1500s. As late as the 1970s, about 80 households with this family name lived there, but by 2012 that had declined to around 50.
4. Nampyeong: 2,227 people and 676 households. They are a sub-branch of the Giseong Ban clan. They claim descent from Ban Yu-hyeon (반유현; 潘有賢), an official under Gongmin of Goryeo, and through him descent from the Geoje Ban clan's ancestor Ban Bu.
5. Gyeolseong: 441 people and 133 households.
6. Eumseong: 408 people and 108 households.
7. Other or unknown bongwan: 64 people and 16 households.

=== Less common (班) ===
Nanul Ban (나눌 반; 班; lit. '"group"') is the less common of the two Ban family names. This character was originally used to write the Chinese family name pronounced Bān in Mandarin. None of the surviving records clarify when the family name was adopted in Korea or whether the various clans using this character as their surname have a common ancestor. The 2000 South Korean census found 2,955 people with this family name, and 919 households. The surviving bongwan (origin of a clan lineage, not necessarily the actual residence of the clan members) at that time included:

1. Gwangju: 1,492 people and 451 households.
2. Kaesong (Gaeseong): 685 people and 215 households. Between the 1985 census and the 2000 census, it was the only major Ban (班) clan for which the number of members shrank (from 1,028 people), while all the other major Ban clans saw their population multiply by anywhere from six to eighty times. One author suggests that some members of the Kaesong Ban clan had re-identified as belonging to other bongwan in the 2000 census. It is the only surviving Ban clan in South Korea whose bongwan is located in what is now North Korean territory.
3. Pyeonghae: 401 people and 133 households. It was one of the two Ban clans which showed massive increases in population numbers between the 1985 and 2000 censuses: in the former, it was recorded as having just nine members.
4. Goseong: 345 people and 113 households. It had just four members in the 1985 census.
5. Other or unknown bongwan: 32 people and 7 households.

== People ==
People with this family name include:

- Ban Hyo-jin (born 2007), South Korean sport shooter, Olympic gold medalist
- Ban Hyo-jung (born 1942), South Korean actress
- Ban Ki-moon (born 1944), South Korean statesman and politician
- Ban Se-jung (born Kim Se-jung, 1986), South Korean actress

Fictional characters with this family name include:

- Ban Geum-ryeon, the titular character of Kim Ki-young's 1982 film Ban Geum-ryeon
