= Ban, Kubu, Karangasem =

Coordinates: 8°14′S 115°29′E

Ban
- Village
- Interactive map of Ban
- Country: Indonesia
- Province: Bali
- Regency: Karangasem
- Districts: Kubu

Government
  - Village Leader: I Gede Tamu Sugiantara

Population (2015)
  - Total: 11,858
- Time zone: UTC+8:00 (WITA)
- Postal code: 80853

Ban (alternately Desa Ban) is a village in Kubu District, Karangasem Regency, Bali, Indonesia.

== History ==
In 2015, its population was measured at 11,858 people. A 2018 earthquake destroyed the homes of many villagers, forcing them to live in tents.

== Geography ==
Ban has a number of smaller villages (sometimes called hamlets) contained within it. Two mountains, Mt. Abang and Mt. Agung, are close by, and until the turn of the 21st century, the entire village had one dirt road for transportation. A village project to make nine cement roads was expected to be completed by the end of the 2019 calendar year. Areas on the outskirts of the village have been targeted by outside relief agencies as a spot for bamboo reforestation.

== Culture ==
A local market, open once every three days, serves as a commerce center for the surrounding area. The local people speak Bahasa and Balinese.
