= Y Ban =

Vietnamese writer, poet, journalist

Phạm Thị Xuân Ban (born 1 July 1961, writing as Y Ban) is a Vietnamese writer of short stories, poet and journalist. She published her poetry on her Facebook timeline. Her books I am Woman, 2006 (I am Đàn bà), Hey, have you really seen anything?, 2011 (Này hỏi thật đã thấy gì chưa đấy?) were put on censorship ban in Vietnam.

== Early life and education ==
Ban was born 1 July 1961 in Nam Định, Vietnam. She graduated from the Vietnam National University, Hanoi in 1982, and in 1992 graduated from the Nguyễn Du School of Creative Writing.

== Writing career ==
Ban works as a reporter for Giao Duc va Thoi Dai (Education in our era).

Her first short story was published in the Armed Forces Literary Review in 1983.

She has published five collections of short stories, the first of which Người đàn bà có ma lực : truyện ngá̆n (The Female Exorcist) won second prize in a national writing competition in 1993. She has also had 70 stories published in anthologies.

She started to write in 1989 with two awards for her work "The Letter to Mother Au Co" ("Bức thư gửi Mẹ Âu Cơ") and "The Woman with Magic" ("Người đàn bà có ma lực") about Military Arts. She also worked at Department of Education and is a member of Writers Association.

== Censorship ==
Two of her books, I am Woman, 2006 (I am Đàn bà), Hey, have you really seen anything?, 2011 (Này hỏi thật đã thấy gì chưa đấy?), after publishing were put on censorship ban in Vietnam. Afterwards, Y Ban wrote a letter in 2013 denying the merit of the Vietnam Writers Association for the novel Game of destroying emotions (Trò chơi hủy diệt cảm xúc) and resigned from office of a Spokeswoman of Council of Vietnam Writers Association.

== Poetry ==
Y Ban says in her poetry, that she posted only on her Facebook page, about all the world, everyday matters, corruption, ecological crimes like Formosa plant's pollution of waters in Vietnam, or poverty, like in poem "Ritual before meals".

After winning International Poetry slam reading in Hanoi, that was organized by French Embassy, she traveled in May 2017 in France to voice her woman's say, that sometimes restricted in Vietnam by a taboo.

== Selected publications ==
- Ban, Y (1998). Truyện ngá̆n Y Ban chọn lọc [Y Ban's Selectd Stories]. Hanoi: Văn học.
- Ban, Y (2003). Người đàn bà có ma lực : truyện ngá̆n [The Female Exorcist]. Hanoi: Nhà xuá̂t bản Thanh niên.
