= Ban, Murree =

Ban
- Union Council
- Country: Pakistan
- Province: Punjab
- District: Murree
- Tehsil: Murree

Population
  - Total: 6,514

Ban is a village and union council of Murree Tehsil in the Murree District of Punjab, Pakistan. It is located in the south of the tehsil, and is bounded to the north by Mussiari, to the north-east by Charhan, to the east by Angoori and to the south by Kotli Sattian.

According to the 1998 census of Pakistan it had a population of 11,414.
