= Banning High School =

Banning High School can refer to:

- Phineas Banning High School in Wilmington, Los Angeles, California
- Banning High School (Banning, California) in Banning, California
