= Jan Banning =

Dutch photographer and artist

Jan Banning (born 4 May 1954, Almelo) is a Dutch photographer and artist.

Banning was born in the Netherlands from Dutch-East-Indies parents. He studied social and economic history at the Radboud University Nijmegen, and has been working as a photographer since 1981. A central theme of Banning's practice is state power, having produced series about the long-term consequences of war and the world of government bureaucracy.

His Dutch East Indies roots are expressed in his choice of subjects, such as Indonesian women who were forced to become prostitutes for the Japanese army during the Second World War in Comfort Women; or former forced labourers in South East Asia during the same period in Traces of War: Survivors of the Burma and Sumatra Railways; also the repatriation of elderly Moluccans from the Netherlands to the Indonesian Moluccas in Pulang: Back to Maluku. His study of history is reflected in the historical components of his subject matters and his academic education is expressed in his aim to achieve sound intellectual foundations for his projects on the basis of a thorough preliminary investigation.

== Selected books ==
- Banning, Jan. Viet Nam: Doi Mo’i. Amsterdam: FOCUS, 1993. ISBN 90-72216-38-5.
- Banning, Jan, Burma behind the Mask, photo/text book with authors Jan Donkers and Minka Nijhuis, preface by Aung San Suu Kyi, Amsterdam: BCN 1996. ISBN 90-802-999-2-8
- Banning, Jan, Pulang. Terug naar Maluku, Amsterdam: Focus, ISBN 90-72216-76-8. A photo book about a Moluccan couple returning to Indonesia after 45 years in the Netherlands, with an introduction by Matt Dings.
- Banning, Jan, Sporen van oorlog. Overlevenden van de Birma- en de Pakanbaroe-spoorweg, with a personal impression by Wim Willems, Utrecht: Ipso Facto. ISBN 90-77386-01-7. A publication of photographs and interviews between Banning and 24 Dutch and Indonesian men including the photographer's father who were forced to build railroads for the Japanese during World War II.
- Banning, Jan. Traces of War: Survivors of the Burma and Sumatra Railways. London: Trolley, 2005. ISBN 1-904563-46-5. English version of "Sporen van oorlog. Overlevenden van de Birma- en de Pakanbaroe-spoorweg."
- Banning, Jan and Dick Wittenberg, Binnen is het donker, buiten is het licht, Amsterdam: Atlas. ISBN 978-90-450-1466-1. Photo/text book about a hamlet in Malawi.
- Banning, Jan, and Will Tinnemans. Bureaucratics. Portland, OR: Nazraeli Press, 2008. ISBN 978-1-59005-232-7.
- Banning, Jan. Bouwwerk: Mensen maken het museum (Construction Work: People Make the Museum). Amsterdam: Rijksmuseum, 2009. ISBN 978-90-71450-29-7.
- Banning, Jan, and Hilde Janssen, Comfort Women/Troostmeisjes, Utrecht (Netherlands): Ipso Facto/Lüdenscheid, Germany: Seltmann+Söhne, 2010. ISBN 978-90-77386-07-1.
- Banning, Jan, Down and Out in the South, Utrecht (Netherlands): Ipso Facto, 2013, ISBN 978-90-77386-09-5. A book with 42 studio portraits of homeless people in the US South (Georgia, Mississippi and South Carolina) with an introduction by the Atlanta-based writer James Swift.
- Banning, Jan, Law & Order. The world of criminal justice. Utrecht (Netherlands): Ipso Facto, 2015 ISBN 978-90-77386-15-6. A photo and text book comparing criminal justice in four countries (Colombia, France, Uganda and the USA).
- Jan Banning: Red Utopia. Utrecht, Ipso Facto, 2017. ISBN 978-1-59005-467-3
- Jan Banning, Dick Wittenberg, Marjan Slob: Bloedbanden. Verzoening na de genocide in Rwanda. Eindhoven, Lecturis, 2025. ISBN 9789462265509
