= Budakeling =

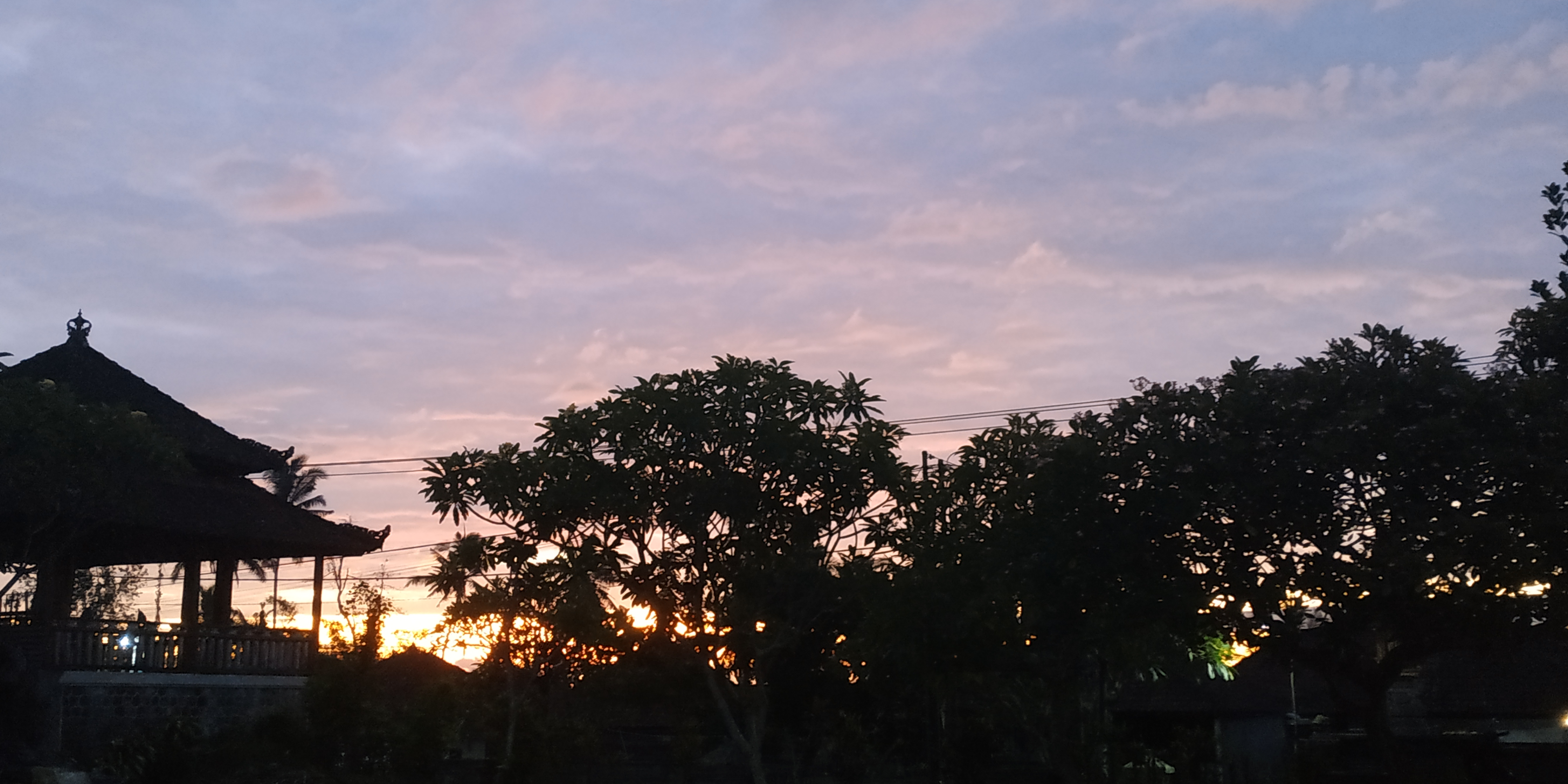
- Sunrise at Budakeling

- Location in Bali
- Coordinates: 8°25′42.5309″S 115°34′17.2031″E
- Country: Indonesia
- Province: Bali
- Regency: Karangasem

Government
  - Village Chief (Perbekel): I Made Duarsana

Area
  - Total: 993 km^{2} (383 sq mi)
- Elevation: 906 m (2,972 ft)

Population
  - Total: 3,784
  - Density: 3.81/km^{2} (9.87/sq mi)
- Postal code: 80861
- Website: http://www.budakeling.desa.id

Budakeling (Indonesian pronunciation: [budakəˈliŋ]) or Bude Keling is a village located in Bebandem District in Bali, Indonesia. The village is 617 mile (993 km) long. The postal code of Budakeling is 80861.

== History ==
It was founded by Danghyang Astapaka in 1416 Çaka or 1494 AD.

== Administration ==
Official Administration, Budakeling is divided into 8 Banjar:

1. Official Banjar Triwangsa
2. Official Banjar Budakeling
3. Official Banjar Saren Kauh
4. Official Banjar Saren Kangin
5. Official Banjar Saren Anyar
6. Official Banjar Dukuh
7. Official Banjar Pesawan
8. Official Banjar Saren Jawa

By Adat, Budakeling Village is split into two Desa Pakraman and one Kampung:

Desa Pakraman Budakeling

- Banjar Gede Jina Murti.
- Banjar Tilem.
- Banjar Pande Mas.
- Banjar Pande Besi.

Desa Pakraman Saren

- Banjar Saren Kauh
- Banjar Saren Kangin
- Banjar Saren Anyar
- Banjar Dukuh
- Banjar Pesawan

Kampung Saren Jawa

== Tourism ==
Budakeling is home to a Shiva-Buddhist community, dating from at least the 15th century and is home to many artisans. These are some tourist spots you can reach at Budakeling village:

- Traditional gold and silver smith
- Traditional iron smith
- Sunrise view at hill
- Terraces rice paddy
- Ngusaba Dalem at Pura Dalem Budakeling and Pura Dalem Saren (can see many traditional dance)
- Ter-teran or Terteran rites

== Gallery ==
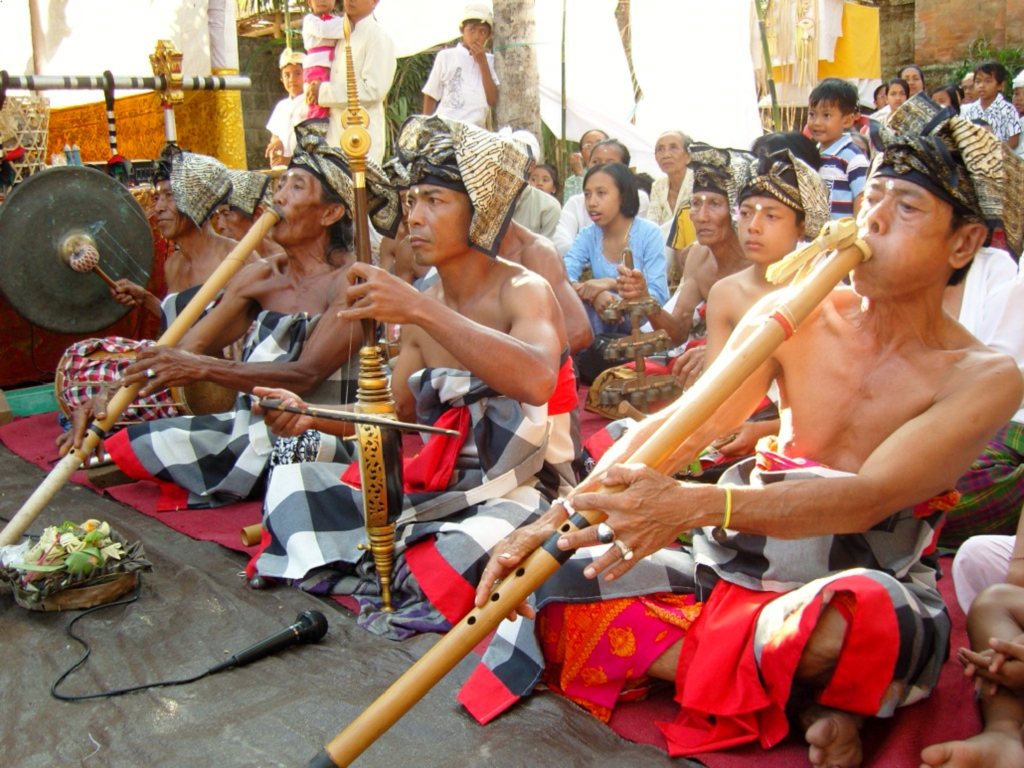
Gambelan for Gambuh Dance

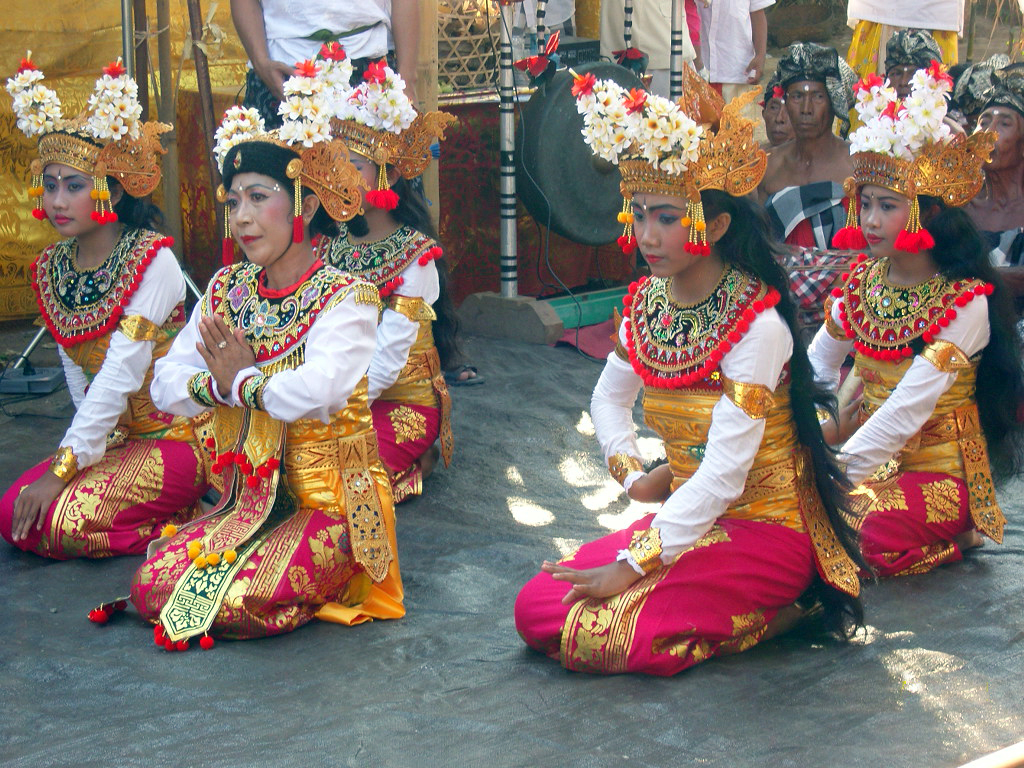
Gambuh Dance by Budakeling Artist
