= Ban (Chinese surname) =

Ban (班)
- Pronunciation: Ban (Mandarin)
- Language: Chinese

Origin
- Language: Old Chinese
- Meaning: Stripes (of a tiger)

Other names
- Variant form: Pan

Ban is the Mandarin pinyin romanization of the Chinese surname written 班 in Chinese character. It is romanized "Pan" in Wade–Giles. Ban is listed 235th in the Song dynasty classic text Hundred Family Surnames. It is not among the 300 most common surnames in China. In 2013 it was the 269th most common surname shared by 273,000 people, comprising 0.021% of the total population and the provincial level unit with the most people having the name being Guangxi.

== Origin ==
The surname Ban originated from Mi 芈, the royal surname of the State of Chu of ancient China. Dou Gouwutu (鬬穀於菟; fl. 7th century BC), a grandson of the Chu ruler Ruo'ao, was said to have been abandoned as an infant and nursed by a tigress. His given name Gouwutu, meant nursed (穀 gòu, milk) by a tiger (於菟 wūtú, tiger) in the Chu language. Dou Gouwutu grew up to become a general and the Prime Minister of Chu. His descendants adopted Ban (meaning "stripes", an allusion to tiger's stripes) as their surname.

== Notable people ==
- Consort Ban (c. 48 BC – 6 BC), scholar, poet, and consort of Emperor Cheng of Han
- Ban Biao (3–54), Han dynasty historian, nephew of Consort Ban
- Ban Gu (32–92), historian and son of Ban Biao, main author of the Book of Han
- Ban Chao (32–102), general, explorer, and diplomat, son of Ban Biao
- Ban Zhao (45 – c. 116), the first female Chinese historian, daughter of Ban Biao
- Ban Yong (died c. 128), Eastern Han general and governor of the Western Regions, son of Ban Chao
- Ban Yong (班勇; born 1989), professional football player
- Ban Jiajia (班嘉佳), Bouyei actress and model

== See also ==
- Ban (disambiguation)#People
