= Banned (disambiguation) =

In law, banned is a state resulting from a legal prohibition.

Banned or The Banned may also refer to:

- Banned (EP), an album by UGK
- Banned, a horse in Jefferson Cup Stakes
- The Banned, New Wave band
- The Banned (EastEnders), fictional band
