= Warmadewa University =

Private university in Indonesia

- Universitas Warmadewa ᬉᬦᬶᬯ᬴ᬾᬃᬲᬶᬢᬲ᭄ᬯᬃᬫᬤᭂᬯ
- Latin: Universitas Warmadewa
- Motto: Guna Widya Sewaka Nagara (Balinese)
- Motto in English: Science, Technology, Art
- Type: Private university
- Established: 17 July 1984
- Founder: Yayasan KORPRI Bali
- Accreditation: BAN-PT: UNGGUL / EXCELLENT (2024–2029)
- Rector: Prof. Dr. Ir. I Gde Suranaya Pandit, M.P.
- Faculty: 442 ( 2024/2025)
- Students: 19158 (2023)
- Location: Jl. Terompong No.24, Sumerta Kelod, Kec. Denpasar Tim., Kota Denpasar, Bali 80239, Denpasar, Bali, Indonesia; 8.659306°S 115.243111°E
- Campus: Urban
- Nickname: Unwar
- Mascot: Sri Kesari Warmadewa
- Website: www.warmadewa.ac.id
- Location in Denpasar

Warmadewa University (Indonesian: Universitas Warmadewa; Balinese: ᬉᬦᬶᬯ᬴ᬾᬃᬲᬶᬢᬲ᭄ᬯᬃᬫᬤᭂᬯ, abbreviated as Unwar), is a private university in Denpasar, Bali, Indonesia established on 17 July 1984. It has 6 faculties. The name was proposed by the Governor of Bali, Ida Bagus Mantra to honor a former king of Bali, Sri Kesari Warmadewa.

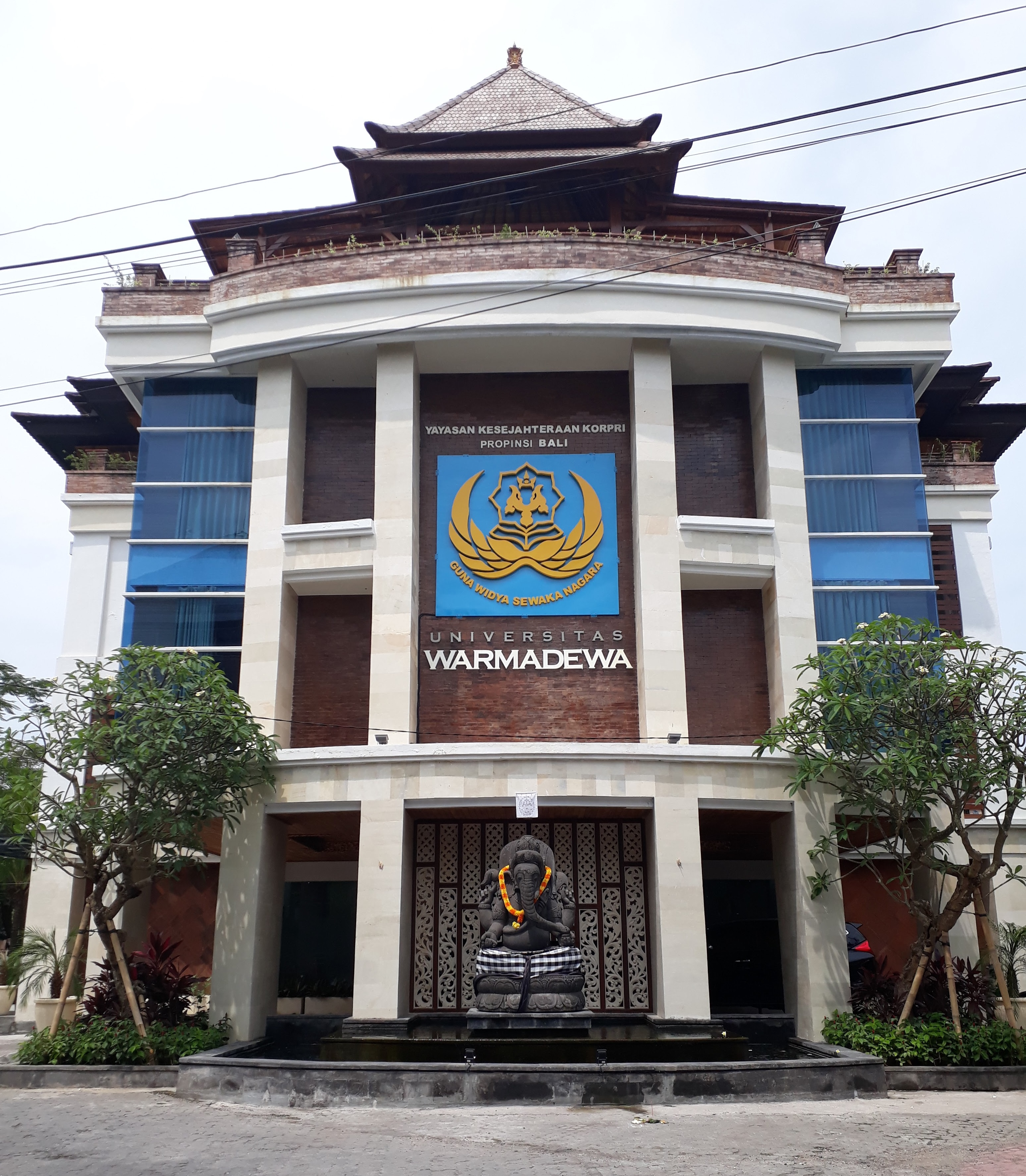
Warmadewa University main campus

== History ==
On November 12, 1983, at the Korpri Bali Regional Working Meeting in Kertasabha Denpasar, the Head of the Korpri Unit of Udayana University, Prof. Drs. Putu Kuna Winaya proposed the establishment of Korpri University, with the basic principle of "affordable education costs and guaranteed quality" which was developed into "quality, integrity and environmental awareness". The proposal to establish this university was intended as an effort to accommodate the aspirations of the community that had not been accommodated in State Universities. After receiving permission from the Korpri Center, the Head of the Korpri Bali Management (Drs. Sembah Subhakti) and the Head of the Korpri Unit of Udayana University (Prof. Drs. Putu Kuna Winaya) agreed to establish Korpri University.

In June 1984, a proposal was prepared to establish Korpri University by involving elements of Korpri Udayana University and Korpri Regional Government, while also establishing the Founding Board consisting of Drs. Sembah Subhakti, Prof. Drs. Putu Kuna Winaya, I Ketut Widjana, SH, and I Wayan Waya, SH.

On July 17, 1984, Warmadewa University was officially established and the foundation's management was determined at the Bali Korpri Meeting on July 30, 1984. After the completeness of the Foundation's Bodies was formed, it was then reported to Kopertis Region VIII, that Korpri University had been established with the name Warmadewa University. The name Warmadewa University was given by the Governor of Bali at that time, Prof. Dr. Ida Bagus Mantra, as a form of appreciation for the Balinese king of the pre-Majapahit era from the Warmadewa Dynasty. On August 15, 1984, Prof. dr. I Gusti Agung Gde Puthra was appointed as the First Chancellor of Warmadewa University. The first lecture was held in the yard of the Unud Campus on September 17, 1984, which until now is commemorated as the birthday of Warmadewa University.

According to the Decree of the Bali Province Korpri Welfare Foundation No. 05/ Yas.Korp/VII/84, Warmadewa University consists of 6 (six) faculties and 1 (one) non-degree education, including;

1. Faculty of Economics
2. Faculty of Law
3. Faculty of Literature
4. Faculty of Social Sciences and Political Science
5. Faculty of Agriculture
6. Faculty of Engineering
7. Faculty of Teacher Training and Education.

In further developments, the Coordinator of Kopertis Region VIII gave approval for the opening of faculty/department/study program units within Warmadewa University and granted operational permits to 18 Study Programs under its supervision with letter No. 187/Kop.VIII/B/02/1985 dated November 10, 1985.

Since November 25, 1986, in accordance with the Decree of the Minister of Education and Culture of the Republic of Indonesia No. 0825/0/1986, Unwar has been designated in Registered Status for the 6 (six) faculties and finally based on the Decree of the Minister of Education and Culture of the Republic of Indonesia No. 455/0/1991 dated August 8, 1991, No. 0641/0/1991 dated December 13, 1992 and the Decree of the Director General of Higher Education No. 81/Kep/1992 dated April 2, 1992 all Faculties/Departments/Study Programs within the University of Warmadewa have the status of "Recognized".

Currently, Warmadewa University with the motto: "Guna Widya Sewaka Nagara" has 14 Undergraduate Study Programs (S1) and 3 Postgraduate Programs (S2), namely: Master of Management, Master of Law, and Master of Linguistics which have Operational Permits. Meanwhile, the Bachelor of Psychology Study Program, Master of Government Science (MIP), and Master of Public Administration (MAP) are in the process of being proposed to the Directorate General of Higher Education, Ministry of Education and Culture of the Republic of Indonesia.

=== Faculty of Medicine ===
Since the year 2009, the Faculty of Medicine, Warmadewa University (FKIK Unwar) held medical education with the permission of the Minister of National Education No. 63/D/T/2009 dated January 20, 2009. The Minister of Education and Culture with Decree No. 305/E/O/2013 dated July 23, 2013 granted permission to FKIK Unwar to hold undergraduate education programs (S1) and doctor profession programs. Accredited by LAM-PTKes with a B (Good) rating for the undergraduate stage (S1) Decree No. 0411/LAM-PTKes/Akr/Sar/VII/2017 and B (Good) for the doctor process stage Decree No. 0412/LAM-PTKes/Akr/Pro/VII/2017.

In the development process, the Faculty of Medicine successfully obtained a competitive grant organized by the Directorate General of Higher Education with a budget from the World Bank IBRD Loan No. 7737-ID in 2011–2014 amounting to 13 billion rupiah. The implementation of the grant successfully obtained a Good Performance Report (96%) and in a partnership scheme with the Faculty of Medicine Udayana University, Denpasar and the Faculty of Medicine Mataram University, Mataram received the Best Certificate. Professional medical education, according to the provisions, graduates are required to take the National Medical Professional Education Student Competency Test (UKMPPD). Passing the first exam (first taker) is a benchmark for institutional development. The percentage of FKIK Unwar's first taker graduation is 81% (above the national average).

=== Faculty of Engineering ===
The Faculty of Engineering is one of the seven faculties that have existed since the founding of Warmadewa University in accordance with the Decree. of the Bali Province Korpri Welfare Foundation No. 05/Yas.Korp/VII/84. Operational permit from Kopertis Region VIII gave approval for study programs in the Faculty of Engineering through letter No. 187/Kop.VIII/B/02/1985 dated November 10, 1985. Since November 25, 1986, in accordance with the Decree of the Minister of Education and Culture of the Republic of Indonesia No. 0825/0/1986, the status of Registered has been determined for the Faculty of Engineering and finally based on the Decree of the Minister of Education and Culture of the Republic of Indonesia No. 455/0/1991 dated August 8, 1991, No. 0641/0/1991 dated December 13, 1992 and the Decree of the Director General of Higher Education No. 81/Kep/1992 dated April 2, 1992 all Faculties within the University of Warmadewa have the status of "Recognized". The Decree of the Directorate General of Higher Education for the Operational Permit for the Architecture Study Program is Decree No. 2397/D/T/K-VIII/2009 dated June 1, 2009 and for the Civil Engineering Study Program is SK. No. 2396/D/T/K-VIII/2009 dated June 1, 2009.

== Faculty ==
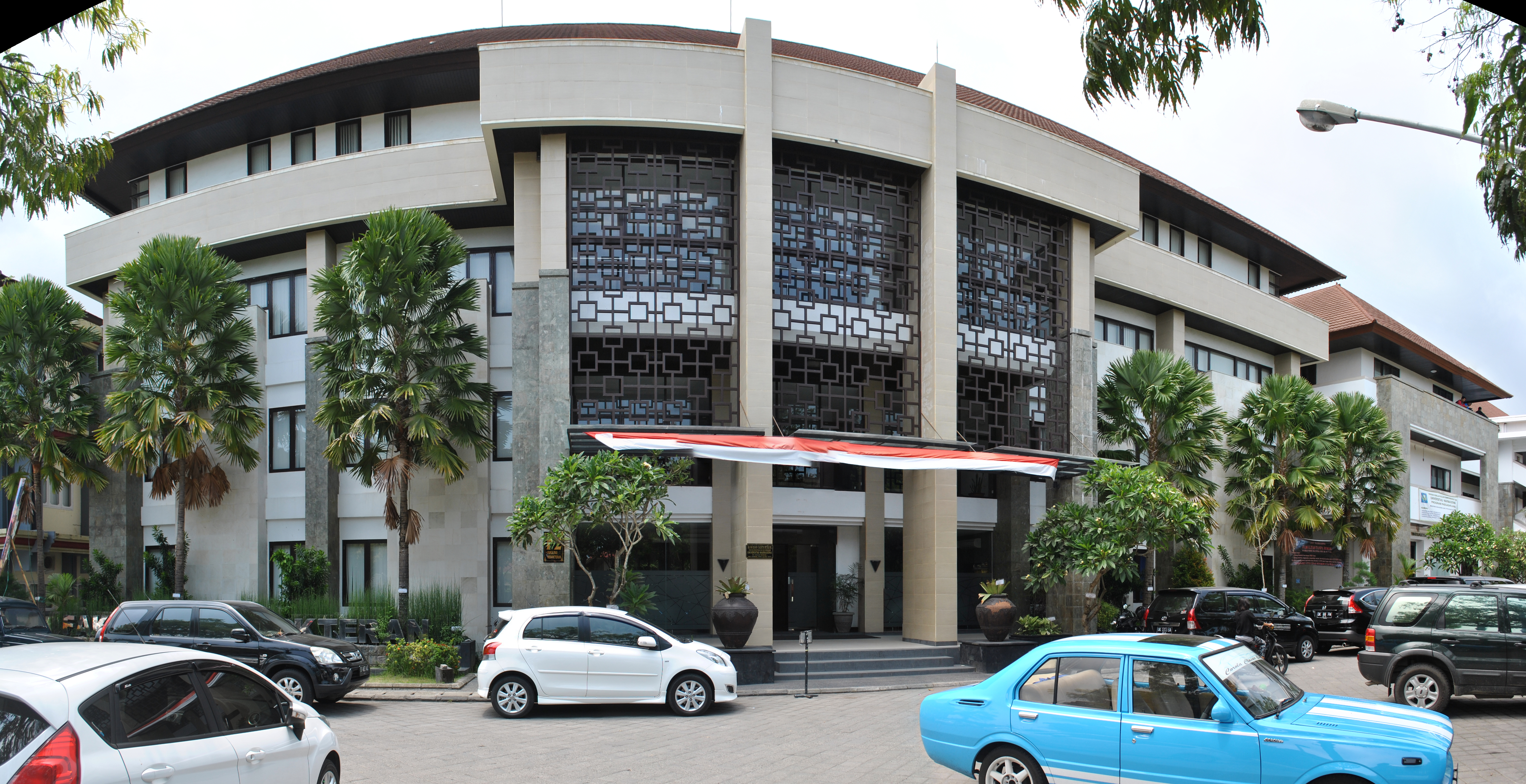
One of the campus building of Warmadewa University

=== Faculty of Economics ===
The Faculty of Economics of Warmadewa University is led by a dean with three assistant deans:

Dean: Drs. Wayan Gede Merta, M.Sc.

Assistant Dean:
1. Ni Nyoman Rusmiati, S.E., M.M.
2. Gusti Ayu Sugiati, S.E.
3. Ida Bagus Komang Suarka, S.E.

The Faculty of Economics has three departments/study programs:

- Department of Economics and Development Studies
- Department of Management
- Department of Accounting

=== Faculty of Law (FH) ===
The Law Study Program of the Faculty of Law, Warmadewa University has the status of Accredited Excellent based on the Decree of the National Accreditation Board for Higher Education (BAN-PT) of the Ministry of National Education of the Republic of Indonesia No.5842/SK/BAN-PT/Ak.Ppj/S/IX/2024 concerning the Accreditation Results of the Law Study Program of the Faculty of Law, Warmadewa University.

=== Faculty of Social and Political Sciences (FISIP) ===
The Faculty of FISIP has 2 departments/study programs:

- Department of Government Science
- Department of State Administration

=== Faculty of Medicine and Health Sciences ===
The Faculty of Medicine and Health Sciences has 1 department/study program:

- Department of Medical Education/Doctoral Profession

=== Faculty of Agriculture (FP) ===
The Faculty of Agriculture has 2 departments/study programs:

- Department of Agricultural Cultivation
- Department of Agricultural Technology
- Department of Animal Husbandry
- Department of Fisheries

=== Faculty of Letters ===
Dean: Prof. Dr. I Nyoman Kardana, M.Hum. The Faculty of Letters has 1 department/study program:

- Department of English Literature

=== Faculty of Engineering ===
The Faculty of Engineering, Warmadewa University, is led by a dean with three assistant deans.

Dean: Prof. Dr. Ir. I Wayan Runa, MT.

Vice Dean:
1. Dr. Ir. I Gusti Agung Putu Eryani, MT.
2. Dewa Ayu Nyoman Sri Astuti, ST. MT.
3. Agus Kurniawan, ST. MT.

The Faculty of Engineering has 2 departments/study programs:

- Architecture Department
- Civil Engineering Department

== Partner Institution ==
=== Malaysia ===
- Universiti Tunku Abdul Rahman
- Universiti Putra Malaysia

=== Vietnam ===
- National Economic University Hanoi

=== India ===
- Rajshree Institute of Management & Technology
