= Banning, Delaware =

- Unincorporated community
- Location within Delaware Location within the United States
- Coordinates: 38°48′22″N 75°30′59″W
- Country: United States
- State: Delaware
- County: Sussex
- Time zone: UTC-5 (Eastern (EST))
  - Summer (DST): UTC-4 (EDT)
- ZIP code: 19941
- Area code: 302

Banning, Delaware, USA was a stop in Cedar Creek Hundred on the now defunct Queen Anne's Railroad line between Ellendale and Greenwood positioned at the NE corner of what now is Road 44/Blacksmith Shop Road and Delaware Route 16/Beach Highway. After the railroad closed down and the tracks were removed, all Banning, Delaware property owned by the railroad was returned to Mark L. Banning, its previous landowner. A small town built around the Banning, Delaware stop disappeared.
