= HMS Bann =

Three ships of the Royal Navy have been named HMS Bann:

- HMS Bann (1814) was a 20-gun sixth rate launched in 1814 and sold in 1829
- HMS Bann (1856) was an iron paddle gunboat launched in 1856 and sold in 1873
- HMS Bann (K256) was a River-class frigate launched in 1942 and transferred to the Royal Indian Navy as HMIS Tir in 1945. She was scrapped in 1979
