= Banning, Georgia =

Unincorporated community in Georgia, U.S.

Coordinates: 33°30′43″N 84°55′52″W

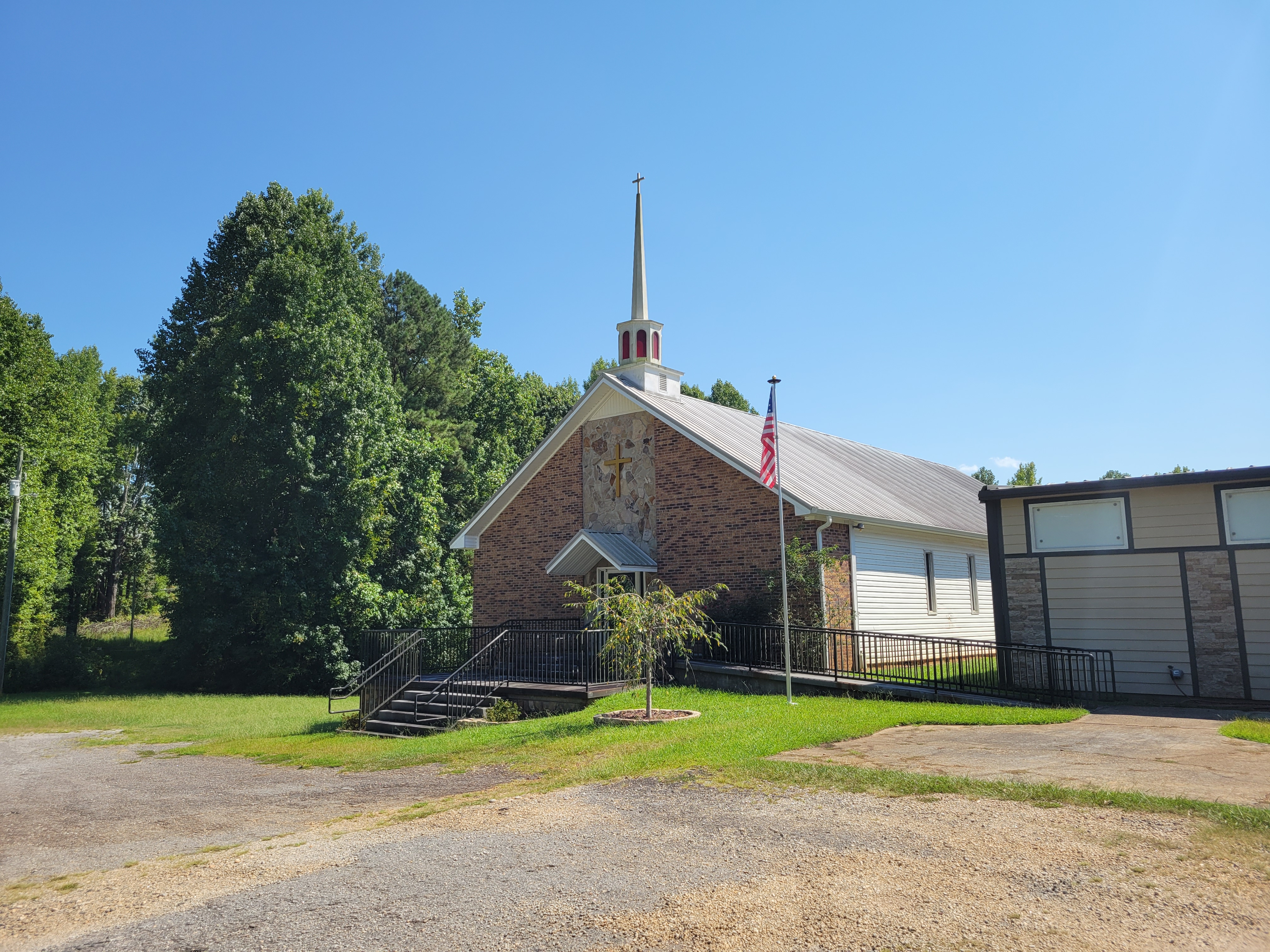
Banning Church of God

Banning is an unincorporated community in Carroll County, in the U.S. state of Georgia.

== History ==
A former variant name was "Bowenville". William Bowen was the first postmaster, and gave the community its original name. A post office called Banning was established in 1883, and remained in operation until 1942.
