= Karangasem Regency =

Regency in Bali, Indonesia

Karangasem Regency Kabupaten Karangasem
- Regency

Native transcription(s)
  - Balinese: ᬓᬪᬹᬧᬢᬾᬦ᭄ ᬓᬭᬗᬲᭂᬫ᭄ Kabupatén Karangasĕm
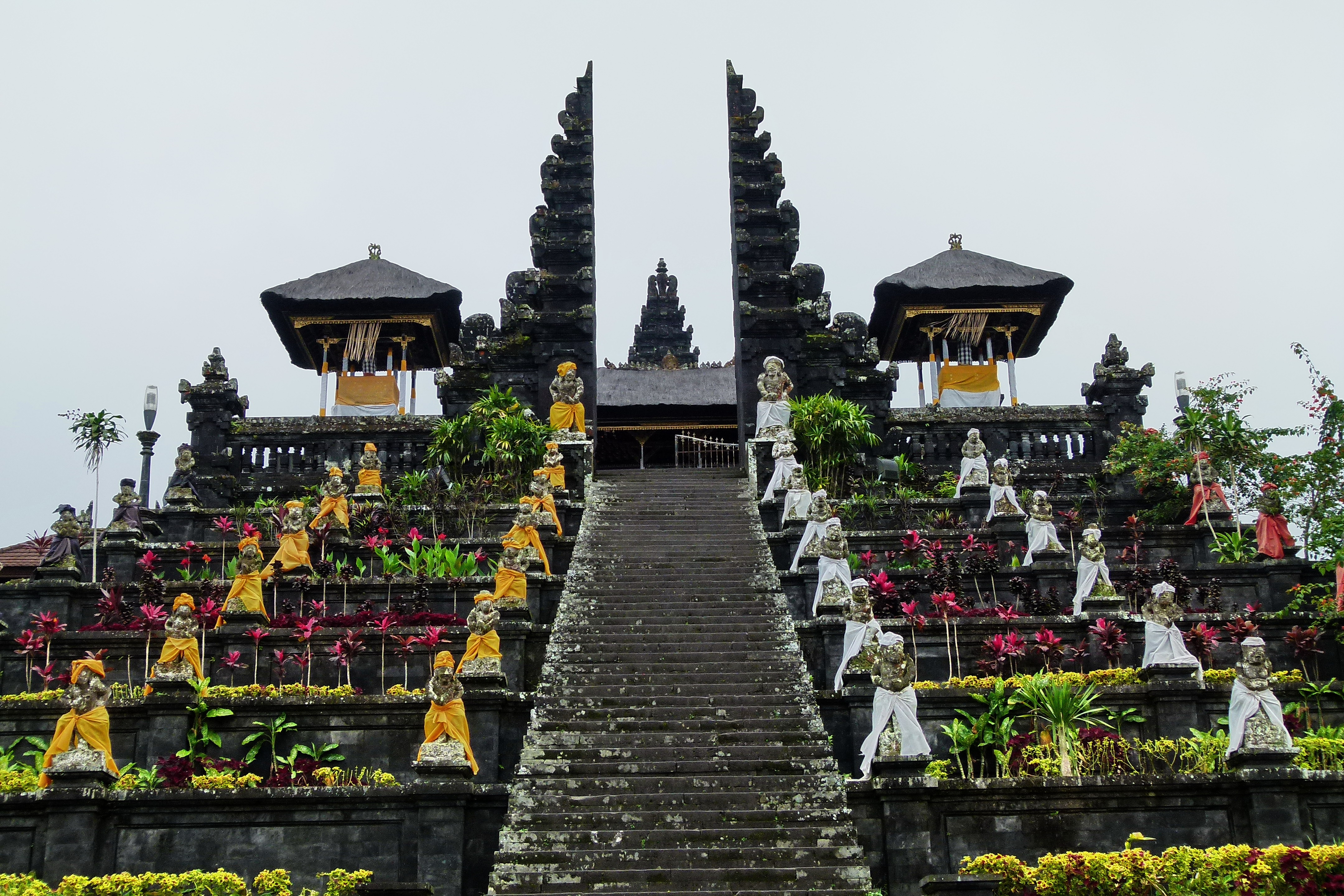
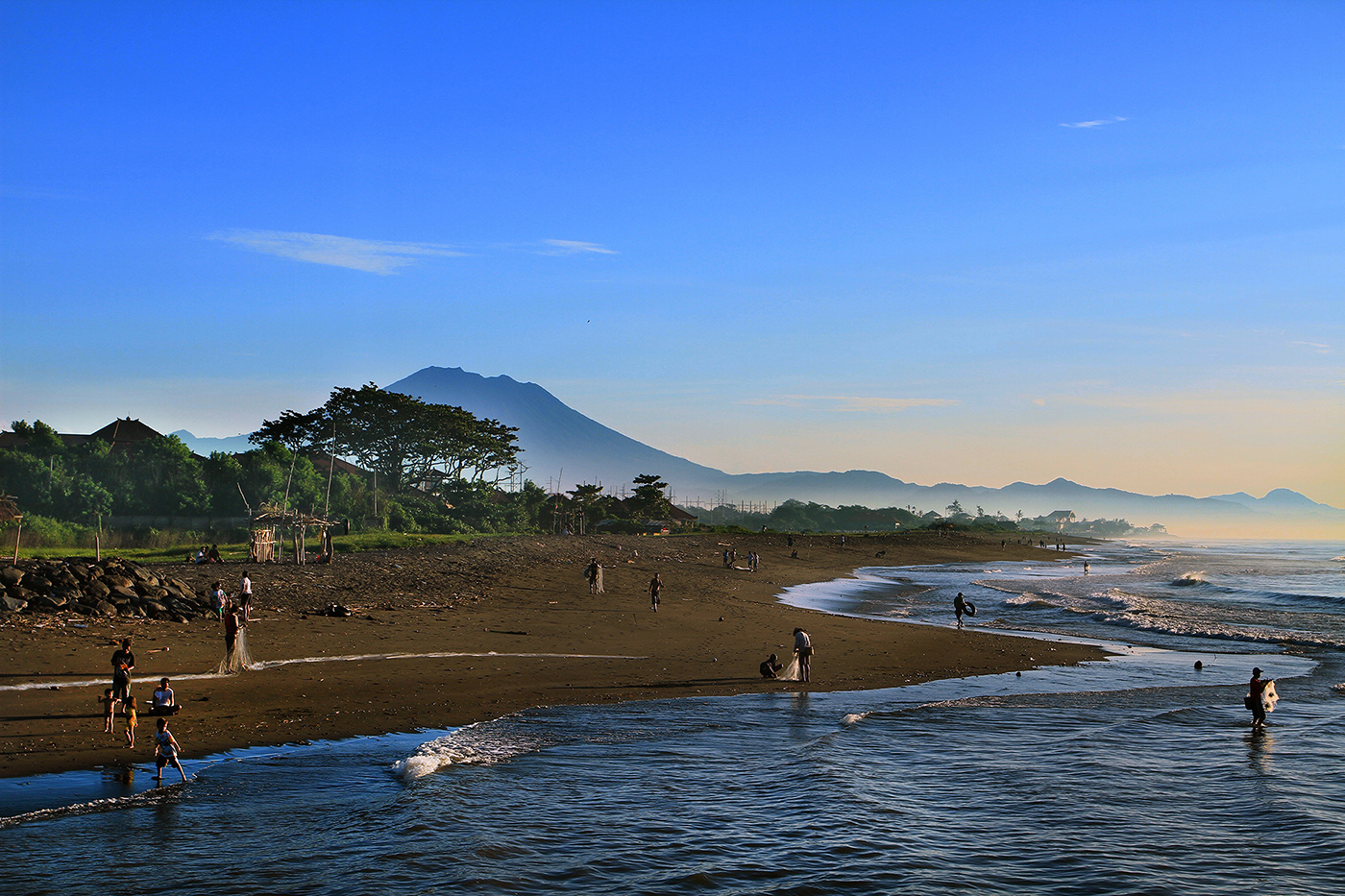
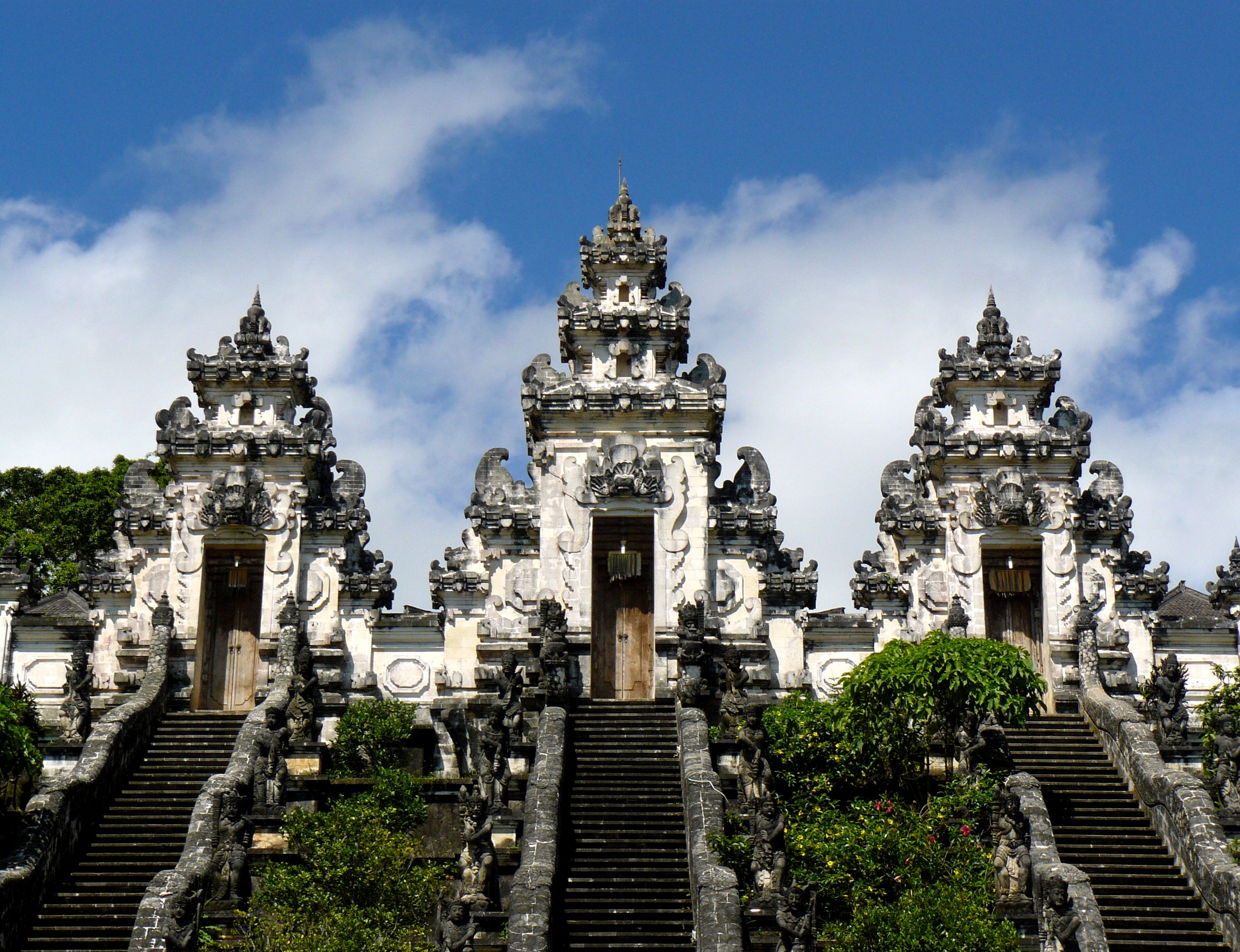
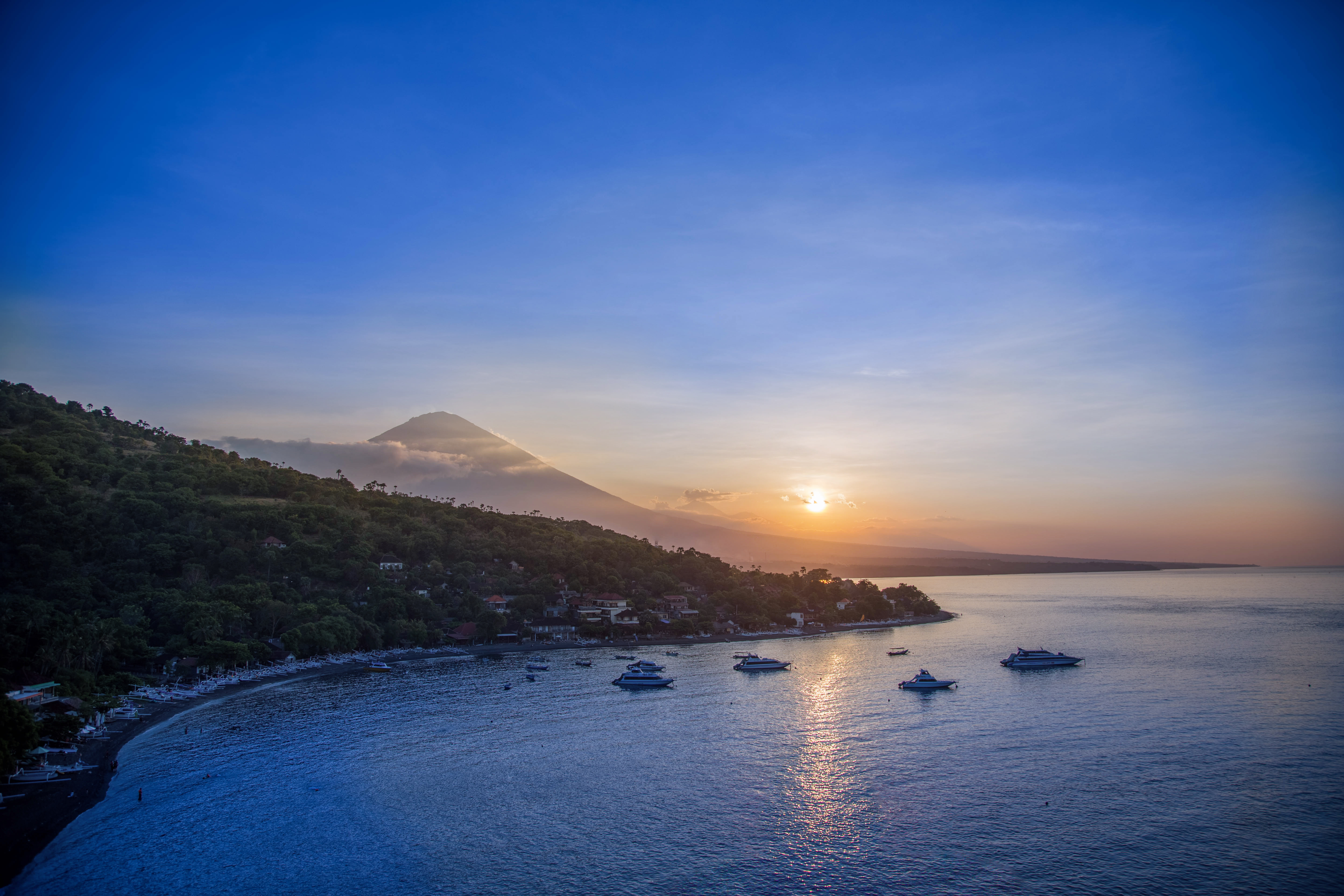
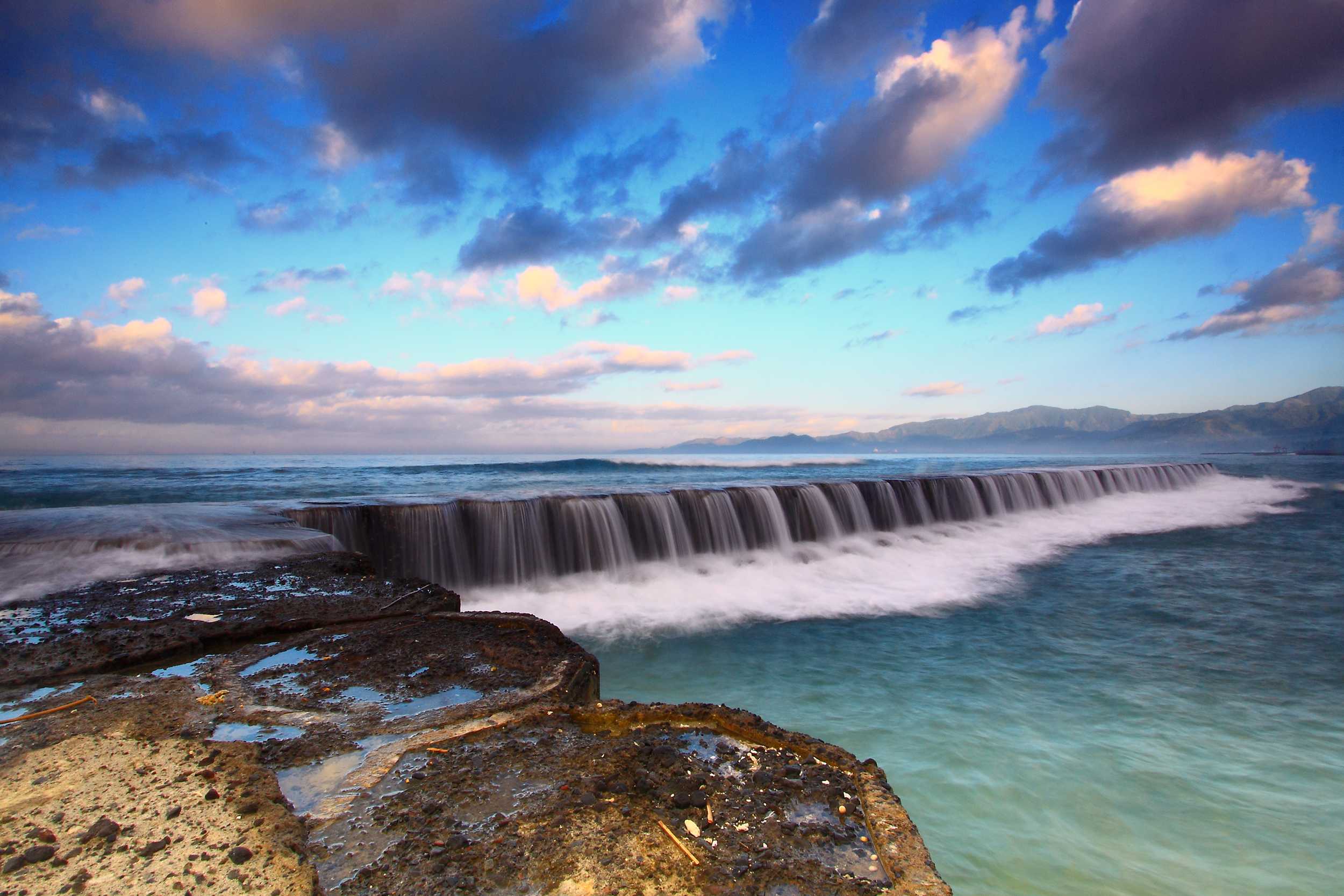
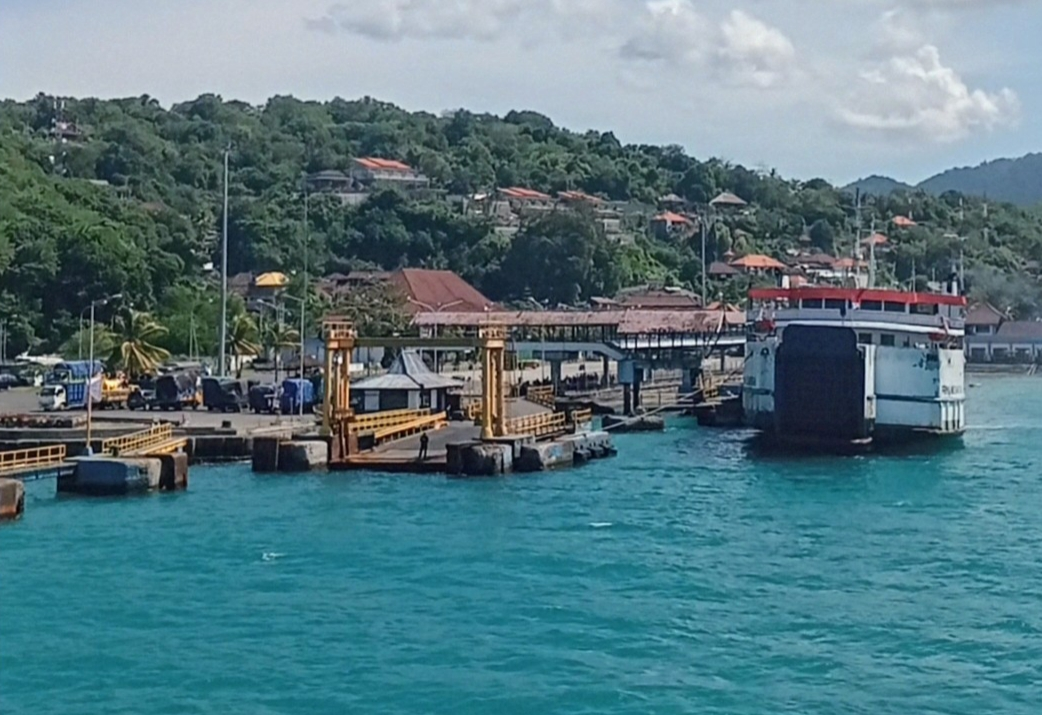
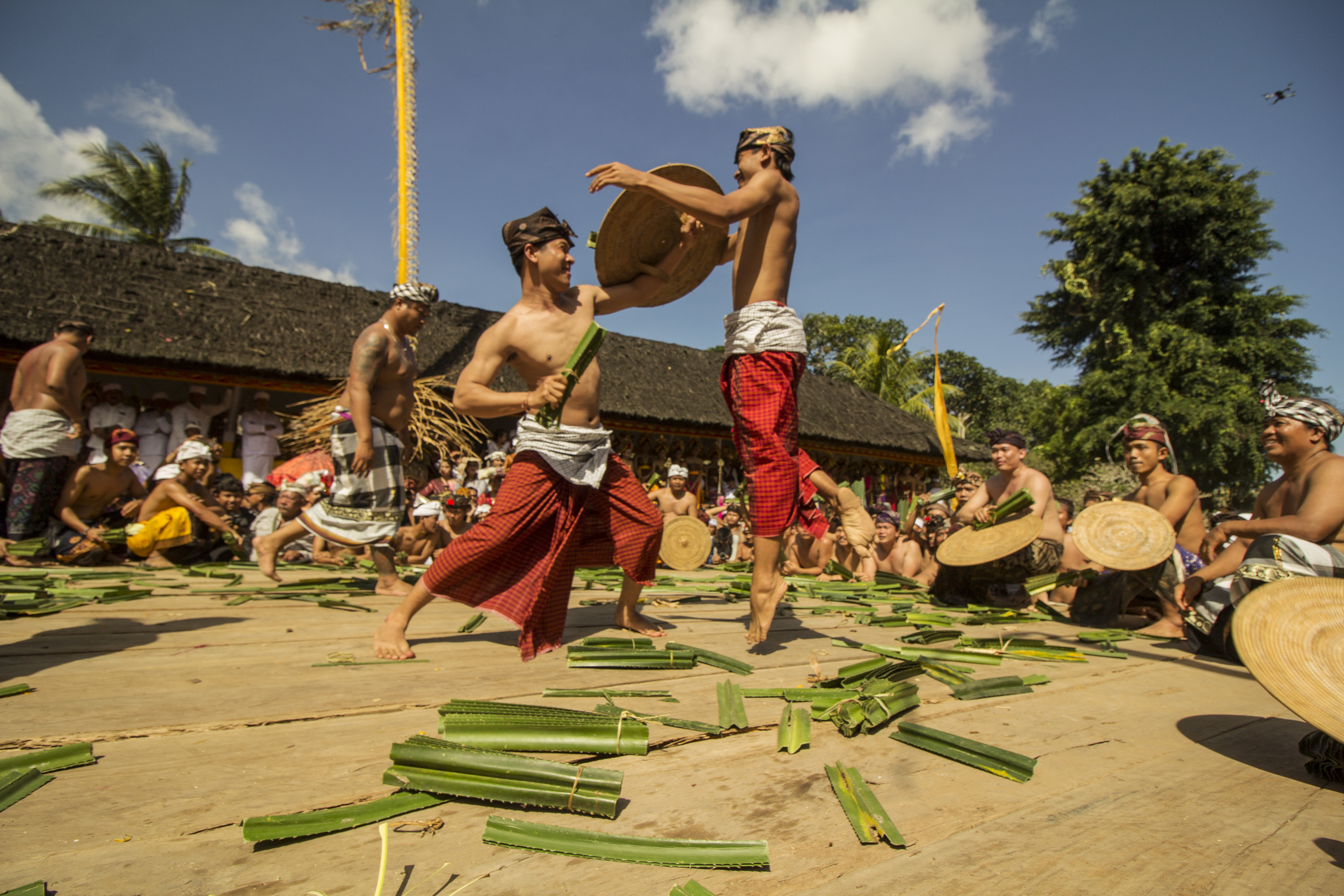
- Besakih Temple Mount Agung Penataran Agung Lempuyang Temple Amed Candidasa Padangbai Port The Pandan battle tradition in Tenganan

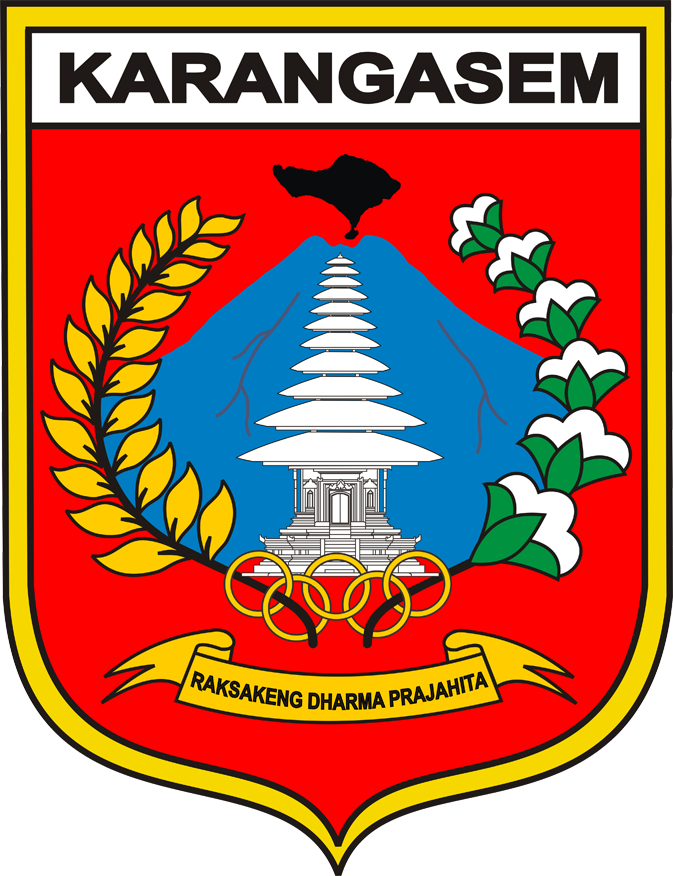
- Coat of arms
- Nicknames: Gumi Lahar ('Land of Lahar') · Gumi Megibung ('Land of Megibung') · Pearls from East Bali
- Motto(s): Raksakeng Dharma Prajahita (Sanskrit/Old Javanese) ᬭᬓ᭄ᬲᬓᬾᬂᬟᬃᬫᬧ᭄ᬭᬚᬳᬶᬢ "Blessing Protection of Dharma (Religion) to Achieve People's Welfare"
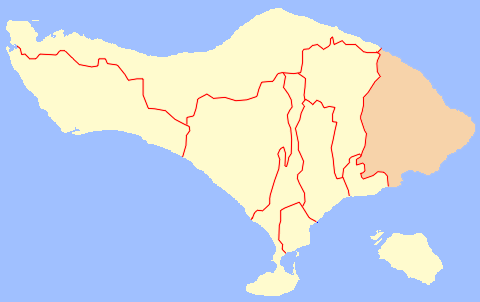
- Location within Bali

- Location in Bali Location in Lesser Sunda Islands Location in Indonesia Location in Southeast Asia Location in Asia
- Coordinates: 8°23′S 115°31′E
- Country: Indonesia
- Region: Lesser Sunda Islands
- Province: Bali
- Districts: List: Rendang; Sidemen; Manggis; Karangasem; Abang; Bebandem; Selat; Kubu
- Established: 14 August 1958
- Capital: Amlapura

Government
  - Body: Karangasem Regency Government
  - Regent: I Gusti Putu Parwata (NasDem)
  - Vice Regent: I Wayan Pandu Prapanca Lagosa
  - Legislature: Karangasem Regency Regional House of Representatives (DPRD)

Area
  - Total: 323.04 sq mi (836.68 km^{2})
- Elevation: 289 ft (88 m)

Population (mid 2024 estimate)
  - Total: 538,390
  - Density: 1,666.6/sq mi (643.48/km^{2})

Demographics
  - Ethnic groups (2010): 97.34% Balinese; 1.57% Sasak; 0.70% Javanese; 0.07% Bali Aga; 0.06% Chinese; 0.03% Madurese; 0.02% Sundanese; 0.01% Malays; 0.01% Bugis; 0.01% Flores; 0.10% other
  - Religion (2024): 95.76% Hinduism; 3.96% Islam; 0.19% Christianity; 0.13% Protestanism; 0.06% Catholicism; 0.09% Buddhism
  - Languages and dialects: Indonesian (official); Balinese (native); Lowland Balinese; Karangasem Balinese; Highland Balinese other
- Time zone: UTC+8 (ICST)
- Area code: (+62) 363
- ISO 3166 code: ID-KRA
- Vehicle registration: DK
- HDI (2023): ▲0.709 high
- Website: karangasemkab.go.id

Karangasem Regency (Indonesian: Kabupaten Karangasem; Balinese: ᬓᬪᬹᬧᬢᬾᬦ᭄ ᬓᬭᬗᬲᭂᬫ᭄, Kabupatén Karangasĕm) is a regency (kabupaten) of the province of Bali, Indonesia. It covers the east part of Bali, has an area of 836.68 km^{2} (323.04 sq mi). It is bordered by Buleleng Regency and Bangli Regency to its west and Klungkung Regency to its south, and the Indian Ocean to its south, the Bali Sea and the Java Sea to its north and the Lombok Strait to its east. The population of the regency as of mid-2024 was 538,390. Its regency seat is the town of Amlapura.

Karangasem was devastated when Mount Agung erupted in 1963, killing 1,900 people. Karangasem was a kingdom before Bali was conquered by the Dutch.

== Etymology ==
The name Karangasem actually comes from the word Karang Semadi. Several notes containing the origin of the name karangasem are as expressed in the Sading C Inscription found in Geria Mandara, Munggu, Mengwi, Badung. It is further revealed that Mount Lempuyang in the northeast of Amlapura, was originally named Adri Karang which means Mount Karang.

The inscription tells that in the year 1072 Saka, the 12th day of the bright half-month, Wuku Julungwangi in the month of Cetra, Bathara Guru ordered one of his sons Sri Maharaja Jayasakti or Hyang Agnijaya to descend to Bali. The task carried out as quoted in the inscription reads "...gumawyeana Dharma rikang Adri Karang maka rakhayuan ing Jagat Bangsul...", which means "coming to Adri Karang to build a Temple (Dharma) to provide physical and spiritual safety for the Island of the Gods".

Hyang Agnijaya is said to have come with his brothers, namely Sambhu, Brahma, Indra, and Wisnu in Adri Karang (Mount Lempuyang to the northeast of the city of Amlapura). Mount Lempuyang was chosen by Bathara Guru as a place to spread His love for the salvation of mankind.

In historical research on the existence of temples, Lempuyang is connected to the word lampu which means chosen, and Hyang which means God (Bathara Guru, Hyang Parameswara). It was in Adri Karang that Hyang Agnijaya made the Lempuyang Luhur Temple as a place to meditate (Karang Semadi). Gradually the name Karang Semadi changed to Karangasem.

== History ==
In the 16th to 17th centuries, Karangasem was under the rule of the Gelgel Dynasty from Klungkung. The dynasty’s king was I Dewa Karangamla who was based in Selagumi (Balepunduk). I Dewa Karangamla married the widow of I Gusti Arya Batanjeruk, the patih (pm) of the kingdom who rebelled and was killed in Bungaya Village, on the condition that after their second marriage, the son of Batanjeruk's widow would become the ruler. This condition was agreed to and then I Dewa Karangamla's family moved from Selagumi to Batuaya. I Dewa Karangamla also had a son from his other wife named I Dewa Gde Batuaya. The transfer of power to the son of Batanjeruk's widow marked the beginning of the Karangasem Kingdom which was held by the Batanjeruk Dynasty. Karangasem led by the Batanjeruk dynasty then began to expand its territory both inside and outside the island.

=== Conquest of Lombok, Buleleng and Jembrana ===
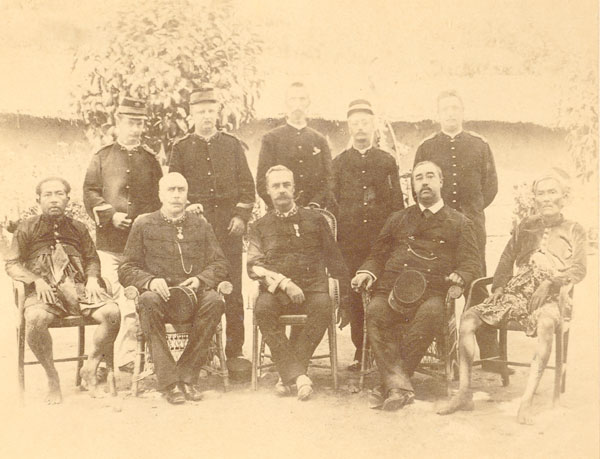
Leaders involved in the war in Lombok in 1894: Anak Agung Ketut Karangasem, Major General P.P.H. van Ham, Major General J.A. Vetter (commander), Resident M.C. Dannenbargh, and Gusti Gede Jelantik.

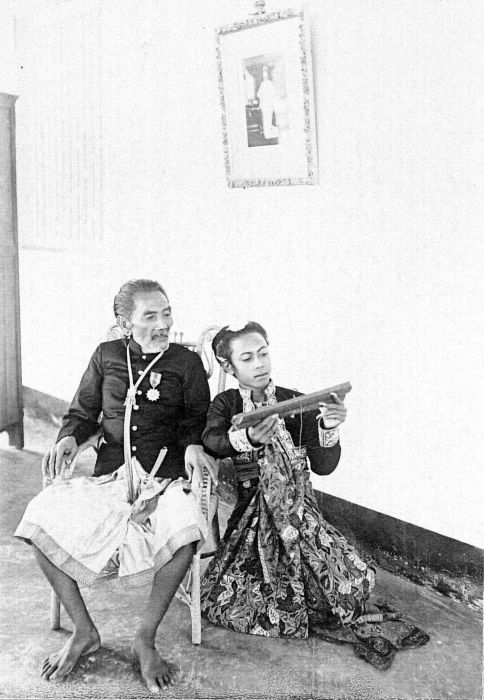
Gusti Gede Jelantik and his son, Gusti Bagus Jelantik, at the Puri Agung Karangasem (around 1900-an).

After King I Gusti Anglurah Ketut Karangasem died, the government of the Karangasem Kingdom was held by I Gusti Gede Karangasem (Dewata di Tohpati) between 1801 and 1806. At that time the territory of the Karangasem Kingdom grew larger, expanding its power to Buleleng and Jembrana. After his death, I Gusti Gede Ngurah Karangasem was replaced by his son named I Gusti Lanang Peguyangan who was also known as I Gusti Gede Lanang Karangasem.

The victory of the Buleleng Kingdom against the power of the Karangasem Kingdom caused the king of Karangasem, I Gusti Lanang Peguyangan, to step aside and at that time the Karangasem Kingdom was again controlled by the king of Buleleng, I Dewa Pahang. Power was finally recaptured by I Gusti Lanang Peguyangan. The rebellion of a punggawa of the kingdom named I Gusti Bagus Karang in 1827 succeeded in overthrowing I Gusti Lanang Peguyangan so that he fled to Lombok, and the throne of the Karangasem Kingdom was held by I Gusti Bagus Karang.

When I Gusti Bagus Karang died in attacking Lombok, at the same time the king of Buleleng, I Gusti Ngurah Made Karangasem, succeeded in conquering Karangasem and appointed his son-in-law I Gusti Gede Cotong as king of Karangasem. After I Gusti Gede Cotong was killed due to a power struggle, the throne of Karangasem was continued by the cousin of the king of Buleleng, I Gusti Ngurah Gede Karangasem.

Groups of Balinese nobles from the Karangasem Kingdom then began to control the western part of Lombok Island. One of them, the Bali-Mataram group, managed to control more than the other Bali groups, and eventually even controlled the entire island in 1839. Since then, Balinese court culture has also developed in Lombok.

On August 25, 1891, the son of the ruler of Bali-Mataram, Anak Agung Ketut Karangasem, was sent, along with 8,000 soldiers, to crush a rebellion in Praya, which was part of the Selaparang Kingdom. On September 8, 1891, a second force, under another son, Anak Agung Made Karangasem, with a strength of 3,000 men was sent as additional troops. Because the royal army seemed to be having difficulty in overcoming the situation, the help of the subordinate ruler of Karangasem, namely Anak Agung Gede Jelantik, was again requested to send 1,200 elite troops to end the rebellion. The war raged on from 1891 to 1894, and the Bali-Mataram army, which was more sophisticated in its weaponry, equipped with two modern warships, Sri Mataram and Sri Cakra, succeeded in occupying many rebellious villages and surrounding the

On 8 November 1894, the Dutch systematically fired cannons on Balinese positions at Cakranegara, destroying the palace, killing around 2,000 Balinese, while losing 166 themselves. By the end of November 1894, the Dutch had defeated all Balinese resistance, with thousands of Balinese killed, surrendering, or performing the puputan ritual. Lombok and Karangasem then became part of the Dutch East Indies, and the government was run from Bali. Gusti Gede Jelantik was appointed as Regent by the Dutch in 1894, and he ruled until 1908.

=== Colonial period ===
==== Dutch occupation period ====
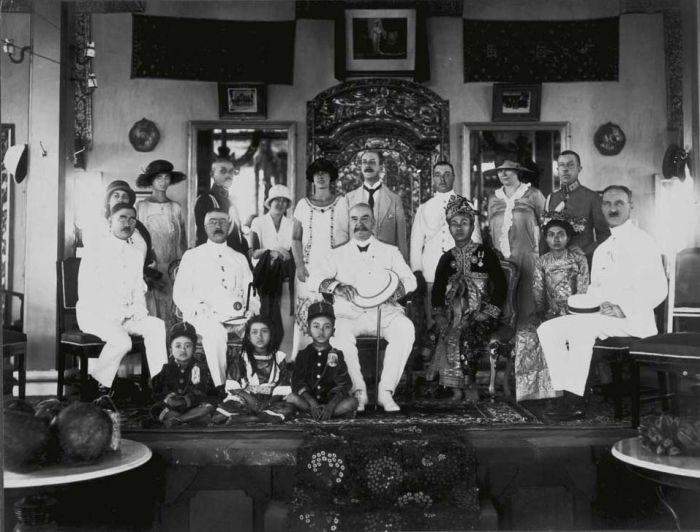
Anak Agung Agung Anglurah Ketut Karangasem when receiving a visit from Governor General Dirk Fock in 1925.

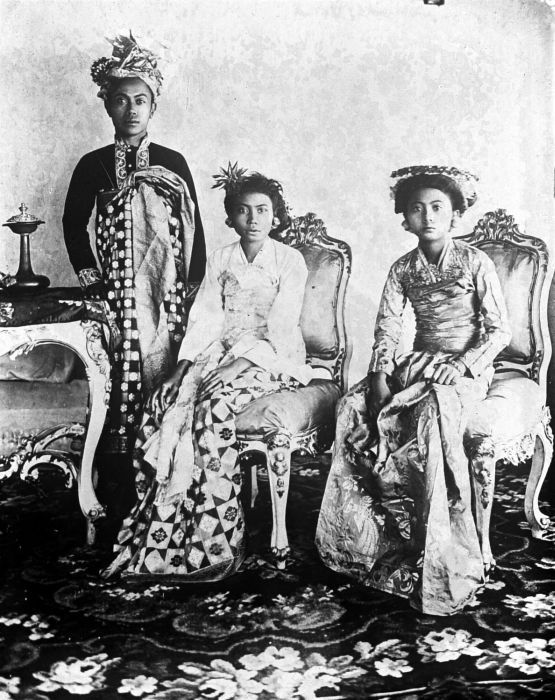
Anak Agung Agung Anglurah Ketut Karangasem with his wife. The furniture of Puri Agung Karangasem seen in the photo was a gift from Queen Wilhelmina from the Netherlands.

After the arrival of Netherlands, it also brought influence in terms of government bureaucracy. In 1906, in Bali there were three forms of government, namely:

- Rechtstreeks bestuurd gebied (direct government) covering Buleleng, Jembrana, and Lombok
- Zelfbestuurend landschappen (self-government) were Badung, Tabanan, Klungkung, and Bangli
- Stedehouder (representative of the Dutch government) were Gianyar and Karangasem

Thus in the Karangasem Kingdom, the successive Stedehouder (ruler) were I Gusti Gede Jelantik in 1894–1908, and Stedehouder I Gusti Bagus Jelantik who had the title Anak Agung Agung Anglurah Ketut Karangasem (Dewata di Maskerdam) in 1908–1950, which was in charge of 21 Punggawa, namely Karangasem, Seraya, Bugbug, Ababi, Abang, Culik, Kubu, Tianyar, Pesedahan, Manggis, Antiga, Ulakan, Bebandem. With the Decree of Governor General of the Dutch East Indies dated December 16, 1921, No. 27 Stbl. No. 756 in 1921, starting from January 1, 1922, Gouvernements Lanschap Karangasem was abolished, changed into an autonomous region, directly under the Government of Dutch East Indies, Karangasem Raad was formed which was chaired by Regent I Gusti Bagus Jelantik, while the Secretary was held by Controleur Karangasem.

As Regent, I Gusti Bagus Jelantik still used the title Stedehouder. The number of Punggawa which previously numbered 14 was reduced again to 8, namely: Rendang, Selat, Sidemen, Bebandem, Manggis, Karangasem, Abang, Kubu. With the Decree of Governor General of the Dutch East Indies dated September 4, 1928, No. 1, the title Stedehouder was replaced with the title Anak Agung Agung Anglurah Ketut Karangasem. By Decree Governor General of the Dutch East Indies dated June 30, 1938, No. 1 effective from July 1, 1938, he was appointed as Zelfbestuur Karangasem (head of autonomous). Along with the formation of the Karangasem Zelfbestuur, starting from July 1, 1938, the Zelfbestuur–Zelfbestuur were also formed throughout Bali, namely Klungkung, Bangli, Gianyar, Badung, Tabanan, Jembrana and Buleleng, where the rulers of the autonomous regions (Zelfbestuur) were united in a federation of kings called Paruman Agung.

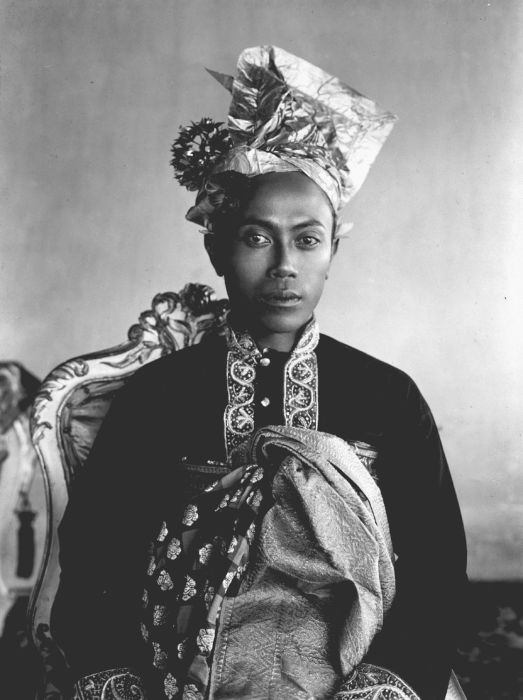
Portrait of Gusti Bagus Djilantik, Raja and Regent of Karangasem

In socio-cultural life, due to the influence of education obtained in the 19th century, many young intellectuals in various regions in Bali established youth, religious and scientific associations and organizations. In 1925, in Singaraja an association was established called "Suryakanta" and had a magazine also called "Suryakanta". Suryakanta wanted the Balinese people to progress in knowledge and eliminate customs that were no longer in accordance with the times. Meanwhile, in Karangasem an association was born called "Satya Samudaya Baudanda Bali-Lombok" whose members consisted of civil servants and the general public with the aim of saving and collecting money for the benefit of studiefonds.

=== Japanese occupation period ===
After going through several battles, the Japanese army landed on Sanur Beach, Badung, on February 18–19, 1942. From the direction of Sanur, the Japanese army entered the city of Denpasar without experiencing any resistance. Then, from Denpasar, Japan controlled all of Bali, including Karangasem. First of all, the Japanese Army (Rikugun) laid the foundation for Japanese rule in Bali. Then, when the situation was stable, control of the government was handed over to the civil government. When Japan entered Bali, Paruman Agung or the council of Balinese kings was changed to Sutyo Renmei.

=== Independence period ===
In 1945 after Japan surrendered and the independence of the Republic of Indonesia, Bali became part of the Government of the State of East Indonesia. The State of East Indonesia was dissolved and all its territories merged into the Republic of Indonesia on August 17, 1950. The autonomous government (kingdom) in Bali was changed to the Council of Kings with its seat in Denpasar and chaired by a king. In October 1950, the Karangasem Swapraja government took the form of the Karangasem Government Council, chaired by the chairman of the Daily Government Council held by the Head of Swapraja (King) and assisted by members of the Daily Government Assembly.

In 1951, the term Member of the Daily Government Assembly was changed to Member of the Karangasem Government Council. Based on Law No. 69 of 1958, effective from 1 December 1958, the autonomous regions in Bali were changed to Level II Regions at the regency level, including Karangasem.

== Geography ==
Lempuyang Hill

Karangasem is a regency located at the easternmost tip of Bali Island. Astronomically, this regency is located at 8°00'00"–8°41'37.8" South Latitude and 115°35'9.8"–115°54'8.9" East Longitude. The area of Karangasem Regency is 839.54 km² or 83,954 Ha consisting of 8 Districts, 75 villages, and 3 sub-districts. The sub-districts in Karangasem Regency include: Rendang, Sidemen, Manggis, Karangasem, Abang, Bebandem, Selat, and Kubu Districts.

=== Border ===
The borders of Karangasem Regency are as follows:

=== Southern ===
- Banjarangkan District
- Klungkung District
- Dawan District, Klungkung Regency
- Indian Ocean

=== Western ===
- Tejakula District, Buleleng Regency
- Kintamani
- Tembuku District, Bangli Regency
- Banjarangkan District
- Banjarangkan District
- Klungkung District
- Dawan District, Klungkung Regency
- Bali Sea
- Java Sea

=== Eastern ===
- Lombok Strait

=== Topography ===
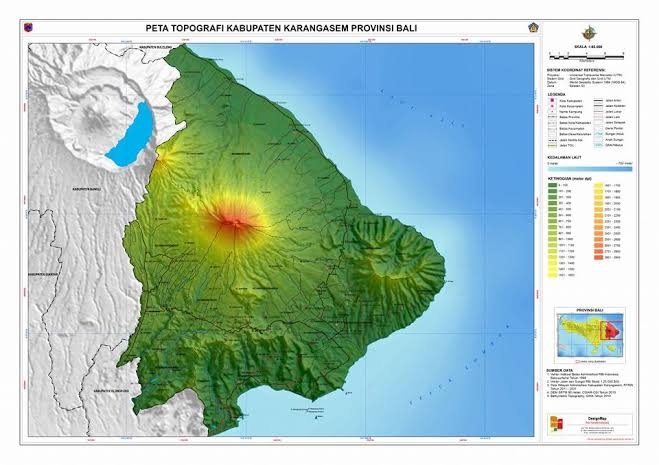
Topographic map of Karangasem Regency

Karangasem Regency has an area bordering the sea to the mountains with Mount Agung as its peak. Thus, the height of the place varies from 0–3,142 m above sea level and most of the Karangasem area has an altitude of between 100–500 m above sea level and 500–1000 m above sea level. This means that some of its areas are hills to mountains. The plains area only covers 13.4% of the area, which is only spread in coastal areas.

Based on the slope level, the largest plain area is in Karangasem District with an area of 3,798 ha, followed by Abang District with an area of 3,718 ha, while the largest very steep area is in Kubu District with an area of 4,898 ha, followed by Manggis District with an area of 2,306 ha. The following is a detailed classification of the land slope level:

1. A slope of 0–8% is a flat area (flat to almost flat), with its distribution covering all districts with an area of 23,090.00 Ha or 27.5% of the total area of Karangasem Regency. The largest area is in Kubu District, which is 5,011.00 Ha or 21.7% of the area with a slope of 0–8%.
2. A slope of 8–15% is a rather gentle area (gentle sloping), with its distribution covering all sub-districts except Sidemen Sub-district with an area of 12,860 Ha or 15.3% of the total area of Karangasem Regency. The largest area is in Kubu Sub-district, which is 5,826 Ha or 45.3% of the area with a slope of 8–15%.
3. A slope of 15–25% is a rather steep area (moderately steep), with its distribution covering all sub-districts with an area of 16,682.00 Ha or 19.9% of the total area of Karangasem Regency. The largest area is in Rendang Sub-district, which is 5,634 Ha or 33.8% of the area with a slope of 15–25%.
4. Slope of 25–40%, is a steep area (moderately steep), with its distribution covering all sub-districts with an area of 14,794 Ha or 17.6% of the total area of Karangasem Regency. The largest area is in Abang District, which is 3,495 Ha or 23.6% of the area with a slope of 25–40%.
5. Slope above 40%, is a very steep area in all sub-districts with an area of 16,258 Ha or 19.7% of the total area of Karangasem Regency. The largest area is in Kubu District, which is 4,898 Ha or 29.6% of the area with a slope above 40%.

=== Geology ===
Geologically, Karangasem Regency consists of Quaternary, Lower Quaternary, and Miocene formations. The Quaternary formation covers most of the regency area. Quaternary Formation with Sandy Tufa Lithology and lahar deposits are found on the north coast, namely in the Tianyar area. Lithology in the form of lahar, sand, bomb-directed lapilli, dark brown to black in color. Its distribution is in the areas of Mount Agung, Selat, Muncan, along the Tukad Buhu flow, and Tukad Bangka. In the northern hemisphere starting from the Mount Agung area, Kubu District area, part of Abang District, Unda river basin. The composition of the lahar consists of andesite igneous rocks and pumice with sandy tuff base period. The sand composition consists of faalspar, volcanic glass, and black minerals. The lapilli and bombs consist of pumice and andesite lava, generally these rocks have not hardened and are easily separated. In places on these rocks there are lava and breccia, compact and hard, some of the lava is hollow. The Lower Quaternary Formation is found in the eastern tip of the district, namely the eastern part of Karangasem District and the northern part of Abang District. The lithology is lava and breccia of Seraya Volcano. Lava is blackish gray. Breccia is brown. The Miosin Formation is found in the hills of Manggis and Selat Districts. The lithology is breccia and lava is the Ulakan formation. Lava is blackish gray and breccia is blackish brown.

The types of soil found in Karangasem Regency are Mediterranean, alluvial, latosol, and regosol. Mediterranean soil types are the smallest (147 ha or 0.2%), distributed in the coastal areas of Manggis sub-district such as parts of Antiga Village, Ulakan Village, Manggis Village, Nyuh Tebel (Karangasem Sub-district). Alluvial soil types are spread across Sidemen, Manggis, Karangasem, Bebandem and Selat Sub-districts. Then latosol (area 36,325 ha or 43.3%) in the eastern part of Karangasem Sub-district (Seraya Village, West Seraya, East Seraya), parts of Abang Sub-district such as Purwakerti Village, the Manggis hilly area to parts of the southern part of Selat Sub-district, and parts of Sidemen Sub-district. This type of latosol soil is generally very prone to erosion, especially in East Karangasem Sub-district because the soil consists of loose rocks with less vegetation and steep slopes. Regosol soil type (area 36,784 ha or 43.8%) covers the largest part of Karangasem Regency. Its distribution is from the northern part to the central part. This type of soil is also prone to erosion, especially in areas with hig.

=== Hydrology ===
Several rivers flow through Karangasem Regency, including two rivers with significant potential for development as water sources to meet the water needs of Karangasem residents: the Tukad Unda River and the Tukad Telaga Waja River. Based on their flow continuity, rivers in Karangasem Regency are divided into three categories:

1. Perennial streams generally flow southward. Examples of rivers that flow year-round include Tukad Janga, Tukad Telagawaja, Tukad Mangereng, Tukad Jinah, Tukad Nyuling, Tukad Kekeruk, Tukad Buhu, and others.
2. Intermittent streams flow only during the rainy season. These rivers are found primarily in the villages of Seraya, West Seraya, Bugbug, and Perasi.
3. Flowing only during the rainy season (ephemeral streams), generally all rivers in Kubu District, parts of Abang District (Purwakerthi, Labasari), and parts of Karangasem District (East Seraya).

=== Climate ===
Air temperatures in Karangasem Regency vary greatly due to altitude. However, the average air temperature in Karangasem Regency generally ranges between 20°–32°C, although temperatures in hilly and mountainous areas are usually below 20°C. Relative humidity levels in this region also vary between 76%–81%. Based on the Koppen climate classification, most of Karangasem Regency has a tropical wet and dry climate (Aw) with two seasons: the dry season and the rainy season. The dry season in the Karangasem region usually occurs between May–October, with the driest months being August and September, with monthly rainfall below 20 mm per month. Meanwhile, the rainy season in Karangasem Regency occurs between November–April, with the wettest months being January and February, with monthly rainfall above 200 mm per month. Annual rainfall in the Karangasem Regency area ranges from 1,000–1,700 mm per year, with rainfall ranging from 90–140 rainy days per year.

Climate data for Karangasem Regency
Month	Jan	Feb	Mar	Apr	May	Jun	Jul	Aug	Sep	Oct	Nov	Dec	Year
Mean daily maximum °C (°F)	30.0 (86.0)	30.0 (86.0)	30.0 (86.0)	30.5 (86.9)	30.0 (86.0)	29.0 (84.2)	29.0 (84.2)	29.0 (84.2)	30.0 (86.0)	30.5 (86.9)	30.5 (86.9)	30.5 (86.9)	29.9 (85.9)
Daily mean °C (°F)	27.0 (80.6)	27.0 (80.6)	27.0 (80.6)	27.5 (81.5)	27.0 (80.6)	26.5 (79.7)	26.0 (78.8)	26.0 (78.8)	26.5 (79.7)	27.0 (80.6)	27.5 (81.5)	27.5 (81.5)	26.9 (80.4)
Mean daily minimum °C (°F)	25.0 (77.0)	25.0 (77.0)	25.0 (77.0)	25.0 (77.0)	24.5 (76.1)	24.0 (75.2)	23.5 (74.3)	23.5 (74.3)	24.0 (75.2)	24.5 (76.1)	25.0 (77.0)	25.0 (77.0)	24.5 (76.1)
Average precipitation mm (inches)	379 (14.9)	348 (13.7)	259 (10.2)	133 (5.2)	133 (5.2)	85 (3.3)	103 (4.1)	59 (2.3)	80 (3.1)	150 (5.9)	181 (7.1)	292 (11.5)	2,202 (86.5)
Average precipitation days (≥ days)	21	19	18	13	8	6	4	3	2	4	10	17	125
Source: BPS "Karangasem Regency in Figures" / Weather2Visit / WeatherAPI

== Demographics ==
=== Population ===
The population of Karangasem was 416,600 people in 2019, and in mid-2024 it was 536,477 people. Karangasem is the 3rd most populous region in the Bali Province after the Denpasar City.

=== Religion ===
According to the 2024 census, 95.76% of Karangasem's population is Hindu while 3.96% are Islam which are generally practiced by Sasak people and Javanese while the rest adhere to other religions such as Christianity (0.19%) and Buddhism (0.09%) which are generally practiced by the Chinese Balinese community, Christianity in Karangasem is divided into two, namely Protestantism which is practiced by 0.13% of the population while Catholicism is practiced by 0.06% of the population.

=== Ethnic groups ===
Karangasem, like other regencies in Bali, is inhabited by the Balinese peoples and Bali Aga tribes. In addition, there are other ethnic villages such as Muslim Sasak, which is likely due to historical factors, where Lombok was once controlled by the Karangasem Kingdom. The Sasak people in Karangasem call themselves Karang Sasak which means they have mixed with the local Balinese tribe. there is also a Balinese Chinese community near the border with Bangli Regency, they have built many churches and monasteries.

=== Languages ===
The official language is Indonesian, and the local languages are Balinese Karangasem dialect and Bali Aga, the Karangasem Balinese language has various sub-dialects, such as Kubu, Bebandem, Sidemen, Selat, etc., besides Balinese, in Karangasem there are also residents who speak Sasak language in several villages in Karangasem including Tianyar village in East Karangasem. The Sasak language in Karangasem is increasingly being abandoned because young people are more fluent in Karangasem Balinese.

== Government and politics ==
No	Regent	Start of Term	End of Term	Vice Regent
11	I Gusti Putu Parwata	February 20, 2025	Incumbent	I Wayan Pandu Prapanca Lagosa

=== Parliament ===
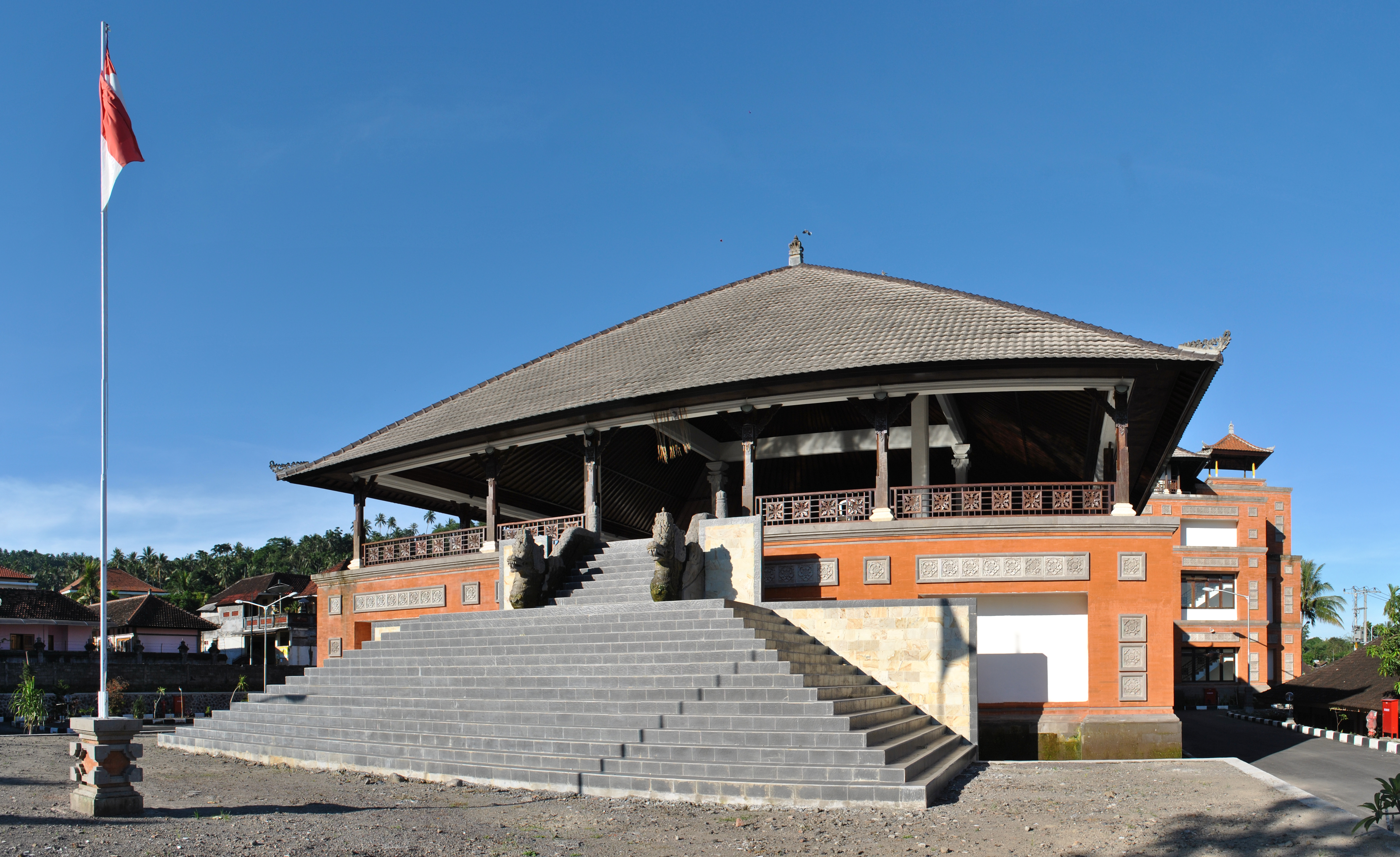
Karangasem's parliament (DPRD) Building

=== Administrative districts ===
The regency is divided into eight districts (kecamatan), tabulated below with their areas and population totals at the 2010 Census and the 2020 Census, together with the official estimates as at mid 2024. All districts share the same name as their administrative centres. The table also includes the number of administrative villages in each district (totaling 75 rural desa and 3 urban kelurahan – the latter all in Karangasem District), and its postal codes.

Kode Wilayah	Name of District (kecamatan)	Area in km^{2}	Pop'n Census 2010	Pop'n Census 2020	Pop'n Estimate mid 2024	No. of villages	Post codes
51.07.01	Rendang	109.67	36,931	41,782	44,380	6	80863
51.07.02	Sidemen	42.81	31,617	37,045	40,080	10	80864
51.07.03	Manggis	76.64	44,041	54,608	58,100	12	80871
51.07.04	Karangasem (district) ^{(a)}	92.21	82,606	100,036	107,240	11 ^{(b)}	80811 -80813
51.07.05	Abang	131.32	60,965	80,345	89,230	14	80852
51.07.06	Bebandem	80.99	45,160	54,941	59,310	8	80861
51.07.07	Selat	71.83	38,114	44,284	47,390	8	80862
51.07.08	Kubu	231.32	57,053	79,361	92,660	9	80853
	Totals	836.68	396,487	492,402	538,390	76	

Note: (a) including 6 small offshore islands. (b) including 3 kelurahan – the towns of Karangasem, Subagan and Padang Kerta.

== Tourism ==
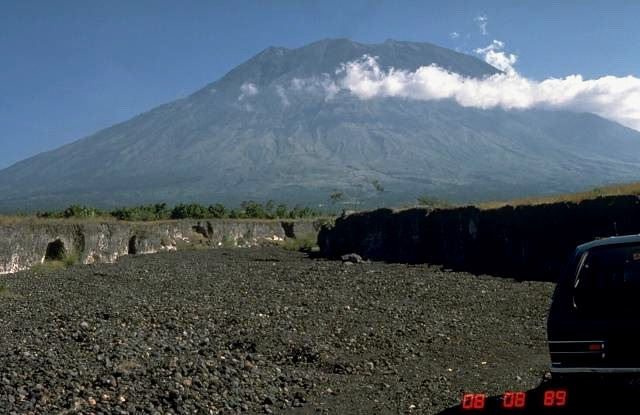
Mount Agung

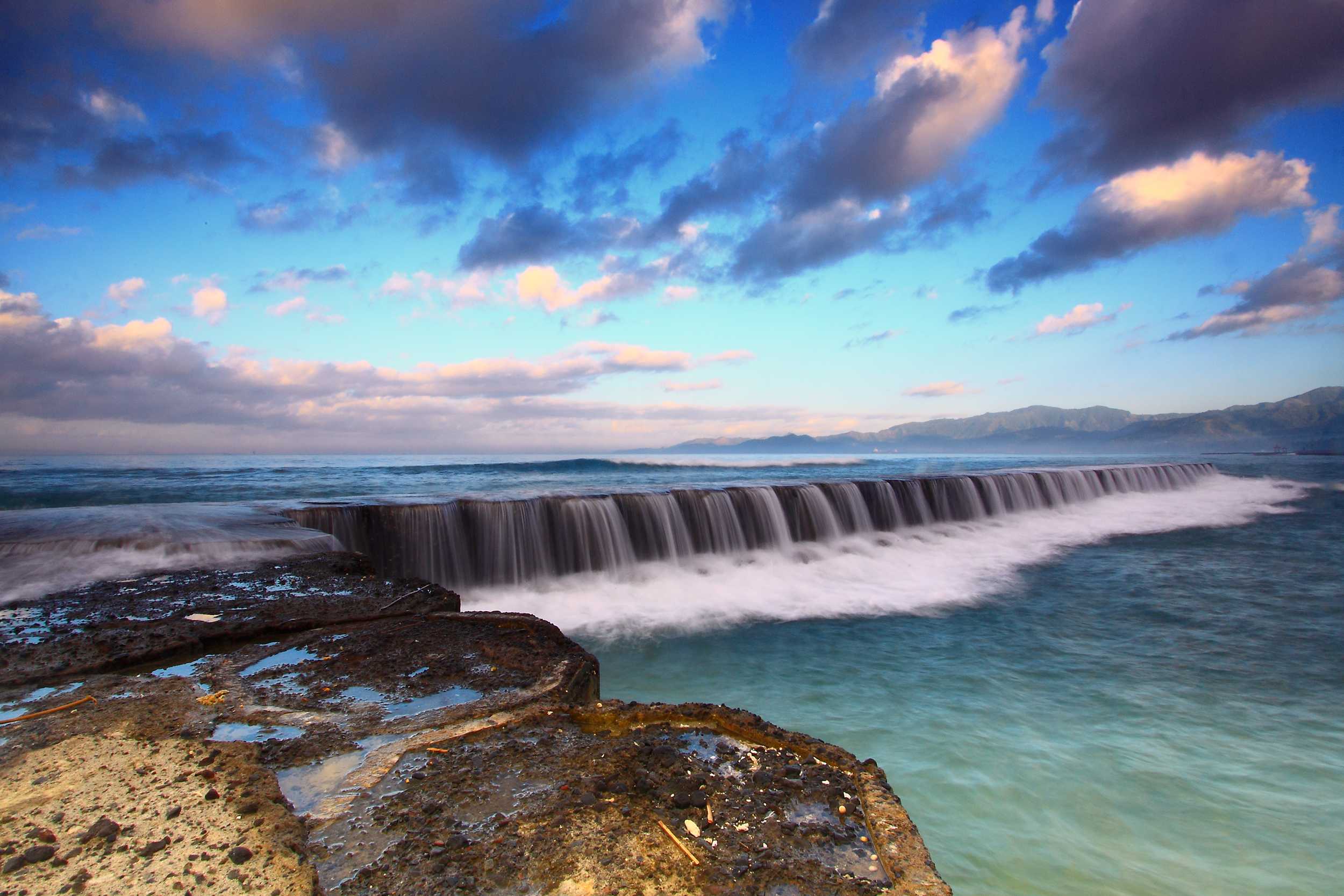
A jetty at Candidasa beach, Bali

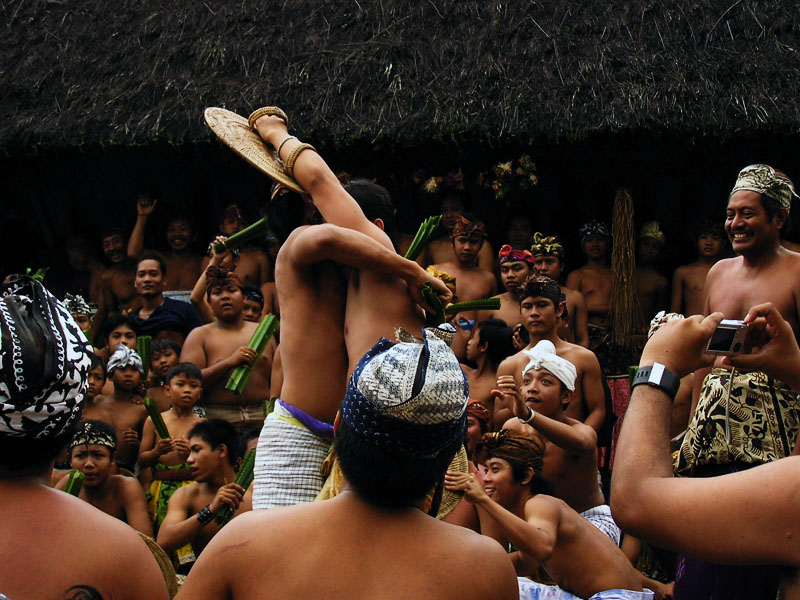
Geret Pandan Rites

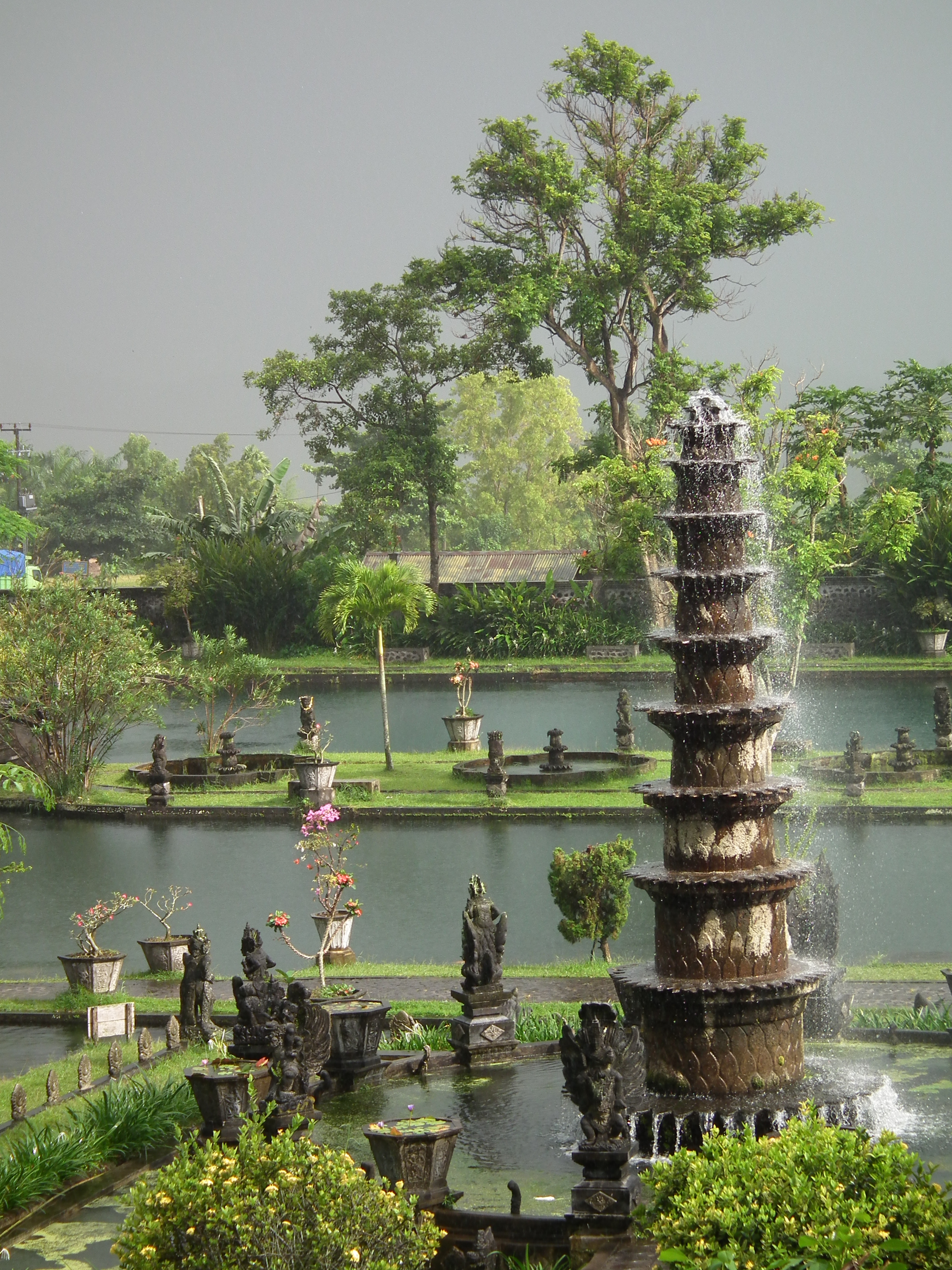
One of the fountains in Tirta Gangga water palace

Interesting places include:

- The major Pura Besakih Hindu temple, sometimes called the Mother Temple of Besakih.
- Mount Agung, the highest peak in Bali.
- Telaga Waja River, the only rafting spot in eastern Bali.
- Tenganan "the original Bali", a Bali Aga village whose inhabitants have kept many of their ancient traditions.
- Amed, a beach town.
- Tulamben, a dive site.
- Candidasa, a starting point for visiting the east coast of Bali. East of Candidasa is the village of Bugbug, whose inhabitants celebrate the Perang Dawa (war of the gods) every other year on the full moon of the fourth month, October.
- Prasi Beach in Prasi village, known as Pantai Pasir Putih (White Sand Beach) or Virgin Beach. This beach is mainly free of crowds, less polluted, and popular for swimming or snorkeling from April to October.
- Ujung Water Palace, built by the King Anak Agung Agung Anglurah Ketut Karangasem.
- Tirta Gangga water palace.
- Puri Agung Karangasem, collectively several royal palaces of the Karangasem kingdom.
- Budakeling, an area where both Hindus and Muslims live. Saren Jawa village is home to 100 Muslim families, surrounded by Balinese Hindu villages following the Siwa-Buda belief system, which is a combination of Hinduism and Mahayana Buddhism. The people of Saren Jawa use Balinese first names before their Muslim last names, such as Ni Nyoman Maimunah.
- Seraya Village, which keeps the Gebug Ende tradition related to scarcity of water during drought season.
- Mencol Hill, the eastern-most hill on Bali island. It is known as a sunrise viewpoint; the temple at the peak of the grassy hill has a view to the east coast and Gili Selang islet.

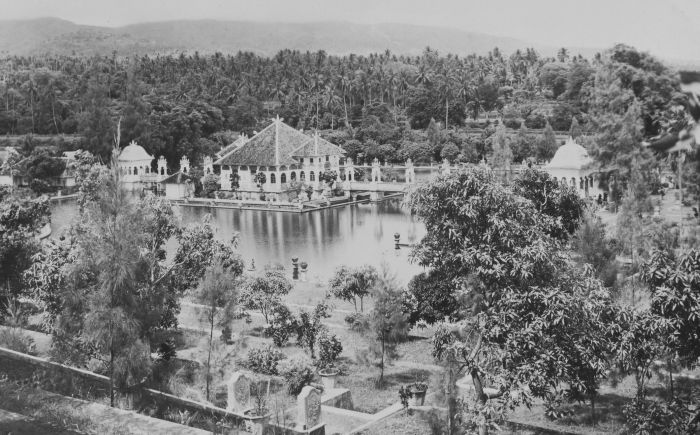
Ujung Water Palace in 1935

== Ports ==
Karangasem has two ports, namely Padang Bai Port and Tanah Ampo Port.

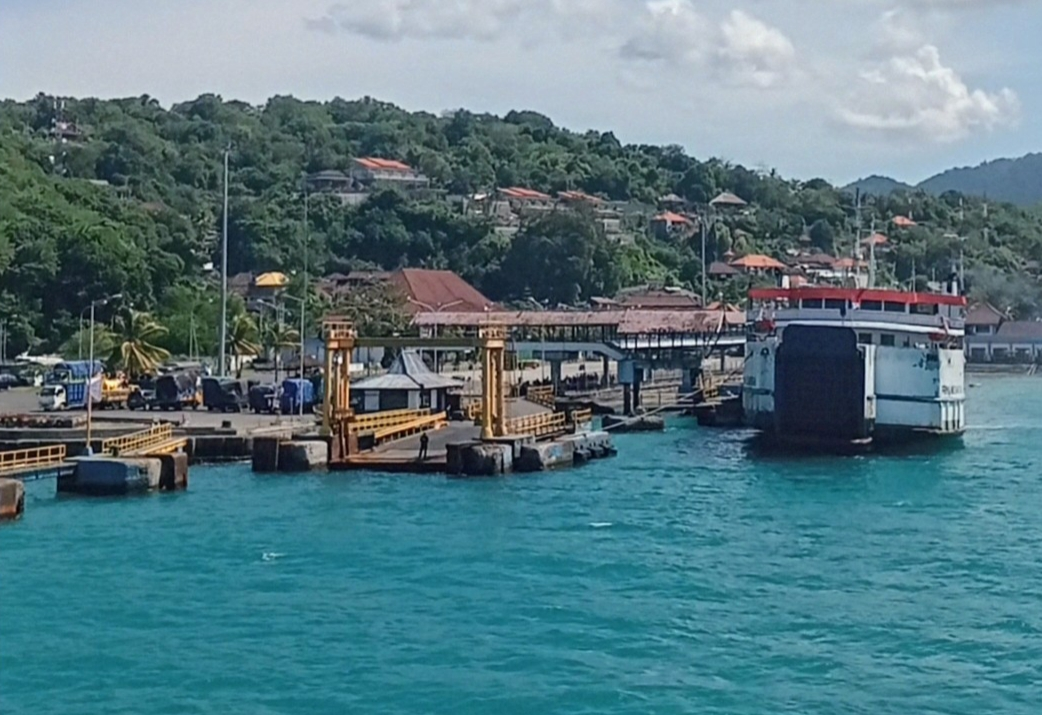
Padang Bai Port

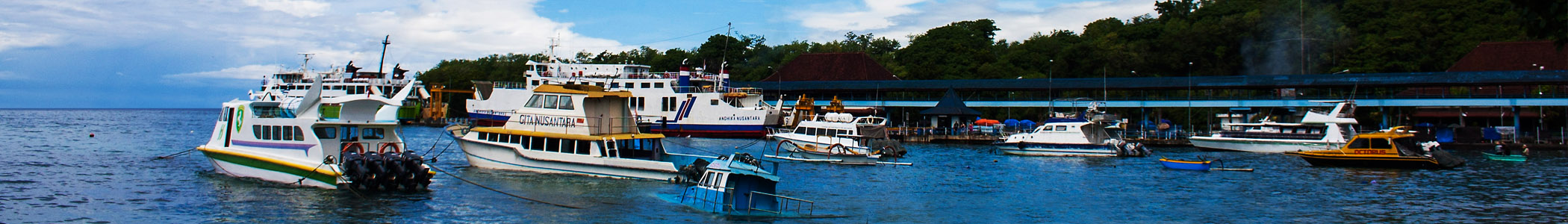
Cruise ship at Padang Bai Port
