= PDC =

PDC may refer to:

== In science and technology ==
=== Chemistry, biology and medicine ===
- Phosducin, a human protein and gene in the retina
- Pyridinium dichromate (Cornforth reagent), a chromium-based oxidant
- Pyruvate dehydrogenase complex, an enzyme complex
- Plasmacytoid dendritic cell

=== Computing ===
- Peripheral DMA controller
- Personal decompression computer, for scuba divers
- Personal Digital Cellular, a Japanese 2G mobile phone standard
- Primary Domain Controller
- Professional Developers Conference, by Microsoft
- Programme Delivery Control, a teletext standard

=== Other uses in science and technology ===
- Power distribution center, electrical equipment
- Pulsed DC, type of electric current
- Pyroclastic density current or pyroclastic flow of a volcano

== Politics and government ==
- Centrist Democratic Party (Rwanda)
- Christian Democratic People's Party of Switzerland
- Partido Demócrata Cristiano (disambiguation), several parties in Central & South America
- Christian Democratic Party (Brazil) (Partido Democrata Cristão)
- Catalan European Democratic Party
- Portland Development Commission, later Prosper Portland, Oregon, US
- Washington State Public Disclosure Commission, US
- Constitutional Democratic Party (disambiguation), several parties across the world
- Parlementair Documentatie Centrum (Parliamentary Documentation Centre), (Netherlands), an institute that documents Dutch parliamentary history

== Organizations ==
- PDC (gang), later rap group, London, UK
- Pacific Disaster Center, disaster preparedness institute based in Hawaii
- Partisan Defense Committee, a Trotskyist legal defense organization
- Phi Delta Chi, pharmaceutical fraternity at the University of Michigan
- Philosophy Documentation Center, a publisher
- Producers Distributing Corporation, 1920s US film company
- Professional Darts Corporation, operates darts competitions
- Publications Distribution Cooperative

== Other uses ==
- Pennsylvania Dutch language (ISO 639-3 language code)
- Pocket Dream Console, a game console
- Permaculture Design Certificate course on sustainable systems by Geoff Lawton
- Playa del Carmen, a resort city in southeastern Mexico
