= Constitution Party =

Constitution Party, Constitutional Party, or Constitutionalist Party may refer to one of several political parties.

== Active parties ==
- Constitution Party (Egypt)
- Constitution Party (United States)
  - American Constitution Party (Colorado)
  - Constitution Party of Oregon

== Historical parties ==
- Constitutional Party (Austria)
- Progressive Party (China)
- Constitutional Party (Costa Rica)
- Constitution Party (Estonia)
- National Constitution Party of Hungary
- Constitutionalist Party of Iran
- Constitutional Party (Spain)
- Constitution Party (United States, 1952)
- Constitutional Party (Uruguay)
- Constitutional Party (Malta)
- Constitutional Party (Peru)
- Constitutionalist Party (South Africa), see 1910 South African Senate election

== Alternate names ==
- Kenseitō or Constitutional Party, a political party in Japan
- Kenseikai or Constitutional Association, a political party in Japan
- Junimea, a Romanian movement briefly active as the Constitutional Party

== See also ==
- Constitutional Bloc (disambiguation)
- Constitutional Democratic Party, a political party in the Russian Empire
- Constitutional Democratic Party (disambiguation)
- Constitutional Union Party (disambiguation)
- Constitutionalism, a political ideology marked by adherence to a constitution
- Constitutionalist Liberal Party, a political party in Nicaragua
- Destour or the Constitutional Liberal Party, a political party in Tunisia
- Kensei Hontō or Constitutional Main Party, a political party in Japan
- New Constitution Party of Canada, an unregistered party in Canada
- Progressive Constitutionalist Party (Malta)
- Progressive Constitutionalist Party (Mexico)
- Rikken Dōshikai or Constitutional Association of Allies, a political party in Japan
- Rikken Kaishintō or Constitutional Reform Party, a political party in Japan
- Rikken Kokumintō or Constitutional Nationalist Party, a political party in Japan
- Rikken Minseitō or Constitutional Democratic Party, a political party in Japan
- Rikken Seiyūkai or Constitutional Association of Political Friendship, a political party in Japan
- Rikken Teiseitō or Constitutional Imperial Rule Party, a political party in Japan
- Zhi Xian Party (Constitution-Foremost Party of China), a political party in the People's Republic of China
