= CDP =

CDP may refer to:

== Places ==
- Census-designated place, an unincorporated area in the U.S. for which census data is collected
- Cuddapah Airport (IATA identifier: CDP), Andhra Pradesh, India

== Technology ==
- Cache Discovery Protocol, an extension to the BitTorrent file-distribution system
- Certificate in Data Processing, a professional certification conferred by the ICCP
- Charger Downstream Port, a type of battery-charging USB port
- Cisco Discovery Protocol, a proprietary data link network protocol developed by Cisco Systems
- Columbia Data Products, formerly a computer manufacturer, now a software company
- Composers Desktop Project, non-realtime audio digital-signal processing (DSP) software
- Content delivery platform, a system for managing and deploying web content
- Continuous Data Protection, whereby computer data is continuously backed up
- Customer data platform, marketer-based management system for customer profiles

== Science and medicine ==
- Coronary Drug Project, a trial of treatments for coronary heart disease
- Cytidine diphosphate, a nucleotide

== Political parties ==
- Constitutional Democratic Party of Japan
- Centrist Democratic Party of the Philippines
- Congress for Democracy and Progress, a political party of Burkina Faso
- Constitutional Democratic Party (disambiguation)
- Christian Democratic Party (Australia)
- Christian Democratic Party (Samoa)

== Other uses ==
- Bureau of Cyberspace and Digital Policy, a U.S. Department of State agency
- Carbon Disclosure Project, of greenhouse gas emissions
- Cassa Depositi e Prestiti, investment bank of Italy
- Center for Domestic Preparedness, a U.S. government emergency response training facility
- Châteauneuf-du-Pape AOC, a French wine appellation
- Coeur de Pirate, a leading Canadian writer and singer of popular music in French and English, real name Béatrice Martin, born Montreal 1989
- Collateralized debt position, a type of structured asset-backed security
- Collett Dickenson Pearce, a British advertising agency
