= Certificate in Data Processing =

Professional certification

The Certificate in Data Processing (CDP) was a certification administered by the Data Processing Management Association. The CDP required several years experience in information technology, the recommendation of a current CDP holder, and the successful completion of a six-part written exam.

== History ==
The CDP certification exam originated in 1960 to 1962 under the auspices of the Data Processing Management Association (DPMA), successor to the National Machine Accountants Association and predecessor to the current Association of Information Technology Professionals. In 1974, the exam began to be administered by the Institute for Certification of Computing Professionals (ICCP) which was formed by nine constituent industry organizations. "Awards for Excellence" consisting of a certificate and a CDP key were given to those scoring highest in each of the exam's five sections.

The exam tested the individual's knowledge and experience with hardware, operating systems, telecommunication, systems, programming, and other data processing areas. If one failed a section, only that section needed to be retaken to complete the certification. Initially, most of the hardware, OS, and programming sections were largely IBM-oriented. By the mid-1980s, these sections included references to DEC, UNIX, and other operating systems, vendors, or standards.

== Credential ==
The exam credential was later renamed by the ICCP to Certified Computing Professional (CCP) and existing CDP holders were assigned the new credential. Continuing education requirements for re-certification were not part of the original CDP certification, but were also added by the ICCP. CCP examinations and re-certifications continue under the administration of the ICCP today.

Guy L. Steele, Jr. wrote a filk song making fun of the certificate, called "Song of the Certified Data Processor".

== See also ==
- Data processing inequality
