= DPMA =

DPMA is an acronym that may refer to:

- Data Processing Management Association, now Association of Information Technology Professionals
- Deutsches Patent- und Markenamt, the German Patent and Trade Mark Office
- Division de police maritime et aéroportuaire
