= Conservative Catholic =

Conservative Catholics may refer to:

- Conservative Christianity
- Traditionalist Catholicism
- Conservative Catholics (Italy)
- Christian Democratic People's Party of Switzerland, originally called Catholic Conservative Party

== See also ==
- Christian democracy (disambiguation)
- Social conservatism
