= Constitutionalism =

Belief that government authority derives from fundamental law

Constitutionalism is "a compound of ideas, attitudes, and patterns of behavior elaborating the principle that the authority of government derives from and is limited by a body of fundamental law".

Political organizations are constitutional to the extent that they "contain institutionalized mechanisms of power control for the protection of the interests and liberties of the citizenry, including those that may be in the minority". As described by political scientist and constitutional scholar David Fellman:

Constitutionalism is descriptive of a complicated concept, deeply embedded in historical experience, which subjects the officials who exercise governmental powers to the limitations of a higher law. Constitutionalism proclaims the desirability of the rule of law as opposed to rule by the arbitrary judgment or mere fiat of public officials ... Throughout the literature dealing with modern public law and the foundations of statecraft the central element of the concept of constitutionalism is that in political society government officials are not free to do anything they please in any manner they choose; they are bound to observe both the limitations on power and the procedures which are set out in the supreme, constitutional law of the community. It may therefore be said that the touchstone of constitutionalism is the concept of limited government under a higher law.

== Definition ==
Constitutionalism has prescriptive and descriptive uses. Law professor Gerhard Casper captured this aspect of the term in noting, "Constitutionalism has both descriptive and prescriptive connotations. Used descriptively, it refers chiefly to the historical struggle for constitutional recognition of the people's right to 'consent' and certain other rights, freedoms, and privileges. Used prescriptively, its meaning incorporates those features of government seen as the essential elements of the... Constitution".

=== Descriptive ===
One example of constitutionalism's descriptive use is law professor Bernard Schwartz's five volume compilation of sources seeking to trace the origins of the U.S. Bill of Rights. Beginning with English antecedents going back to Magna Carta (1215), Schwartz explores the presence and development of ideas of individual freedoms and privileges through colonial charters and legal understandings. Then in carrying the story forward, he identifies revolutionary declarations and constitutions, documents and judicial decisions of the Confederation period and the formation of the federal Constitution. Finally, he turns to the debates over the federal Constitution's ratification that ultimately provided mounting pressure for a federal bill of rights. While hardly presenting a straight line, the account illustrates the historical struggle to recognize and enshrine constitutional rights and principles in a constitutional order.

=== Prescriptive ===
In contrast to describing what constitutions are, a prescriptive approach addresses what a constitution should be. As presented by the Canadian philosopher Wil Waluchow, constitutionalism embodies

the idea ... that government can and should be legally limited in its powers, and that its authority depends on its observing these limitations. This idea brings with it a host of vexing questions of interest not only to legal scholars, but to anyone keen to explore the legal and philosophical foundations of the state.

One example of this prescriptive approach was a project of the National Municipal League to develop a model state constitution.

=== Constitutionalism vis-à-vis Constitution ===
The study of constitutions is not necessarily synonymous with the study of constitutionalism. Legal historian Christian G. Fritz distinguishes between "constitutional questions", examining how the constitution was interpreted and applied to distribute power and authority as the new nation struggled with problems of war and peace, taxation and representation, and "questions of constitutionalism —how to identify the collective sovereign, what powers the sovereign possessed, and how one recognized when that sovereign acted." He noted that "questions of constitutionalism could not be answered by reference to given constitutional text or even judicial opinions" but were "open-ended questions drawing upon competing views".

A similar distinction was drawn by British constitutional scholar A.V. Dicey in assessing Britain's unwritten constitution. Dicey noted a difference between the "conventions of the constitution" and the "law of the constitution". The "essential distinction" between the two concepts was that the law of the constitution was made up of "rules enforced or recognised by the Courts", making up "a body of 'laws' in the proper sense of that term." In contrast, the conventions of the constitution consisted "of customs, practices, maxims, or precepts which are not enforced or recognised by the Courts" but "make up a body not of laws, but of constitutional or political ethics".

== Core features ==
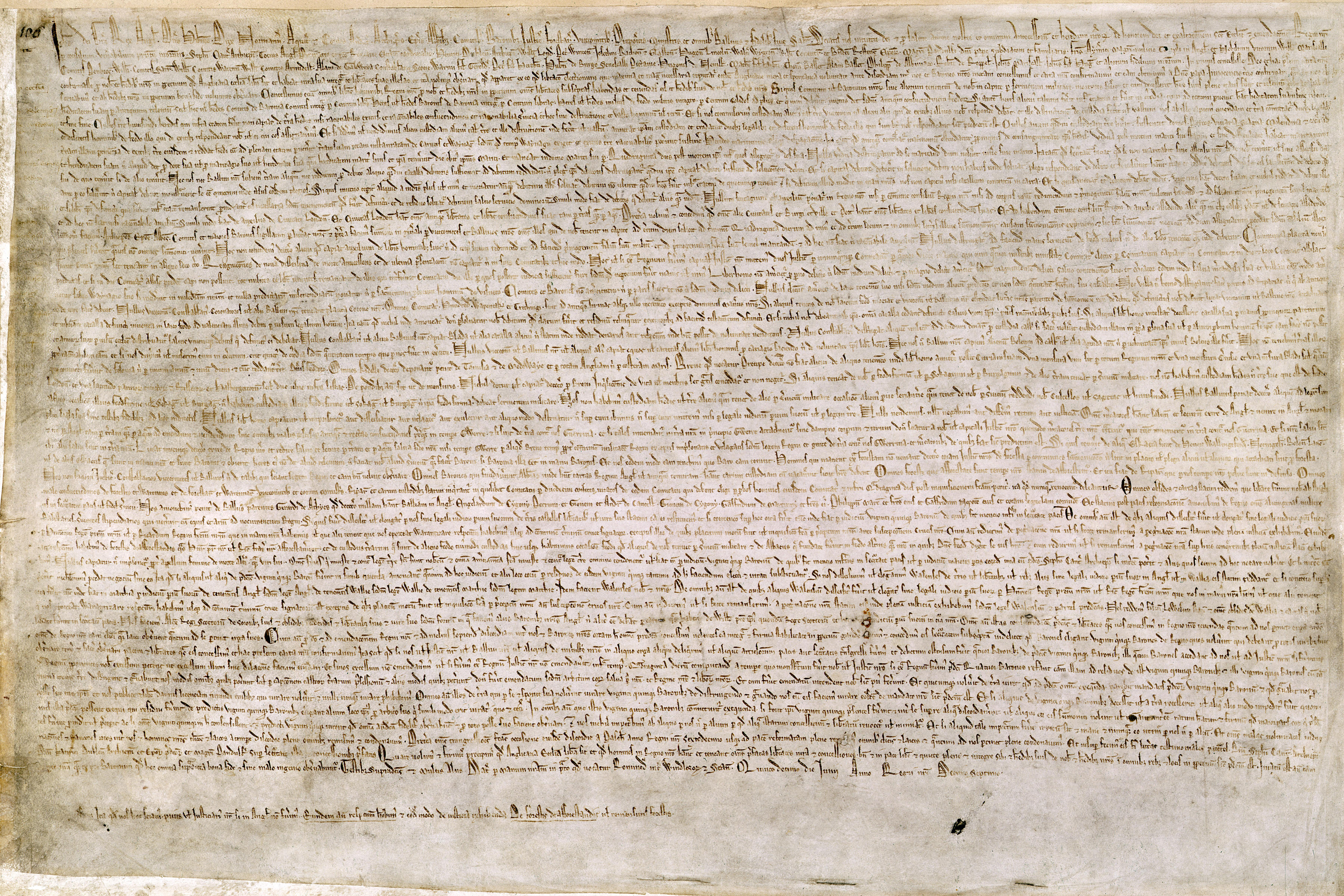
Magna Carta of England (the "Great Charter") created in 1215 is regarded as one of the greatest constitutional documents of all times.

=== Fundamental law and legitimacy of government ===
One of the most salient features of constitutionalism is that it describes and prescribes both the source and the limits of government power derived from fundamental law. William H. Hamilton has captured this dual aspect by noting that constitutionalism "is the name given to the trust which men repose in the power of words engrossed on parchment to keep a government in order."

Moreover, whether reflecting a descriptive or prescriptive focus, treatments of the concept of constitutionalism all deal with the legitimacy of government. One recent assessment of American constitutionalism, for example, notes that the idea of constitutionalism serves to define what it is that "grants and guides the legitimate exercise of government authority". Similarly, historian Gordon S. Wood described the most "advanced thinking" on the nature of constitutions wherein the constitution was conceived (according to Demophilis, who was possibly George Bryan) a "sett of fundamental rules by which even the supreme power of the state shall be governed." Ultimately, American constitutionalism came to rest on the collective sovereignty of the people, the source that legitimized American governments.

=== Civil rights and liberties ===
Constitutionalism is not simply about the power structure of society. It also asks for a strong protection of the interests of citizens, civil rights as well as civil liberties, for all, and has a close relation with democracy. The United Kingdom has several centuries-old laws limiting governmental power (for example, the Bill of Rights 1689). Historically, there has been little political support for introducing a comprehensive written or codified constitution in the UK. However, several commentators and reformers have argued for a new British Bill of Rights to provide liberty, democracy and the rule of law with more effective constitutional protection.

== Criticisms ==
Legal scholar Jeremy Waldron contends that constitutionalism is often undemocratic:

Constitutions are not just about restraining and limiting power; they are about the empowerment of ordinary people in a democracy and allowing them to control the sources of law and harness the apparatus of government to their aspirations. That is the democratic view of constitutions, but it is not the constitutionalist view.... Of course, it is always possible to present an alternative to constitutionalism as an alternative form of constitutionalism: scholars talk of "popular constitutionalism" or "democratic constitutionalism."... But I think it is worth setting out a stark version of the antipathy between constitutionalism and democratic or popular self-government, if only because that will help us to measure more clearly the extent to which a new and mature theory of constitutional law takes proper account of the constitutional burden of ensuring that the people are not disenfranchised by the very document that is supposed to give them their power.

Libertarian political theorist Murray Rothbard criticized constitutionalism as being incapable of restraining governments and not protecting the rights of citizens from their governments:

It is true that, in the United States, at least, we have a constitution that imposes strict limits on some powers of government. But, as we have discovered in the past century, no constitution can interpret or enforce itself; it must be interpreted by men. And if the ultimate power to interpret a constitution is given to the government's own Supreme Court, then the inevitable tendency is for the Court to continue to place its imprimatur on ever-broader powers for its own government. Furthermore, the highly touted "checks and balances" and "separation of powers" in the American government are flimsy indeed, since in the final analysis all of these divisions are part of the same government and are governed by the same set of rulers.

== Constitutionalism by nations ==
Used descriptively, the concept of constitutionalism can refer chiefly to the historical struggle for constitutional recognition of the people's right to "consent" and certain other rights, freedoms, and privileges. On the other hand, the prescriptive approach to constitutionalism addresses what a constitution should be. Two observations might be offered about its prescriptive use:

Observation 1 (Assumption of constitutionalism)
There is often confusion in equating the presence of a written constitution with the conclusion that a state or polity is one based upon constitutionalism. As noted by David Fellman, constitutionalism "should not be taken to mean that if a state has a constitution, it is necessarily committed to the idea of constitutionalism. In a very real sense... every state may be said to have a constitution, since every state has institutions which are at the very least expected to be permanent, and every state has established ways of doing things". But even with a "formal written document labelled 'constitution' which includes the provisions customarily found in such a document, it does not follow that it is committed to constitutionalism...."
Observation 2 (Use of the word in rhetoric)
Often the word "constitutionalism" is used in a rhetorical sense, as a political argument that equates the views of the speaker or writer with a preferred view of the constitution. For instance, University of Maryland Constitutional History Professor Herman Belz's critical assessment of expansive constitutional construction notes that "constitutionalism... ought to be recognized as a distinctive ideology and approach to political life.... Constitutionalism not only establishes the institutional and intellectual framework, but it also supplies much of the rhetorical currency with which political transactions are carried on." Similarly, Georgetown University Law Center Professor Louis Michael Seidman noted as well the confluence of political rhetoric with arguments supposedly rooted in constitutionalism. In assessing the "meaning that critical scholars attributed to constitutional law in the late twentieth century," Professor Seidman notes a "new order... characterized most prominently by extremely aggressive use of legal argument and rhetoric" and as a result "powerful legal actors are willing to advance arguments previously thought out-of-bounds. They have, in short, used legal reasoning to do exactly what crits claim legal reasoning always does—put the lipstick of disinterested constitutionalism on the pig of raw politics."

=== United States ===
==== Descriptive ====
Constitutionalism of the United States has been defined as a complex of ideas, attitudes and patterns elaborating the principle that the authority of government derives from the people, and is limited by a body of fundamental law. These ideas, attitudes and patterns, according to one analyst, derive from "a dynamic political and historical process rather than from a static body of thought laid down in the eighteenth century".

In U.S. history, constitutionalism, in both its descriptive and prescriptive sense, has traditionally focused on the federal constitution. Indeed, a routine assumption of many scholars has been that understanding "American constitutionalism" necessarily entails the thought that went into the drafting of the federal constitution and the American experience with that constitution since its ratification in 1789.

There is a rich tradition of state constitutionalism that offers broader insight into constitutionalism in the United States. While state constitutions and the federal constitution operate differently as a function of federalism from the coexistence and interplay of governments at both a national and state level, they all rest on a shared assumption that their legitimacy comes from the sovereign authority of the people or popular sovereignty. This underlying premise, embraced by the American revolutionaries with the Declaration of Independence unites American constitutional tradition.

Both experience with state constitutions before and after the federal constitution as well as the emergence and operation of the latter reflect an ongoing struggle over the idea that all governments in America rested on the sovereignty of the people for their legitimacy.

==== Prescriptive ====
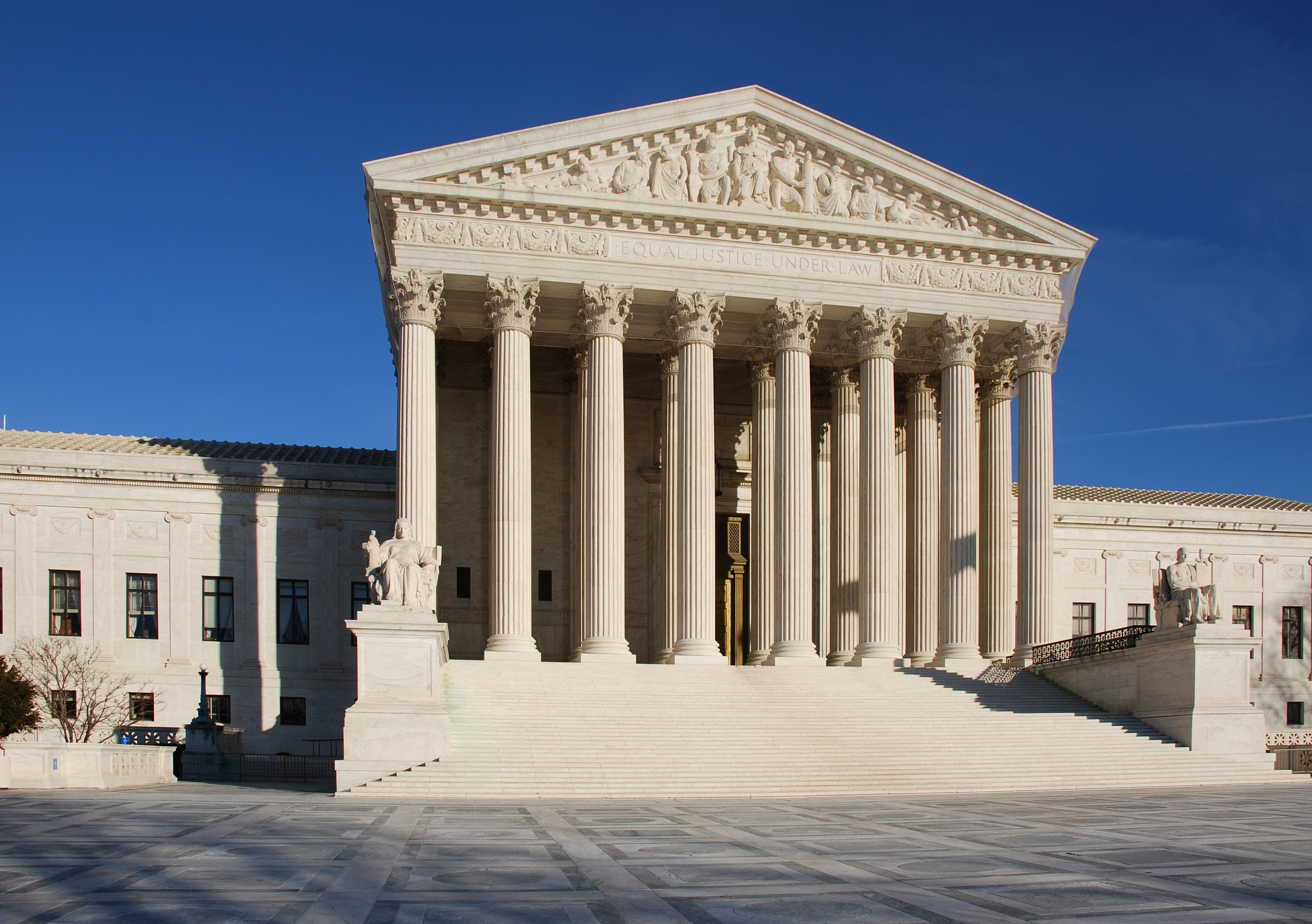
Supreme Court of the United States

Starting with the proposition that "'Constitutionalism' refers to the position or practice that government be limited by a constitution, usually written," analysts take a variety of positions on what the constitution means. For instance, they describe the document as a document that may specify its relation to statutes, treaties, executive and judicial actions, and the constitutions or laws of regional jurisdictions. This prescriptive use of Constitutionalism is also concerned with the principles of constitutional design, which includes the principle that the field of public action be partitioned between delegated powers to the government and the rights of individuals, each of which is a restriction of the other, and that no powers be delegated that are beyond the competence of government.

Two notable Chief Justices of the United States who played an important role in the development of American constitutionalism are John Marshall and Earl Warren. John Marshall, the 4th Chief Justice, upheld the principle of judicial review in the 1803 landmark case Marbury v. Madison, whereby Supreme Court could strike down federal and state laws if they conflicted with the Constitution. By establishing the principle of judicial review, Marshall Court helped implement the ideology of separation of powers and cement the position of the American judiciary as an independent and co-equal branch of government. On the other hand, Earl Warren, the 14th Chief Justice, greatly extended civil rights and civil liberties of all Americans through a series of landmark rulings. The Warren Court started a liberal Constitutional Revolution by bringing "one man, one vote" to the United States, tearing apart racial segregation and state laws banning interracial marriage, extending the coverage of Bill of Rights, providing defendants' rights to an attorney and to silence (Miranda warning), and so on.

=== United Kingdom ===
==== Descriptive ====
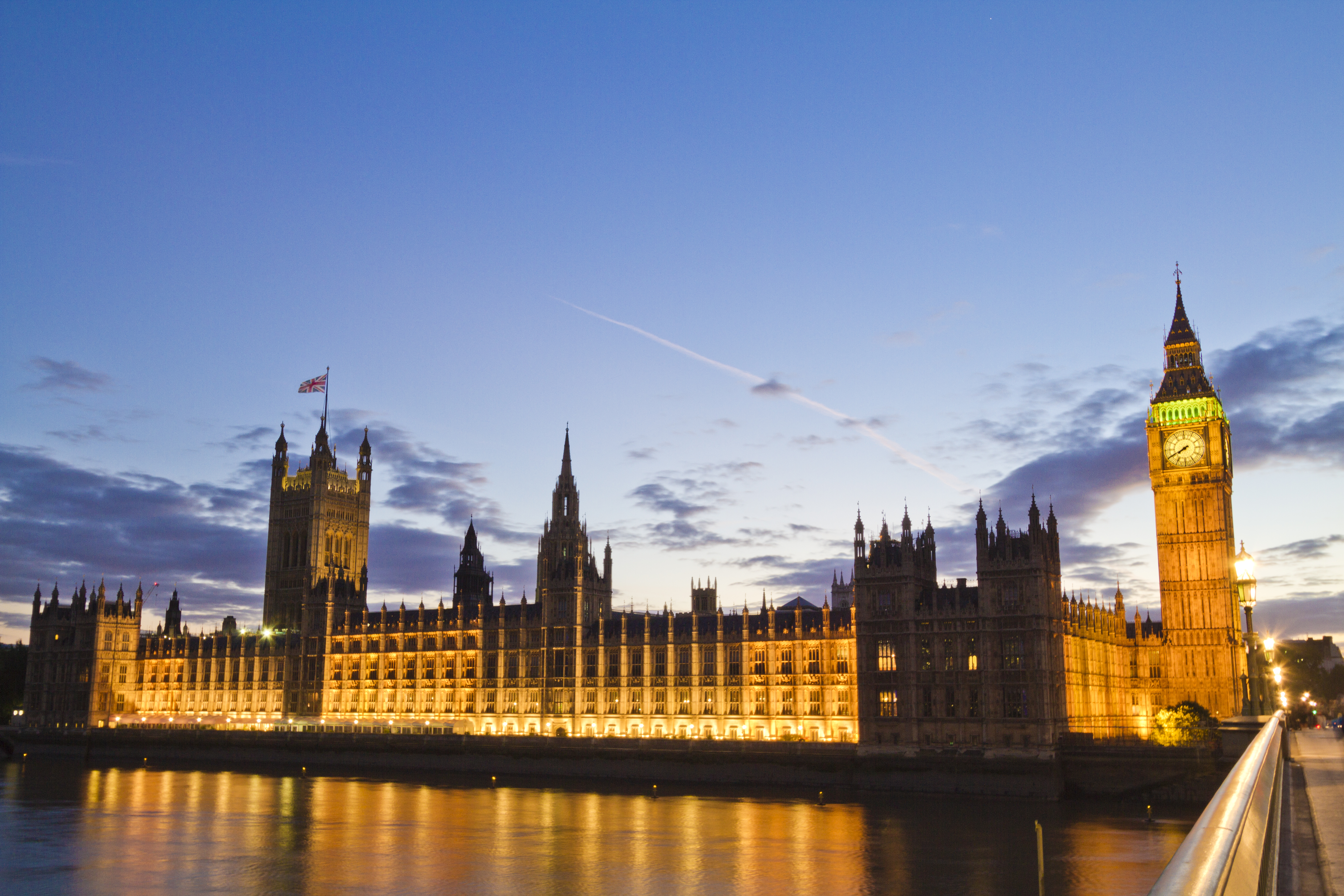
Parliament of the United Kingdom

The United Kingdom is perhaps the best instance of constitutionalism in a country that has an uncodified constitution. A variety of developments in 17th century England, including the Constitutional Monarchy and "the protracted struggle for power between King and Parliament was accompanied by an efflorescence of political ideas in which the concept of countervailing powers was clearly defined," led to a well-developed polity with multiple governmental and private institutions that counter the power of the state.

==== Prescriptive ====
Constitutionalist was also a label used by some independent candidates in UK general elections in the early 1920s. Most of the candidates were former Liberal Party members, and many of them joined the Conservative Party soon after being elected. The best known Constitutionalist candidate was Winston Churchill in the 1924 UK general election.

=== Japan ===
Since May 3, 1947, the sovereign state of Japan has maintained a unitary parliamentary constitutional monarchy with an Emperor and an elected legislature called the National Diet.

=== Polish–Lithuanian Commonwealth ===
==== Descriptive ====
From the mid-sixteenth to the late eighteenth century, the Polish–Lithuanian Commonwealth utilized the liberum veto, a form of unanimity voting rule, in its parliamentary deliberations. The "principle of liberum veto played an important role in [the] emergence of the unique Polish form of constitutionalism." This constraint on the powers of the monarch were significant in making the "[r]ule of law, religious tolerance and limited constitutional government... the norm in Poland in times when the rest of Europe was being devastated by religious hatred and despotism."

==== Prescriptive ====
The Constitution of May 3, 1791, which historian Norman Davies calls "the first constitution of its kind in Europe", was in effect for only a year. It was designed to redress longstanding political defects of the Polish–Lithuanian Commonwealth and its traditional system of "Golden Liberty". The Constitution introduced political equality between townspeople and nobility (szlachta) and placed the peasants under the protection of the government, thus mitigating the worst abuses of serfdom.

=== Dominican Republic ===
After the democratically elected government of president Juan Bosch in the Dominican Republic was deposed, the Constitutionalist movement was born in the country. As opposed to said movement, the Anti-constitutionalist movement was also born. Bosch had to depart to Puerto Rico after he was deposed. His first leader was Colonel Rafael Tomás Fernández Domínguez, and he wanted Bosch to come back to power once again. Colonel Fernández Domínguez was exiled to Puerto Rico where Bosch was. The Constitutionalists had a new leader: Colonel Francisco Alberto Caamaño Deñó.

=== Islamic states ===
The scope and limits of constitutionalism in Muslim countries have attracted growing interest in recent years. Authors such as Ann E. Mayer define Islamic constitutionalism as "constitutionalism that is in some form based on Islamic principles, as opposed to constitutionalism that has developed in countries that happen to be Muslim but that has not been informed by distinctively Islamic principles". However, the concrete meaning of the notion remains contested among Muslim as well as Western scholars. Influential thinkers like Mohammad Hashim Kamali and Khaled Abou El Fadl, but also younger ones like Asifa Quraishi and Nadirsyah Hosen combine classic Islamic law with modern constitutionalism. The constitutional changes initiated by the Arab Spring movement have already brought into reality many new hybrid models of Islamic constitutionalism.

== See also ==
- Classical liberalism
- Constitutional liberalism
- Constitution Party (disambiguation)
- Constitutional law
- Constitutionalism in the United States
- Digital constitutionalism
- Judicial interpretation
- Libertarianism
- Natural and legal rights
- Philosophy of law
- Rule according to higher law
- Rule of law
- Separation of powers
- Social contract
