= Besakih Temple =

Major Hindu temple in Bali, Indonesia

Pura Besakih
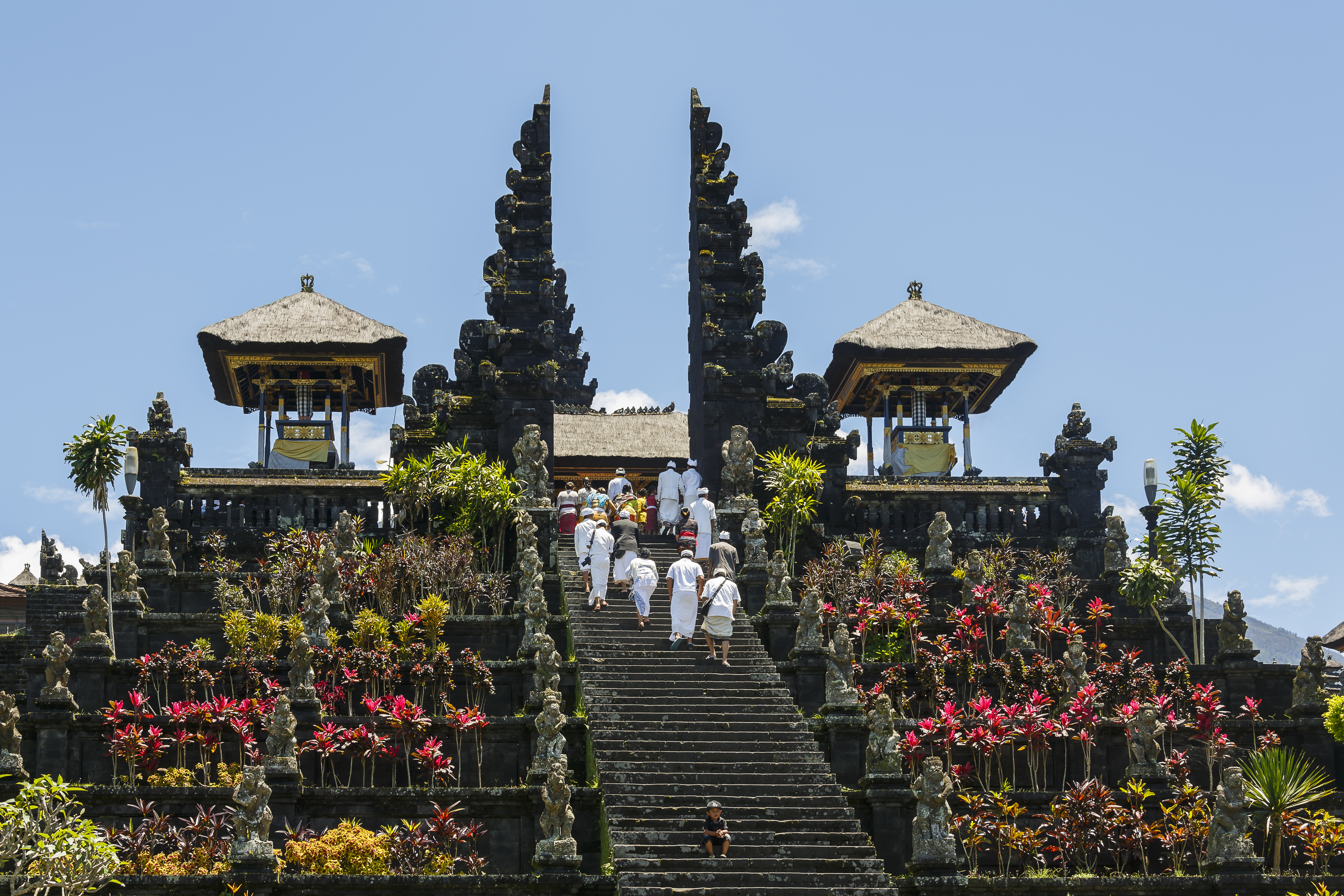
- Pura Besakih, the holiest of all Balinese Hindu temples.

- Location within Bali Location within Indonesia

General information
- Type: Pura
- Architectural style: Balinese
- Location: Besakih, Karangasem, Bali, Indonesia, Besakih, Rendang, Karangasem Regency, Bali 80863
- Coordinates: 8°22′28″S 115°27′03″E
- Estimated completion: 15th-century

Website
- www.besakihbali.com

Besakih Temple (Balinese: ᬧᬸᬭᬩᭂᬲᬓᬶᬄ) is a pura Hindu temple in the village of Besakih on the slopes of Mount Agung in eastern Bali, Indonesia. It is the most important, largest, and holiest temple of Balinese Hinduism, and one of a series of Balinese temples. Perched nearly 1,000 meters up the side of Gunung Agung, it is not a single structure but an extensive complex of 23 separate but related temples, with the largest and most important being Pura Penataran Agung. The temple is built on six levels, terraced up the slope. The entrance is marked by a candi bentar (split gateway), and beyond it, the Kori Agung is the gateway to the second courtyard.

== History ==
The precise origins of the temple are unclear but its importance as a holy site almost certainly dates from prehistoric times. The stone bases of Pura Penataran Agung and several other temples resemble megalithic stepped pyramids, which date back at least 2,000 years.

It was certainly used as a Hindu place of worship from 1284 when the first Javanese conquerors settled in Bali. By the 15th century, Besakih had become a state temple of the powerful Gelgel dynasty.

== Location ==
The temple is on the slopes of Mount Agung, the principal volcano of Bali.

== Architecture ==
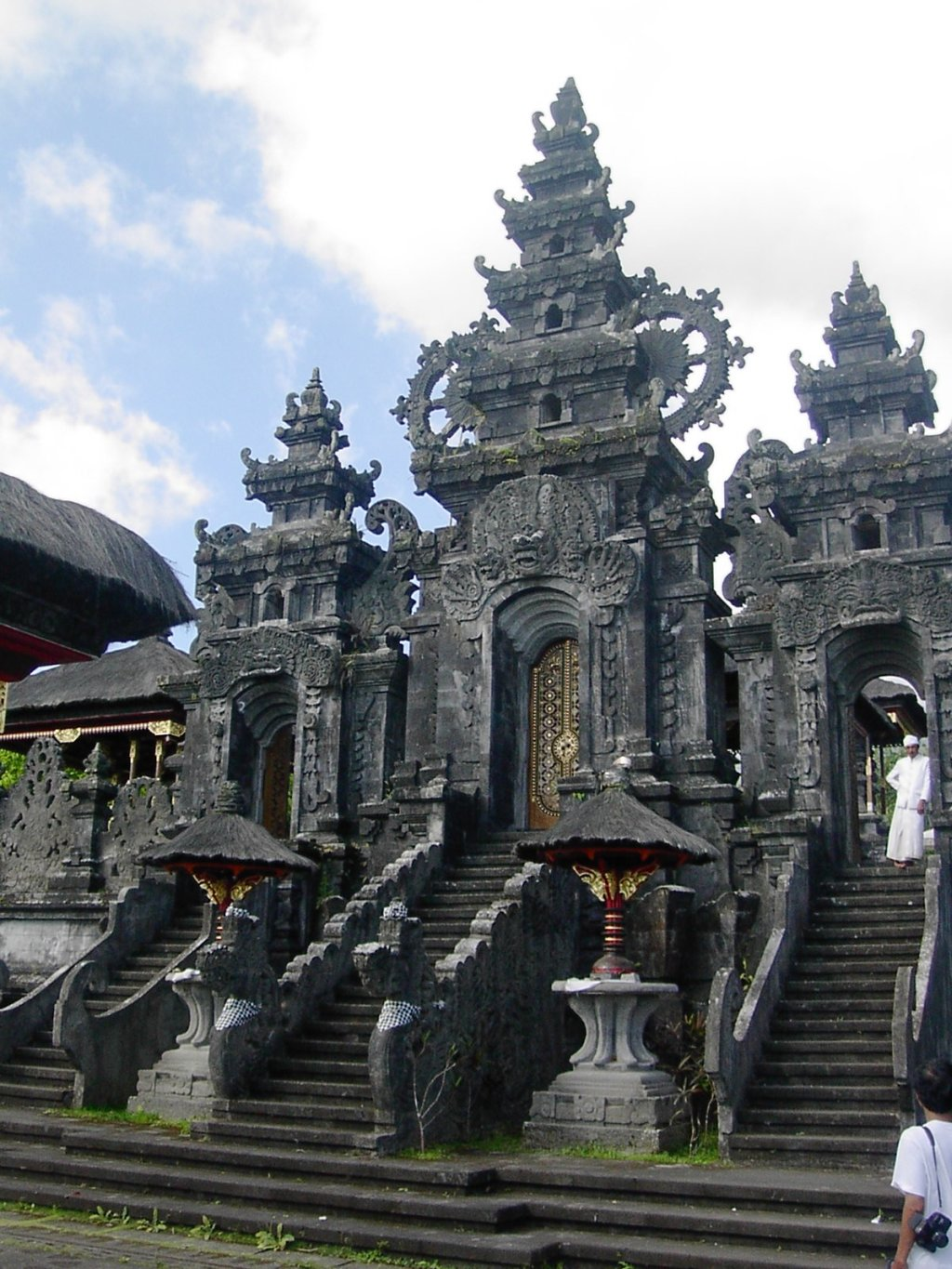
Portal of the main temple of the Besakih temple complex

Pura Besakih is a complex made up of 23 temples that sit on parallel ridges. It has stepped terraces and flights of stairs that ascend to several courtyards and brick gateways that lead up to the main spire or Meru structure, which is called Pura Penataran Agung. All this is aligned along a single axis and designed to lead the spiritual person upward and closer to the mountain which is considered sacred.

The main sanctuary of the complex is the Pura Penataran Agung. The symbolic center of the main sanctuary is the lotus throne, or padmasana, which is therefore the ritual focus of the entire complex. It dates to around the seventeenth century.

A series of eruptions of Mount Agung in 1963, which killed approximately 1,700 people also threatened Pura Besakih. The lava flows missed the temple complex by mere meters. The Balinese people regarded the saving of the temple as miraculous, and a signal from the gods that they wished to demonstrate their power but not destroy the monument the Balinese faithful had erected.

== Festivals ==
Each year, there are at least 70 festivals held at the complex since almost every shrine celebrates a yearly anniversary. This cycle is based on the 210-day Balinese Pawukon calendar year.

It had been nominated as a World Heritage Site as early as 1995 but was pulled out in 2015.

== Visitors ==
In 2013, foreign visitors accounted for 84,368 persons (77.2% of all visitors), while domestic visitors accounted for 24,853 persons (22.8%).

== Problem ==
Illegal levies carried out by batur or youth from villages around the temple have long been a problem for tourists who want to visit this temple. At the temple entrance, visitors are charged an official entrance ticket fee of Rp. 60 thousand for foreign tourists and Rp. 40,000 for domestic tourists/per person and IDR 5 thousand for four-wheeled vehicles. However, when passing a post, visitors were again asked for money. The reason is as money for cleaning and guiding services. Usually foreign tourists are asked for an additional fee of 50 US dollars, while local tourists are asked for 200,000 rupiah. This is an illegal levy, and tourists are advised to resist this extortion. Complaints have emerged and this act of extortion has tarnished Bali's tourism image, but local authorities have not taken any action to stop it. Later it was discovered that this problem has decreased slightly due to increased supervision from local security authorities.

== Maintenance efforts ==
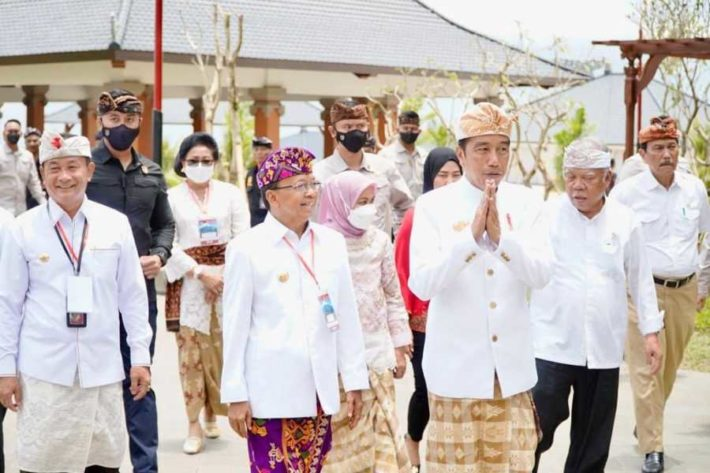
Governor of Bali I Wayan Koster accompanied President of Indonesia Joko Widodo to inaugurate the sacred area facilities at Besakih Temple.

On 13 March 2023, President of Indonesia Joko Widodo inaugurated the arrangement of facilities for the sacred area of Pura Agung Besakih in Karangasem Regency, Bali Province. In his speech, President Jokowi emphasized the importance of caring for Pura Agung Besakih which is very sacred to Hindus, not only Hindus in Bali, but throughout the archipelago.

"We must protect this holy temple, we must maintain it with full respect so that Hindus and visitors who come to Pura Agung Besakih can feel its aura of holiness, because by maintaining its purity, it maintains cleanliness, it maintains tidiness and at the same time it becomes a beautiful place," said the President. Jokowi.

Apart from that, Pura Agung Besakih is always packed with visitors, especially if there is a big ceremony, especially the Bhatara Turun Kabeh Ceremony which is held every sasih kadasa. The President believes that the arrival of more and more people and visitors without being balanced with arrangements and anticipation for the future will cause chaos and discomfort.

== Gallery ==
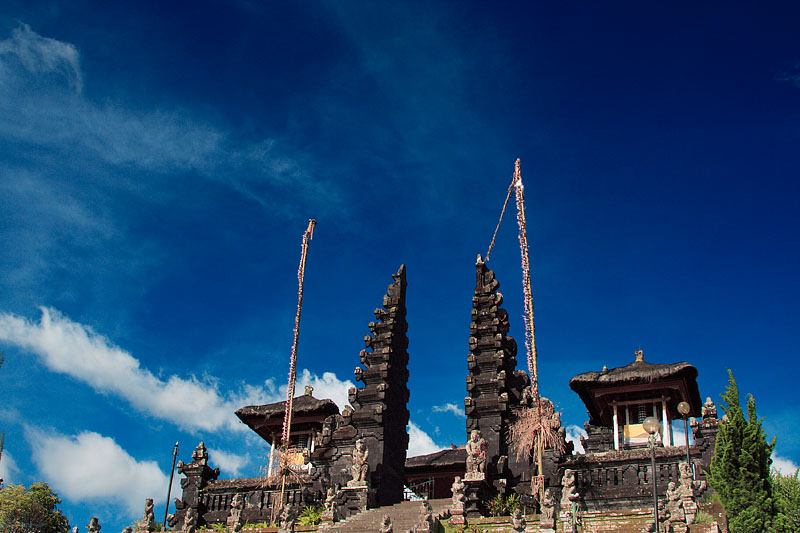
The main temple of Besakih

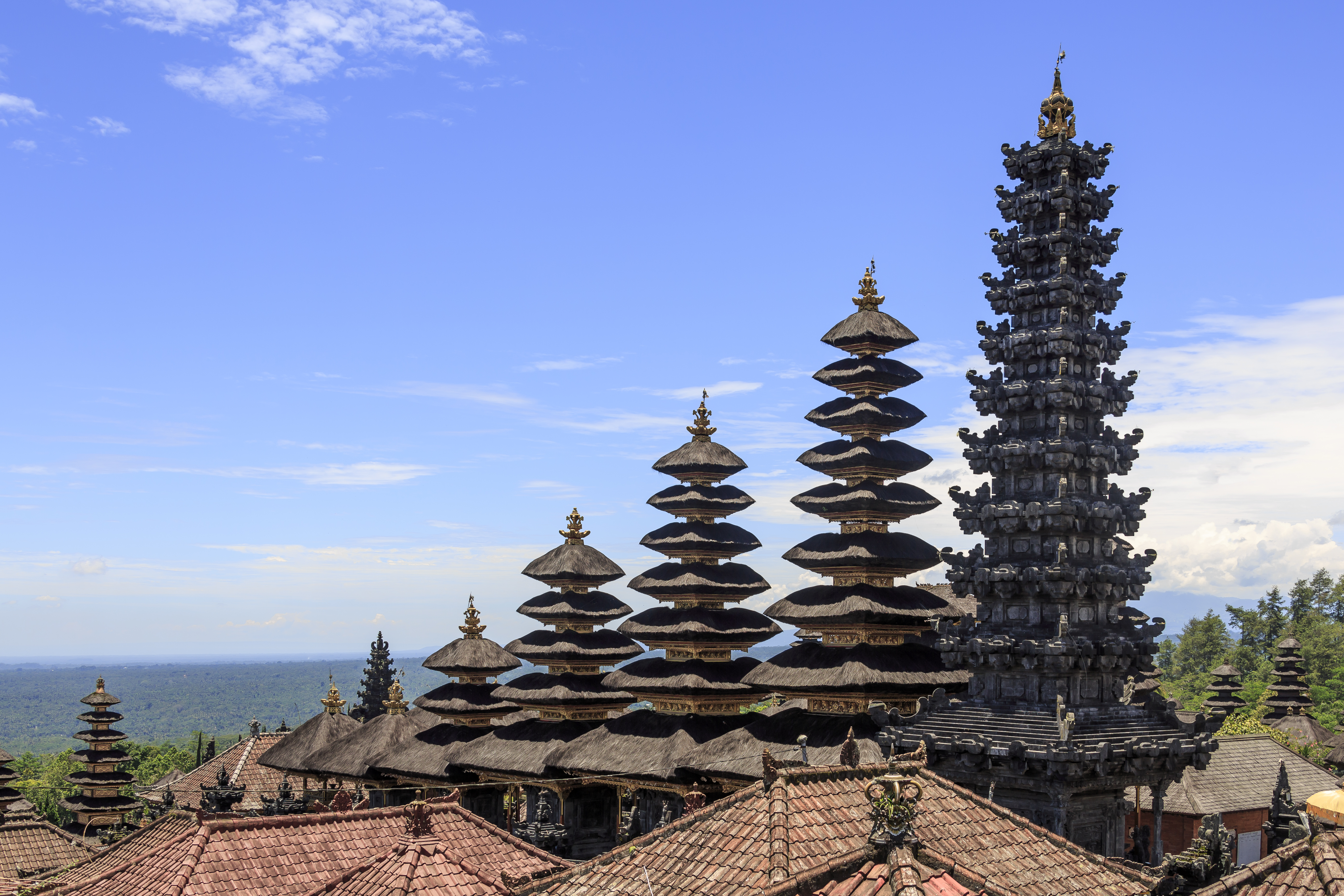
Meru towers of Pura Besakih

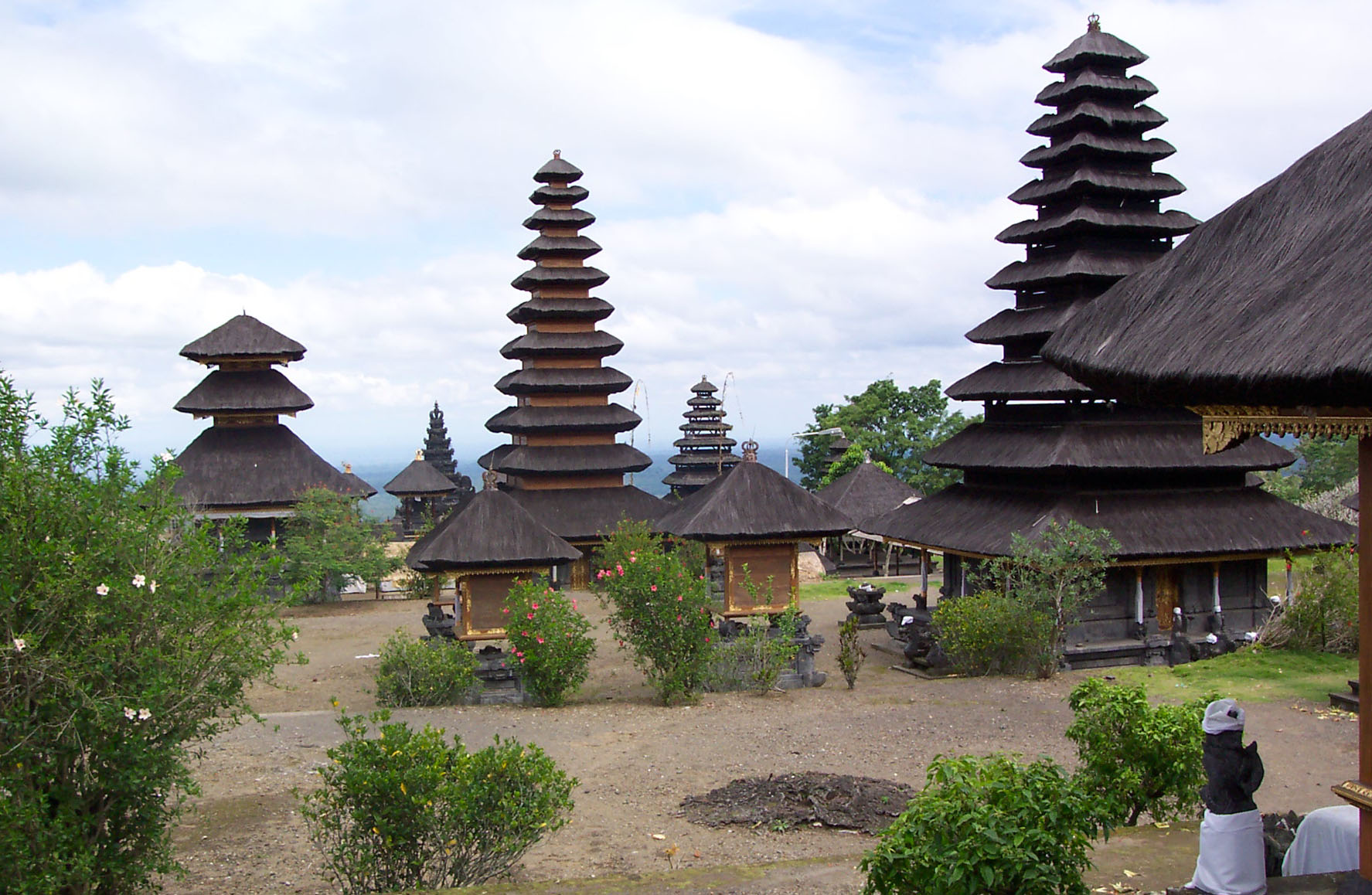
Pura Besakih

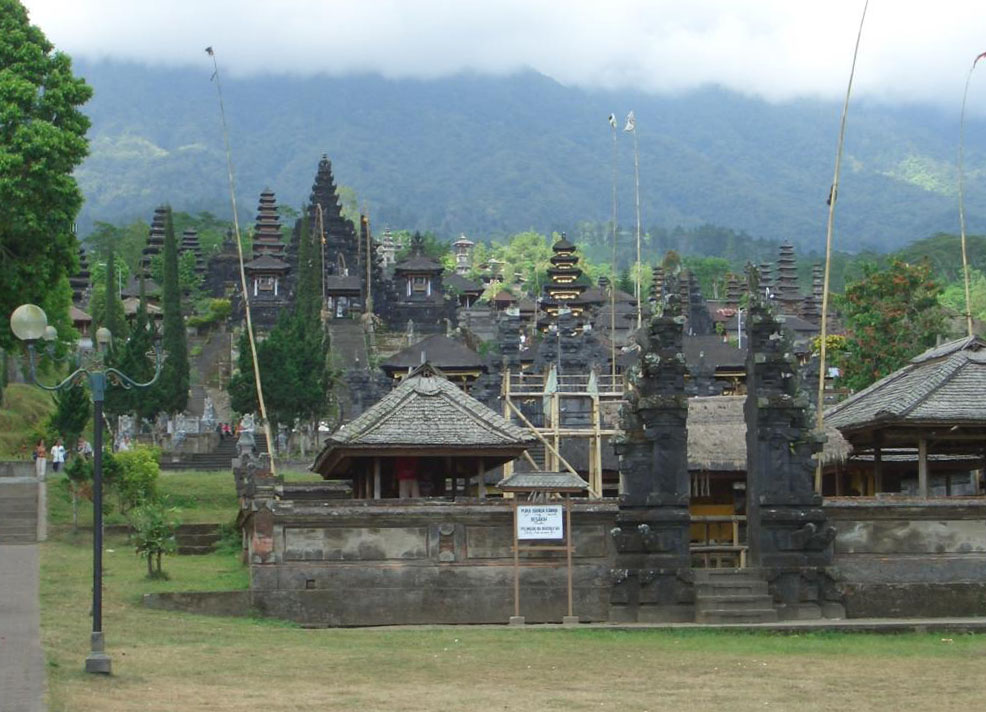
Pura Besakih

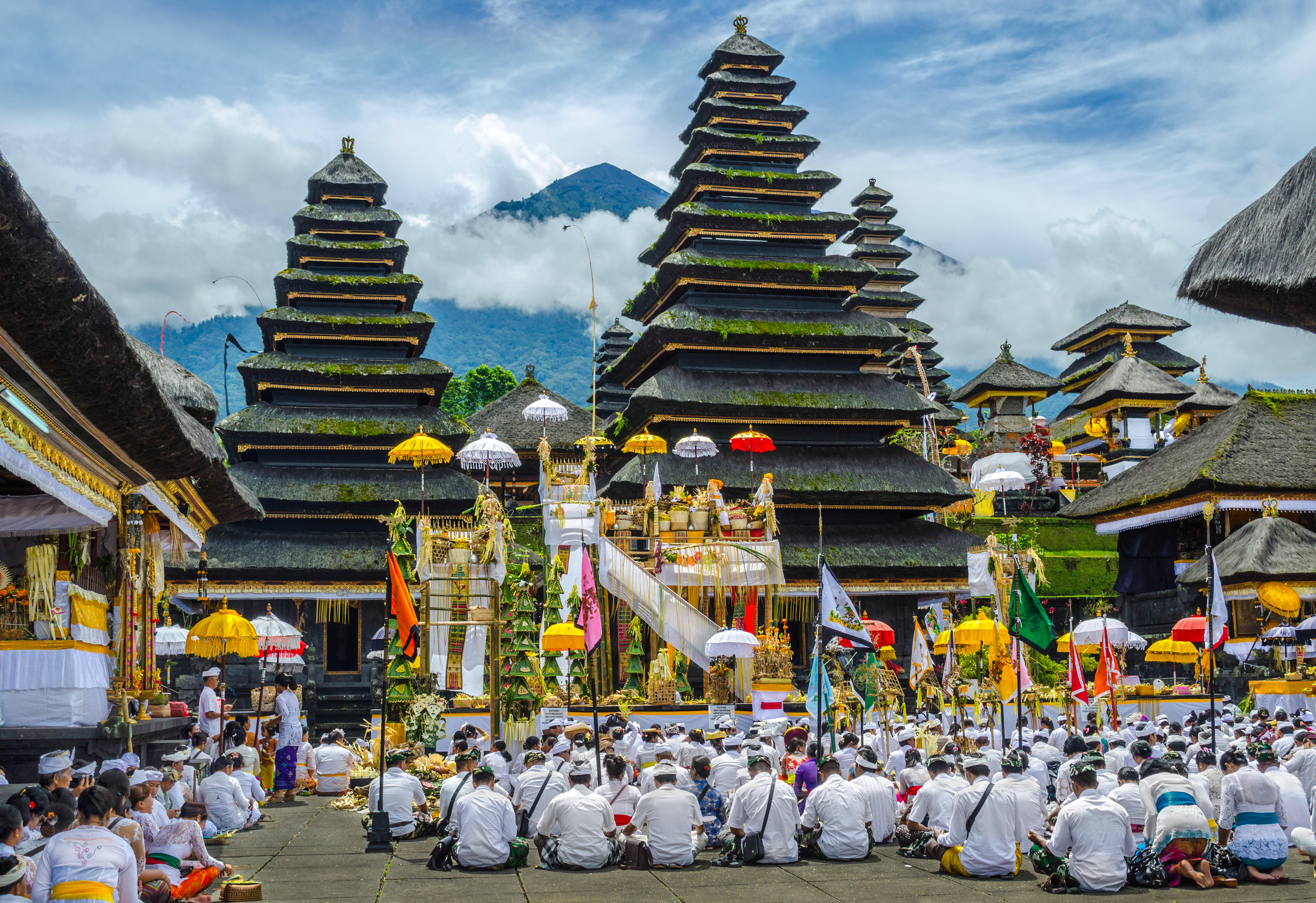
A puja ceremony at the Besakih Temple

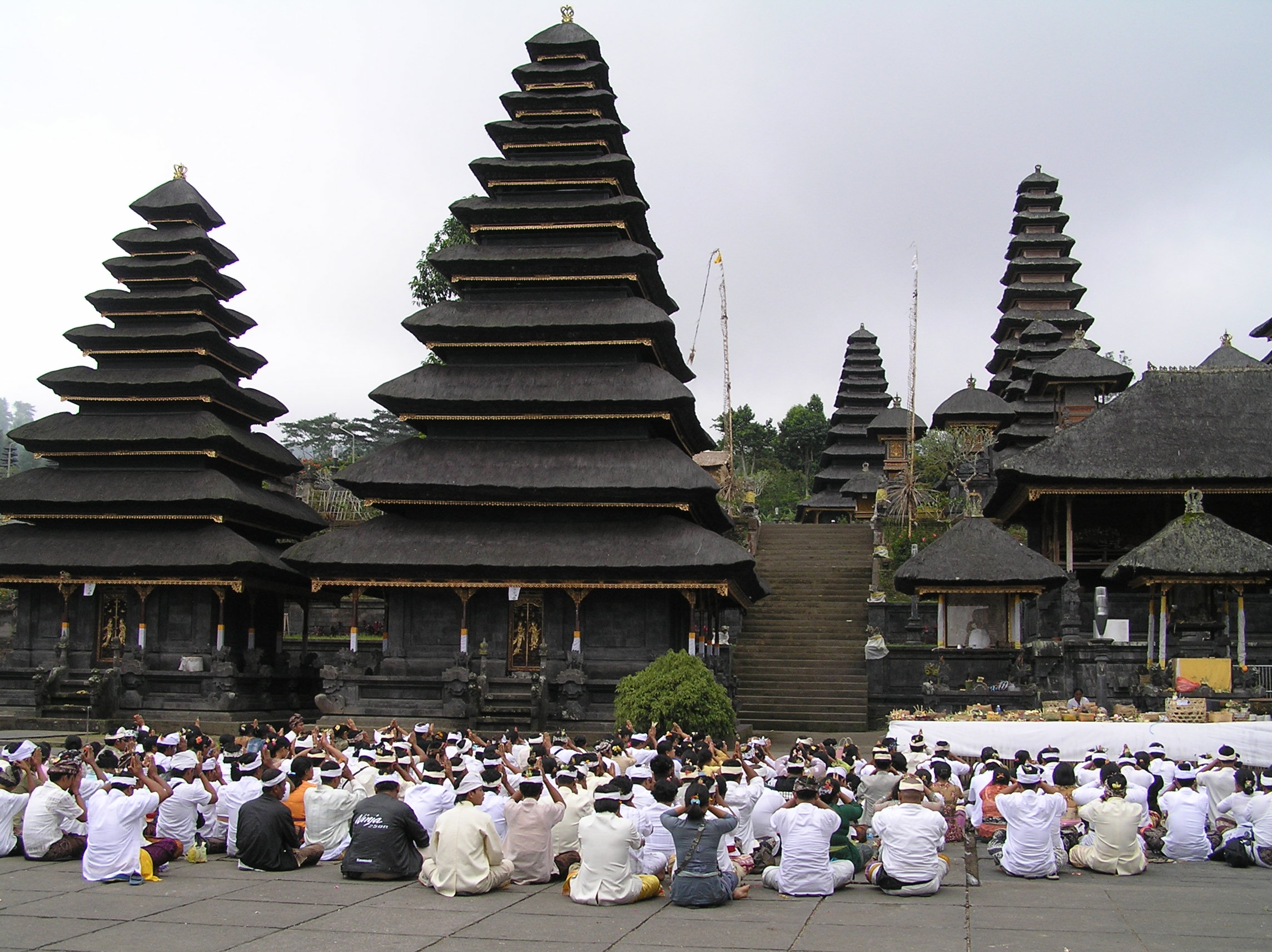
A prayer ceremony at Besakih Temple

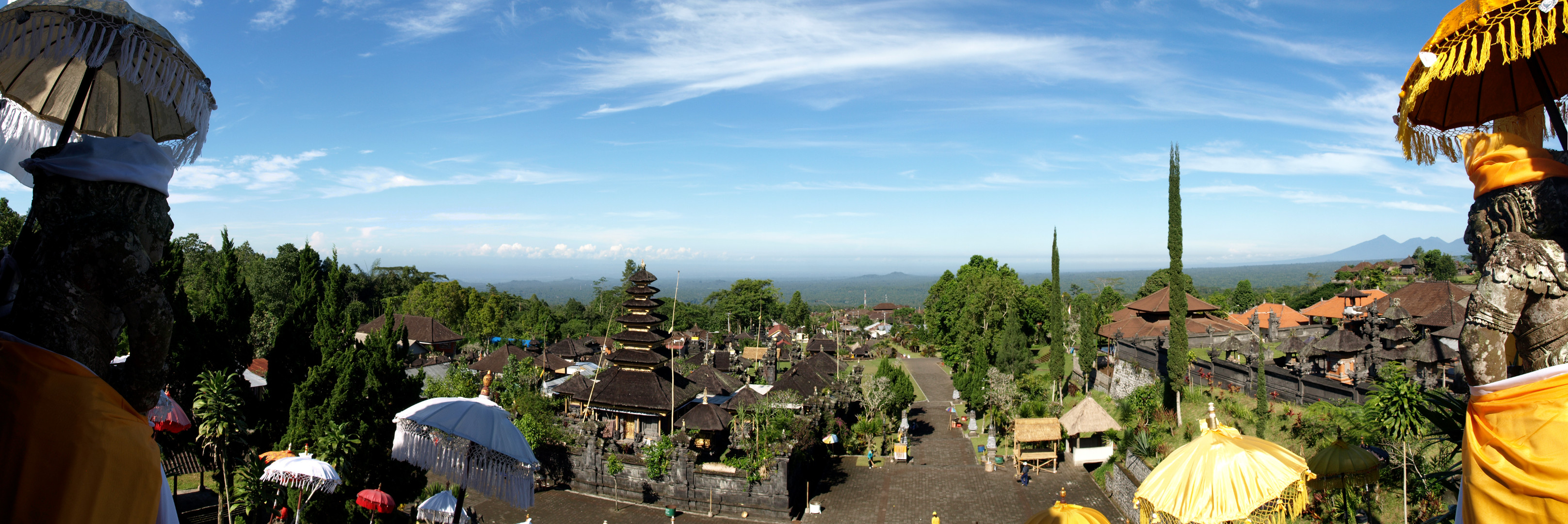
Bali view from Besakih/Mother Temple's main gate

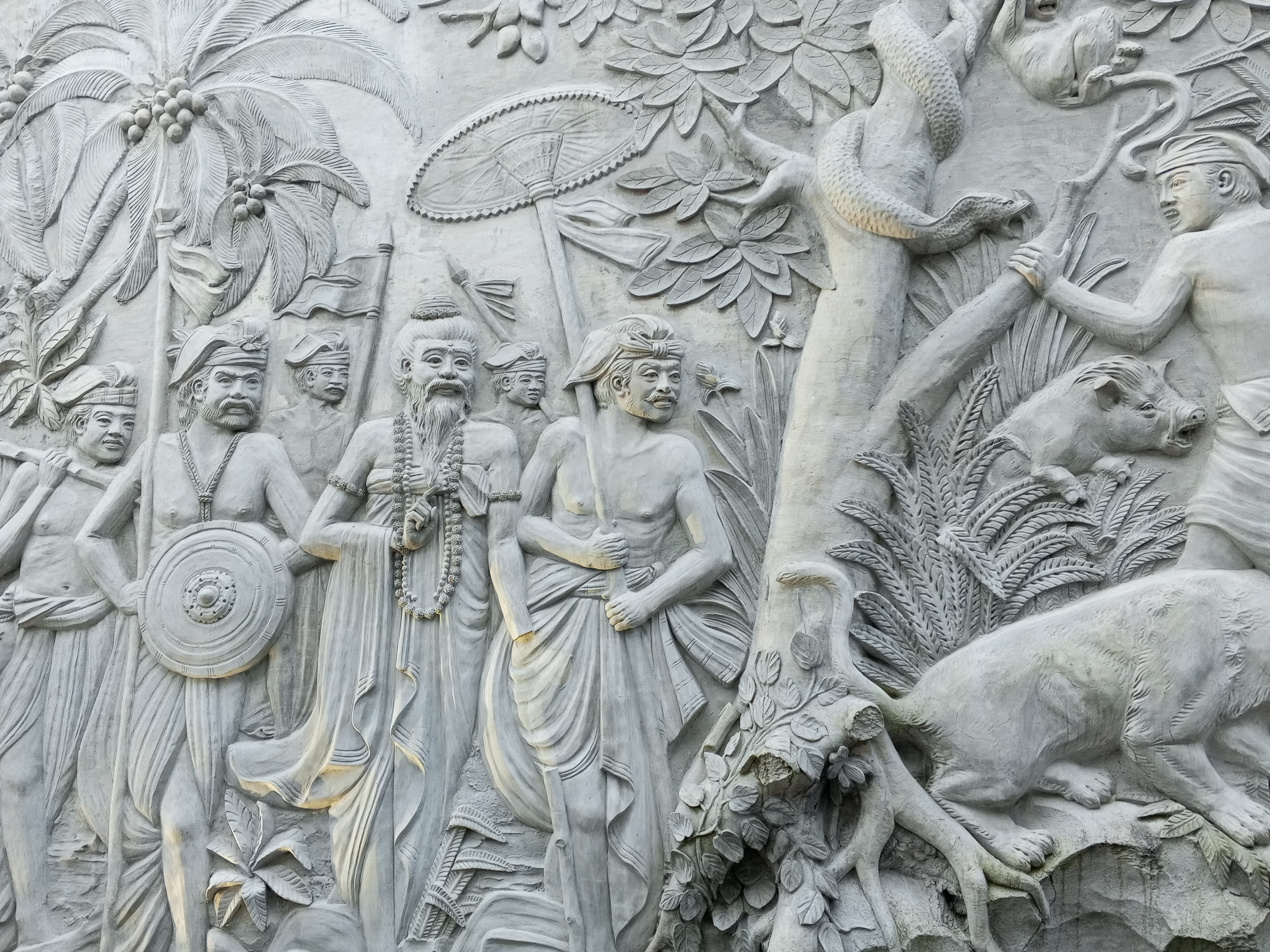
Relief carvings at Besakih Temple

== See also ==
- Indonesian architecture
- Balinese Hinduism
