= Christian democracy (disambiguation) =

Christian democracy is a political ideology that seeks to apply Christian principles to public policy. It is also the name of several political parties:

== Italy ==
- Christian Democracy (Italy), 1943–1994
- Rebirth of Christian Democracy, 1997–2012
- Christian Democratic Party (Italy), 2000–2013
- Christian Democracy (Italy, 2002), 2002–present
- Christian Democracy (Italy, 2004), 2004–present
- Christian Democracy for Autonomies, 2005–2009
- Christian Democracy (Italy, 2012), 2012–present
- Christian Democracy Sicily, 2020–present
- Christian Democracy with Rotondi, 2023–present
- Christian Democracy (Italy, 2023), 2023–present

== Other countries ==
- Belarusian Christian Democracy
- Christian Democracy (Brazil)
- Christian Democracy (Greece)
- Christian Democracy (Poland)
- Christian Democracy of the Third Polish Republic (Poland)
- Federalist Christian Democracy – Convention of Federalists for Christian Democracy (Congo)
- Lithuanian Christian Democracy Party
- Christian Democratic Party (Peru), previously known as Christian Democracy

== See also ==
- List of Christian democratic parties
- Partido Demócrata Cristiano (disambiguation)
- Partido Democrata Cristão (disambiguation)
