= 2017–2019 eruptions of Mount Agung =

Major volcanic eruptions in Bali, Indonesia

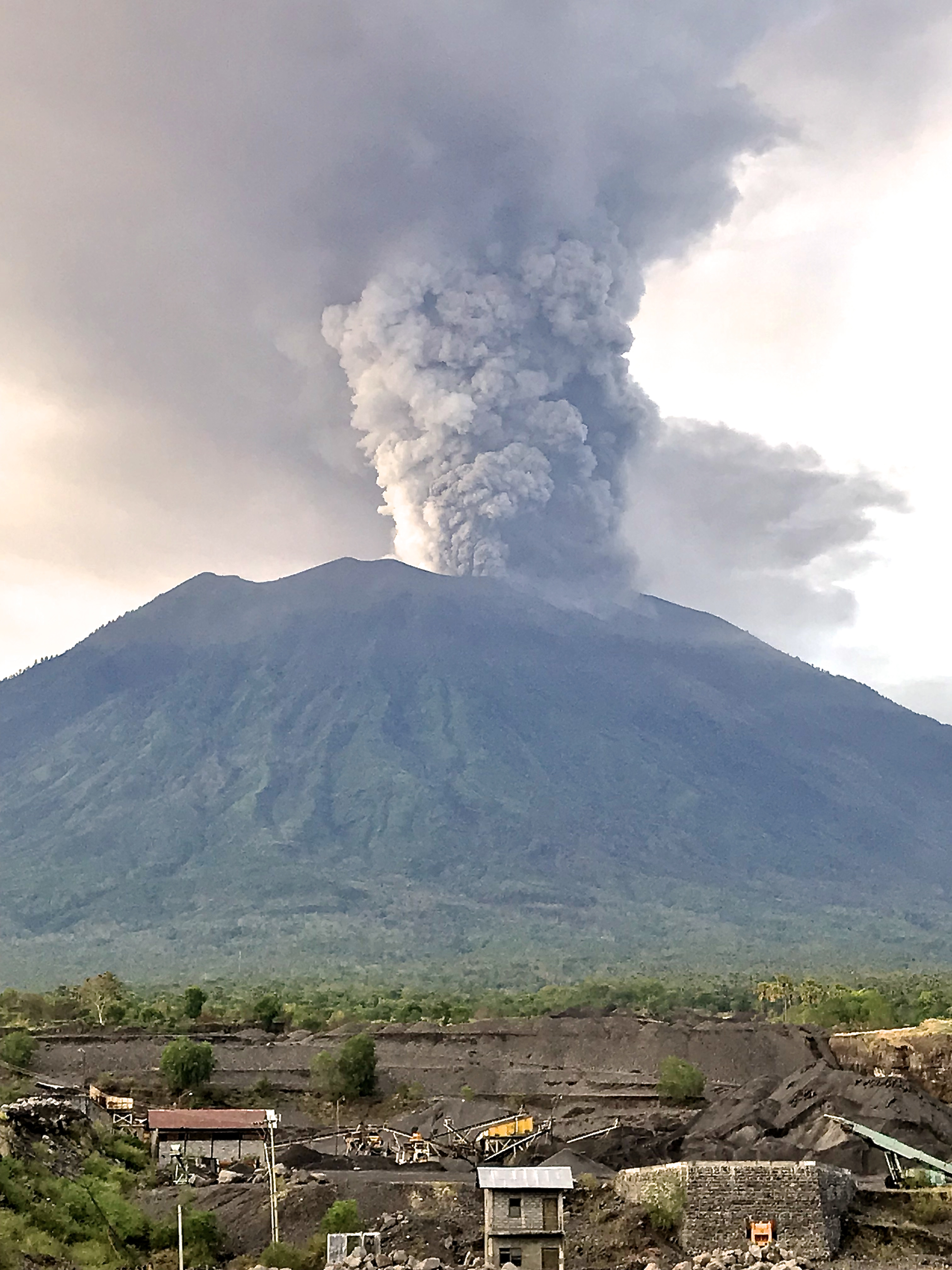
- Mount Agung on 27 November 2017
- Volcano: Mount Agung
- Start date: 21 November 2017
- End date: 12 June 2019
- Type: Vulcanian/Sub-plinian
- Location: Bali, Indonesia; 8°20′35″S 115°30′25″E
- VEI: 3

Location of Mount Agung, Bali

Mount Agung, a volcano on the island of Bali in Indonesia, erupted five times in late November 2017, causing thousands to evacuate, disrupting air travel and causing environmental damage. As of 27 November 2017, the alert level was at its highest and evacuation orders were in place.

Tectonic earthquakes from the volcano had been detected since early August 2017, and volcanic activity intensified for several weeks before decreasing significantly in late October. A second, more violent period of major activity began in late November. Agung has since had eruptions in January, June, July and December 2018 and January, February, March, April, May and June 2019.

== Background ==
=== 1843 eruption ===
Agung erupted in 1843 as reported by Heinrich Zollinger:

After having been dormant for a long time, this year the mountain began to be alive again. In the first days of the activity, earthquake shocks were felt followed by the emission of ash, sand and stones.

=== 1963 eruption ===
Mount Agung's 1963 eruption was among the most catastrophic volcanic events in Indonesian history. After initial explosions in the crater on 18 February of that year, lava began flowing down the mountain on 24 February, eventually travelling 7 kilometres (4.3 mi) over the next three weeks. On 17 March, a highly explosive eruption occurred, reaching a VEI (Volcanic Explosivity Index) of 5 and sending lethal pyroclastic flows at high speeds down the mountain's slopes, killing at least 1,500 people. Heavy rainfall mixed with ash from the eruption in the following days caused extensive lahars which killed about 200 more people. A smaller eruption occurred on 16 May, sending pyroclastic flows down the mountain once more, killing about 200 more people. By the time the eruptions ceased in early 1964, they had claimed about 1,900 lives, marking the event as the 8th deadliest volcanic eruption of the 20th century.

Since 1963, the population of Bali has nearly doubled. Mount Agung is therefore considered highly dangerous by Indonesian authorities. This concern was the primary reason behind their decision to evacuate more than 100,000 people in response to the surge in local tectonic activity in the latter half of 2017.

== Major activity in 2017 ==
=== August ===
Volcanic earthquakes were observed from 10 August 2017 and the intensity increased in the following weeks.

=== September ===
On 30 September 2017, an increase of rumbling and seismic activity around the volcano made people raise the alert to the highest level and about 122,500 people were evacuated from their homes around the volcano. The Indonesian National Disaster Management Authority declared a 12-kilometre (7.5 mi) exclusion zone around the volcano on 24 September. A plume was observed on 13 September.

Evacuees gathered in sports halls and other community buildings around Klungkung, Karangasem, Buleleng, and other areas. The monitoring station is in Tembuku, Rendang, Karangasem Regency, where intensity and frequency of tremors were monitored for signs of the imminent large eruption.

The area experienced 844 volcanic earthquakes on 25 September, and 300 to 400 earthquakes by midday on 26 September. Seismologists have been alarmed at the force and frequency of the incidents as it has taken much less for similar volcanoes to erupt.

=== October ===
In late October 2017, the activity of the volcano decreased significantly, leading to lowering of the alert status on 29 October.

The alert level remained at 3 (out of 4) until the start of the second major activity period, and plumes were observed during this time.

=== November ===
==== 21 November ====
A small phreatic eruption was reported at 09:05 on 21 November (UTC), with the top of the ash cloud reaching 3,842 metres (12,605 ft) above sea level. Thousands of people immediately fled the area, and over 29,000 temporary refugees were housed in over 270 locations nearby.

==== 25 November ====
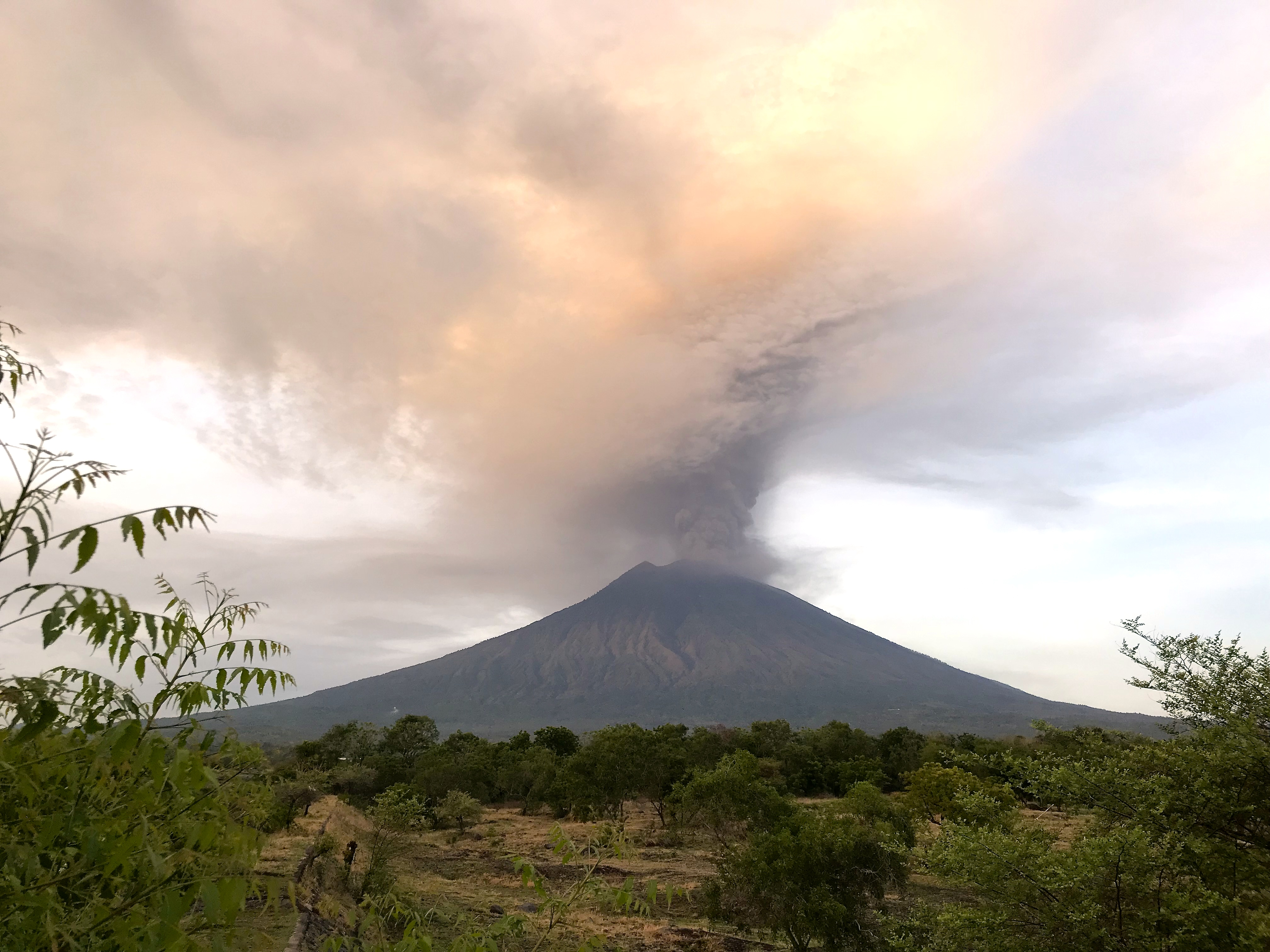
Ash plume from Mount Agung on 27 November 2017

A magmatic eruption began early on Saturday morning, 25 November. The eruption plume rose 1.5–4 kilometres (4,900–13,100 ft; 1,500–4,000 m) above the summit crater, drifting towards the south and dusting the surroundings with a thin layer of dark ash, leading some airlines to cancel flights bound for Australia and New Zealand. An orange glow was later observed around the crater at night, confirming that fresh magma had reached the surface.

==== 26 November ====
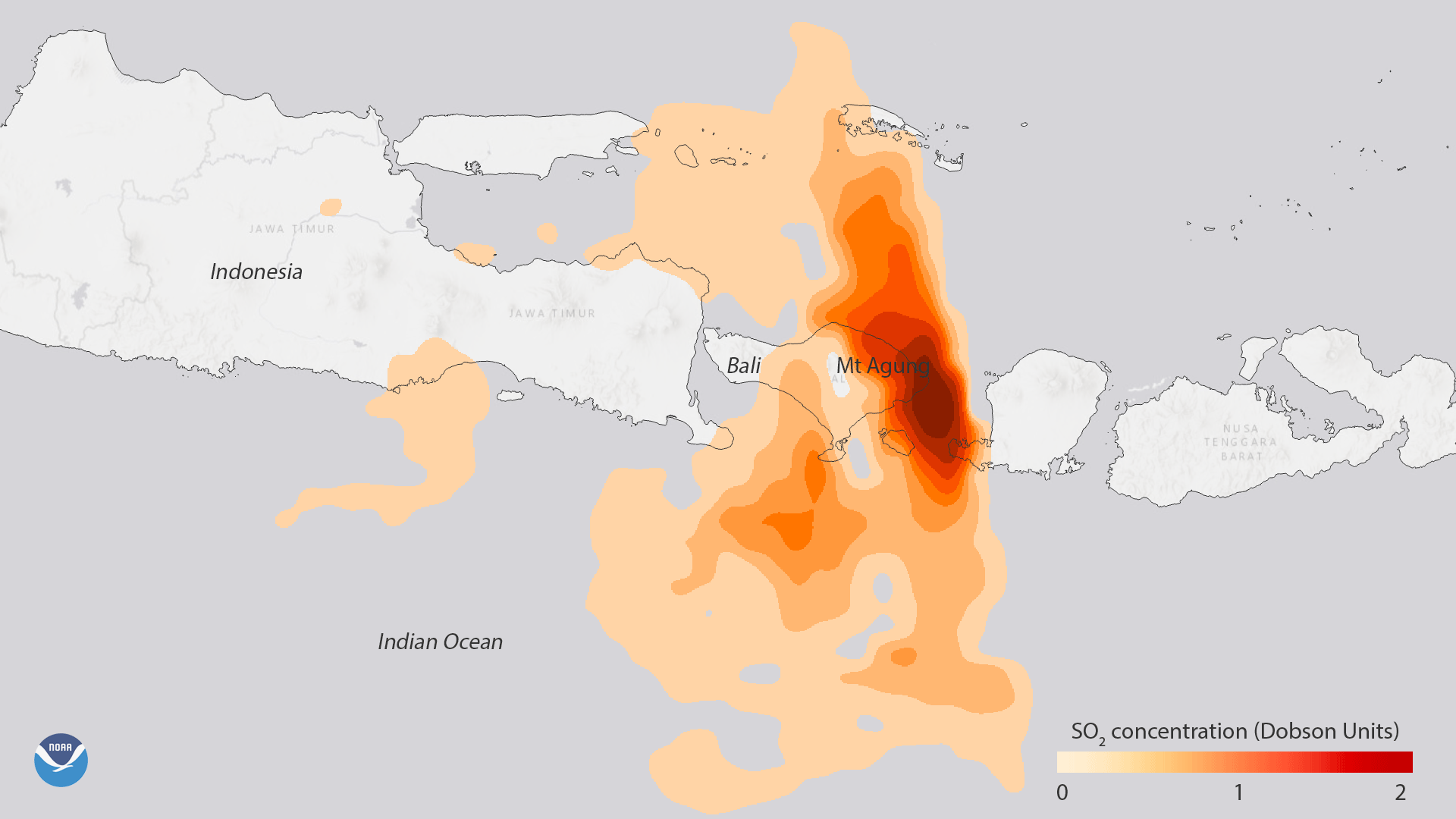
Map sulfur dioxide (SO2) distribution by NASA's Aura satellite after eruption, 27 November 2017

At 23:37 on 26 November (UTC), another eruption occurred. Ngurah Rai International Airport was closed next day, leaving many tourists stranded. More than 100,000 people in a 10-kilometre (6.2 mi) radius of the volcano were ordered to evacuate.

==== 27 November ====
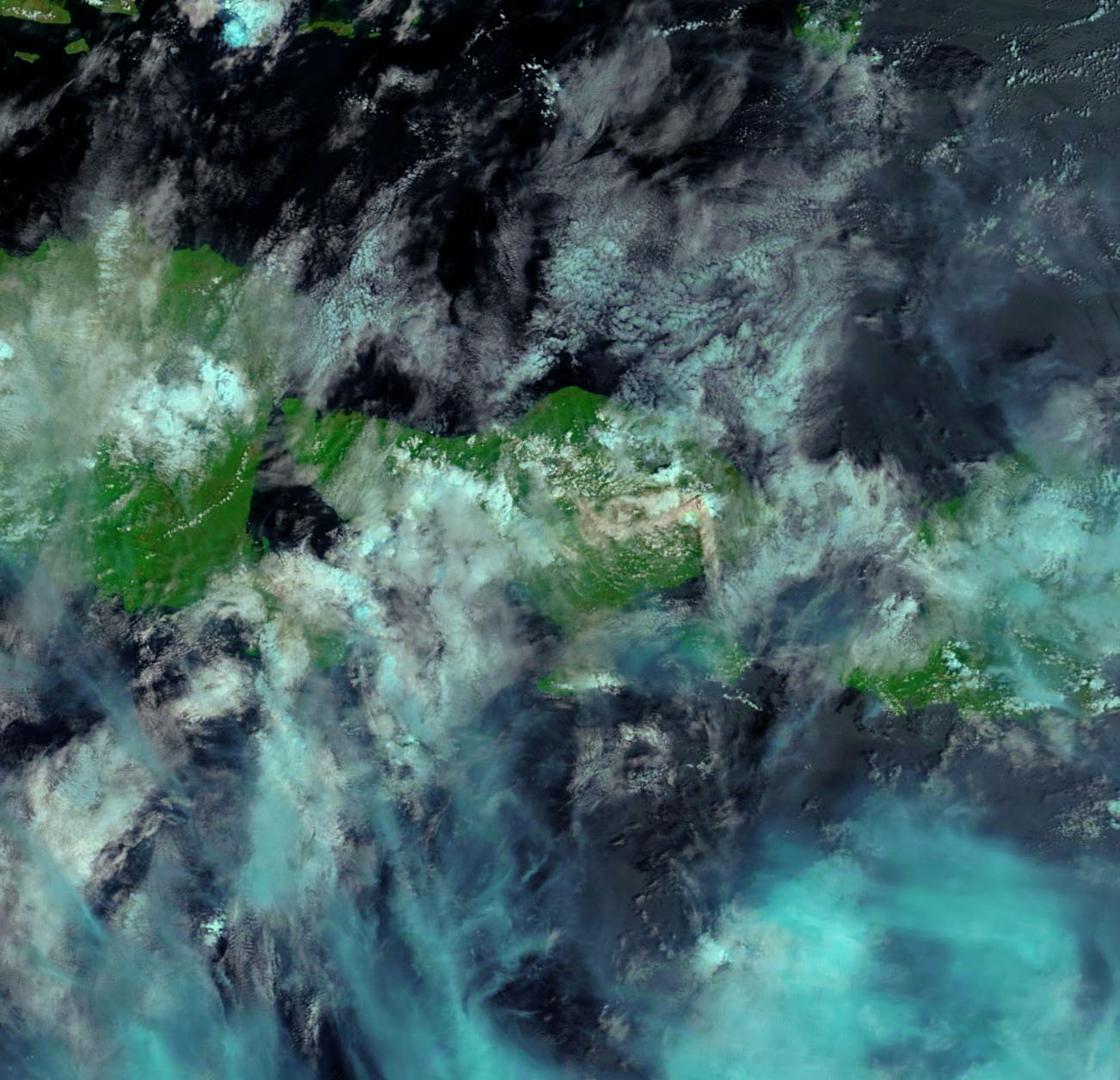
NASA MODIS aerial view of ash from Terra satellite, 29 November 2017

Sunday 26 November's eruption continued at a constant rate, and lahars were reported in the Selat district south of the volcano. The Australian Government's Bureau of Meteorology reported that the top of the eruption column had reached an altitude of 9,144 metres (30,000 ft). Ash continued to spread in a southeasterly direction, and estimates by the Pacific Disaster Center predicted that the resulting atmospheric ash exposure would affect up to 5.6 million people within the densely populated region surrounding the volcano.

==== 29 November ====
Reductions in eruption intensity and wind dispersal of the ash cloud led authorities to reopen Ngurah Rai International Airport at 07:00 (UTC). Authorities also warned that the eruption volume could increase again at any time, potentially shutting down air traffic once more.

== Activity in 2018 ==
=== January ===
The volcano erupted once again on 11 January, sending plumes of smoke and ash, while Indonesia's Bali international airport was declared safe, operating normally. The eruption column was reported to rise `2.5 kilometres (8,200 ft; 2,500 m) above the mountain.

=== June ===
Agung erupted on 12 June, sending plumes of smoke and ash some 2,000 metres (6,600 ft) above the volcano's summit. No flights were affected from the event.

On 28 June, water vapour and volcanic ash emission were detected from Mount Agung up to two kilometres (6,600 ft; 2,000 m) into the air. The Ngurah Rai Airport was closed due to the event.

=== July ===
Agung erupted again 3 July due to a minor strombolian explosion. 700 people living near the crater were evacuated. No flights were affected.

=== December ===
On the morning of 30 December, the volcano sent ash skywards as it erupted for about three minutes, spewing white clouds of smoke and ash more than 700 metres (2,300 ft) into the air. Several villages in Bali were covered in a thin layer of ash, but no smoke or lava was detected coming from the volcano and no evacuation has been ordered.

== Major activity in 2019 ==
=== January ===
Agung erupted on 10 January, producing columns of volcanic ash. The summit of the volcano was covered by thick haze during eruption and thus the height of the ash could not be seen.

=== February ===
On 22 February, volcanic ash plume that rose up to estimated 14,000 feet (4,300 m) altitude or flight level 140

=== March ===
Explosive activity continues on 8 March or the day after Nyepi, with a volcanic ash plume that rose up to estimated 12,000 feet (3,700 m) altitude or flight level 120 and is moving at 10 knots (19 km/h; 12 mph) in south east direction.

Mt. Agung erupted again on 28 March. Bali's I Gusti Ngurah Rai International Airport operated normally despite the eruption, as the airspace above the airport was declared clear of volcanic ash based on a paper test.

=== April ===
A 2,000-metre-high (6,600 ft) high column of ash erupted out of Agung on 3 April 2019. The Center for Volcanology and Geological Hazard Mitigation (PVMBG) maintained the volcano's alert level at "stay on alert", the third level of the four-tiered alert system. The center also set the danger zone at a 4-kilometre (2.5 mi) radius from the crater.

=== May ===
In late May 2019 an eruption spewed lava and rocks over about 3 kilometres (9,800 ft; 3,000 m), with some ash fall on nearby villages and temporarily interrupting international flights.

=== June ===
Another explosion occurred at the volcano at 13 June 2019, 01:38 local time. A Vulcanian eruption ejected much incandescent material to distances of at least 700 metres (2,300 ft) from the crater and generated an ash plume that rose to 30,000 feet (9,100 m) altitude and drifting south over Denpasar.

According to PVMBG, the eruption lasted almost 10 minutes, marking it one of the longest in the recent series of such Vulcanian explosions. A small earthquake swarm and slight inflation on 12 June 2019 preceded the eruption.

== Impact ==
The 2017 eruption caused some 40,000 people to be evacuated from 22 villages around Mount Agung. It also caused surrounding airports to be closed. Lombok International Airport, on the neighboring island of Lombok, closed on 26 November, but was reopened the next morning, only to be closed again on 30 November. Lombok's airport reopened on 1 December. Ngurah Rai International Airport, located at the southern tip of the island and southwest of the volcano, closed on 27 November. More than 450 flights were canceled and about 75,000 passengers were affected. The airport was reopened on 29 November. This eruption also caused a decline in tourism on Bali by about 30%.
