= Mount Agung =

Stratovolcano in Bali, Indonesia

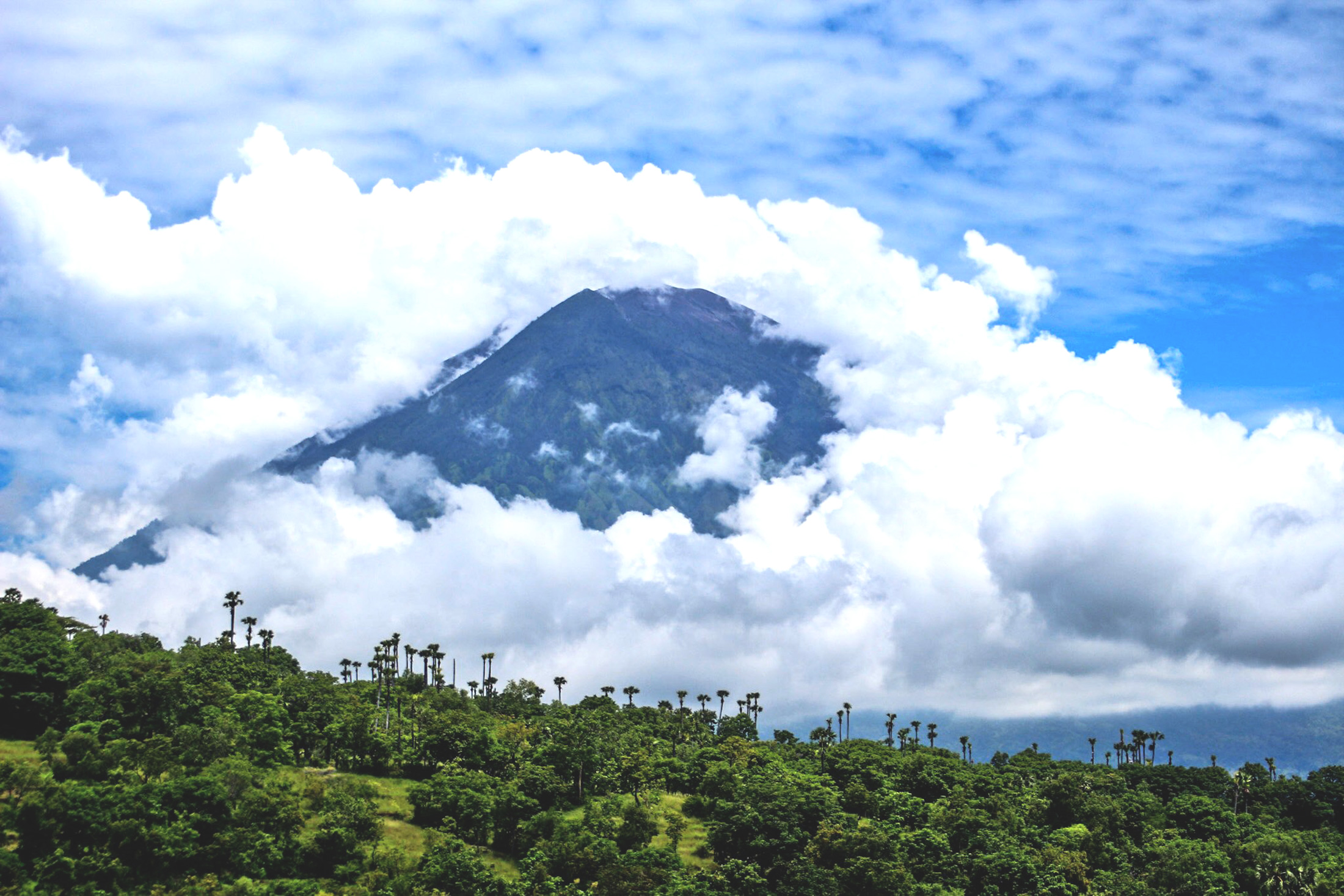
- Mount Agung, 2020

Highest point
- Elevation: 3,031 m (9,944 ft)
- Prominence: 3,031 m (9,944 ft); Ranked 87th
- Listing: Island high point Ultra; Ribu
- Coordinates: 8°20′27″S 115°30′12″E

Naming
- Native name: ᬕᬸᬦᬸᬂᬆᬕᬸᬂ (Balinese)
- English translation: The Great Mountain

Geography
- Location within Bali
- Location: Bali, Indonesia

Geology
- Mountain type: Stratovolcano
- Volcanic arc: Sunda Arc
- Last eruption: 2022

Climbing
- Easiest route: Besakih Temple

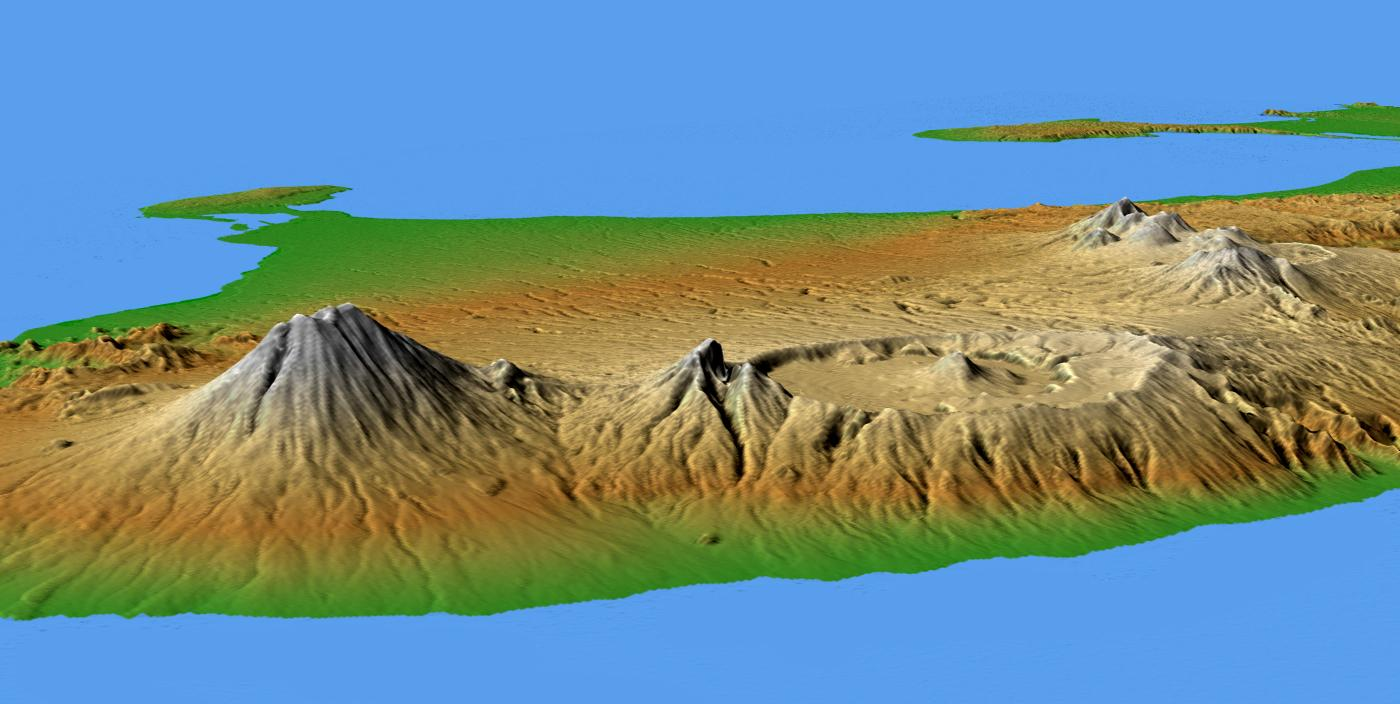
Mount Agung is at the left; Mount Batur, or what remains of it, is to the right of center; on the far right is Mount Bratan. This view is looking to the south west.

Mount Agung (Indonesian: Gunung Agung; Balinese: ᬕᬸᬦᬸᬂᬆᬕᬸᬂ, romanized: gunung āgung, lit. 'The Great Mountain') is an active volcano in Karangasem Regency, Bali, Indonesia. It is located southeast of Mount Batur volcano, also in Bali. It is the highest point on Bali, and dominates the surrounding area, influencing the climate, especially rainfall patterns. From a distance, the mountain appears to be perfectly conical. From the peak of the mountain, it is possible to see the peak of Mount Rinjani on the nearby island of Lombok, to the east, although both mountains are frequently covered in clouds. Agung is a stratovolcano, with a large and deep crater. Its most recent eruptions occurred from 2017–2019.

== History of eruptions ==
=== 1843 eruption ===
Agung erupted in 1843, as recorded in a report by Heinrich Zollinger:

"After having been dormant for a long time, this year the mountain began to be alive again. In the first days of the activity earthquake shocks were felt after which followed the emission of ash, sand and stones."

=== 1963–64 eruption ===
The eruption of 1963 was one of the largest and most devastating eruptions in Indonesia's history.

On February 18, 1963, local residents heard loud explosions and saw clouds rising from the crater of Mount Agung. On February 24, lava began flowing down the northern slope of the mountain, eventually traveling 7 km in the next 20 days. On March 17, the volcano erupted (VEI 5), sending debris 8 to 10 km into the air and generating massive pyroclastic flows. These flows devastated numerous villages, killing an estimated 1,100–1,500 people. Cold lahars caused by heavy rainfall after the eruption killed an additional 200. A second eruption on May 16 led to pyroclastic flows that killed another 200 inhabitants. Minor eruptions and flows followed and lasted almost a year.

The lava flows missed, sometimes by mere meters, the Mother Temple of Besakih. The saving of the temple is regarded by Balinese as miraculous and a signal from the gods that they wished to demonstrate their power but not destroy the monument that the Balinese had erected.

During the eruptions and earthquakes, the wreck of the US transport ship, USAT Liberty, which had been grounded at nearby Tulamben during World War II after being torpedoed by a Japanese submarine, slipped off the beach and settled totally underwater.

Andesite was the dominant lava type with some samples mafic enough to be classified as basaltic andesite. The eruption had global effects on temperatures.

=== 2017–2019 seismic activity and eruption ===
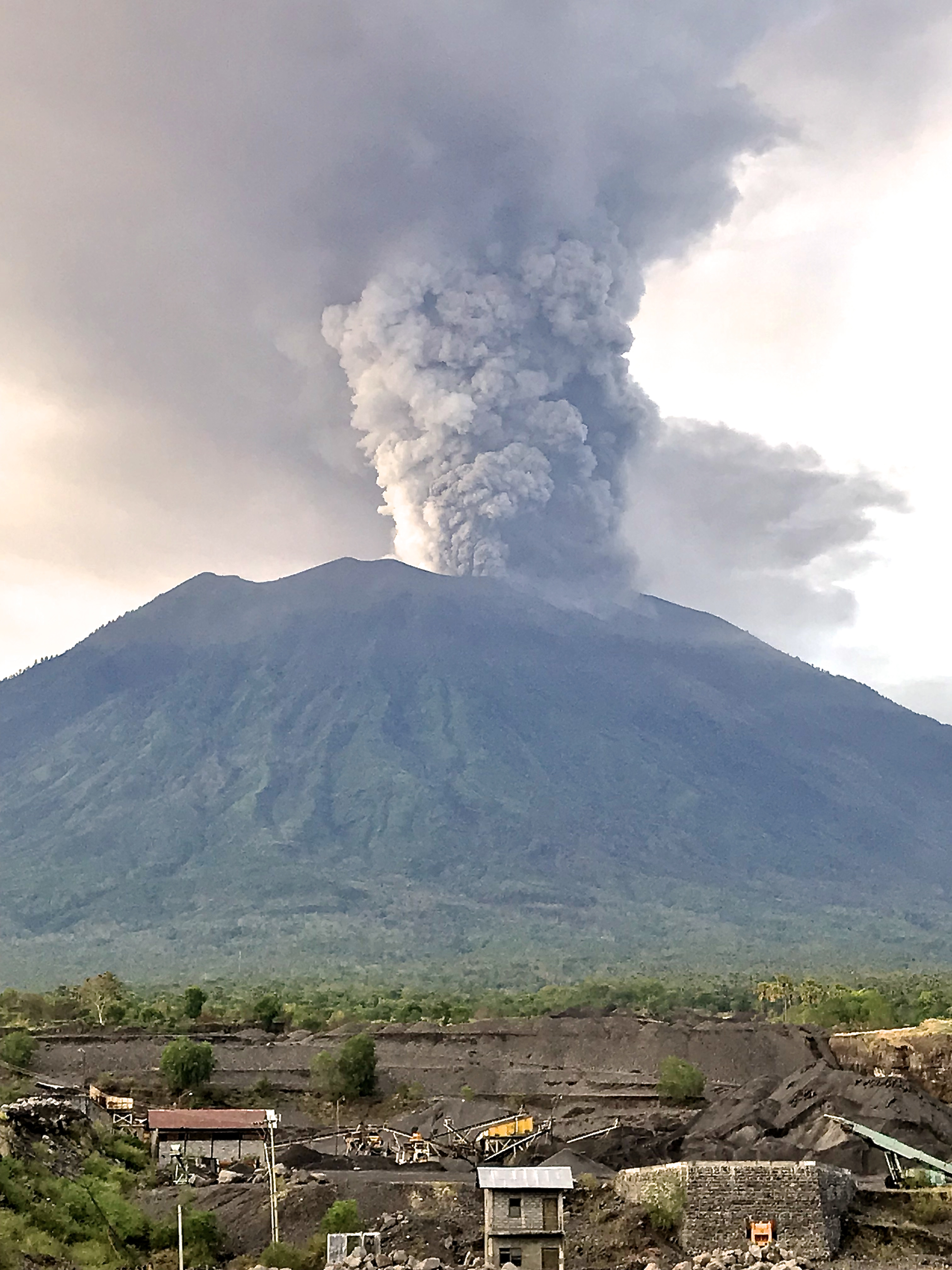
Mount Agung erupting on 27 November 2017

In late 2017, the area experienced 844 volcanic earthquakes, peaking at 300 to 400 earthquakes on 26 September. The frequency and intensity of these quakes caused much alarm among seismologists, as similar volcanoes have historically been known to erupt with even fewer warning signs. Alert was raised to the highest level and about 122,500 people were evacuated from their houses around the volcano. The Indonesian National Disaster Management Authority declared a 12-kilometre exclusion zone around the volcano on 24 September.

Evacuees gathered in sports halls and other community buildings around Klungkung, Karangasem, Buleleng, and other areas. By late October 2017, the activity of the volcano decreased significantly, leading to lowering of the highest status of emergency on 29 October.

On 21 November, activity increased once again. A phreatic eruption took place, with the ash cloud top reaching 3,842 metres (12,605 ft) above sea level. Thousands of people immediately fled the area, and over 29,000 temporary refugees were reported to be housed in over 270 locations nearby. Early on Saturday 25 November a magmatic eruption began. The resulting eruption plume was reported to rise about 1.5–4 km above the summit crater, drifting towards the south and dusting the surroundings with thin layer of dark ash, leading some airlines to cancel flights bound for Australia and New Zealand. An orange glow was later observed around the crater at night, suggesting that fresh magma had indeed reached the surface. On 26 November 2017, another eruption occurred, the second in less than a week. Ngurah Rai International Airport was closed 26 November 2017, leaving many tourists stranded. Lahars were reported in the Selat district south of the volcano. More than 100,000 people in a 10 km (6 mi) radius of the volcano were ordered to evacuate.

Australia's Bureau of Meteorology reported on 27 November that ash from the eruption had been observed at an altitude of 9,144 m. By the beginning of December, the eruption reduced to minor emissions of steam and smoke. On 12 December, a picture of the crater was taken showing a steadily growing lava dome occupying approximately one third of the crater.

In June 2018, Agung erupted with 2 km high plumes interrupting air traffic. On 3 July, a Strombolian explosion occurred, sending debris in all directions. In late May 2019 an eruption spewed lava and rocks over about 3 km, with some ash falling on nearby villages and temporarily interrupting international flights.

Further small eruptions occurred in 2022: ash plumes rose about 700 m above the summit on 3 April and about 2.5 km on 27 May, and a further explosion was detected seismically on 13 December.

== Influence on the climate ==
In Bali, the wet or rainy season runs from November to March – but it does not wet the whole island equally. The mountain range of Gunung Agung creates a rain shadow that divides the island between a dry northern part (narrower) and a wet southern part (broader). In the 1984–2009 period, the average annual rainfall in the northern part was 1761.3 mm / year, while the southern part received 2024.5 mm / year.

Of the 27 wildfires recorded in Bali's forests and savannas in September 2023, 13 – nearly half – occurred in the area surrounding Mount Agung in the Karangasem Regency; 5 fires were in the Buleleng Regency (northern part of the island) and 5 were near Mount Batur in the Bangli Regency. (Temperatures decrease from April to July, then rise again from August onward.)

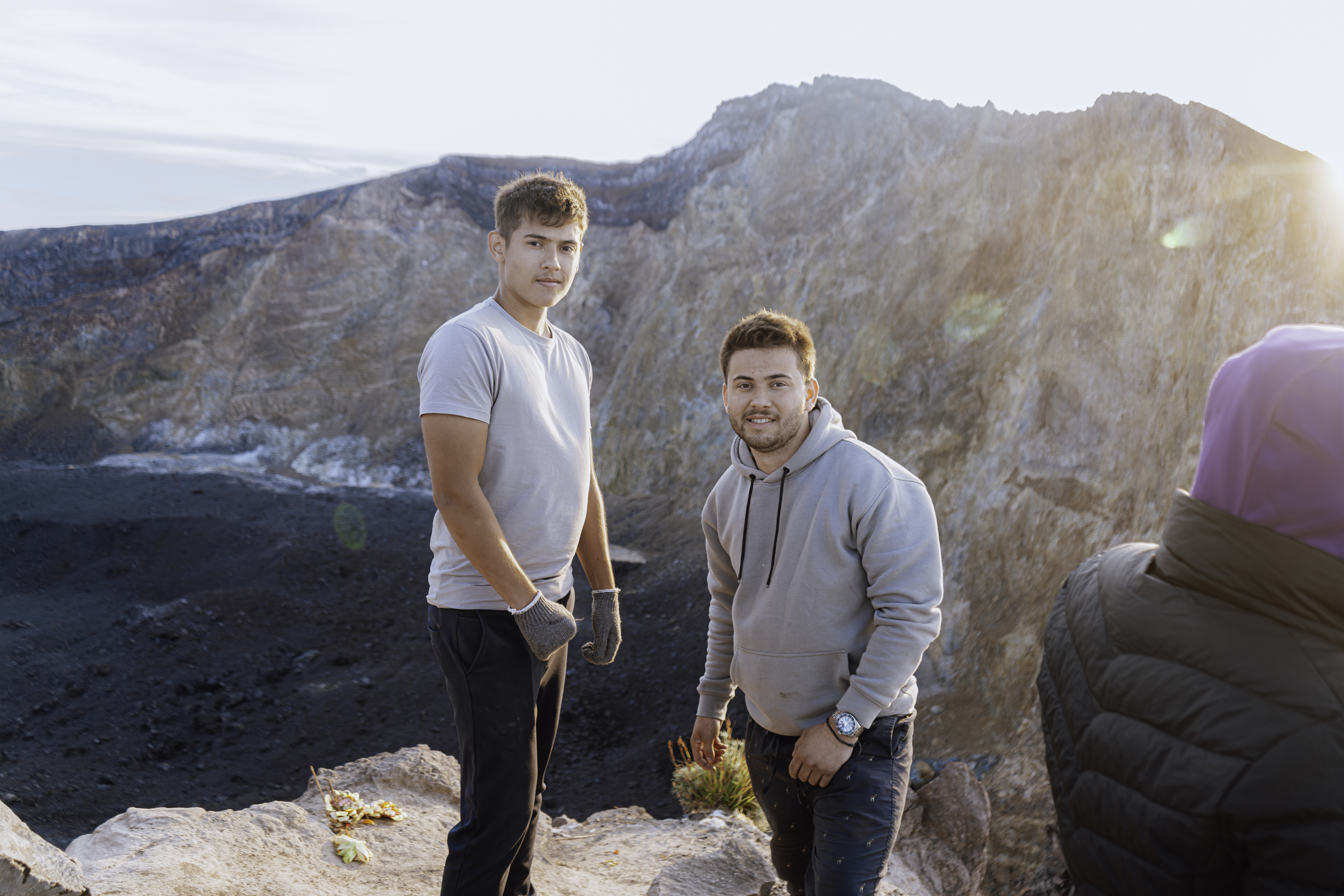
Dutch tourists reach the summit before sunrise on Mount Agung

== Religious beliefs ==
Balinese people believe that Mount Agung is a replica of Mount Meru, the central axis of the universe. The most important temple on Bali, Pura Besakih, is high on the slopes of Mount Agung.

== See also ==
- List of Southeast Asian mountains
- List of ultras of the Malay Archipelago
- List of volcanic eruptions by death toll
- List of volcanoes in Indonesia
- Pura Besakih, a temple complex on Mount Agung
