= Constitutional Union Party =

Constitutional Union Party may refer to:

- Union Party (United States, 1850), a party active in the south in the early 1850s
- Constitutional Union Party (United States), a party that was active in the United States on a national level in 1860
- Constitutional Union Party (Cuba), a political party in Cuba during the Spanish colonial times.
- Constitutional Union Party (Iraq)
- Constitutional Union Party (Lebanon), a political party in Lebanon and continuation of the Constitutional Bloc
- Constitutional Union (Morocco), a liberal conservative political party in Morocco
