= Constitutional Bloc =

The Constitutional Bloc may refer to:

- Constitutional Bloc (Bulgaria), a defunct political alliance in Bulgaria
- Constitutional Bloc (Lebanon), a political party in Lebanon, now defunct, continued as Constitutional Union Party
- Constitutional block (France), French texts having the same force as the Constitution
