= Pacific Disaster Center =

Natural disaster mitigation agency based in Hawaii

The Pacific Disaster Center (PDC) is an applied science, information and technology center, working to reduce disaster risks and impacts on life, property, and the economies worldwide.

PDC's products and services are used to support sound decision making in disaster response and civil-military humanitarian assistance operations, as well as in disaster risk reduction, mitigation and planning. The center is primarily engaged in:

- Enhance Disaster early warning and decision support capabilities and technologies;
- Advancing risk and vulnerability assessment (RVA), including socio-cultural analyses of risk;
- Cultivating international working partnerships to support capacity building in developing countries through training and technical assistance;
- Supporting humanitarian assistance and disaster relief operations.

== Organization ==
PDC was established by the U.S. Congress following Hurricane Iniki's devastation of the Hawaiian Island of Kauai in 1992, and became operational in 1996. Originally created to use information resources to mitigate the impacts of natural disasters in Hawaiʻi, today PDC resources are used locally and globally by disaster and crisis management professionals, planners and executive decision makers, national governments, regional organizations, and International- and Non-Governmental Organizations (I/NGO).

The headquarters of PDC is located on the Island of Maui in Hawai‘i, with additional presence on the Island of Oahu, in Colorado and Washington, DC. PDC also maintains a project office at the Water Resource University in Hanoi, Vietnam. Since 2006, the University of Hawaiʻi has been the managing partner of PDC.

PDC is a public/private partnership sponsored by the PDC Program Office (OSD-Policy). The content of the information here does not necessarily reflect the position or policy of the U.S. Government and no official Government endorsement should be inferred.

== Major projects and activities of PDC ==
In its earliest years, PDC did the initial development and deployment of various applications and web-based tools for the use of disaster management professionals and the general public. Those tools have been maintained and further developed since, and have been deployed to more organizations and nations. The Center developed its first computerized decision support system for disaster managers within the U.S. military working in the Caribbean.

=== 1996–2003 ===
PDC also support for humanitarian efforts in Afghanistan in 2002. Event-related efforts from 1996 through 2003 included providing direct information-technology support for operations related to Hurricane Jimena threatening Hawaii, flooding and landslides in American Samoa, Super Typhoon Pongsona in Guam and the Northern Mariana Islands, Super Typhoon Lupit in the Philippines and Federated States of Micronesia; and numerous wildfires on Maui.

=== 2004–2005 ===
In the 2004–2005 period, PDC provided a wide range of support to the countries impacted by the Great Sumatra Earthquake and Indian Ocean tsunami (December 26, 2004), initiating a line of work and establishing partnerships that have continued ever since. PDC also engaged in developing and hosting the Asia Pacific Natural Hazards Information Network (APNHIN); conducting a multi-hazard urban risk assessment for Marikina, Philippines; mapping flood hazards and conducting risk assessments for the Mekong River Basin; providing the 10-member Association of Southeast Asian Nations (ASEAN) with a Disaster Information Sharing and Communications Network (DISCNet); developing an earthquake atlas for Hawaii based on FEMA's HAZUS software; collaborating with the Maui High-Performance Computing Center to develop an interactive, map-based interface for an ocean environmental database; customizing a wildfire rating system for Hawaii and mapping both wildfires and fire fuels; and developing a digital, geospatial database of critical infrastructure for Hawaii.

=== 2005–2006 ===
The efforts begun in immediate response to the Indian Ocean tsunami continued through the years 2005 and 2006, and eventually included a major technical assistance project, supported by USTDA, to provide Thailand with a decision support and early warning system. The growth of APNHIN and the ASEAN DISCNet continued, perhaps accelerated by ongoing tsunami-related activities. PDC collaborated with the South Pacific Applied Geoscience Commission to develop a Tsunami Awareness Kit for the Pacific Islands. At this time, PDC, in partnership with Earthquakes and Megacities Initiative, also built and launched a worldwide “knowledge base” pooling the resources of 20 international population centers. The Center developed new products for Hawaii and its counties including remote information services for Maui and a statewide regional secure server. As PDC's capabilities increased, the Center was involved in more and more exercises in Hawaii and across the Pacific, it was called upon all the more frequently to support activities in response to disasters. In this period, some of the major events were Hurricane Katrina in the U.S., multiple tropical cyclones in the Central Pacific, a major landslide on Leyte Island in the Philippines, and sustained severe weather and flooding in Hawaii.

=== 2007–2009 ===
During the years 2007–2009, while constantly improving and expanding the technical tools offered to disaster managers and the public, PDC also expanded the APNHIN program from Asia Pacific to global, rebranding it the Global Hazards Information Network (GHIN) and launched a worldwide Atlas, as well. Some of the major areas of focus for PDC were disaster planning and preparedness in Vietnam; tracking avian influenza, and later, Influenza A (H1N1) also called swine flu; assisting with responses to repeated (sometimes called “unprecedented”) severe weather in Hawaii; earthquakes each year in Indonesia, some of them spawning tsunamis; the Kiholo Bay earthquake in Hawaii; a major earthquake and tsunami in the Solomon Islands; and a fleet of tropical cyclones all across the Pacific, with many of them setting records of intensity and for the damage done. Among the notable storm events that engaged PDC most and longest was Tropical Cyclone Nargis, Burma, 2008; and a series of typhoons beginning with Ketsana, Philippines and throughout the region, 2009. For both of these events, PDC put a Geographic information system and communications expert on the ground to work with United Nations teams and others, coordinating connections, developing maps and collaborating with PDC Maui to provide immediately useful maps, images and data products.

=== Week of Pacific Disasters ===
In the fall of 2009, the Pacific was plagued by disasters, and Pacific Disaster Center's resources were severely tested. In the six days from September 27 to October 1, the Center created and delivered products or otherwise provided direct support for the responses to Typhoon Ketsana, especially the storm's devastating effects on Manila, Philippines; Typhoon Parma, which increased the disastrous flooding in Manila; Super Typhoon Melor, the worst effects of which were felt in the Commonwealth of the Northern Mariana Islands and in Japan; multiple earthquakes and a devastating tsunami in Samoa and American Samoa; and another cluster of earthquakes in West Sumatra, Indonesia. Just days after this “Week of Pacific Disasters,” there was an additional cluster of earthquakes, notably in Vanuatu where another tsunami was generated, and new tropical cyclones formed, as well.

== See also ==
- 2017–2019 eruptions of Mount Agung
- 2020 Cyclone Amphan
- Coral Triangle Initiative (CTI-CFF)
- Geographic information system (GIS)
- High-performance computing (Center)
- Hawaii International Conference on System Sciences
- National Domestic Preparedness Consortium
- Tsunami warning system
- Volcano
- Water resources (University)
