= Coronary Drug Project =

Clinical trial

The Coronary Drug Project (CDP) was a large clinical trial which assessed several different treatments for coronary heart disease in men with previous myocardial infarction. The study was conducted from 1965 to 1985 at 53 clinical centers and randomized 8,341 men age 30 to 64 years to six different treatment groups: low-dose estrogen therapy (2.5 mg/day oral conjugated estrogens), high-dose estrogen therapy (5 mg/day oral conjugated estrogens), clofibrate (1.8 g/day), dextrothyroxine (6 mg/day), niacin (3 g/day), and placebo (lactose 3.8 mg/day).

The high-dose estrogen group was discontinued in 1970 due to increased non-fatal cardiovascular complications and an unfavorable trend in overall mortality, while the low-dose estrogen group was discontinued in 1970 due to lack of indication of benefit and also an unfavorable trend in overall mortality. Both dose levels of estrogen as well as clofibrate were also found to increase the incidence of gallbladder disease in the study. The dextrothyroxine group was discontinued in late 1971 due to increased cardiovascular mortality.

The Coronary Drug Project Aspirin Study was a substudy of the CDP which randomized men from the estrogen and dextrothyroxine groups of the trial which had been terminated early to either aspirin or placebo.
