= Institute for Certification of Computing Professionals =

Institute for the Certification of Computing Professionals
- Abbreviation: ICCP
- Founded: 1973
- Purpose: Professional association
- Headquarters: Chicago, Illinois
- Fields: Information technology
- President, Board of Directors: Dr. Bradley Jensen
- Website: https://www.iccp.org/

The Institute for the Certification of Computing Professionals (ICCP) is a non-profit (501(c)(6)) institution for professional certification in the Computer engineering and Information technology industry. It was founded in 1973 by 8 professional computer societies to promote certification and professionalism in the industry, lower the cost of development and administration of certification for all of the societies and act as the central resource for job standards and performance criteria.

The initial certification administered by ICCP in 1973 was the Certified Data Processor (CDP) which was originally created by the Data Processing Management Association (DPMA) in 1965. The institute is a society of Professional Associations, and affiliates across the world with other like organizations with similar goals.

The institute awards a professional certification, Certified Computing Professional (CCP), to individuals who pass a written examination and have at least 48 months experience in computer based information systems. Post secondary education can be substituted for up to 24 months of this requirement. The ICCP created the Certified Business Intelligence Professional (CBIP) in 2003 and the Certified Data Management Professional (CDMP) in 2004. Today the ICCP administers the CDMP as the Certified Data Professional (CDP). ICCP also offers Certified Data Scientist (CDS), Certified Big Data Professional (CBDP) and recently added the Certified Blockchain Professional (CBP).

The institute was responsible for creating the Systems Security Exam (today known as the Cyber Security Examination) for the Information Systems Security (ISC) organization which then became the ISC2 organization offering the CISSP. ICCP has also assisted Network Professional Association (NPA) to create and develop its certification program - Certified Network Professional. ICCP also created the Certified Data Management Professional (CDMP) in 2004 on a request from one of its constituent societies DAMA International. In 2015 the ICCP renamed the CDMP to be the Certified Data Professional to make it inclusive of data science and the myriad of data specialty jobs that were emerging.

Creators and Developers of the CDMP program were: Kewal Dhariwal, Patricia Cupoli, Brett Champlain. The Data Management Body of Knowledge (DMBoK v1 and v2) are based on the ICCP Examinations for each of the 11 areas of the DMBoK Wheel. Editors of the DMBoK were Patricia Cupoli, Deborah Henderson and Susan Earley (all members of the ICCP Certification Council). Patricia Cupoli was the ICCP Director of Certification during this development as well as representing DAMA International on the ICCP Board of Directors. Deborah Henderson was the President of DAMA Education Foundation who then fostered the development and editing of the DMBoK publication.

ICCP examinations are used by the Canadian Information Processing Society (CIPS) towards the Canadian Information Systems Professional (I.S.P.) credential which has received recognition by various Provinces as a recognized Public Occupation, under The Professional and Occupational Associations Registration Act which that regulates professions and occupations.

ICCP Examinations test for stringent industry fundamentals and assesses for expert mastery skills, along with work experience requirement and/or education.

== See also ==
Constituent Societies of the ICCP:

- Association for Computing Machinery (ACM)
- Association of Information Technology Professionals (CompTIA-AITP)
- Buchanan Edwards - R2C
- Canadian Information Processing Society
- CPCI - Council of Professional Informatics Societies of Argentina
- DAMA International
- Global Institute for IT Management
- Marketing Research & Intelligence Association (MRIA)

Affiliate Societies of the ICCP:

- TDWI - Transforming Data With Intelligence
- Big Data International (Beijing)
- Hong Kong Computer Society (HKCS)
- Argentina, Brazil, Canada, China & Hong Kong (3), Ghana, India, Nigeria, Morocco, Pakistan, Peru, Saudi Arabia, Sultanate of Oman, Tunisia, USA (9)
