= Partido Demócrata Cristiano =

Partido Demócrata Cristiano may refer to:

- Partido Demócrata Cristiano (Argentina), a political party in Argentina
- Partido Demócrata Cristiano (Bolivia), a political party in Bolivia
- Partido Demócrata Cristiano de Chile, a political party in Chile
- Partido Demócrata Cristiano (El Salvador), a political party in El Salvador
- Partido Demócrata Cristiano, former name of the People's Party in Panama
- Partido Demócrata Cristiano (Paraguay), a political party in Paraguay
- Christian Democrat Party (Peru)
- Partido Demócrata Cristiano del Uruguay, a political party in Uruguay

== See also ==
- Christian Democratic Party (disambiguation)
