= Association of Information Technology Professionals =

Information technology association

- Abbreviation: AITP
- Merged into: CompTIA
- Founded at: Chicago, Illinois
- Website: https://aitp.org

The Association of Information Technology Professionals (AITP) is a professional association that focuses on information technology education for business professionals. The group is a non-profit US-oriented group, but its activities are performed by 62 local chapters organized on a geographic basis, and 286 student chapters at colleges and universities.

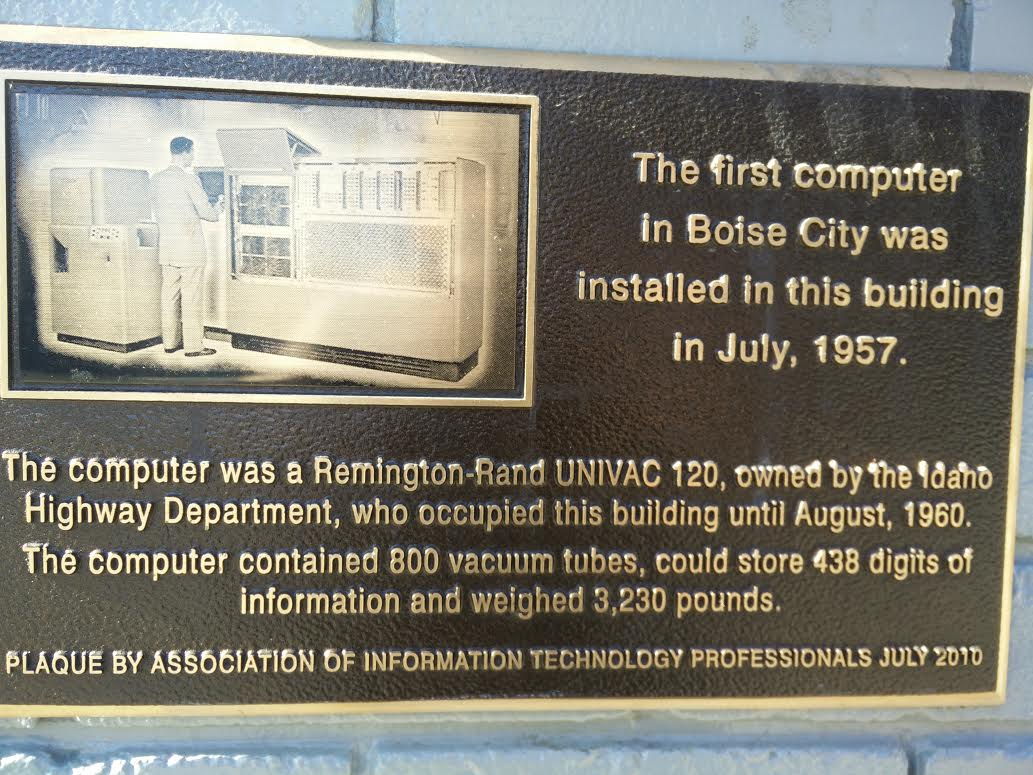
A historical plaque placed by the society in 2010 commemorating the first computer in Boise, Idaho, a UNIVAC 120 installed in 1957

== History ==
The group was first organized in Chicago, United States, in 1949 as the National Machine Accountants Association (NMAA). The State of Illinois granted the NMAA a charter on December 26, 1951. It soon had over 20 chapters. Harvey W. Protzel, systems manager for Protzel's Company, was elected the first International President at the 1952 First Annual Convention in Minneapolis. In 1962, it adopted the more inclusive name, Data Processing Management Association (DPMA), and in 1996, the present name.

The Association began its certification program with the Certificate in Data Processing (CDP) professional examination, first held in 1962 in New York City. In 1970, it added the Registered Business Programmer (RBP) examination. In 1974, the Association joined in establishing the Institute for the Certification of Computer Professionals (ICCP) to administer the examination program and stimulate industry acceptance of the examinations. The certification is now called Certified Computing Professional (CCP).

In 1969, the Association created the annual DPMA Man of the Year Award, awarding it (incongruously, given its name) to Dr. Grace Murray Hopper. After Dr. Ruth Davis of the US National Bureau of Standards won the 1979 award, it was renamed the Distinguished Information Sciences Award.

In 2017, the Association was purchased by CompTIA.

In 2019, CompTIA rebranded the national AITP as CompTIA IT Pro and Student Membership; however, many local chapters still retain the AITP name.

== Ethics ==
The Association requires its members to abide by a code of ethics. The Association also requires members to operate by a "Standards of Conduct" for IT Professionals, which adds specifics.

== See also ==
- Association for Computing Machinery
- IEEE Computer Society
