= Constitutional Democratic Party (disambiguation) =

Constitutional Democratic Party may refer to:

- Constitutional Democratic Party, Russia
- Constitutional Democratic Party (Italy)
- Constitutional Democratic Party (Japan), political party from 1927 to 1940
- Constitutional Democratic Party of Japan, political party since 2017
- Constitutional Democratic Party (Ukraine)
- Constitutional Democratic Party – Party of Popular Freedom

== See also ==
- Democratic Constitutional Rally, Tunisia
