= Pura Penataran Agung Lempuyang =

Hindu temple in Bali, Indonesia

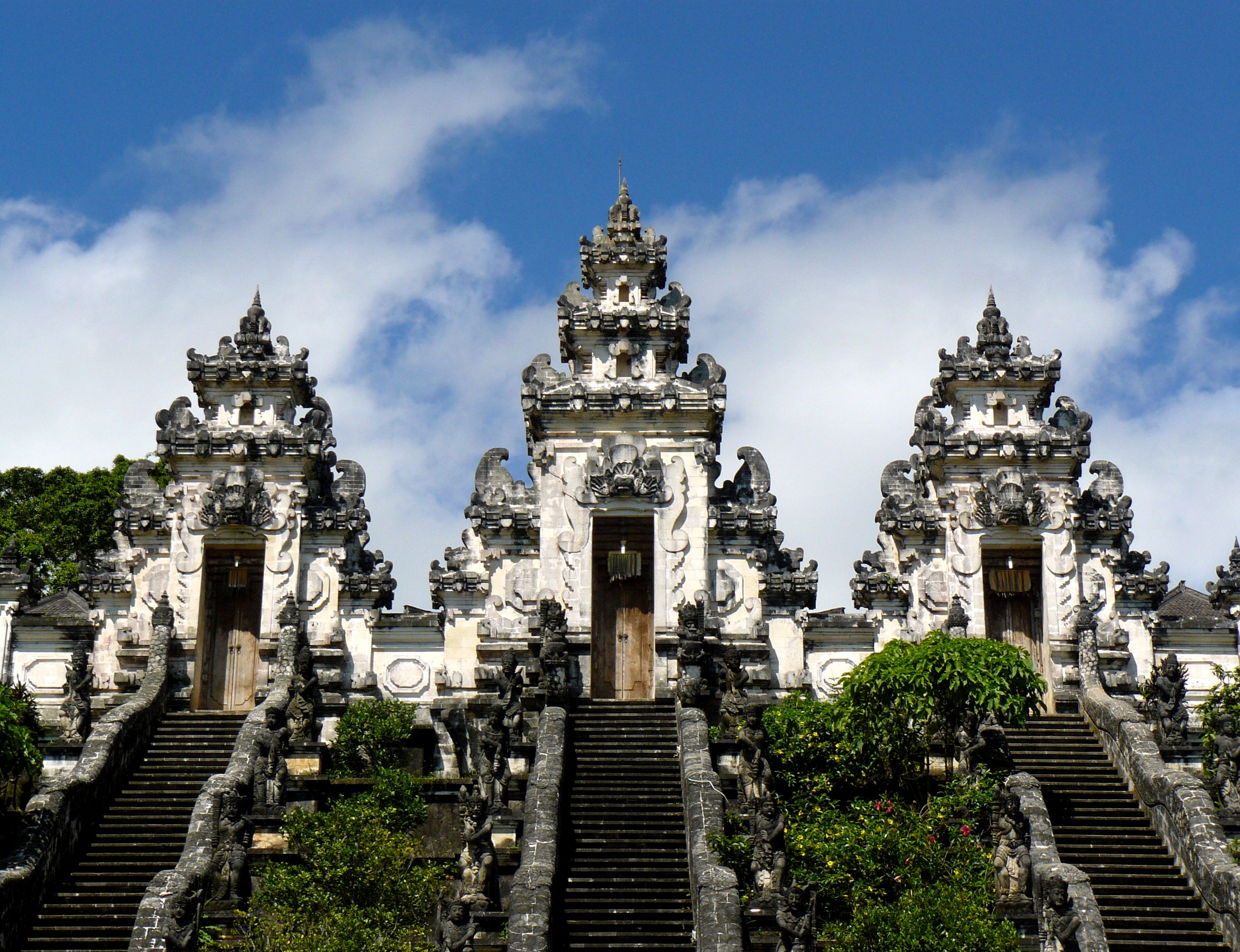
- Paduraksa portals marking the entrance to the middle sanctuary (jaba tengah) of Pura Penataran Agung Lempuyang, Bali.

- Location within Bali

General information
- Type: Pura
- Architectural style: Balinese
- Location: Banjar Purwa Ayu, Desa Tribuana, Abang District, Karangasem, Indonesia
- Coordinates: 8°23′29″S 115°37′53″E
- Elevation: 603 m (1,978 ft)

Pura Penataran Agung Lempuyang is a Balinese Hindu temple or pura on Mount Lempuyang in Karangasem Regency, Bali. It is the first and lowest temple of the complex of temples called Pura Lempuyang. The highest of these temples, Pura Lempuyang Luhur, is one of the Sad Kahyangan Jagad or "six sanctuaries of the world", six holiest places of worship on Bali, and one of the nine directional temples of Bali.

== Location ==
Pura Penataran Agung is located on the south-west side of Mount Lempuyang, 600 metres (2,000 ft) above sea level, in Abang district, Karangasem Regency.

Lempuyang is a Javanese name; the Balinese name is Gamongan.

== History ==
The establishment of places of worship around Mount Lempuyang is believed to predate the majority of Hindu temples on the island of Bali.

Two epigraphs, Epigraph Sading C and Epigraph Dewa Purana Bangsul, tell the spiritual history of the temple. According to the first one, en 1072 Caka (balinese lunar calendar; 993–994 in gregorian calendar), Cri Maharaj Jayacakti is told by his father to go to Bali and build a temple on the Lempuyang mountain, for it to be Bali's salvation and to bring more people to that area. The other epigraph says that Lord Paramecwara sent one of his sons, Cri Gnijayacakti, to Bali to become the saviour of the island.

Pura Penataran Agung Lempuyang was restored in 2001.

== Lempuyang temples ==
The Pura Lempuyang complex includes seven temples along the hiking path to the summit of Mount Lempuyang. The seven temples are, from the lowest to the highestː

- Pura Penataran Agung Lempuyang
- Pura Telaga Mas, second temple met from the entrance
- Pura Telaga Sawangan
- Pura Lempuyang Madya
- Pura Puncak Bisbis, fifth temple
- Pura Pasar Agung, sixth temple
- Pura Lempuyang Luhur, seventh temple

== Religious signification ==
Pura Lempuyang Luhur, the main temple of the Lempuyang temple complex, is one of the Sad Kahyangan Jagad or the "six sanctuaries of the world", the six holiest places of worship on Bali. According to Balinese beliefs, they are the pivotal points of the island, meant to provide spiritual balance to Bali.

Pura Lempuyang Luhur is also one of the nine directional temples (Pura Kahyangan Padma Bhuwana) of Bali, with each of the nine temples marking a cardinal direction plus the center. Pura Lempuyang Luhur represents the east direction (purwa) and the color white. This direction is associated with the domain of the Balinese god Iswara.

The whole Lempuyang mountain was divided into three sections which corresponds to the Balinese cosmology, the base of the mountain is known as Sang Ananta Bhoga and corresponds to the mount of Brahma, the middle part of the mountain is known as Sang Naga Basukih and corresponds to mount of Vishnu, while the top of the mountain is known as Sang Naga Taksaka and is considered as mount of Shiva. The most sacred point of Mount Lempuyang is the highest, where the Pura Lempuyang Luhur is built. Pura Penataran Agung, also known as Pura Silawana Hyang Sar, is located in the middle part of the mountain; while at the base of the mountain, the Pura Dalem Dasar Lempuyang is built.

== Temple layout ==
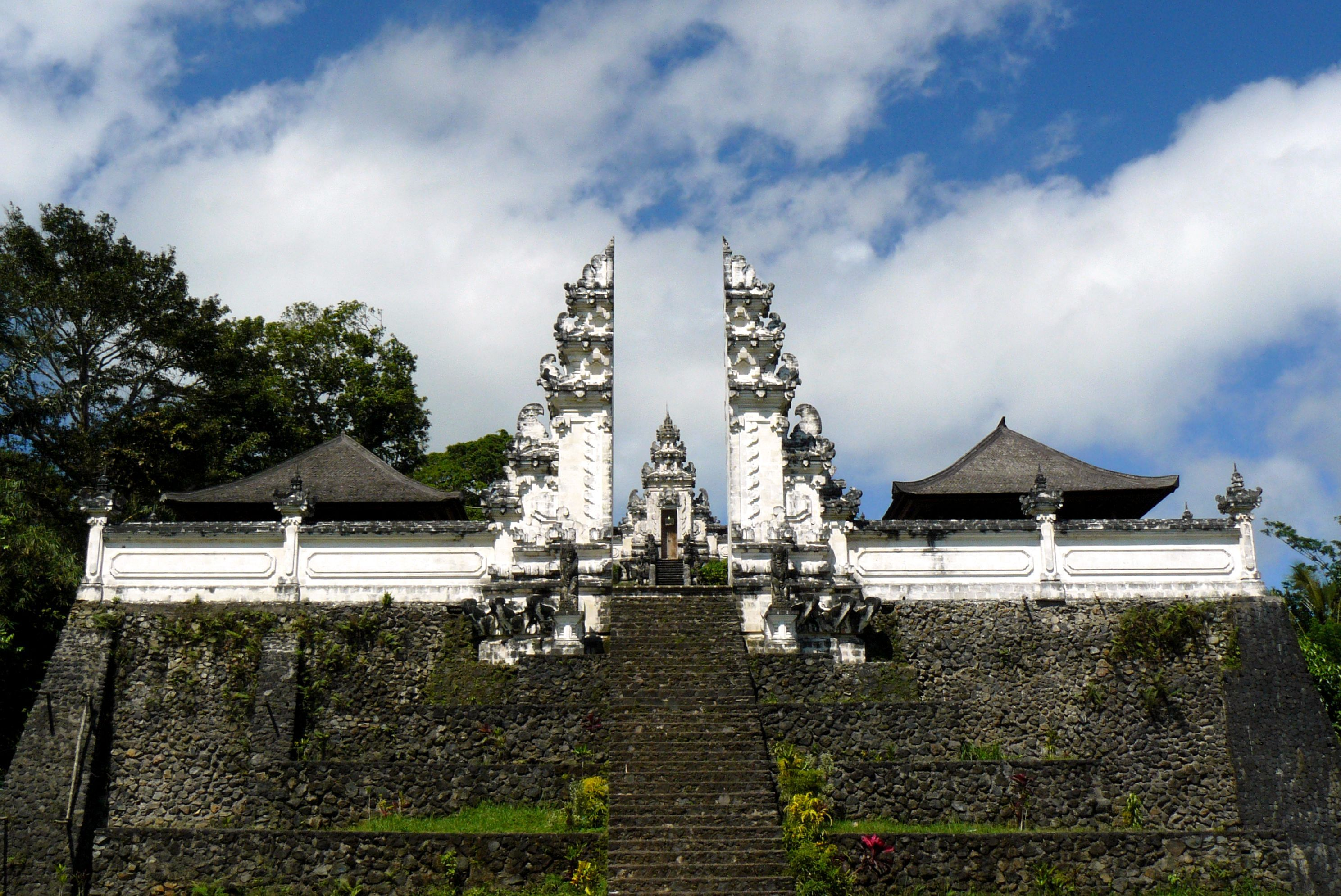
The split gate (candi bentar) marking the entrance to the outer sanctuary (jaba pisan) of Pura Lempuyang Luhur.

Mount Lempuyang, also known as Mount Lempuyang Luhur, is one of the most sacred natural points in Bali.

Pura Penataran Agung Lempuyang is oriented toward the top of Mount Lempuyang. The temple compound is divided into three areas: the outer sanctuary of the temple (jaba pisan or nistaning mandala), the middle sanctuary (jaba tengah or madya mandala), and the inner main sanctuary (jero or utamaning mandala).

The entrance to the outer sanctuary (jaba pisan) is marked with a white-painted split gate (candi bentar). Several bale (Balinese pavilions) are located in the outer sanctuary. One of them is the rectangular bale gong ("gong pavilion") where the gamelans are stored; another bale in this courtyard is the bale kulkul where the percussive drum to call for prayer is placed.

The entrance to the middle sanctuary (jaba tengah) is marked with three white-painted paduraksa portals. The passage to the left is used for entry, while the passage to the right is used for exit. The central door is usually closed and is only opened during the temple's main festival: the biannual piodalan festival. The central portal is where sacred objects, heirloom, and offerings could pass during festival time. All three flight of stairs which lead to the paduraksa portals is flanked with mythical figures of Naga. Sculptures inspired by the epic of Mahabharata, e.g. of Arjuna, Bima, and Yudhistira, dot the surroundings of the stairs. On the uppermost level of these is the statue of Krishna, the worldly form of Vishnu.

The uppermost inner sanctuary (jero) is the most sacred courtyard of Balinese temples. The courtyard of Pura Penataran Agung Lempuyang features several meru towers and pelinggih shrines, each dedicated to different gods and local deities. Several padmasana shrines - in the shape of empty stone thrones - are dedicated to the Sang Hyang Widhi, highest god of Hindu pantheon, and to the gods of the Trimurti.

== Ritual ==
The piodalan or puja wali festival (anniversary of the temple) of Pura Penataran Agung is held once every 6 months every Thursday (Waraspati) or one day after the Galungan festival.

== See also ==
=== Related articles ===
- Balinese temple

=== Bibliography ===
- Auger, Timothy, ed. (2001). Bali & Lombok. Eyewitness Travel Guides. London: Dorling Kindersley. ISBN 0751368709.
- Stuart-Fox, David (1999). Fox, James J. (ed.). Religion and Ritual: Balinese Hindu Temples. Indonesian Heritage. Singapore: Archipelago Press. ISBN 9813018585.
- Suardana, Kartika Dewi (2014). Real Bali: Temples, Palaces, Museums and Nature. PT. Phoenix Communications. ISBN 9786029797169.

=== External links ===
- Ketut Gobyah (2017). "Pura Lempuyang Luhur". babadbali.com (in Indonesian). Yayasan Bali Galang. Archived from the original on November 26, 2017.
