= Kotes, Gandusari, Blitar =

Kotes Kotès
- village
- Coordinates: 8.062301°S 112.287891°E
- Country: Indonesia
- Province: Jawa Timur
- Regency: Blitar Regency
- District: Gandusari

Population (2010)
  - Total: 1,911
- Postal code: 66187

Kotes (Indonesian pronunciation: [kɔt̪ɛs]; Javanese: Kotès) village in Blitar Regency, located on the island of Java in the province of Jawa Timur, Indonesia. In 2010, 1,911 inhabitants lived in the village of Kotes.
