= Pura Lempuyang Luhur =

Hindu temple in Bali, Indonesia

- Location within Bali

General information
- Type: Pura
- Architectural style: Balinese
- Location: West Seraya, Karangasem District, Karangasem Regency, Indonesia
- Coordinates: 8°23′43″S 115°38′52″E
- Elevation: 1,060 m (3,480 ft)

Pura Lempuyang Luhur is the seventh and highest temple of the Lempuyang temple complex on Mount Lempuyang in Karangasem Regency, east Bali, Indonesia.

It is one of the nine directional temples (Pura Sad Kahyangan or Pura Kahyangan Sad Winayaka) of Bali, which are the nine holiest places of worship on Bali. It is dedicated to Ida Betara Hyang Iswara, the guardian of the east.

== Location ==
Pura Lempuyang is located on Mount Lempuyang or Gamongan Hill, in Karangasem district, about 12 kilometres north of Amlapura, the capital of Karangasem Regency. The village of Bunutan is to the north-east (15 km by road), that of Tista is 10 km north-west

Pura Lempuyang Luhur is the seventh and highest temple of the complex, at 1,060 m (Note: An altitude of 1,175 m above sea level is also cited by a commercial website: "Lempuyang Temple in Bali". au.hotels.com..) above sea level, near the peak of Mount Lempuyang.

== Lempuyang temples ==
The Pura Lempuyang complex includes seven temples along the hiking path to the summit of Mount Lempuyang.

The seven temples are, from the lowest to the highestː

- Pura Penataran Lempuyang
- Pura Telaga Mas, second temple met from the entrance
- Pura Telaga Sawangan
- Pura Lempuyang Madya
- Pura Puncak Bisbis, fifth temple
- Pura Pasar Agung, sixth temple
- Pura Lempuyang Luhur, seventh temple

The most popular temple among visitors is the Pura Penataran Agung Lempuyang. With its towering white candi bentar split gate, three dragon stairs and three kori agung gates, this compound has views to the west overlooking Mount Agung, the highest volcano in Bali.

== See also ==
- Hinduism in Indonesia
- Pura Ulun Danu Bratan
- Besakih
