= Plumbangan =

Plumbangan Temple
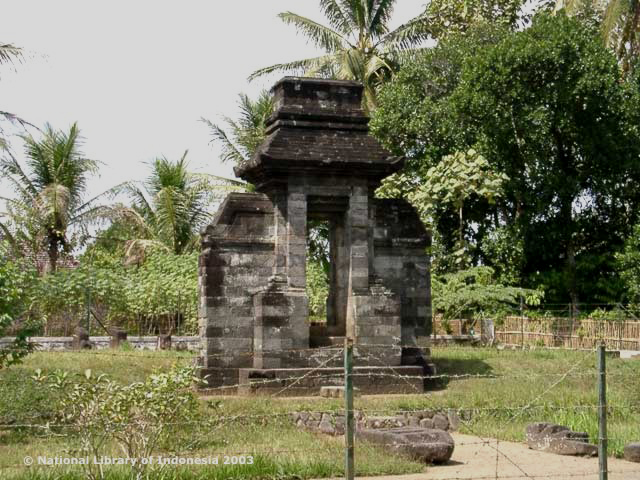
- Plumbangan Temple

- Location within Indonesia

General information
- Architectural style: Candi
- Location: Blitar Regency, East Java., Indonesia
- Coordinates: 8.074516°S 112.339754°E
- Construction started: Majapahit Empire about 1300
- Completed: 1390

Technical details
- Structural system: Paduraksa

Plumbangan is a candi that actually is a paduraksa-style gate with cube-shaped peak. The gate is located at Plumbangan village, Doko subdistrict, Blitar Regency, East Java, Indonesia.

The gate was made of andesite stone, with a length of 4.09 m, width 2.27 m and height 5.6 m. The gate has a wing on either side and has no relief, but only a seam line.

The surviving structure is not a temple, it is a gate and was part of a larger complex or a compound. However, the surrounding walls and other structures did not survive. A similar site, the Bajang Ratu gate in Trowulan is also a surviving single gate. It is not clear whether the compound was a religious or secular in nature.

At the top of the doorway are carved figures in 1312 Saka (1390 CE), and estimated to be built during the reign of King Wikramawardhana of Majapahit. In general, the structure is still fairly well preserved.
