= Candi bentar =

Type of gate in Indonesian architecture

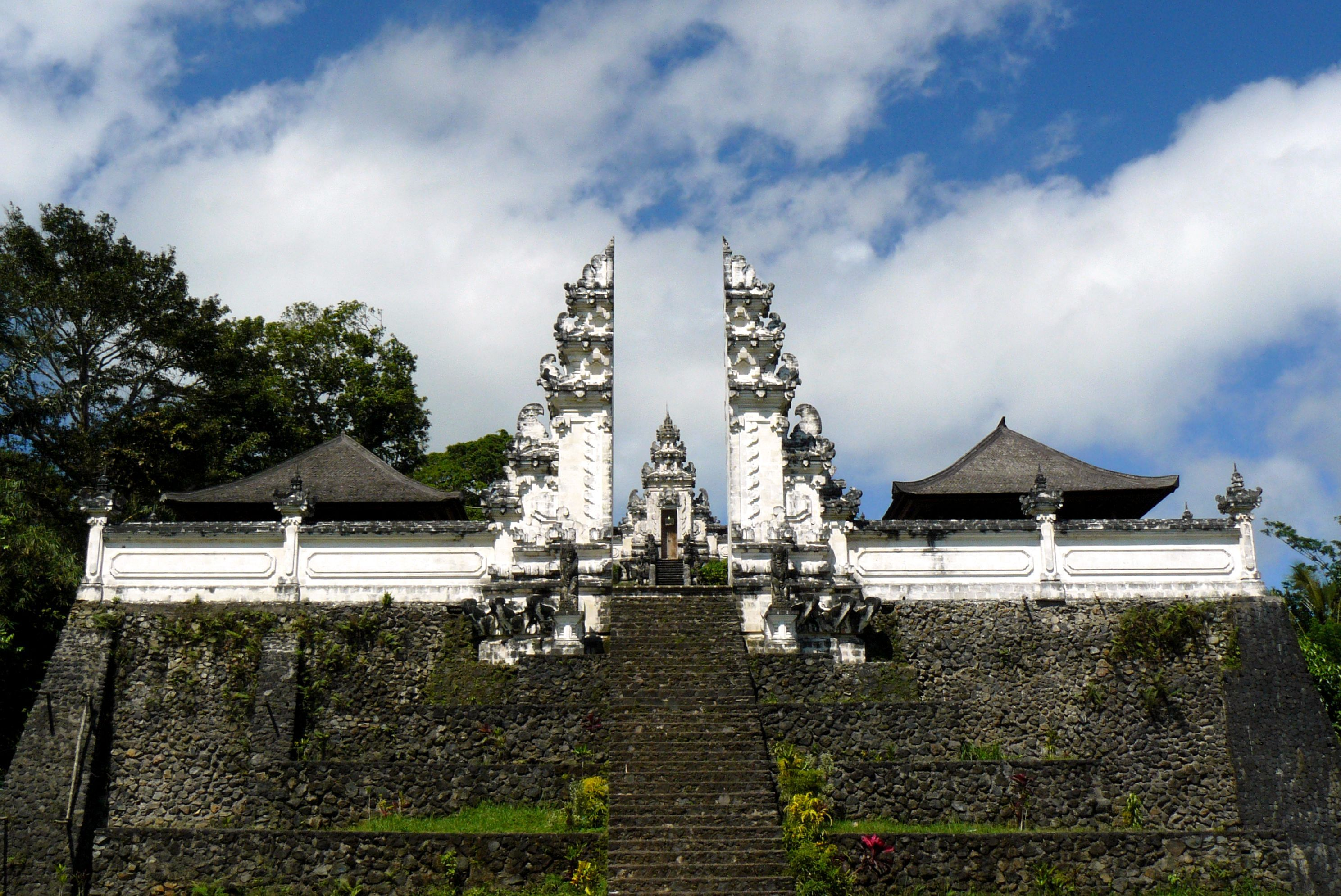
A candi bentar marks the entrance into a Balinese temple Pura Lempuyang Luhur, Bali.

Candi bentar, or split gateway, is a classical Javanese and Balinese gateway entrance commonly found at the entrance of religious compounds, palaces, or cemeteries in Indonesia. It is a candi-like structure split perfectly in two to create a passage in the center for people to walk through. In contrast to the very ornate shape and decoration of the main faces, the sides of the passage are left completely plain. The passage is usually elevated with a flight of stairs to reach it. A candi bentar is commonly found in Java, Bali, and Lombok.

== Form ==
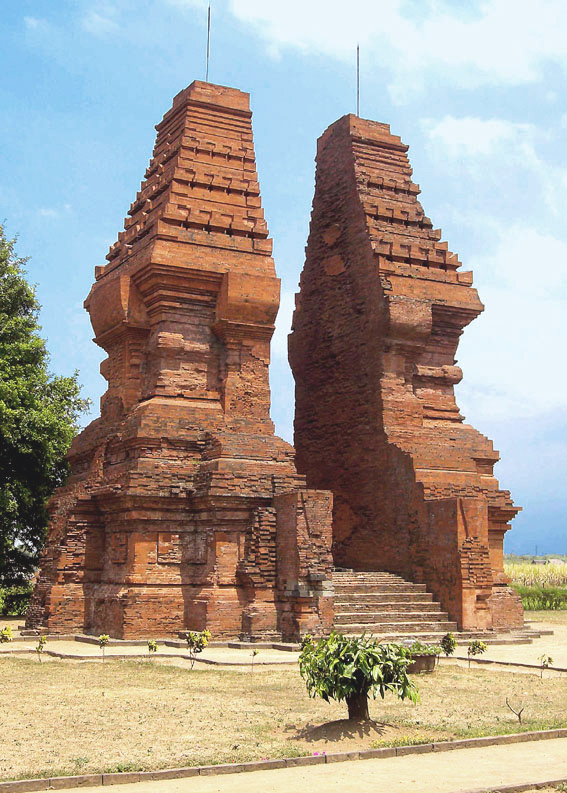
Wringin Lawang split gate at Trowulan, one of the oldest surviving candi bentar.

Candi bentar has a candi-like form but is split perfectly in two to create a symmetrical image. Candi bentar characteristically has a stepped profile, which can be heavily decorated in the case of Balinese candi bentar. The two inner surfaces are always left sheer and unadorned as if the structure has been split in two.

There are several different styles of candi bentar, from the plain red brick structure of Majapahit-style with its derivations of Cirebon, Demak, Kudus, and early Mataram Sultanate style, to the stucco-coated split gates of Kaibon Palace in Banten, also in the cities of Surakarta and Yogyakarta, to the richly adorned split gates of Balinese temples and palaces compound.

Other than narrowing the passage, candi bentar do not serve a real defensive purpose, since this type of split gate is originally designed not to have doors. Additional iron fences are seldom to never installed in the passage, if so they are usually added later and not part of the original design. The symbolism of a candi bentar is unclear. Candi bentar probably only serve for aesthetic purpose, to create a sense of grandeur before entering a compound.

== Classical Javanese and Balinese Hindu temple ==
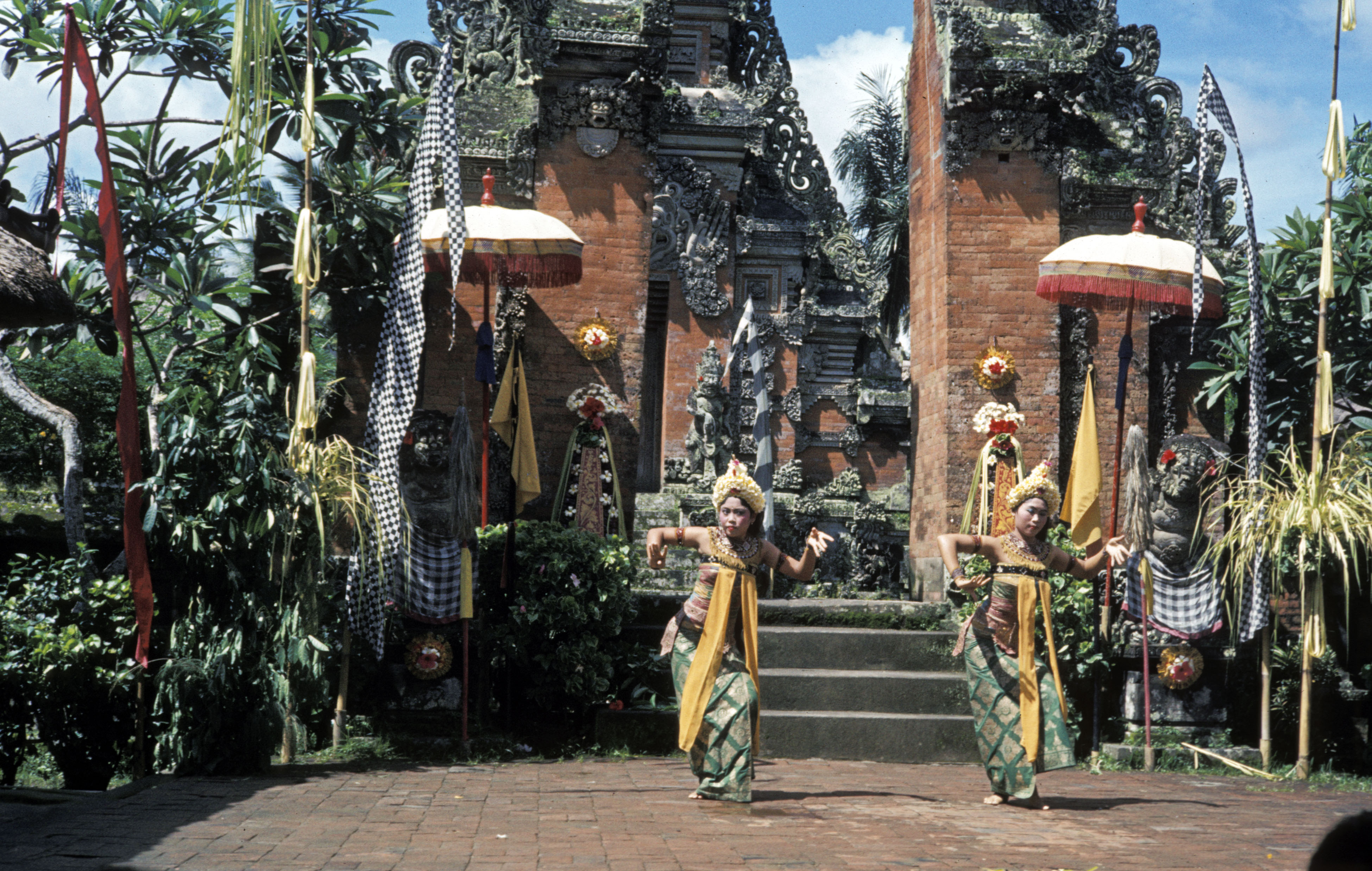
Balinese dance performance in front of candi bentar and paduraksa gates.

Candi bentar and paduraksa (another gateway structure) are integral features of Balinese temple architecture, and possibly the classical Javanese Hindu temple. Both gateways mark the threshold between different levels of sanctity within a temple compound. Candi bentar marks the boundary between the outer world with the outer realm of the Hindu temple, the nista mandala ("outer sanctum"). The paduraksa marks the boundary between the madya mandala ("middle sanctum") with the innermost and the most sacred utama mandala ("main sanctum").

The compound within Balinese temples and palaces is usually used for rituals. The candi bentar is usually used as a background of dance performances, as the performers appear from behind the split gates. Sometimes the dance performance took place in the inner compound with a roofed paduraksa gate as a background.

== Origin and evolution ==
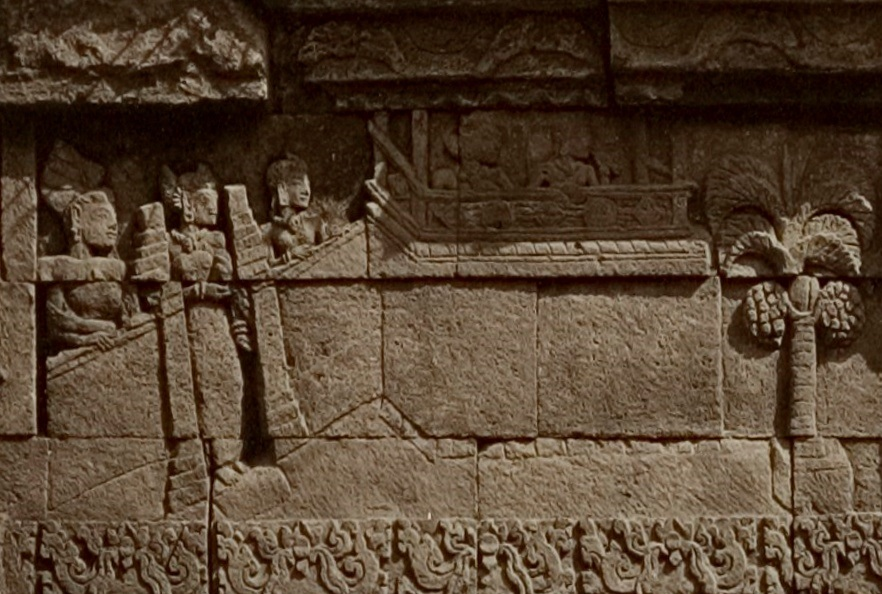
Reliefs from the main temple of the Panataran temple complex, depicting walls, small candi bentar split gate, and watch tower

Candi bentar is thought to date back to the Hindu period of Singhasari and Majapahit in 13th to 14th-century Java. Reliefs showing a candi bentar and paduraksa have been discovered in 13th-century Panataran temple and Candi Jago in East Java.

In the archaeological site of Trowulan – the 14th-century capital of the Majapahit empire – a candi bentar named Wringin Lawang (Javanese "the Banyan Tree Gate"), is among the oldest candi bentar that still stands. The Wringin Lawang took the shape of a typical Majapahit temple structure evenly split into two mirroring structures, creating a passage in the center. The grand gate portals are made from red brick, with a base of 13 x 11 metres and a height of 15.5 metres.

The current prevalence of candi bentar is probably owed to the influence of Majapahit aesthetics on Javanese and Balinese architecture. The candi bentar was still widely used upon the arrival of the Islam period in the 15th century. The Sultanate palace of The Keraton Kasepuhan used candi bentar to mark access into the public audience pavilion.

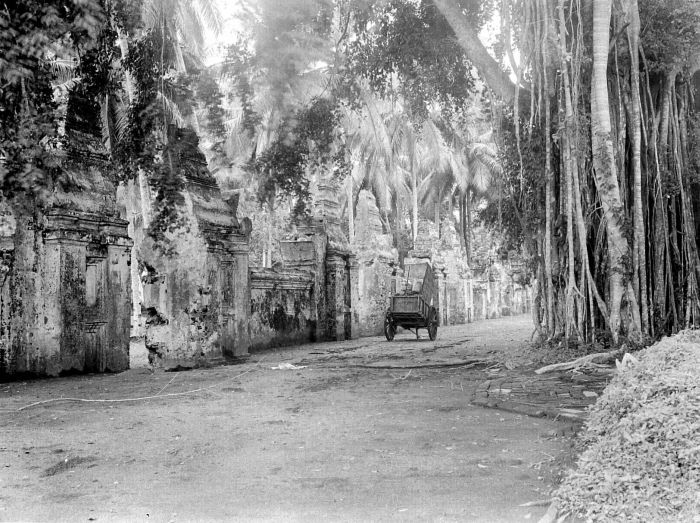
A row of candi bentars at Kaibon Palace, Banten.

The 16th-century Menara Kudus Mosque, one of the oldest mosques in Java, still has a candi bentar in its compound, marking the gateway into the mosque compound. A Muslim cemetery complex of Sendang Duwur in the village of Sendang Duwur, Lamongan Regency, East Java, contains both candi bentar and paduraksa to mark the level of sanctity within the cemetery complex, with the tomb of Sunan Sendang Duwur being the most sacred part of the cemetery complex. Other Javanese tombs employing the candi bentar is the Sunan Giri cemetery complex.

In the modern period, the construction of candi bentar is encouraged by the Indonesian government. This policy is especially encouraged by municipal and regional kabupaten governments as a form of regional identity. The government of Banten province, for example, encouraged the construction of candi bentar — modelled after Kaibon Palace of Old Banten, in the entrance gate of houses, especially those located along the main road. In the city of Cirebon, West Java, the red brick candi bentar has become the identity of the city.

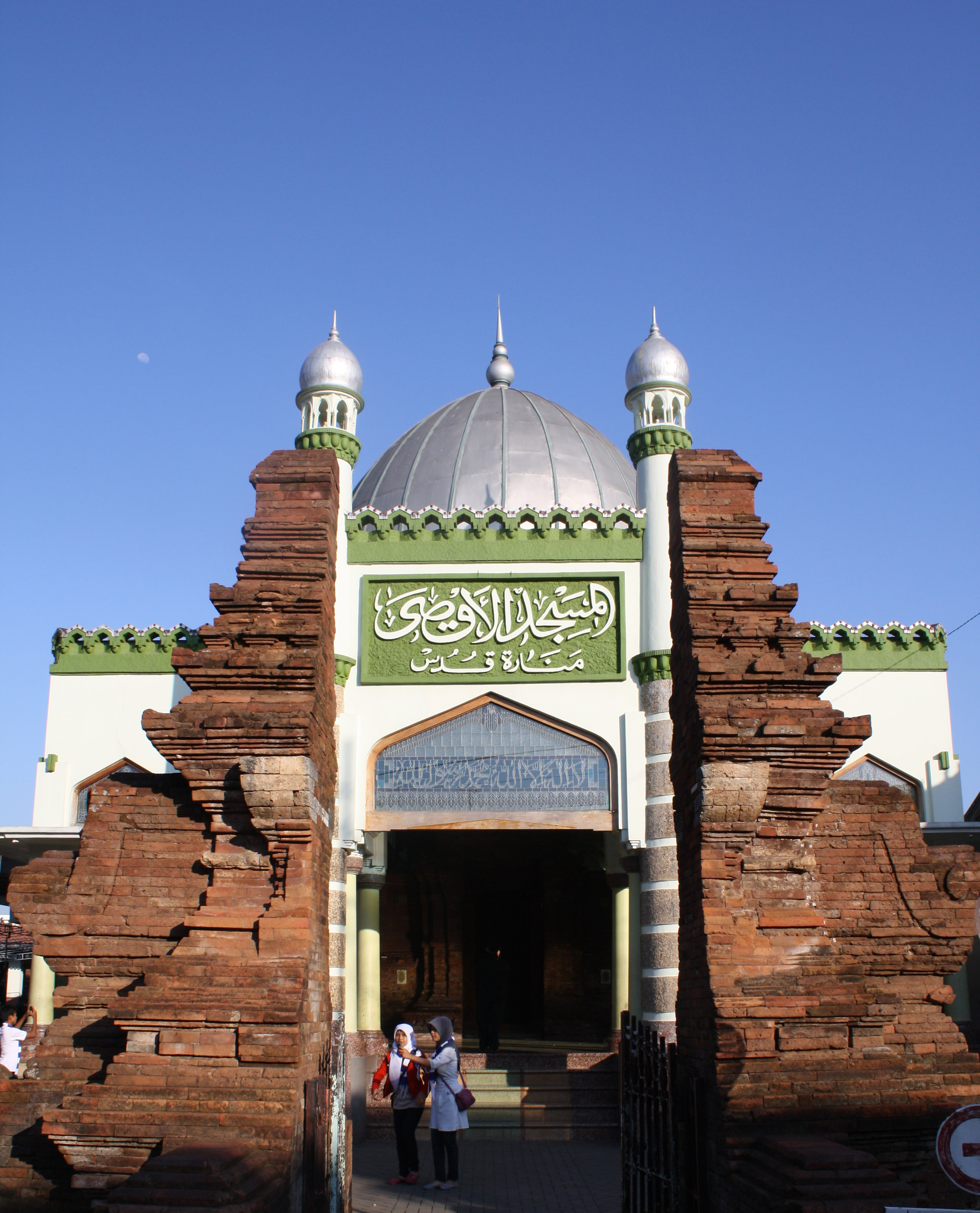
The Majapahit style candi bentar of Menara Kudus Mosque.

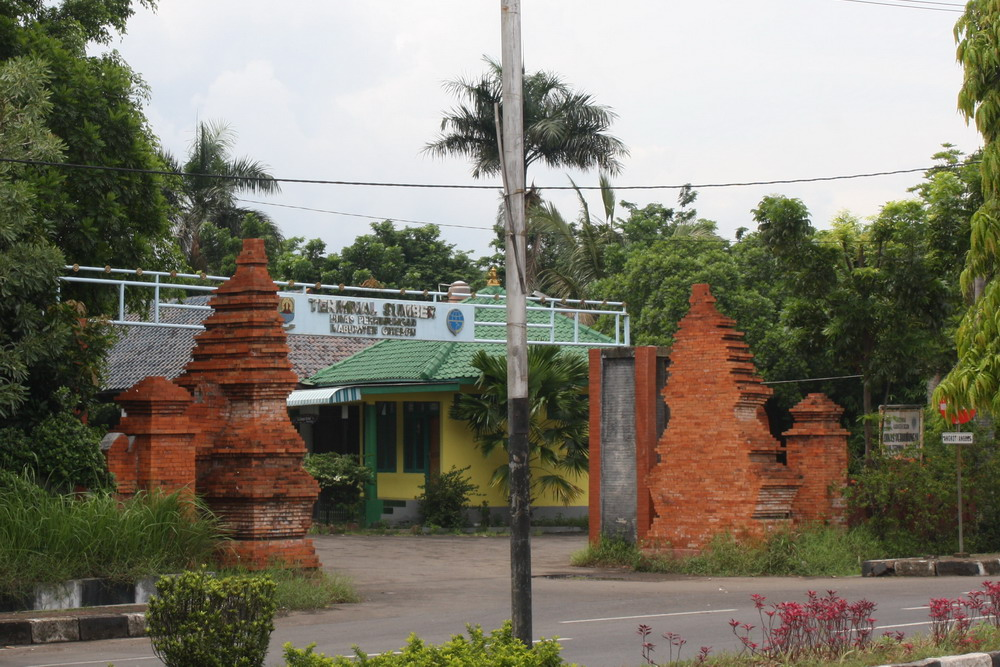
A Cirebon-style candi bentar as a gate of bus terminal in Cirebon.

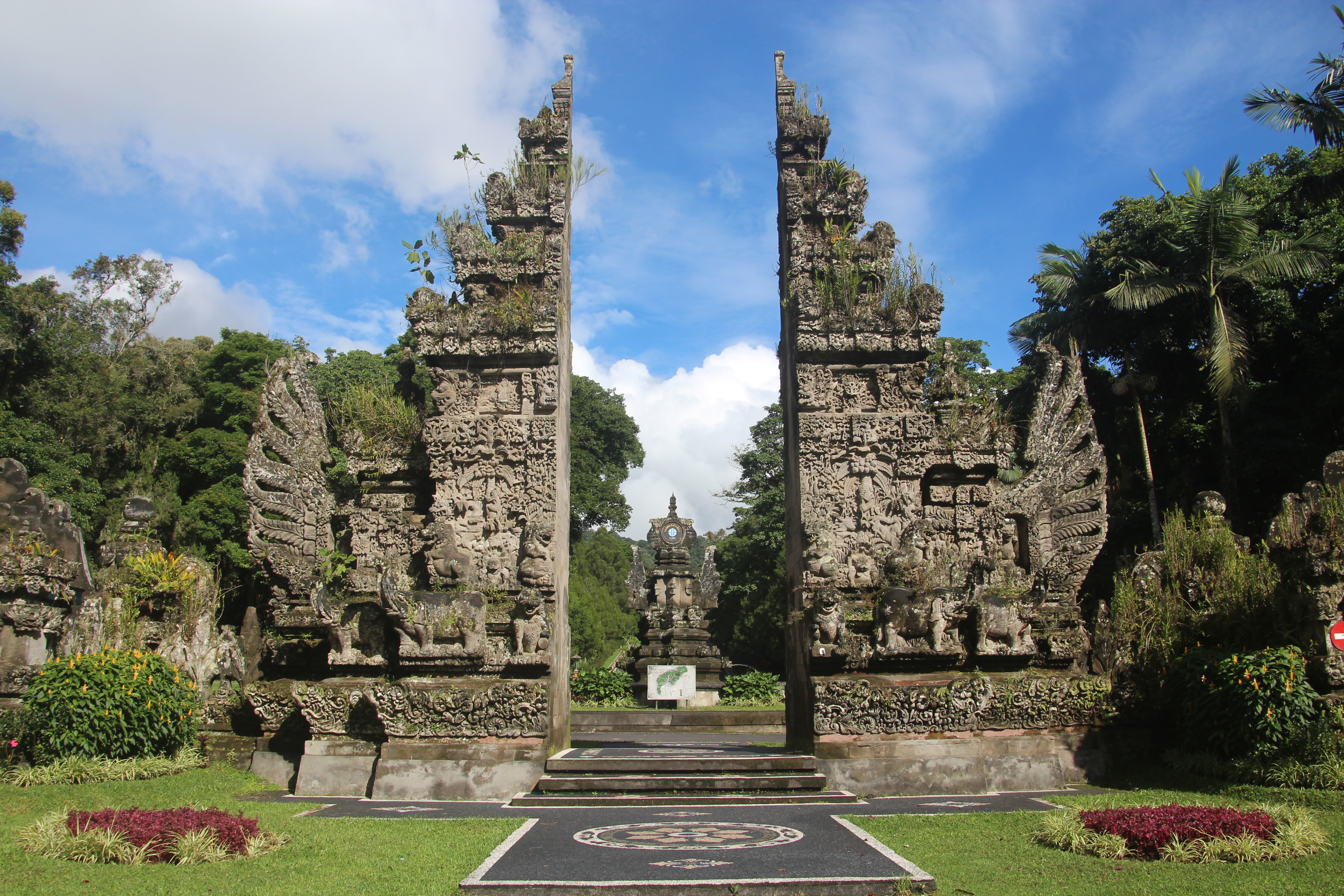
A Candi bentar in Kebun Raya Bali

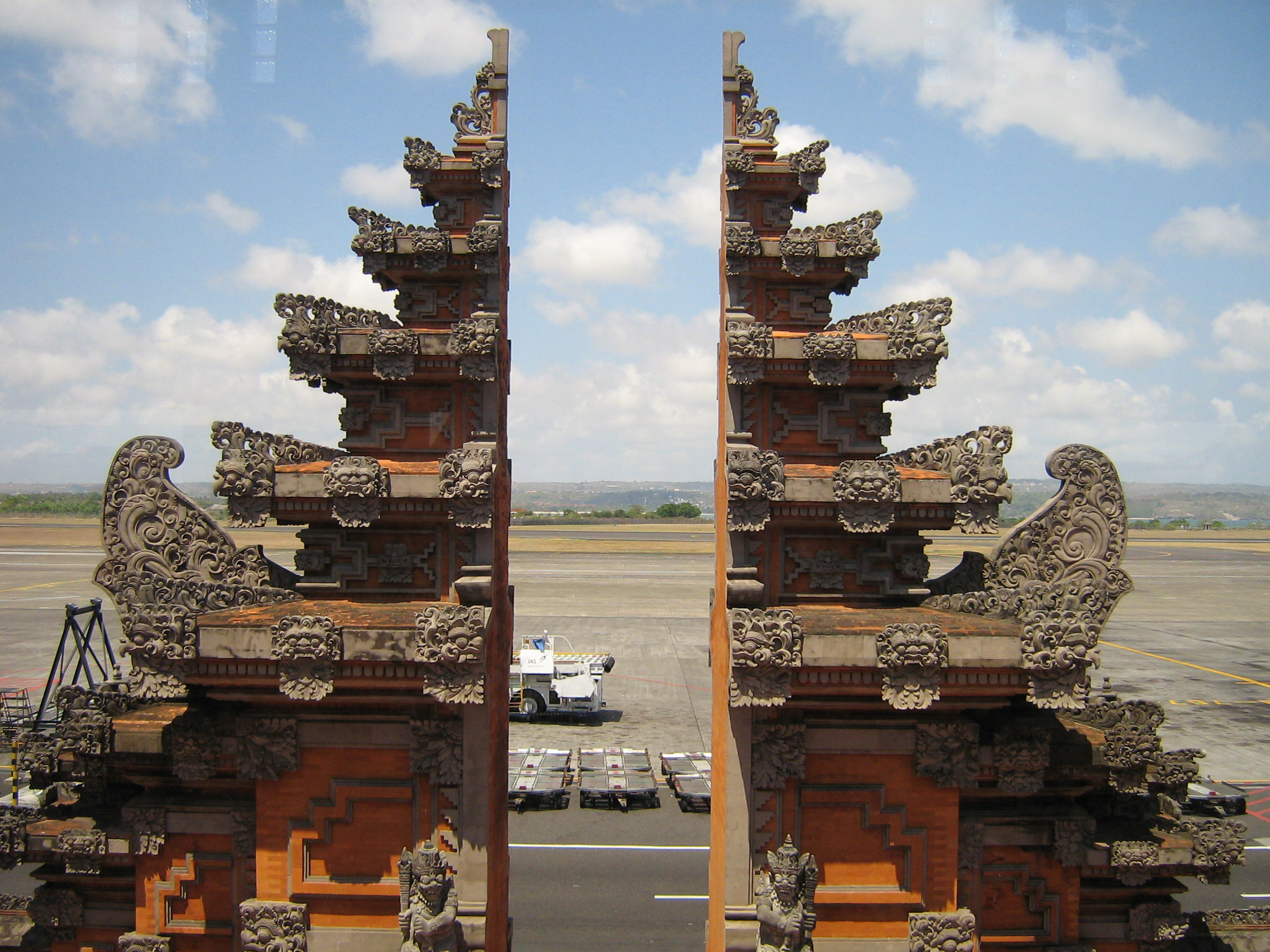
A Candi bentar in Ngurah Rai International Airport, Bali

== See also ==
- Balinese temple
- Architecture of Indonesia
- Gopuram, gates in Indian Hindu temples

== Cited works ==
- Davison, Julian (2003). Balinese architecture. Singapore: Tuttle Publishing. ISBN 9780794600716.
- Uka Tjandrasasmita (2009). Arkeologi Islam Nusantara [Nusantara Islamic Archeology]. Jakarta: Kepustakaan Populer Gramedia. ISBN 9789799102126.
- Wardani, Laksmi Kusuma; Sitindjak, Ronald Hasudungan Irianto; Mayang Sari, Sriti (2015). "Estetika Ragam Hias Candi Bentar dan Paduraksa di Jawa Timur" [Ornament aesthetic of Candi Bentar and Paduraksa in East Java] (PDF) (in Indonesian). Petra Christian University. Archived from the original (PDF) on November 23, 2018.
