= Penataran =

Hindu temple in Indonesia

Candi Penataran Penataran Temple
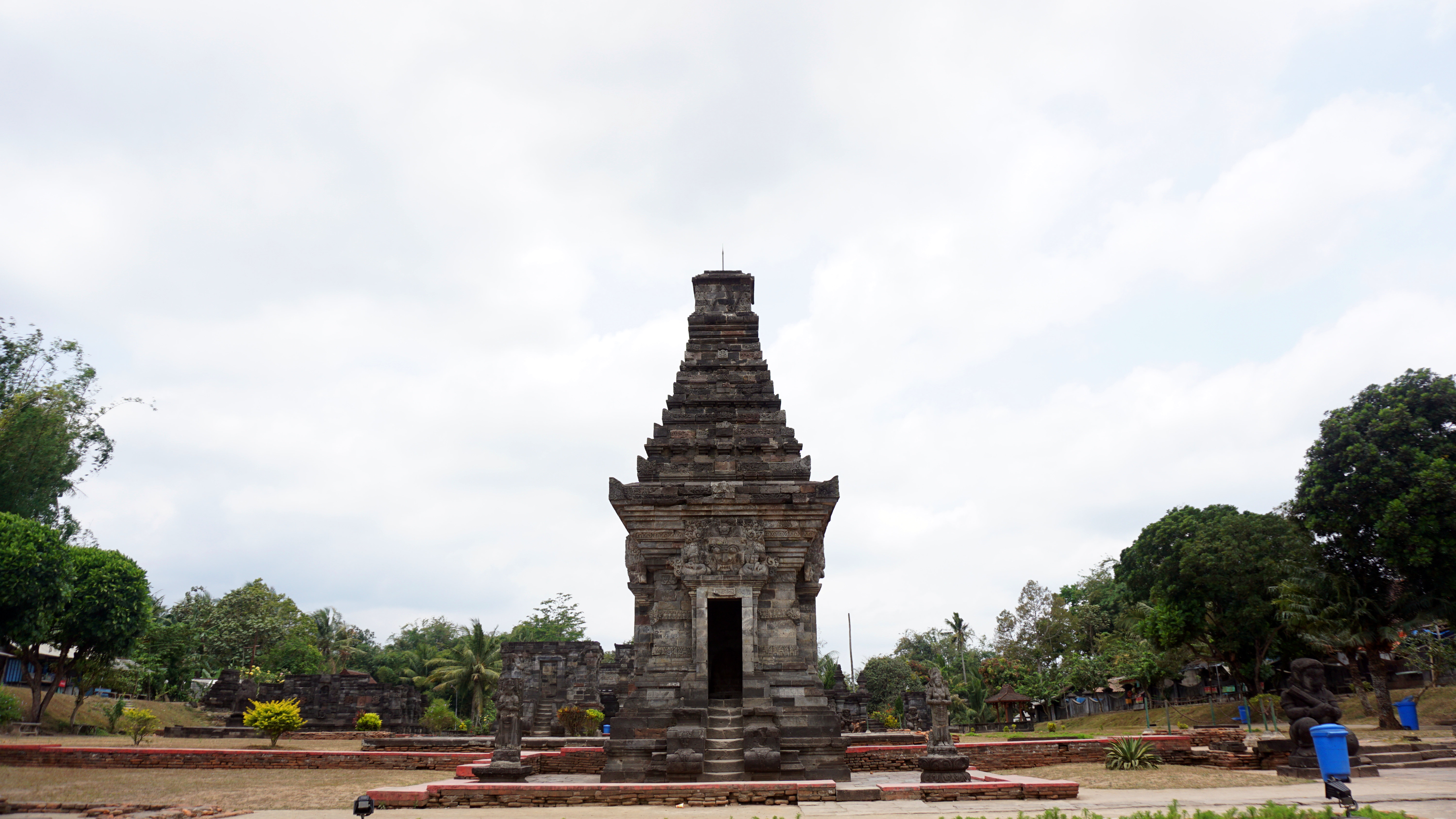
- Interactive map of the Candi Penataran; Penataran Temple area

General information
- Location: Blitar Regency, East Java, Indonesia
- Coordinates: 8°0′58″S 112°12′33″E
- Construction started: 12th–15th century

Penataran or Panataran (Indonesian: Candi Penataran) is one of the largest Hindu temple ruins complexes in East Java, Indonesia. It is located in Penataran, Blitar Regency, roughly 12 km northeast of Blitar, on the lower southwestern slopes of the Kelud volcano. Believed to have been constructed between the 12th and the 15th centuries, the temple played a significant role in the Majapahit Kingdom, especially under King Hayam Wuruk. He considered it his favorite sanctuary. The temple is also mentioned in the Nagarakretagama. The construction of the Penataran temple complex started in 1197, in the Kediri era.

The arrangement of the courtyards of temple complex resembles the arrangement used in the Balinese puras. It consists of three courtyards that lie one behind the other. The most sacred structures are placed in the rear courtyard nearest to the mountain. The first courtyard contains two rectangular platforms above which originally roofs of thatch were constructed supported on wooden pillars. They provide suitable space for religious rituals and ceremonies. The smaller platform is richly decorated with mythical snakes, the so-called nagas. To the left of the entrance to the second courtyard a beautiful small stone temple is found, called the Dated Temple because a lintel inscribed with a date equivalent to 1323 was found in its neighborhood. The second courtyard itself contains the Naga Temple devoted to the nagas. The main temple is found in the rear courtyard. It is decorated with reliefs about Rama and Krishna. It is good to realize that we find only stone remnants on this site. Wooden and other perishable buildings and objects are lost, but the reliefs of the Borobudur and the Shiva temple near Prambanan in Central Java disclose that they have existed. Remarkably enough, there are no stones found at the complex, which could have been used for making a stone roof on the main temple. Therefore some scholars believe that the stone remnant of the main temple was covered with a wooden frame covered with palm fibers or thatch grass and that consisted of a set of roofs with a stepped reduction similar to the tiered roofs found in present-day Bali. There exists on the island of Bali a similar temple, the Pura Yeh Gangga, near the village of Perean, dating from 1334, and therefore from the same time as the main temple of Panataran, which has a comparable substructure and is covered by a tiered roof just as many other puras in Bali. The advantage of a roof like this is that it is easy to repair after an earthquake, a phenomenon occurring frequently both in Java and Bali. According to the Indonesian scholar R. Soekmono the central shrine was empty. It did not contain any divine image. This means that this sanctuary is one of the temples in which the transition has taken place from the classical temple type with a stone roof to the temple type currently common in Bali with a roof not constructed with stone.

The main temple is dedicated to Shiva (Siwa). It is notable for including one of the largest Indonesian collections of reliefs showing the life stories of the Hindu god Vishnu in different avatars. It includes the Rama story of the Javanese version of the Ramayana epic, as well as the Krishna story as depicted in Triguna's Krishnayana epic poem. In this way the Candi Panataran follows the tradition of the Siva temple near Prambanan in Central Java, which also has magnificent reliefs presenting the story of the Ramayana.

== World Heritage status ==
This site was added to the UNESCO World Heritage Tentative List on October 19, 1995, in the Cultural category. This temple was identified in Nagarakretagama as Palah temple and reported being visited by King Hayam Wuruk during his royal tour across East Java. The site is being considered to be put on the World Heritage list of sites that have "outstanding universal value" to the world. However, in 2015, the site was pulled out from the tentative list along with 11 other sites.

== Gallery ==
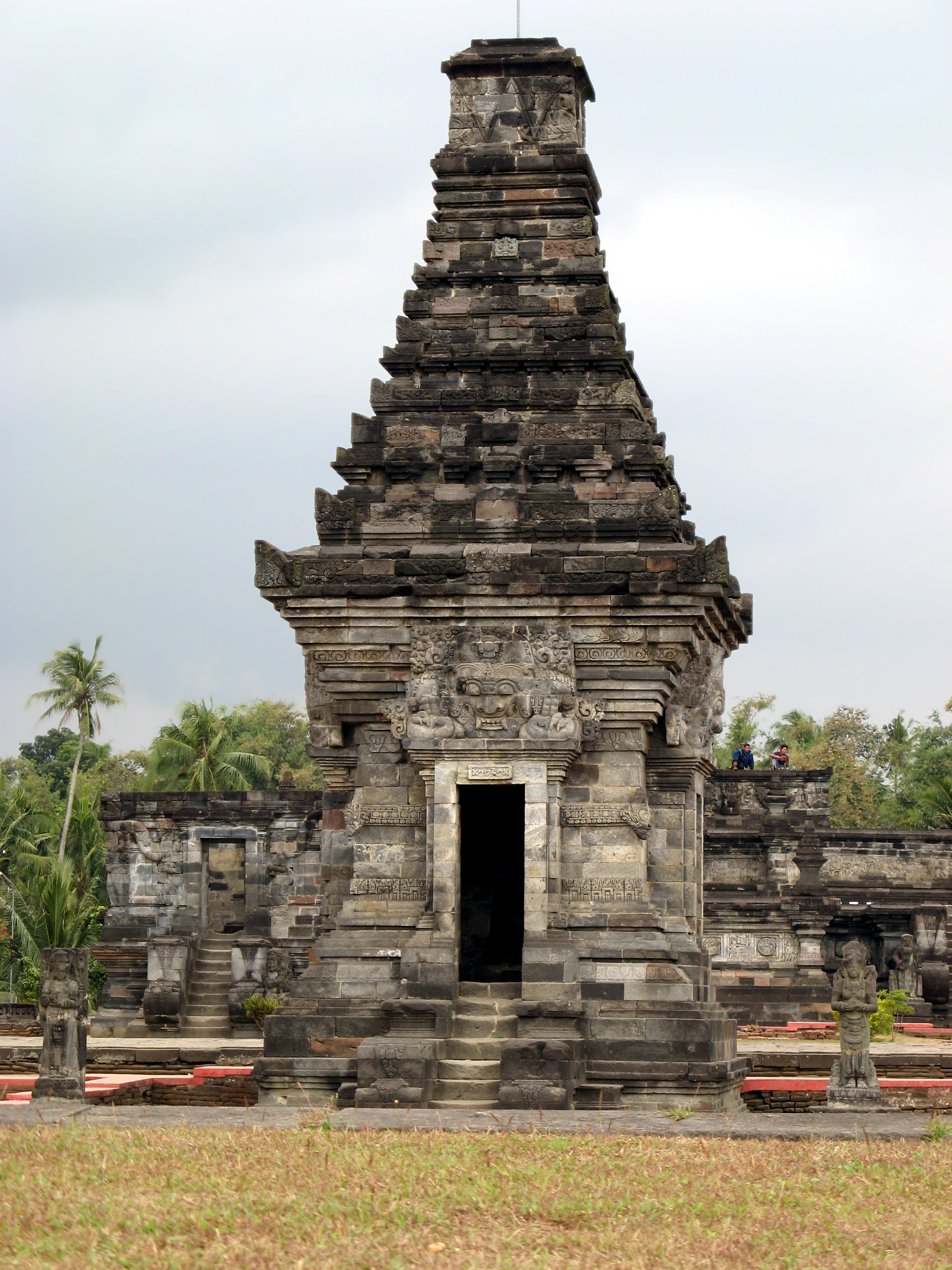
Dated Temple, dated in 1369

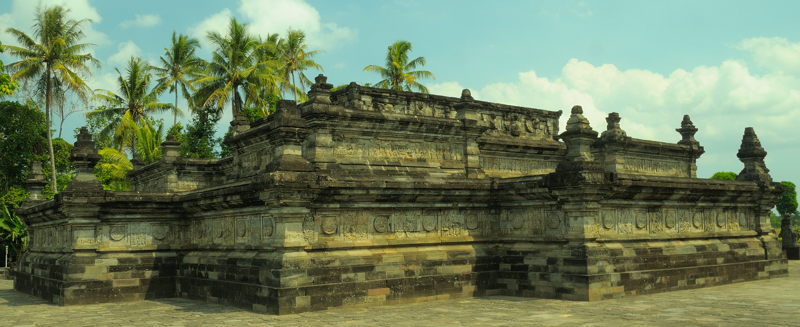
Substructure of the Main Temple containing a Ramayana relief

Part of the Ramayana relief

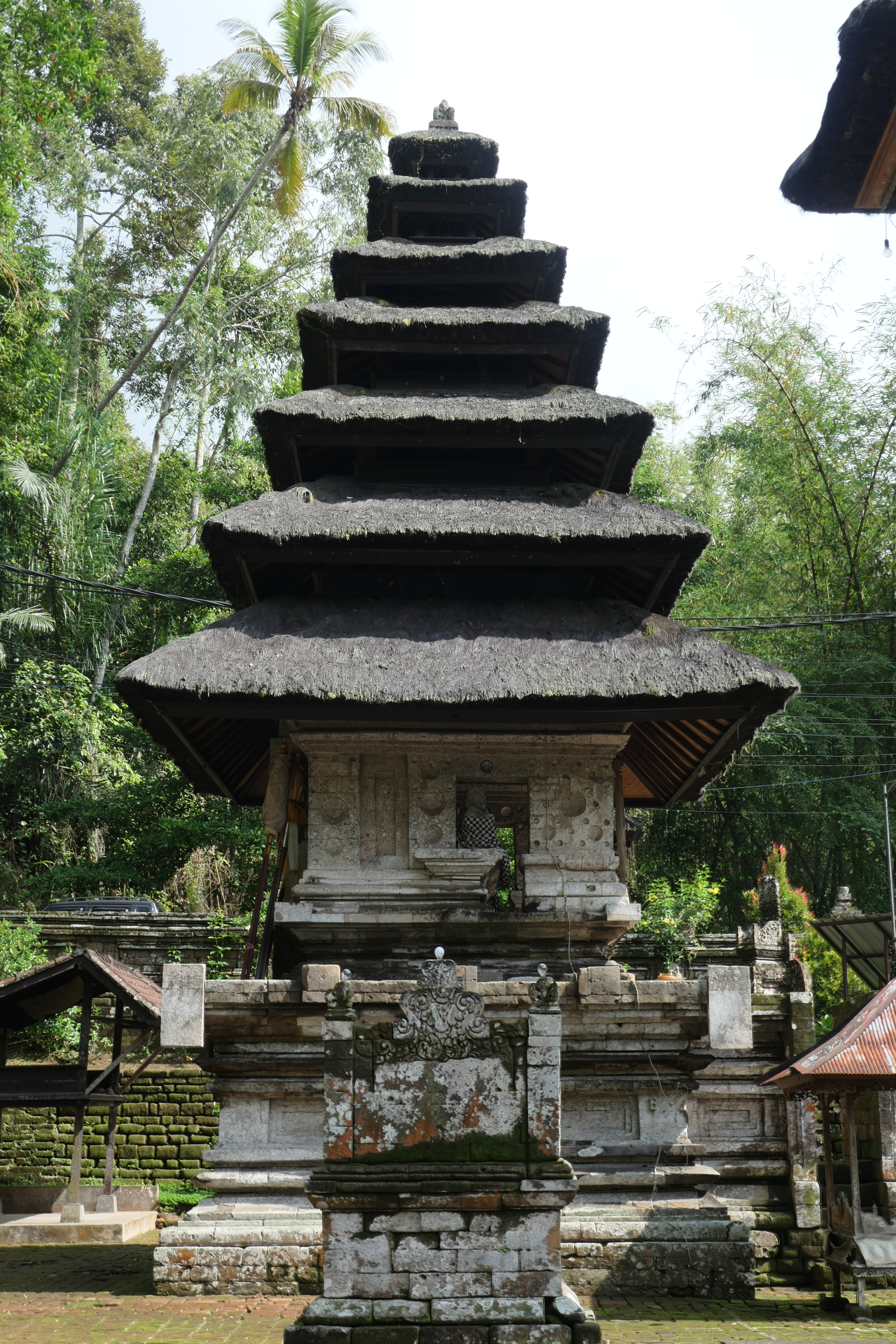
Pura Yeh Gangga in Bali

== See also ==
- Angkor Wat
- Bali
- Hinduism in Indonesia
