= Blitar Regency =

Regency in East Java, Indonesia

Blitar Regency Kabupaten Blitar
- Regency

Other transcription(s)
  - Javanese: Blitar (Gêdrig) بليتار (Pégon) ꦧ꧀ꦭꦶꦠꦂ (Hånåcåråkå)
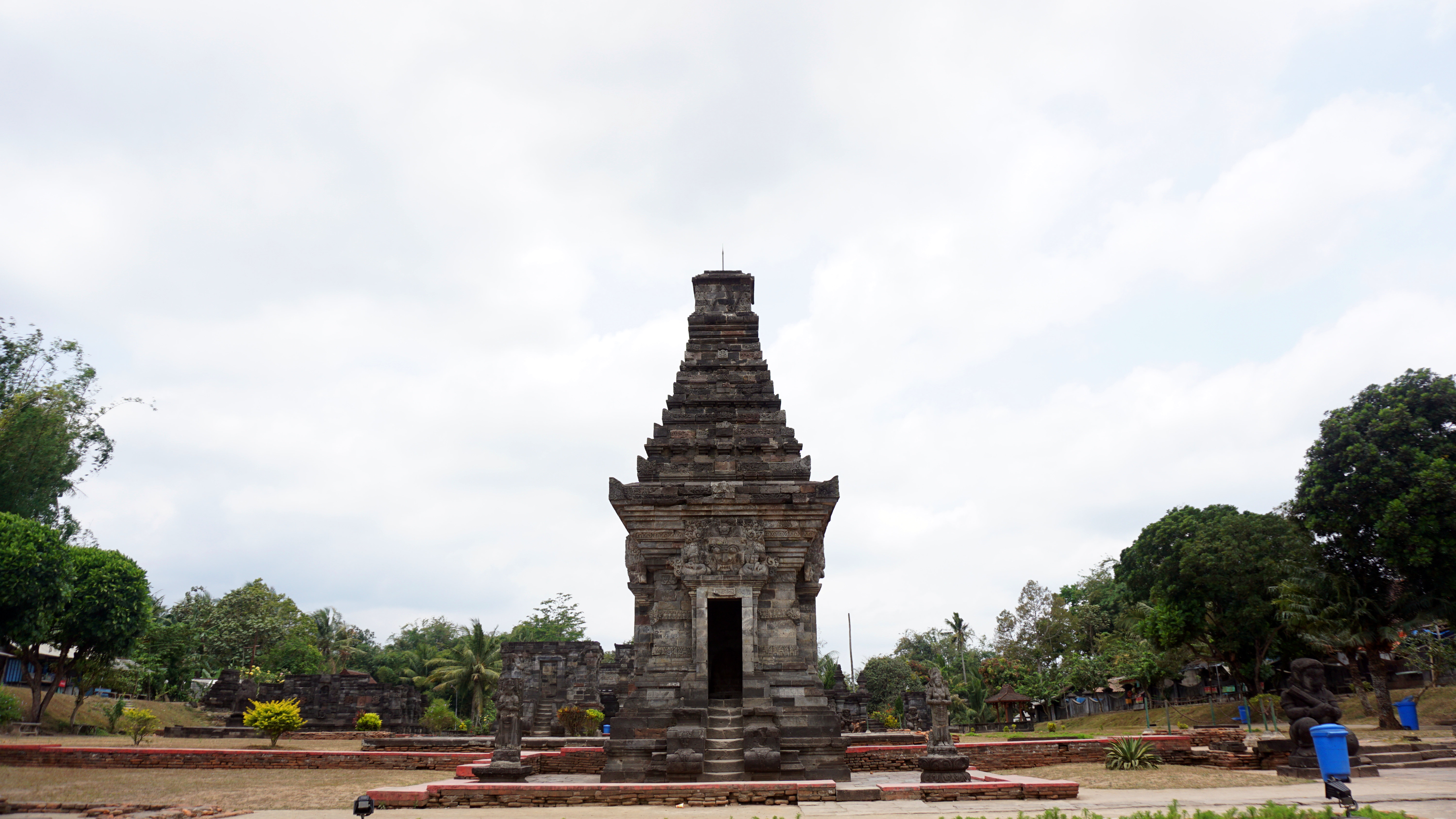

- Coat of arms
- Motto: Hurub Hambangun Praja "The Spirit Build Country"
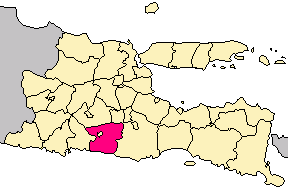
- Location within East Java

- Location in Java and Indonesia Blitar Regency (Indonesia)
- Coordinates: 8.13333°S 112.25°E
- Country: Indonesia
- Province: East Java
- Anniversary: 5 August 1324
- Capital: Kanigoro

Government
  - Regent: Rijanto
  - Vice Regent: Beky Herdihansah

Area
  - Total: 1,588.79 km^{2} (613.44 sq mi)

Population (mid 2025 estimate)
  - Total: 1,268,369
  - Density: 798.324/km^{2} (2,067.65/sq mi)
- Time zone: UTC+7 (IWST)
- Area code: (+62) 342
- Website: blitarkab.go.id

Blitar Regency (Javanese: ꦧ꧀ꦭꦶꦠꦂ) is a regency in East Java, Indonesia. It covers an area of 1,588.79 km^{2} and had a population of 1,116,639 at the 2010 Census and 1,223,745 at the 2020 Census; the official estimate as at mid 2025 was 1,268,369 (comprising 636,927 males and 631,442 females). These figures exclude Blitar city, which is now a separate administrative entity, enclaved within the regency but completely independent from it. Since 2010, the regency's administrative centre has been located in the town of Kanigoro, after sharing the same capital with Blitar city for more than a century.

== History ==
Blitar Regency as an administrative area is believed to be established in 5 August 1324 AD, during the reign of King Jayanegara (1309-1328).

== Administrative districts ==
Blitar Regency (excluding the city) is divided into twenty-two districts (kecamatan), tabulated below with their areas and their population totals from the 2010 Census and the 2020 Census, together with the official estimates as at mid 2025. The table also includes the number of administrative villages in each district (totaling 220 rural desa and 28 urban kelurahan), and its postal codes. The districts are in each case named after their administrative centre; they are grouped into southern and northern sectors, which have no administrative or legal significance, but highlight the much lower density in the south of the regency (adjoining the sea) compared with the north (centred on Blitar city).

Kode Wilayah	Name of District (kecamatan)	Area in km^{2}	Pop'n Census 2010	Pop'n Census 2020	Pop'n Estimate mid 2025	No. of villages	Post code
35.05.05	Bakung	111.24	25,011	27,335	28,961	11	66163
35.05.08	Wonotirto ^{(a)}	164.54	35,253	37,920	40,569	8	66173
35.05.13	Panggungrejo ^{(b)}	119.54	40,551	42,297	44,509	10	66174
35.05.20	Wates ^{(c)}	68.76	27,688	30,151	31,576	8	66194
35.05.16	Binangun	76.79	42,717	45,862	47,688	12	66193
35.05.12	Sutojayan	44.20	46,837	51,076	52,787	11 ^{(d)}	66172
35.05.04	Kademangan	105.28	63,519	69,712	72,476	15 ^{(e)}	66161
	Totals - South sector	689.85	281,576	304,360	318,566	75	
35.05.10	Kanigoro	55.55	72,919	81,769	81,916	12 ^{(f)}	66171
35.05.14	Talun	49.78	59,167	65,419	67,171	14 ^{(g)}	66183
35.05.22	Selopuro	39.29	39,319	43,900	45,802	8	66184
35.05.19	Kesamben	56.96	48,418	53,033	54,925	10	66191
35.05.21	Selorejo	52.23	34,784	38,617	40,084	10	66192
35.05.18	Doko	70.95	37,648	40,701	42,417	10	66186
35.05.17	Wlingi	66.36	49,902	53,719	55,494	9 ^{(h)}	66185
35.05.15	Gandusari	88.23	66,337	73,240	76,591	14	66187
35.05.11	Garum	65.56	62,025	68,313	69,768	9 ^{(i)}	66182
35.05.09	Nglegok	92.56	67,479	74,807	76,736	11 ^{(e)}	66181
35.05.07	Sanankulon	33.33	53,040	57,528	57,810	12	66151
35.05.06	Ponggok	103.83	96,783	108,169	113,986	15	66153
35.05.03	Srengat	53.98	62,071	67,715	70,462	16 ^{(j)}	66152
35.05.01	Wonodadi	40.35	45,830	49,097	51,379	11	66155
35.05.02	Udanawu	40.98	39,341	43,365	45,262	12	66154
	Totals - North sector	898.94	835,063	919,385	949,803	173	
	Totals - Regency	1,588.79	1,116,639	1,223,745	1,268,369	248	

Notes: (a) including 7 small offshore islands. (b) including 13 small offshore islands. (c) including 8 small offshore islands.
(d) comprising 7 kelurahan (Jegu, Jingglong, Kalipang, Kedungbunder, Kembangarum, Sukorejo and Sutojayan) and 4 desa.
(e) including one kelurahan - the administrative centre. (f) including 2 kelurahan (Kanigoro and Satreyan).
(g) comprising 4 kelurahan (Bajang, Kamulan, Kaweron and Talun) and 10 desa. (h) comprising 5 kelurahan (Babadan, Beru, Klemunan, Tangkil and Wlingi) and 4 desa.
(i) comprising 4 kelurahan (Bence, Garum, Sumberdiren and Tawangsari) and 5 desa. (j) comprising 4 kelurahan (Dandong, Kauman, Srengat and Togogan) and 12 desa.

== Temples ==
Because of its strategic location, Blitar has been important for religious activities in the past, especially Hindu. The most famous temple in this area is Candi Penataran located in Penataran village, Nglegok District. According to history, Candi Penataran used to be a temple state or the main temple of the kingdom. Candi Penataran was built when King Kertajaya offered sima to adore sira majesty of Lord Palah in the year 1119 Saka (1197 AD).

Other temples are scattered throughout Blitar, including :

- Candi Bacem
- Candi Gambar Wetan
- Candi Kalicilik
- Candi Kotes
- Candi Sawentar
- Candi Sumbernanas
- Candi Plumbangan
- Candi Simping
- Candi Tepas
- Candi Wringin Branjang

== Beaches ==
- Jolosutro Beach
- Pangi Beach
- Peh Pulo Beach
- Serang Beach
- Tambakrejo Beach
