= Paduraksa =

Type of gateway found in Indonesia

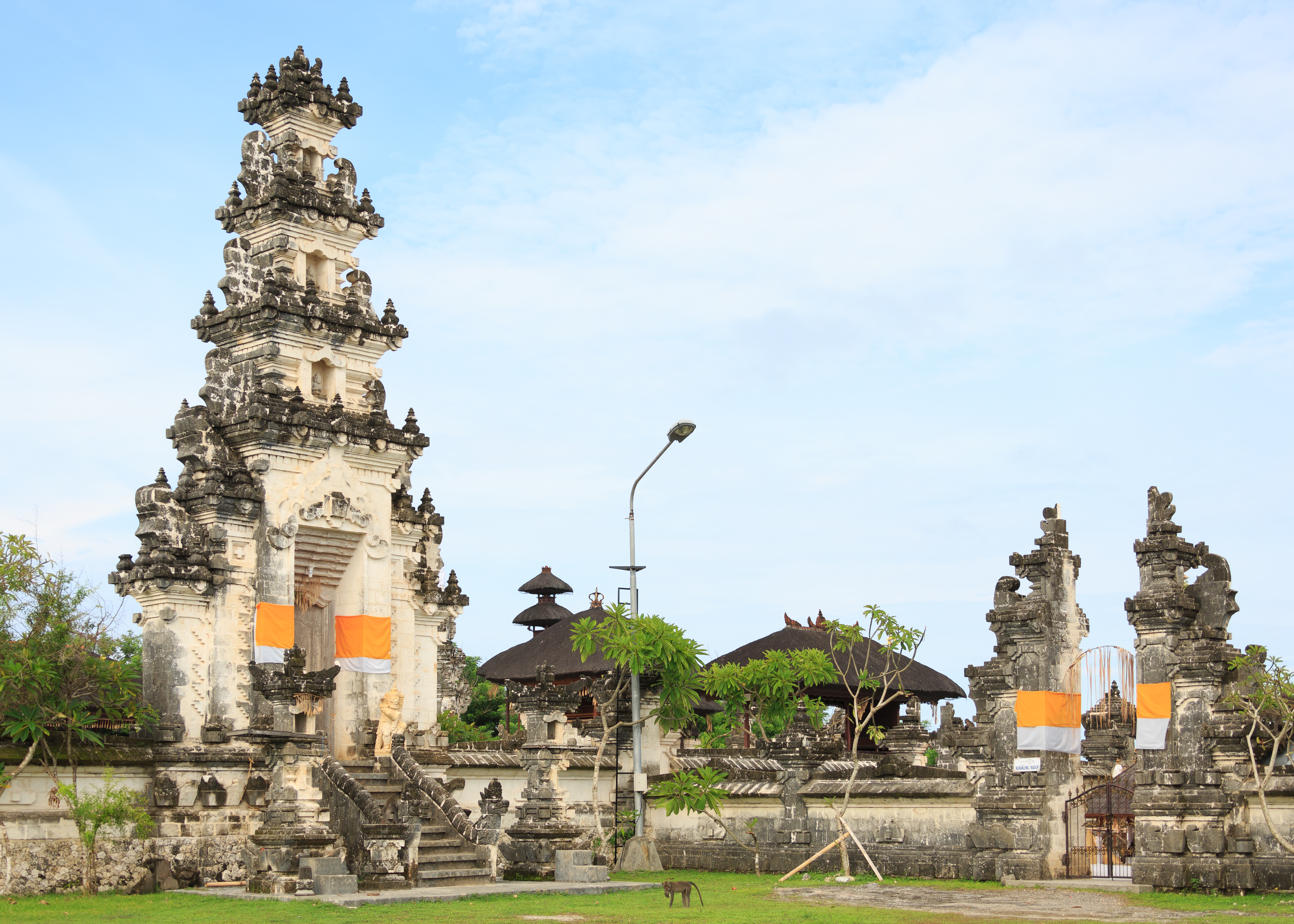
A paduraksa (left) marks the entrance into the main sanctum of the temple, while the candi bentar (right) marks the entrance into the outer sanctum of the temple.

Paduraksa, also known as kori, is a type of gateway covered with towering roofs that can be found in the islands of Java and Bali, Indonesia. This architectural feature is commonly found in buildings from the classical Hindu-Buddhist period of Indonesia. Paduraksa marks the threshold into the most sacred space (the inner sanctum) within a religious compound, a cemetery, or a palace. In Balinese architecture, an elaborately decorated towering paduraksa is often built as the temple's most imposing structure.

== Form ==
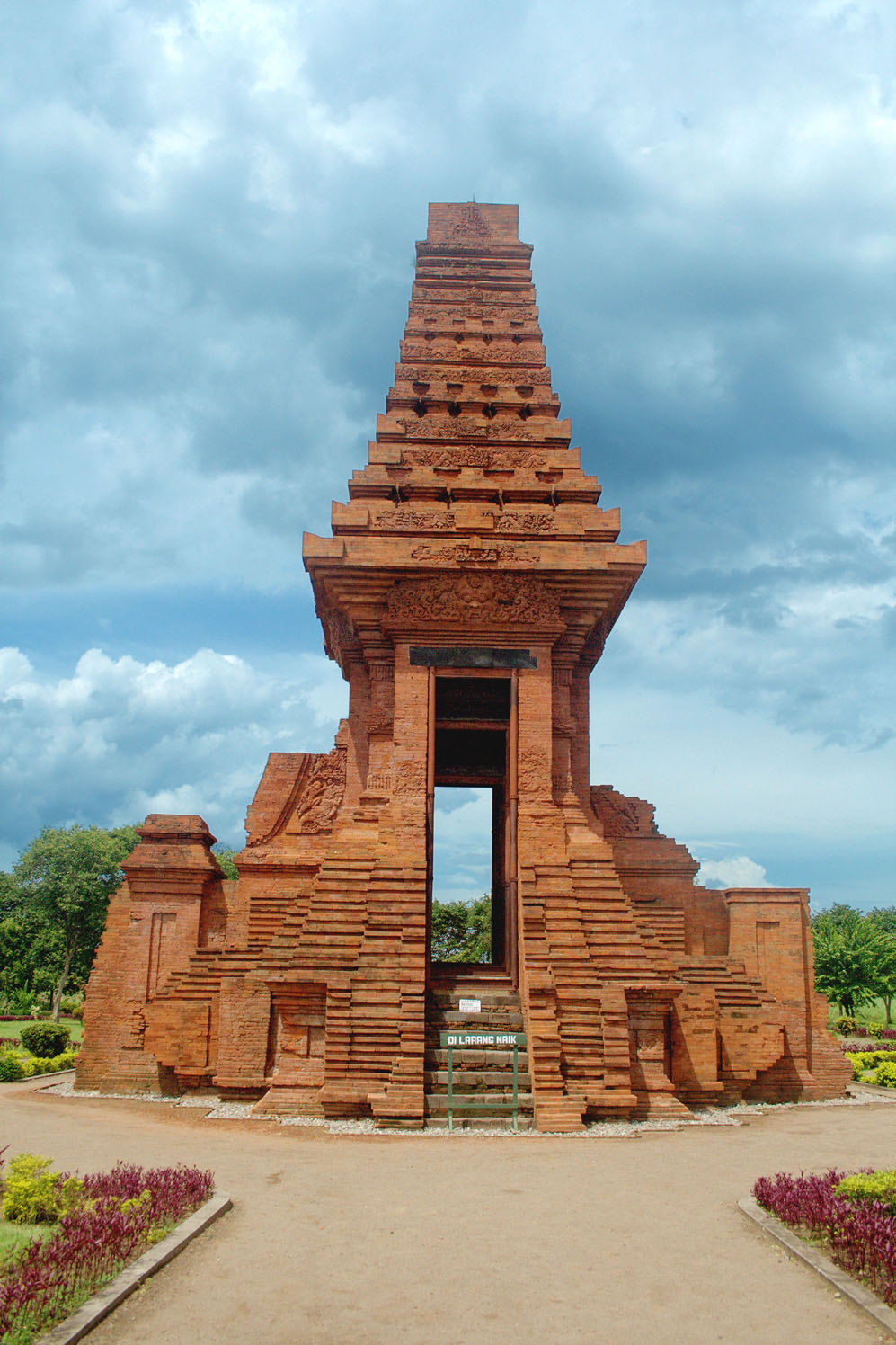
Bajang Ratu, a 13th-century paduraksa in Trowulan.

A paduraksa is a gateway in the form of a candi. The structure consists of three parts: the base, where a flight of steps is located; the body where the entrance opening is located; and the crown, with its stepped profile characteristic of a candi. The entrance opening is sometimes equipped with a door made of finely carved wood.

One of the oldest surviving paduraksa gates is Bajang Ratu in Trowulan, an elegant red-brick paduraksa gate dating from the mid-14th century Majapahit. The Bajang Ratu gate is adorned with bas-reliefs depicting the story of Sri Tanjung and Ramayana. The form of the structure is tall and slender, rising to a height of 16.5 metres and displaying intricate relief decoration, especially on the roof section.

While the basic form of a paduraksa is a stepped candi, it can be heavily decorated with ornaments, figures, and symbols. In Bali, the crown of the paduraksa is decorated with flame-like ornaments and celestial figures. The menacing head of the bhoma or fierce kala is often carved over the opening, while lion-like effigies, or a pair of fierce giants of dvarapalas, guard the sides of the entrance. Both menacing figures of kala's head and dvarapalas door guardians are believed to have protective property; to repel and drive away evil spirits from entering the compound.

The main kori that marks the threshold into the inner sanctum of the main shrine is known as the kori agung ("great kori"). A paduraksa in the Islamic cemetery complex of Sendang Duwur contains a mysterious wing-like feature thought to represent the wings of the meru; this might be associated with the celestial bird garuda.

== Classical Javanese and Balinese Hindu temple ==
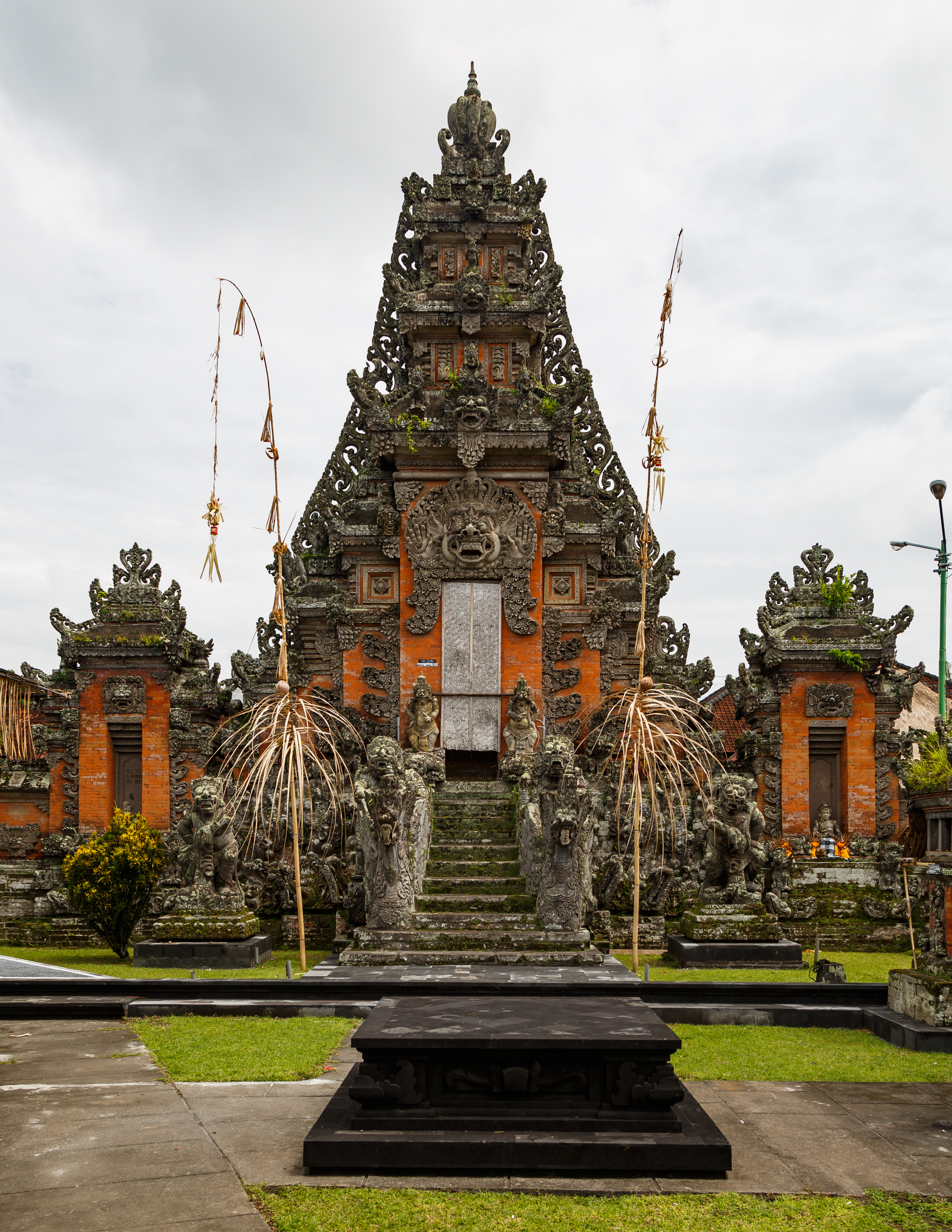
A highly ornate paduraksa in the Pura Puseh Desa Singapadu, Bali.

Paduraksa and candi bentar (another gateway feature) are integral features of a Balinese Hindu temple architecture, and possibly the classical Javanese Hindu temple. Both gateways mark the threshold between different levels of sanctity within a temple compound. In Bali, a candi bentar marks the boundary between the outer world with the outer realm of the Hindu temple, the nista mandala ("outer sanctum"), while the paduraksa marks the boundary between the madya mandala ("middle sanctum") with the innermost and the most sacred utama mandala ("main sanctum").

In Balinese temple architecture, a major temple usually has triple paduraksa gates, the main largest and tallest paduraksa, flanked by two smaller ones. Daily devotees and casual visitors usually use the side doors, while the main door is kept locked, except during religious festivals. In Bali, the paduraksa central gate is reserved for the priests and the gods.

== Origin and evolution ==
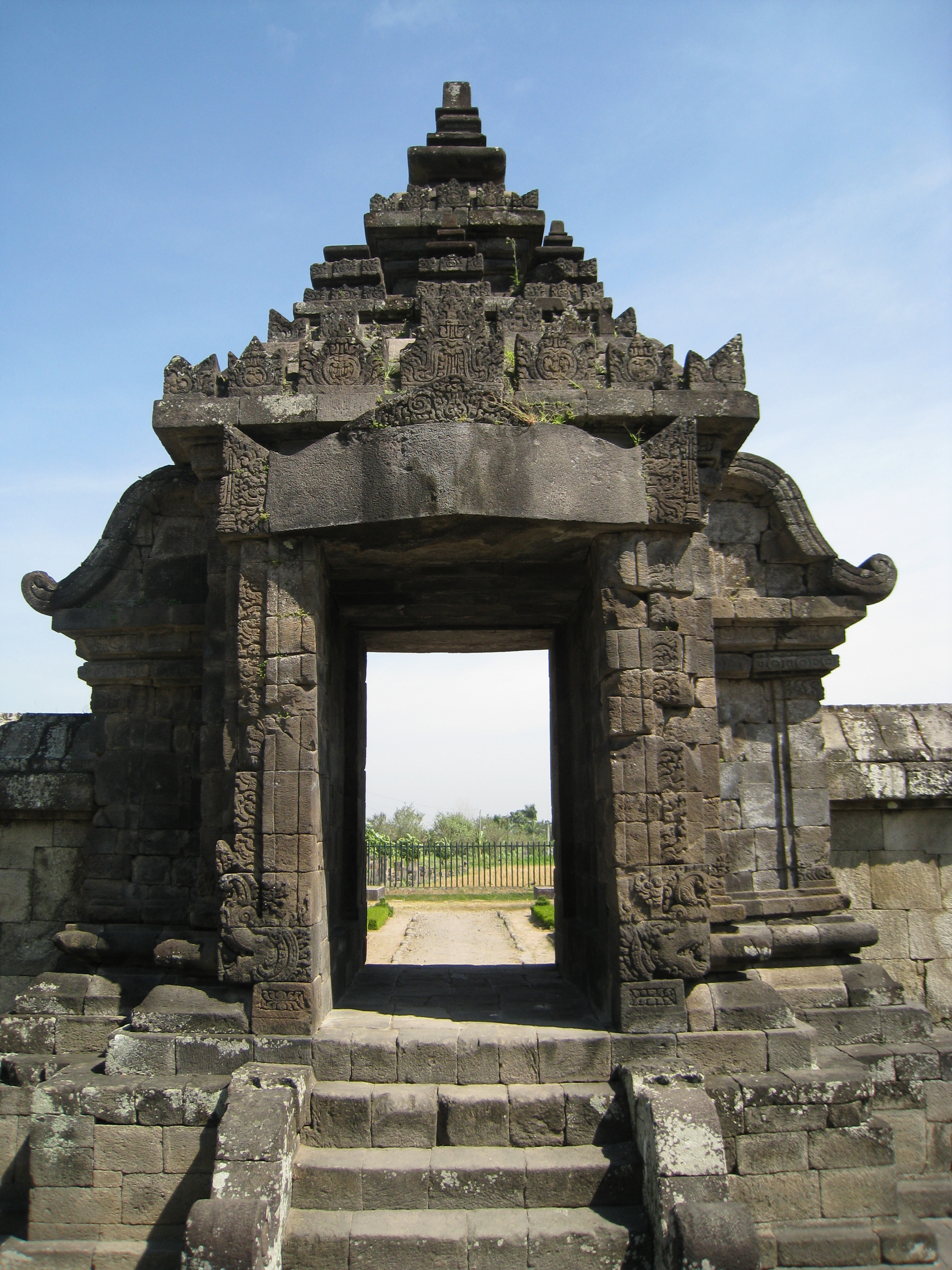
A paduraksa gate of Plaosan compound, 9th century.

The paduraksa is a classical Indonesian adaptation of the classical Indian gopuram. The early form of a Javanese roofed gateway can be found in a couple of 8th to 9th-century temple complexes in Central Java, e.g. Prambanan, Plaosan, and Ratu Boko. In the later period, these gateways took a more slender form. Reliefs showing a candi bentar and paduraksa have been discovered in 13th-century Candi Jago in East Java. The 13th- to 14th-century paduraksa of East Java, such as those found from the Hindu period of Singhasari and Majapahit, looks identical to the Balinese paduraksa. In the archaeological site of Trowulan – the 14th-century capital of the Majapahit empire – a paduraksa named Bajang Ratu (Javanese "dwarf/defect monarch"), is the oldest paduraksa that still stands.

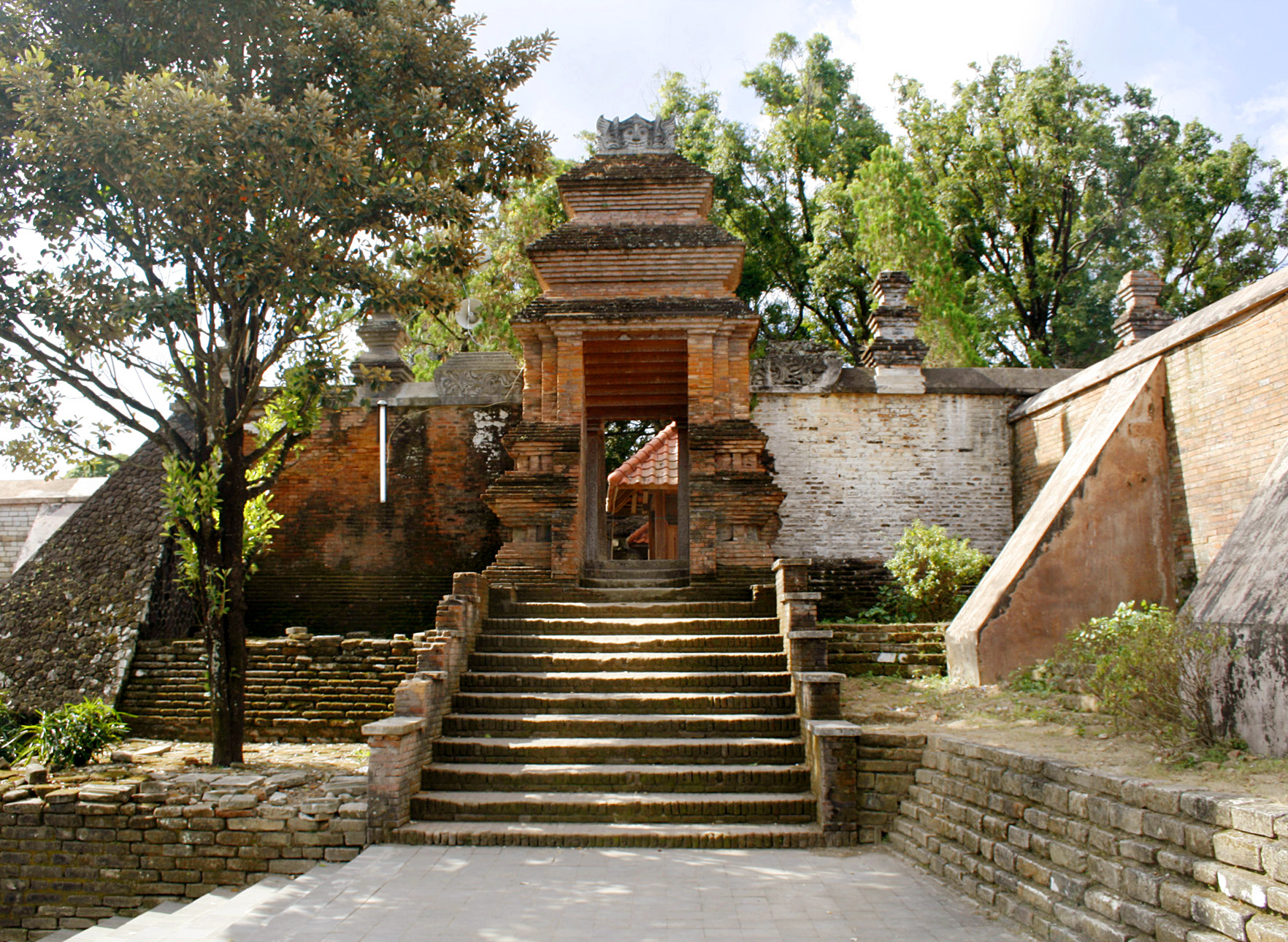
The kori gate of Kota Gede royal cemetery, 16th century.

The paduraksa is still widely used upon the arrival of the Islamic period in the 15th century. The name kori agung is usually chosen for a paduraksa which is used for non-Hindu purposes. The Great Mosque of Mataram (Mesjid Gedhe Mataram) in Kotagede contains a kori agung which marks the threshold into the mosque; where the tomb of Panembahan Senopati is located. The 16th-century Menara Kudus Mosque, one of the oldest mosques in Java, has a kori agung in its compound and a kori agung inside the mosque. Many Kraton (palace) complexes of Islamic Java use kori agung within their complex, e.g. within the Kraton Ngayogyakarta Hadiningrat of Yogyakarta Sultanate, Kraton Kasepuhan and Kanoman of Cirebon Sultanate and the ruined Kraton Kaibon of Banten Sultanate. Muslim cemetery complex also utilized the kori agung to mark the area where the tomb is located, e.g. in the Imogiri cemetery complex. The Sendang Duwur cemetery complex has two kori agungs with wing-like architectural forms, which are thought to represent a winged Meru.

== See also ==
- Architecture of Indonesia
- Gopuram, gates in Indian Hindu temples

== Sources ==
- Davison, Julian (2003). Balinese architecture. Singapore: Tuttle Publishing. ISBN 9780794600716.
- Miksic, John (1998). Gunawan Tjahjono (ed.). Architecture:Brick Architecture of Majapahit. Indonesian Heritage. Vol. 6. Singapore: Archipelago Press. ISBN 9813018305.
- Uka Tjandrasasmita (2009). Arkeologi Islam Nusantara [Nusantara Islamic Archeology]. Jakarta: Kepustakaan Populer Gramedia. ISBN 9789799102126.
- Wardani, Laksmi Kusuma; Sitindjak, Ronald Hasudungan Irianto; Mayang Sari, Sriti (2015). "Estetika Ragam Hias Candi Bentar dan Paduraksa di Jawa Timur" [Ornament aesthetic of Candi Bentar and Paduraksa in East Java] (PDF) (in Indonesian). Petra Christian University.
