= Balinese theatre =

Theatre art and dramas of Bali

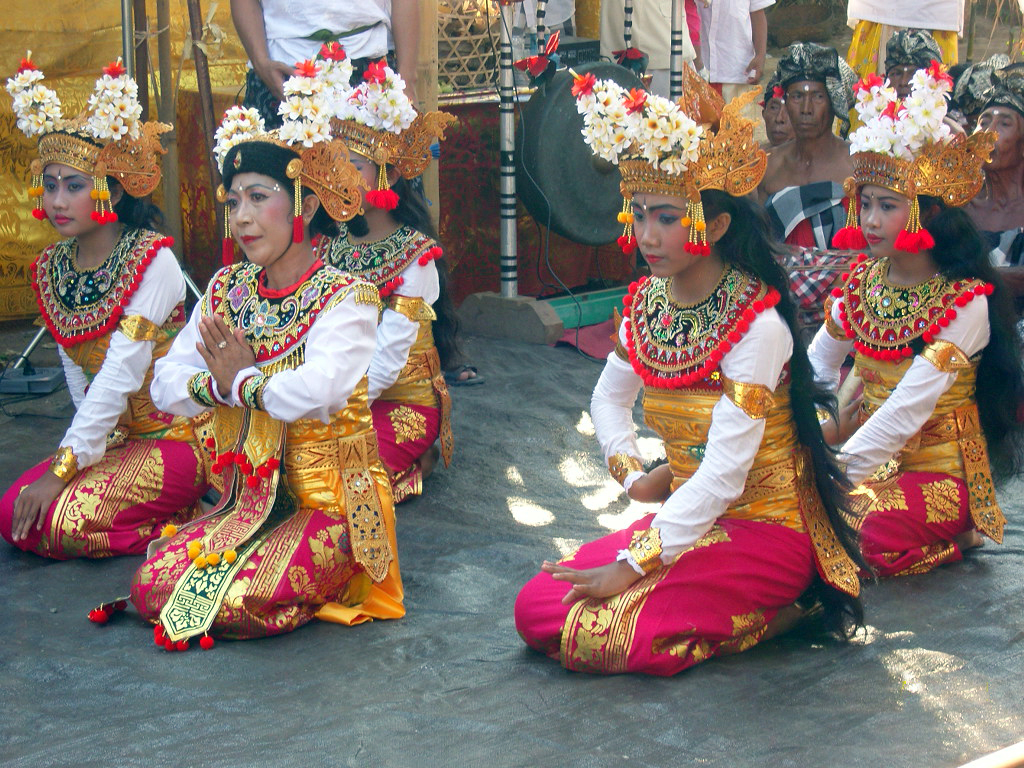
Gambuh performance in Budakeling, Bali

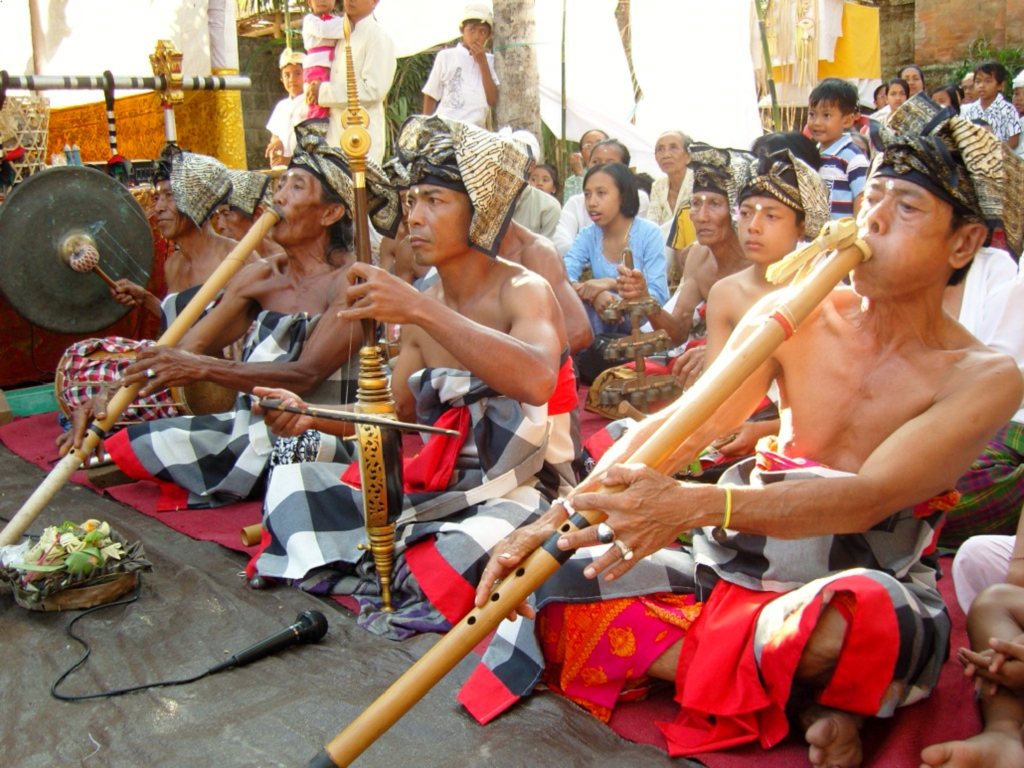
Gamelan orchestra for a Gambuh performance

Balinese theatre and dramas include Janger dance, pendet dance performances, and masked performances of Topèng. Performances are also part of funeral rituals involving a procession, war dance, and other rituals before the cremation of the patulangan. Balinese use the word sesolahan for both theatre and dance.

- Arja (dance), Balinese dance-opera
- Barong dance performances featuring Rangda, a dancer with keris, Jero Gede (black masked figures), and Jero Luh (white masked performers)

Barong Ket: lion barong, the most common Barong, is the symbol of a good spirit.
Barong Landung: giant barong, the form is similar to Betawi Ondel-Ondel
Barong Celeng: boar barong
Barong Macan: tiger barong
Barong Naga: dragon (or serpent)

- Gambuh plays with chanting and music including the use of long flute-like instruments
- Topèng, masked theatre
- Calonarang, performances at temples during times of danger or difficulty that involve stories
- Drama Gong, popular theatre developed in the late 1960s
- Sendratari, a group ballet form that emerged in the 1960s includes a dhalang puppeteer giving dialogue and often a gamelan (orchestra), Sendratari, or Kècak chant

Javanese Wayang shadow plays are performed in Bali.

== Gallery ==
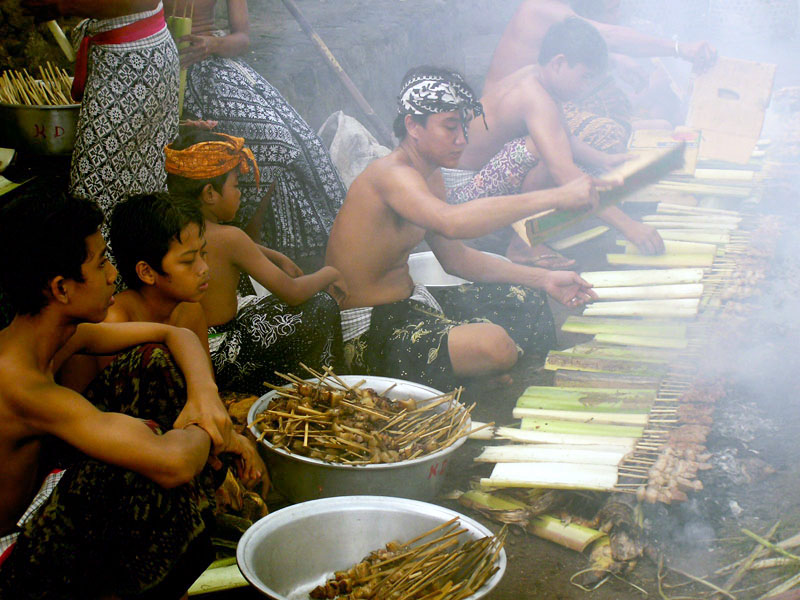
Preparing the feast before a Pandan War performance in Tenganan village, Karangasem Regency, Bali

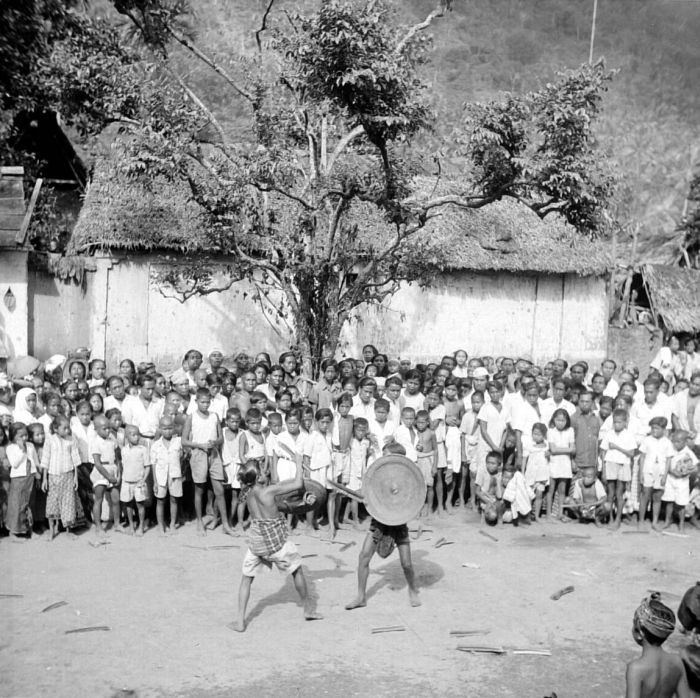
Staged battle in Tenganan

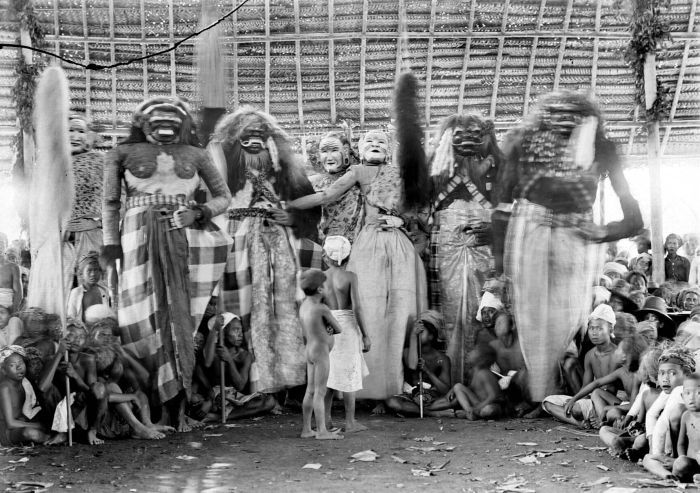
Actors dressed as giants and evil spirits for a Barong Landung performance

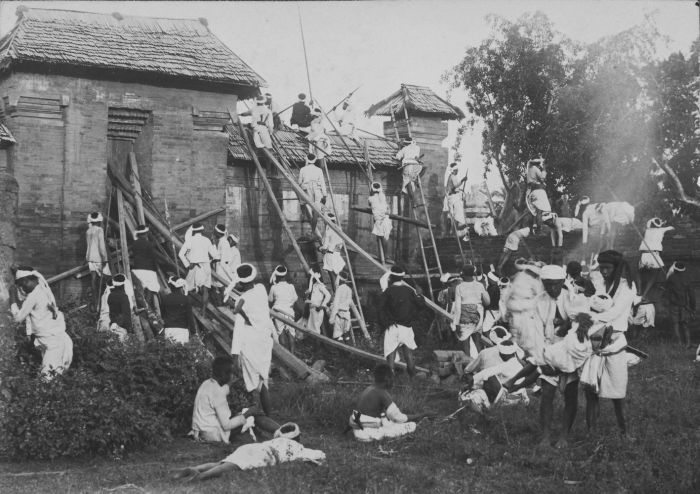
Siege of a gate play in Bali (1910-1920)

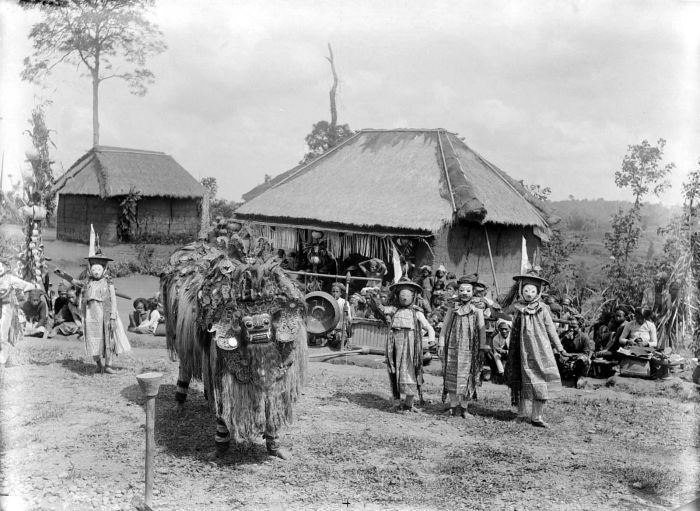
Balinese performance

== See also ==
- Balinese art
- Balinese dance
- Theatre of Indonesia
- Folklore of Indonesia
- Dance in Indonesia
