= Gajahmina =

Gajahmina (lit. 'elephant-fish') may refer to:

- Gajamina, a Balinese mythological creature
- Eta Ceti, a star named Gajahmina
