= Gambuh =

Indonesian traditional dance

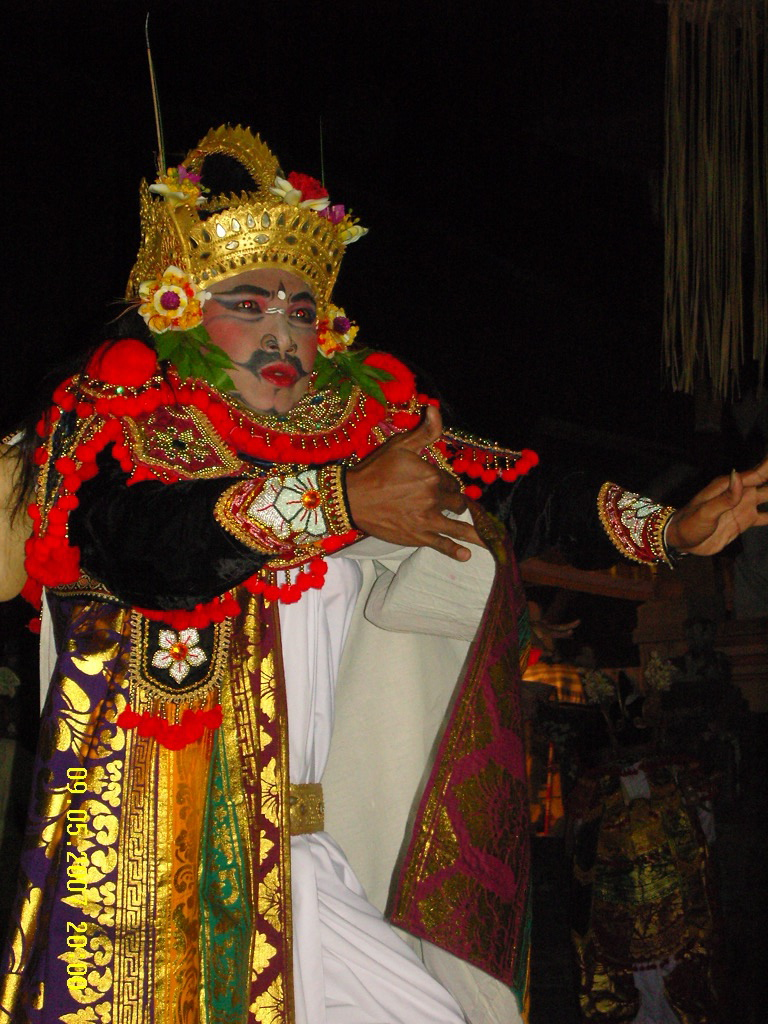
- Gambuh performance depicting an arya or nobleman
- Native name: ᬕᬫ᭄ᬩᬸᬄ (Balinese); Tari Gambuh (Indonesian)
- Instrument(s): Gamelan
- Inventor: Balinese
- Origin: Indonesia

Three genres of traditional dance in Bali
- UNESCO Intangible Cultural Heritage
- Country: Indonesia
- Reference: 00617
- Region: Asia and the Pacific

Inscription history
- Inscription: 2015 (10th session)
- List: Representative
- Wali Sacred Dances (Rejang, Sanghyang Dedari, Baris Upacara), Bebali Semi sacred Dances (Topeng Sidhakarya/Topeng Pajegan, Gambuh dance drama, Wayang Wong dance drama), Balih-balihan Entertainment Dances (Legong Kraton, Joged Bumbung, Barong Ket)

Gambuh (from Balinese ᬕᬫ᭄ᬩᬸᬄ) is an ancient form of Balinese dance-drama. It is accompanied by musicians in a gamelan gambuh ensemble.

== History ==
Gambuh is one of the oldest surviving forms in Balinese performing arts, dating to the late Majapahit era (ca. 15th century) with very little known change since this time. Emiko Susilo writes, "when the dance-dramas of Majapahit came to Bali, they had the new task of preserving the tradition of a fallen dynasty" (emphasis in original). It also introduced a new element of narrative to Balinese performing arts that influenced other forms of dance-drama on the island, such as topeng masked dance and arja opera. For centuries it was supported by patronage at the royal courts of Bali's aristocracy, during which it achieved its greatest heights of sophistication. As the courts fell apart in the bloody wars with the Dutch, this support evaporated and much of the art of gambuh was lost. Like the many other arts that formerly depended on royal patronage, gambuh found some community support by playing for temple ceremonies.

Gambuh is mainly preserved in one village, Batuan. In 1997, Susilo observed, "In total there are perhaps only four groups that perform in the Gambuh style." It is unknown even among Balinese performers. The dance and music are technically exacting and complex; the dialogue requires knowledge of the Kawi language. Musicians are required to master the metre-long end-blown flutes. Performances are long and, unlike wayang shows, contain only small sections comic relief, making demands of potential audiences.

== Dramatic components ==
Combining dance, music, and acting, gambuh draws on the narrative material of the Malat, a long poem about the fictional Javanese prince, Raden Panji. He is separated from his fiancée, Rangkesari (known as Candra Kirana in Javanese versions of the story), after she goes wandering in the forest and gets swept up by a gust of wind. This begins a long romance in which the two lovers search for each other over years and across wide areas of medieval Java. They finally meet on the field of battle, recognise each other through their disguises, and live happily ever after. Other characters include members of the court and their servants. The refined (alus) characters speak in Kawi, an old literary tongue, which is translated for the audience into contemporary Balinese by the characters of lower status.

== Gamelan gambuh ==
A complete gamelan gambuh requires approximately 17 musicians to accompany the dance-drama. The main instruments in gambuh performances are very low bamboo flutes, called suling gambuh, between 75 and 100 cm in length and 4 and 5 cm in diameter. There are usually four such flutes, but sometimes only as few as two or as many as six flutes are employed. The suling gambuh play melodies along with a rebab while percussion instruments fill out the sound with a variety of timbres and rhythms: a medium-sized gong, a small gong called kajar, two kendang, a chime called klenang, a bell tree called gentorag, rincik (reminiscent of a ceng-ceng), a metallophone called kenyir, kangsi, and gumanak. The last three of those instruments—the kenyir, kangsi, and gumanak—are not currently found in any other gamelan ensemble of Bali.

== Gallery ==
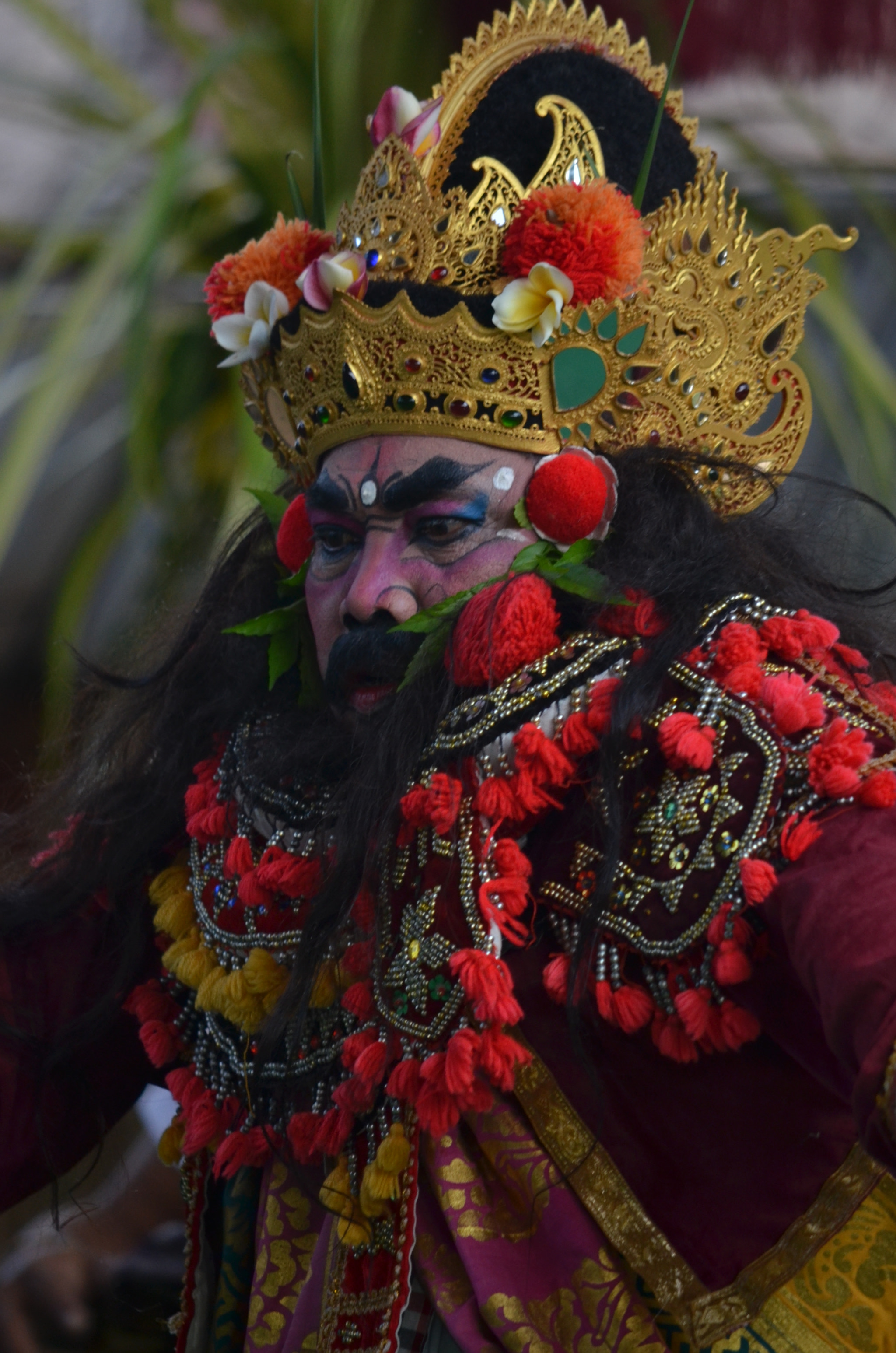

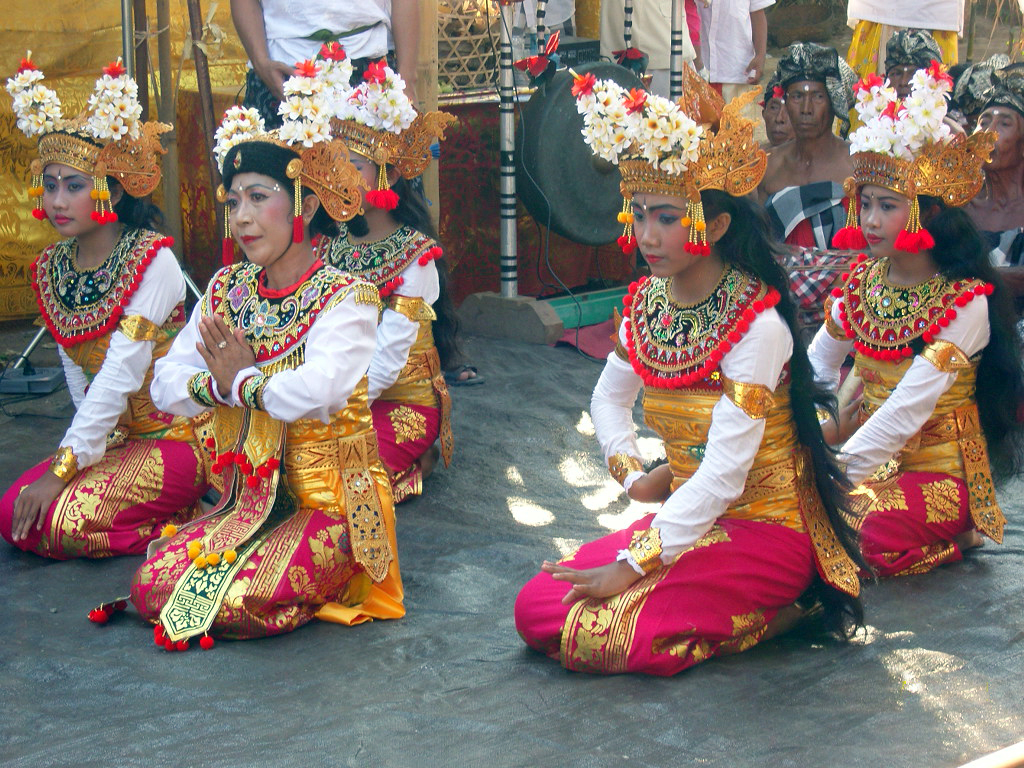

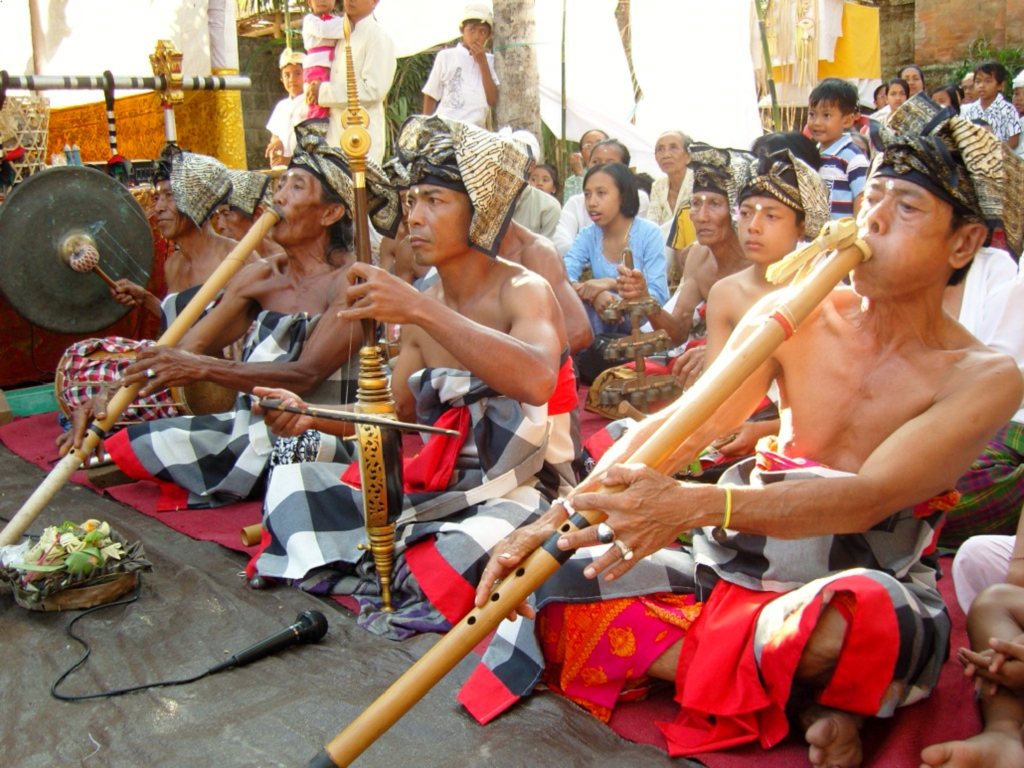

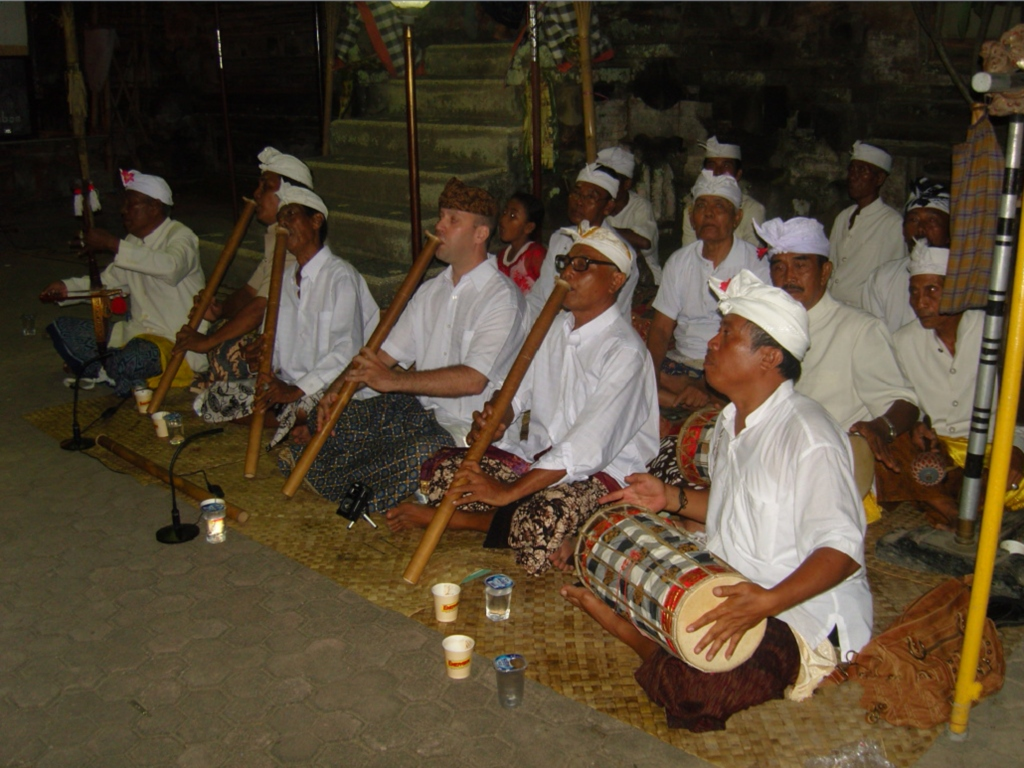

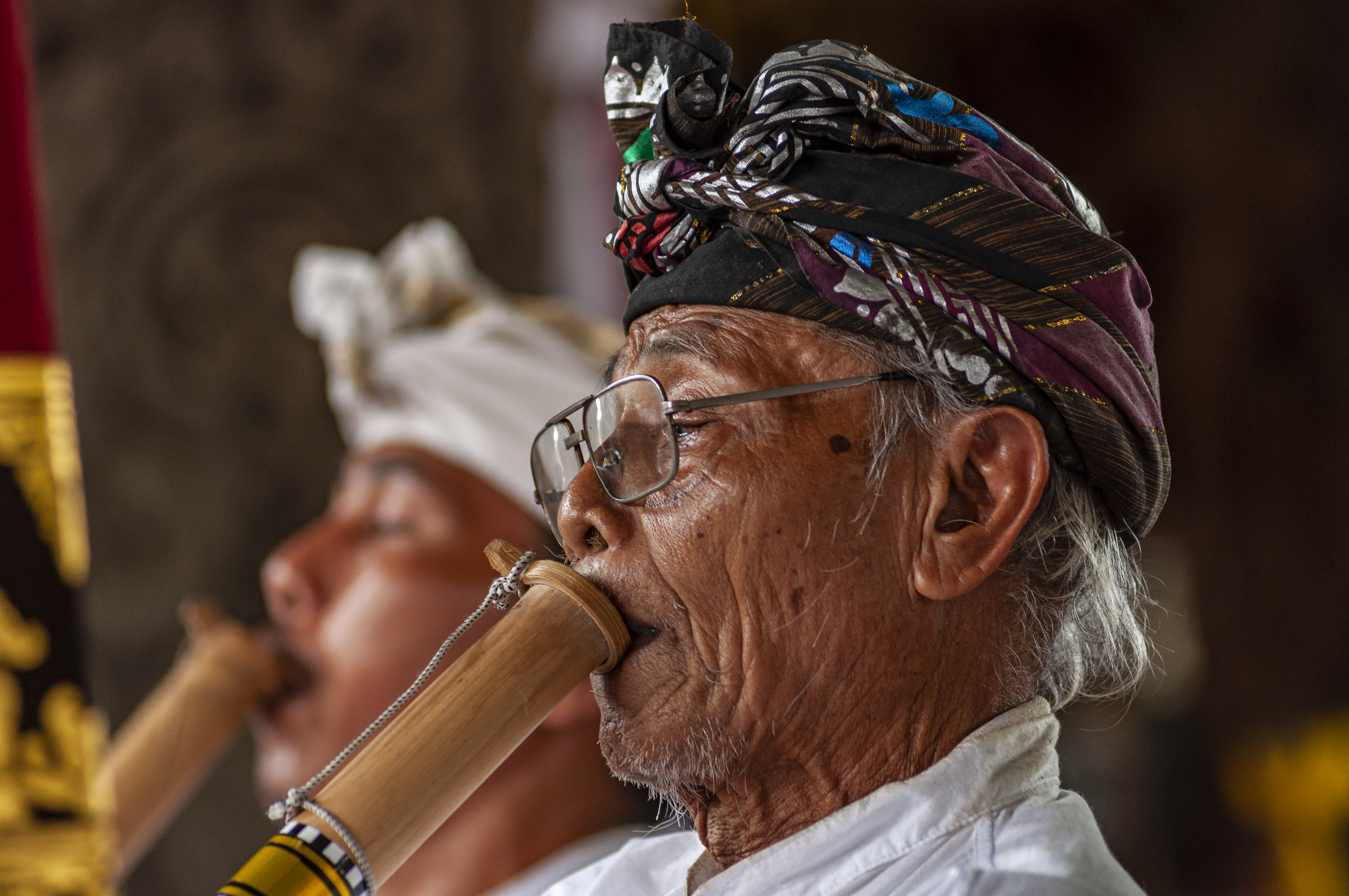

== See also ==
- Balinese dance
- Music of Bali
