= Arja (theatre) =

Indonesian traditional art performance

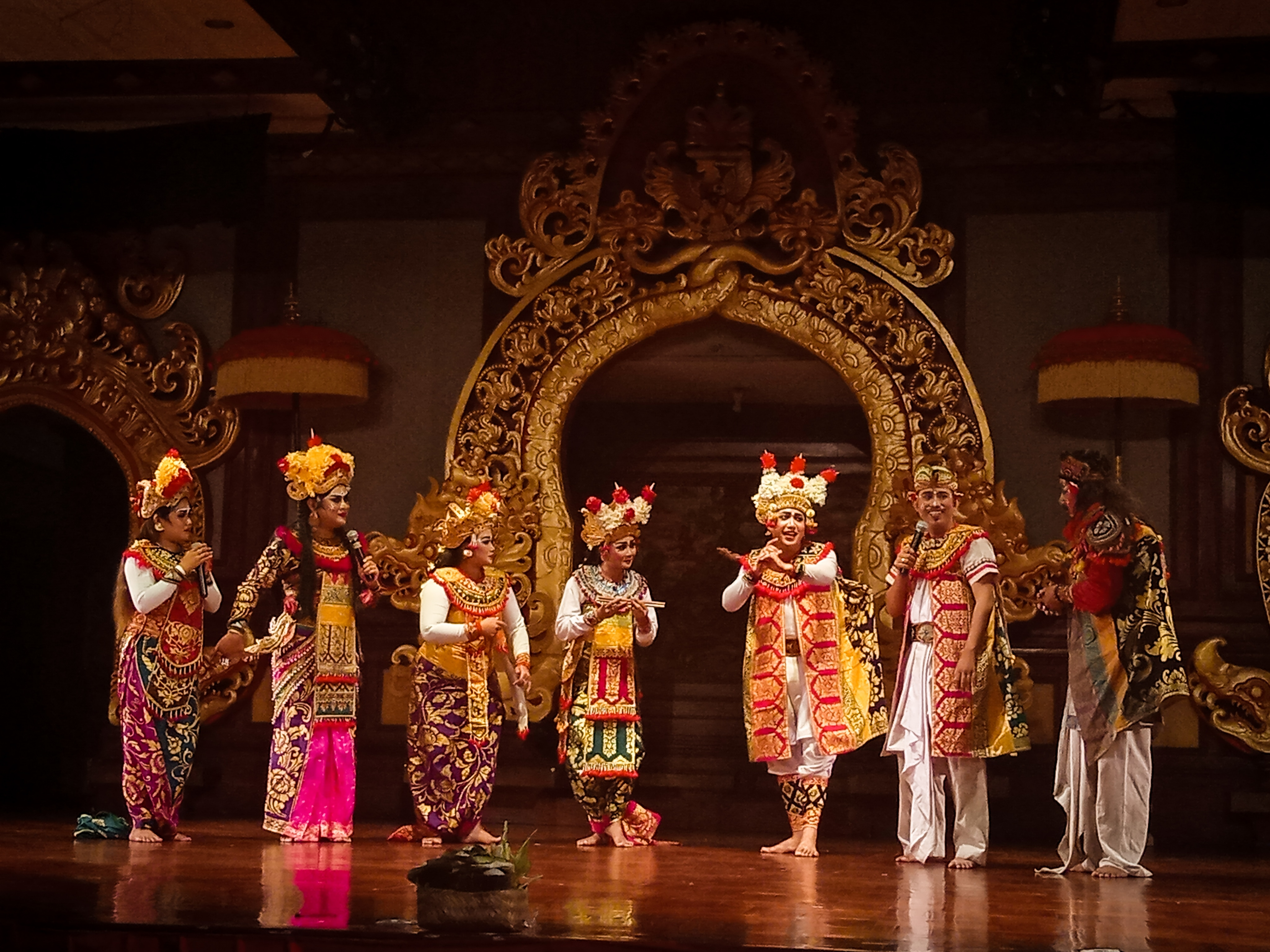
- Arja performance in 2020
- Types: Traditional theatre
- Ancestor arts: Balinese
- Originating culture: Indonesia

Arja (Balinese: ᬅᬃᬚ), also known as Balinese opera, is a popular form of Balinese theatre which combines elements of opera, dance, and drama. It was created in 1825 for the funeral of a Balinese prince. In the beginning, it had an all-male cast, but since the 20th century, all performers (including those playing men) have been women.

The Panji tales are the most important plot material. Since the 20th century, Arja performances have also enacted Balinese mythology and legends as well as Indian (Mahabharata and Ramayana), Chinese, Arabic, and more recently, western and contemporary Indonesian stories.

Singing and stylized dance movements are accompanied by gamelan music played with two bamboo zithers called guntang.

== See also ==
- Balinese theatre
- Balinese dance
- Balinese culture
- Theatre of Indonesia
