= Gajamina =

Gajahmina depicted in Klungkung Palace, Bali

Gajahmina depicted by ethnologist Alfred Maaß (1929)

Gadjamina, Gaja minah, or Eon is an elephant-headed mythical creature with the body of a fish. The term is derived from the Sanskrit words gaja गज "elephant" and mīna मीन "fish". It is used for patulangan sarcophagi in Bali, Indonesia. The form is used for members of the Shudra caste as well as the Kshatriya caste.

Gajahmina is the name of a Balinese constellation (lintang) that corresponds to the Western constellation Cetus. The IAU Working Group on Star Names adopted the name Gajahmina for the star Eta Ceti in 2026.

== See also ==
- Makara
