= Theatre of Indonesia =

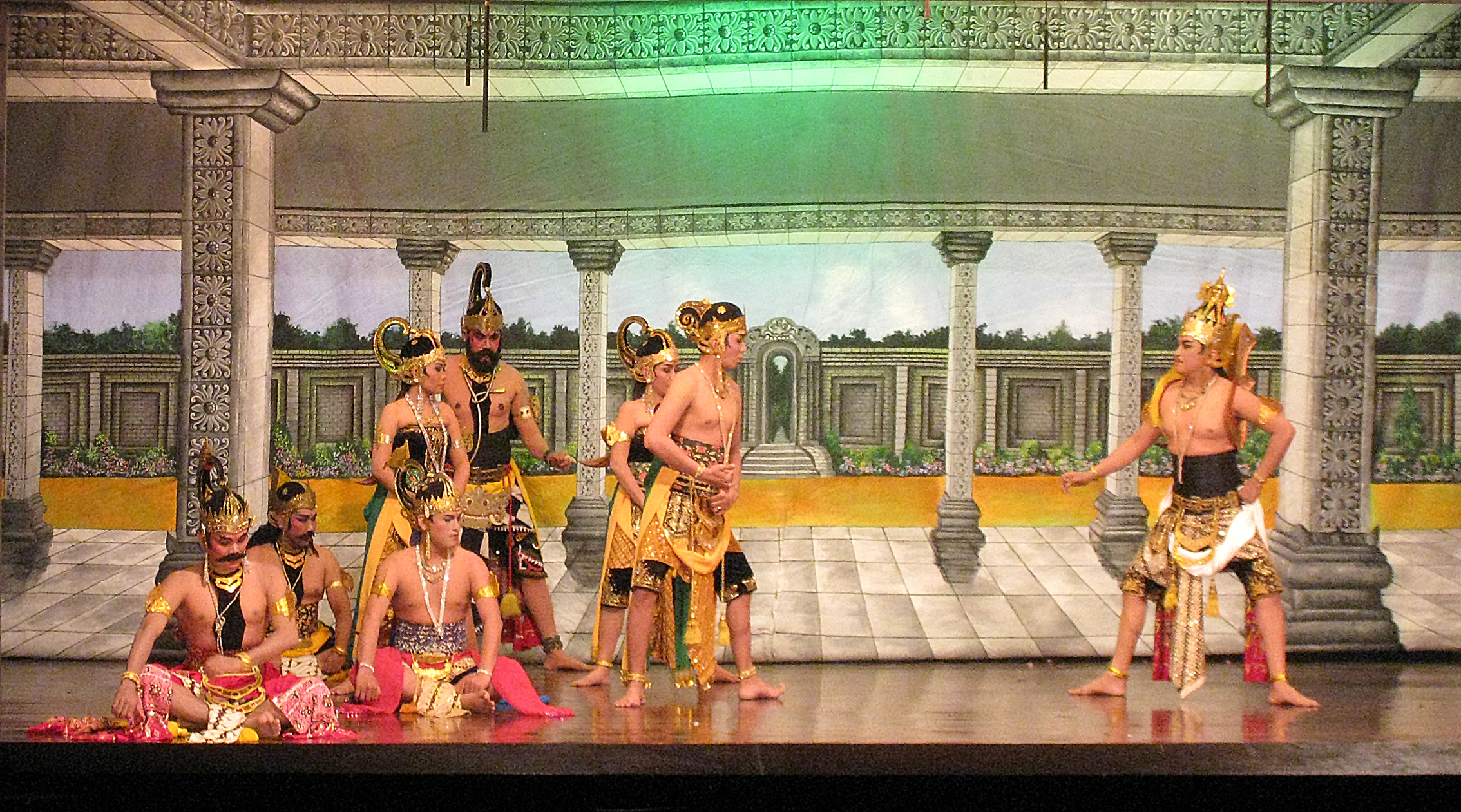
- Pandava and Krishna in an act of the Wayang Wong performance
- Types: Theatre
- Ancestor arts: Native Indonesians
- Originating culture: Indonesia

Theatre of Indonesia describes the theatrical traditions indigenous to Indonesia still found both nationally, and locally in various parts of that country, today.

== List of theatre in Indonesia ==
=== Wayang ===
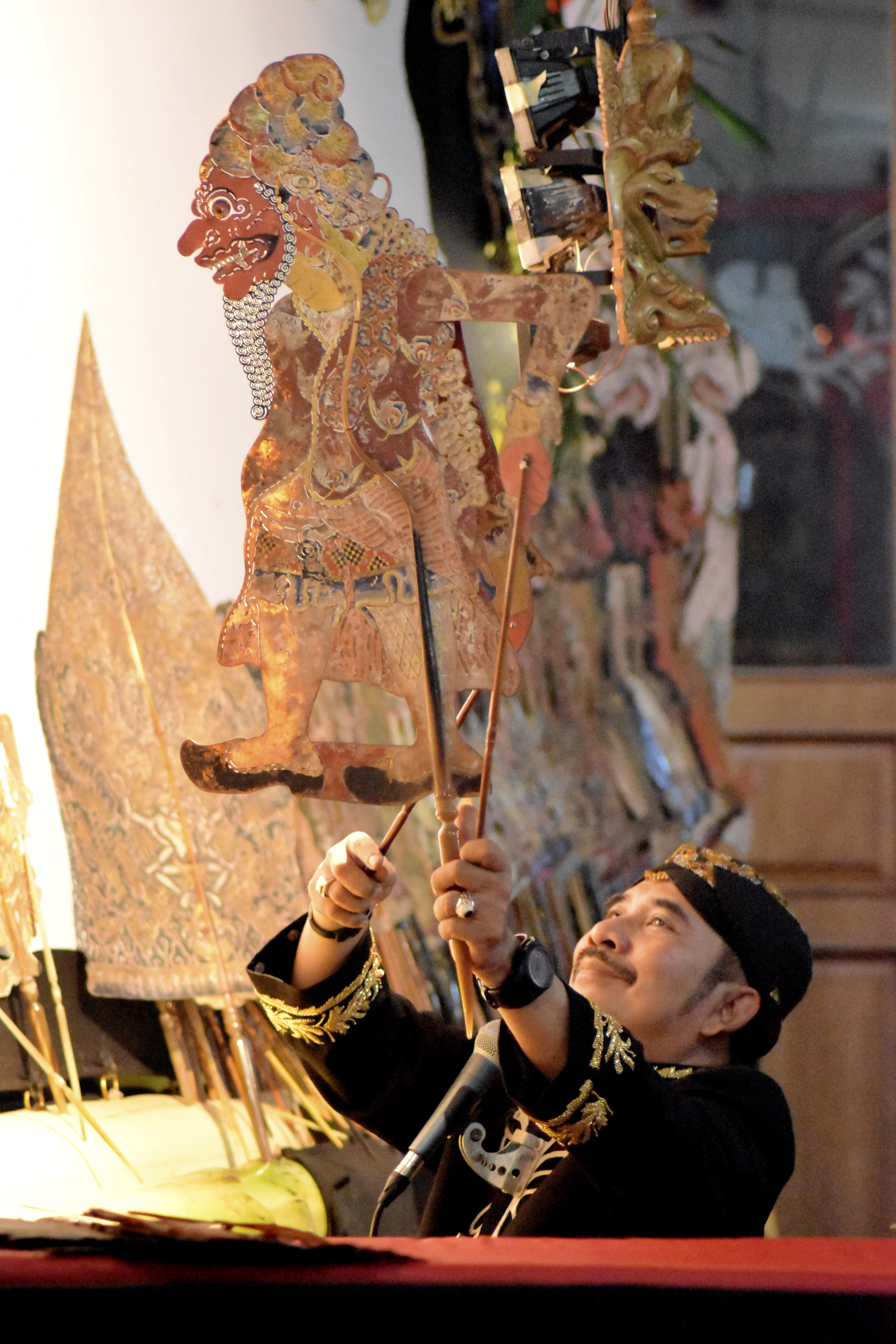
Wayang Kulit performance with Dalang

Wayang is a traditional form of puppet theatre play originated on the Indonesian island of Java. Wayang kulit is a unique form of theatre employing light and shadow. The puppets are crafted from buffalo hide and mounted on bamboo sticks. When held up behind a piece of white cloth, with an electric bulb or an oil lamp as the light source, shadows are cast on the screen. The plays are typically based on romantic tales and religious legends, especially adaptations of the classic epics, the Mahabharata and the Ramayana. Some of the plays are also based on local stories like Panji tales.

=== Wayang wong ===
Wayang wong, also known as wayang orang (literally "human wayang"), is a type of classical Javanese dance theatrical performance with themes taken from episodes of the Ramayana or Mahabharata. The bas relief panels on the 9th-century of Prambanan temple show episodes of the Ramayana epic. The adaptation of Mahabharata episodes has been integrated in the Javanese literature tradition since the Kahuripan and Kediri era, with notable examples such as Arjunawiwaha, composed by Mpu Kanwa in the 11th century. The Penataran temple in East Java depicts themes from the Ramayana and Mahabharata in its bas reliefs. The Javanese dance drama associated with wayang's epic themes from the Ramayana and Mahabharata would have existed by then. Wayang wang was a performance in the style of wayang kulit (the shadow theatre of Central Java) wherein actors and actresses took the puppets' roles. The first written reference to the form is on the stone inscription Wimalarama from East Java dated 930 CE. The genre is currently done in masked and unmasked variations in Central Java, Bali, and Cirebon, as well as in Sundanese (West Java). Wayang wong is closely associated with Indonesian culture.

=== Topeng ===
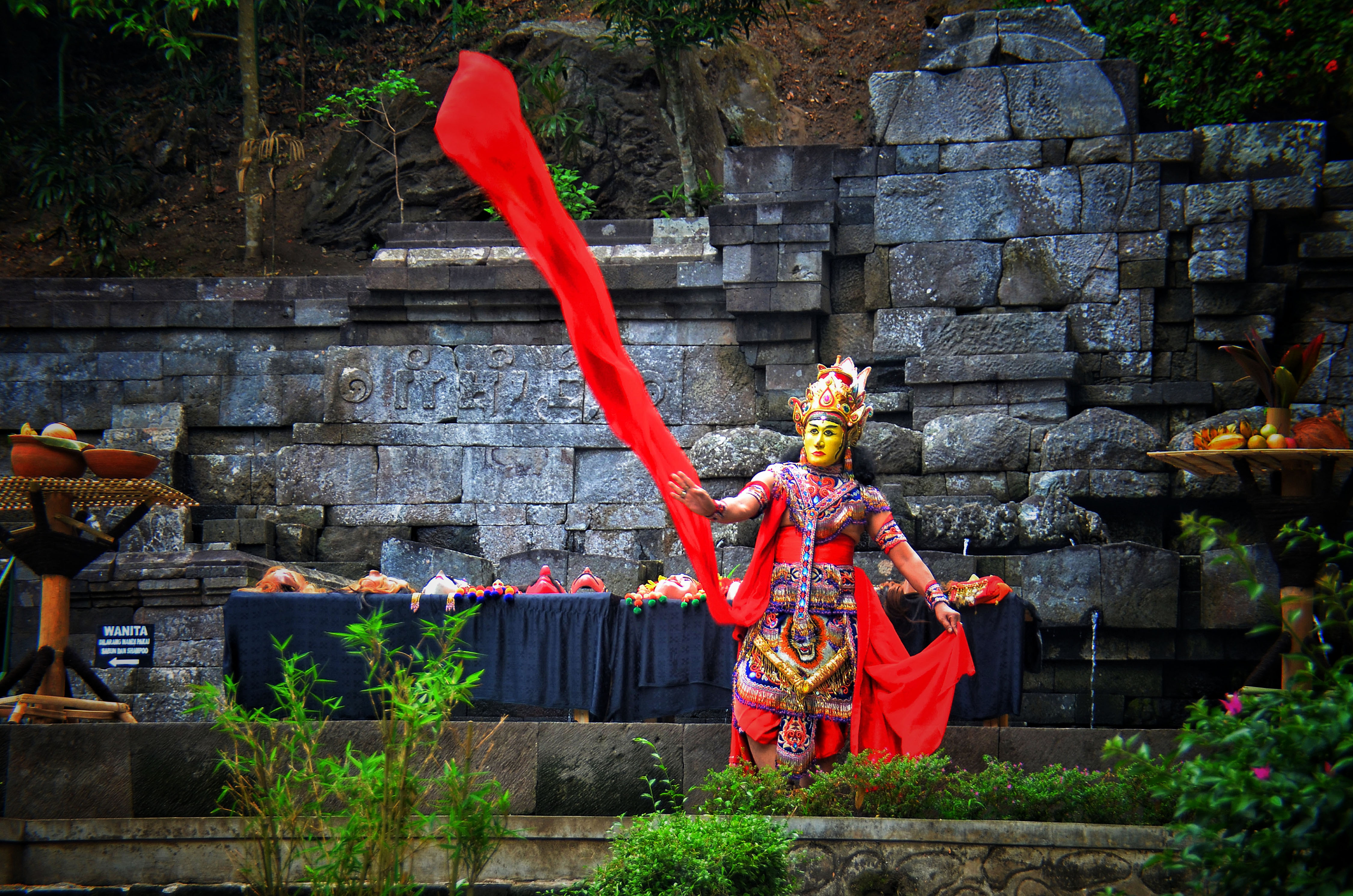
Topeng performance in Java

Topeng (Indonesian for "mask") is a dramatic form of Indonesian dance theatre in which one or more mask-wearing. Indonesian masked dance predates Hindu-Buddhist influences. Native Indonesian tribes still perform traditional masked-dances to represent nature, as the Hudoq dance of the Dayak people of Kalimantan, or to represent ancestor spirits. With the arrival of Hinduism in the archipelago, the Ramayana and Mahabharata epics began to be performed in masked-dance. The most popular storyline of topeng dance, however, derived from the locally developed Javanese Panji cycles, based on the tales and romance of Prince Panji and Princess Chandra Kirana, set in the 12th-century Kadiri kingdom.

=== Ketoprak ===
Ketoprak is a theatrical genre of Java featuring actors who may also sing to the accompaniment of the gamelan. The show were performed in certain period in an empty plain near a village and moved from one place to another, in fashion similar to western travelling circus. In this traveling troupe, the performers and staffs also brought show properties; such as costumes, stage decorations, chairs, gamelan, sound system, diesel electric generator, all were contained in a portable building that also used as set or stage called "tobong". During their journey, the troupe members also living in this tobong. Recently ketoprak has been adopted into television show, the "Ketoprak Humor" show was aired in Indonesian national television. It is a comedy and action performance, often took place in modern settings or in historical ancient Javanese kingdoms. The ketoprak that took the story of ancient Java is quite similar to Wayang wong performance, however ketoprak performance is more free for improvisations.

=== Randai ===
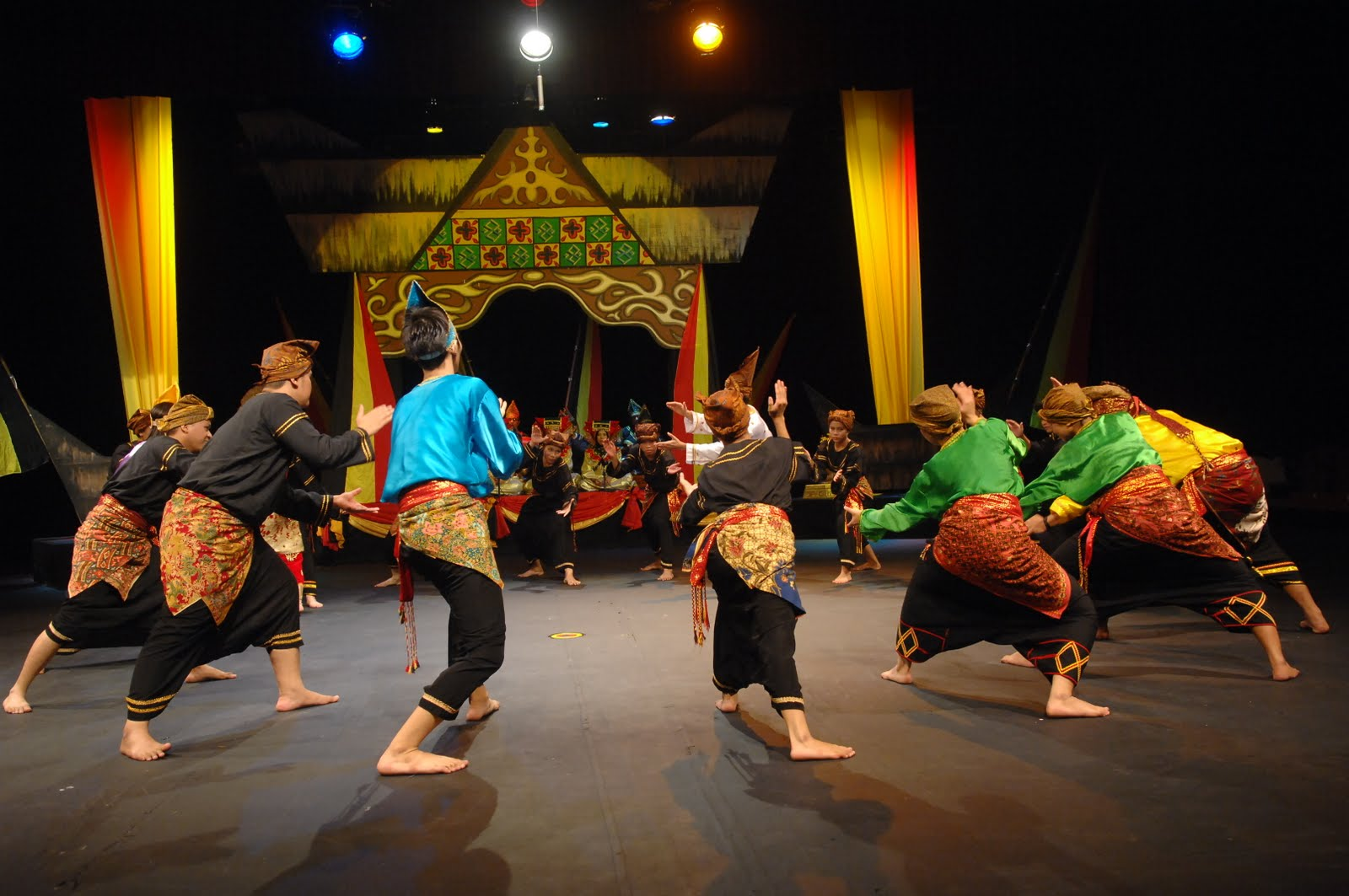
Randai performance in Jakarta

Randai is a folk theater tradition of the Minangkabau ethnic group in West Sumatra, Indonesia, which incorporates music, singing, dance, drama and the martial art of Silat. Randai performances are a synthesis of alternating martial arts dances, songs, and acted scenes. Stories are delivered by both the acting and the singing and are mostly based upon Minangkabau legends and folktales.

=== Lenong ===
Lenong is a traditional theatrical form of the Betawi people in Jakarta, Indonesia. Lenong developed from the earlier form Gambang Rancag. Lenong is a form of theatre traditional to the Betawi people. Dialogue is generally in the Betawi dialect. Actions and dialogue are often presented in a humorous manner on top of a stage known as a pentas tapal kuda, so named for the way actors enter the stage from the left and right. Audiences sit in front of the stage. The number of performers is determined by the needs of the story. Male performers are referred to as panjak, while female performers are known as ronggeng.

=== Arja ===
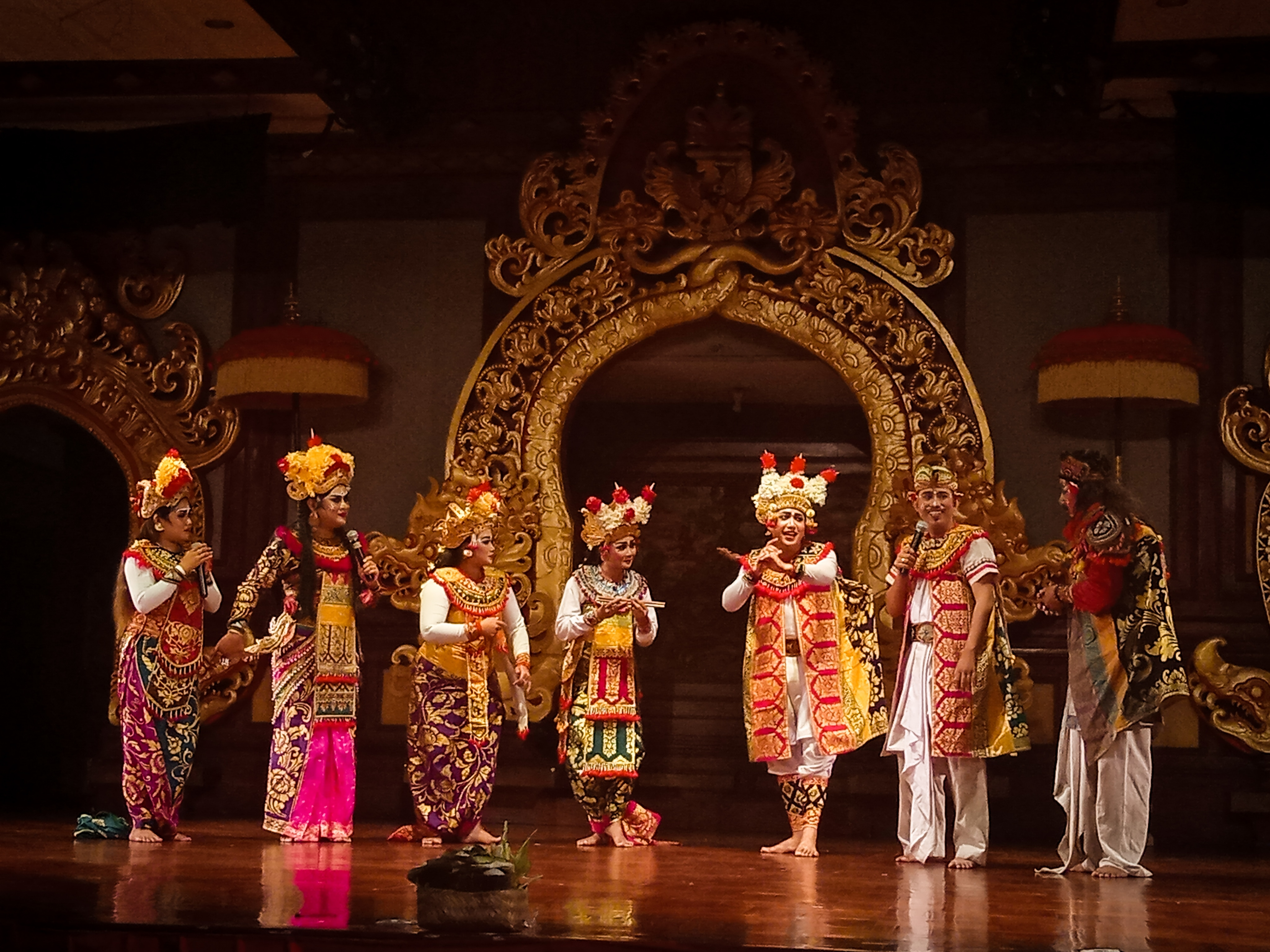
Arja performance in 2020

Arja is a popular form of Balinese theatre which combines elements of opera, dance, and drama.

=== Barong ===
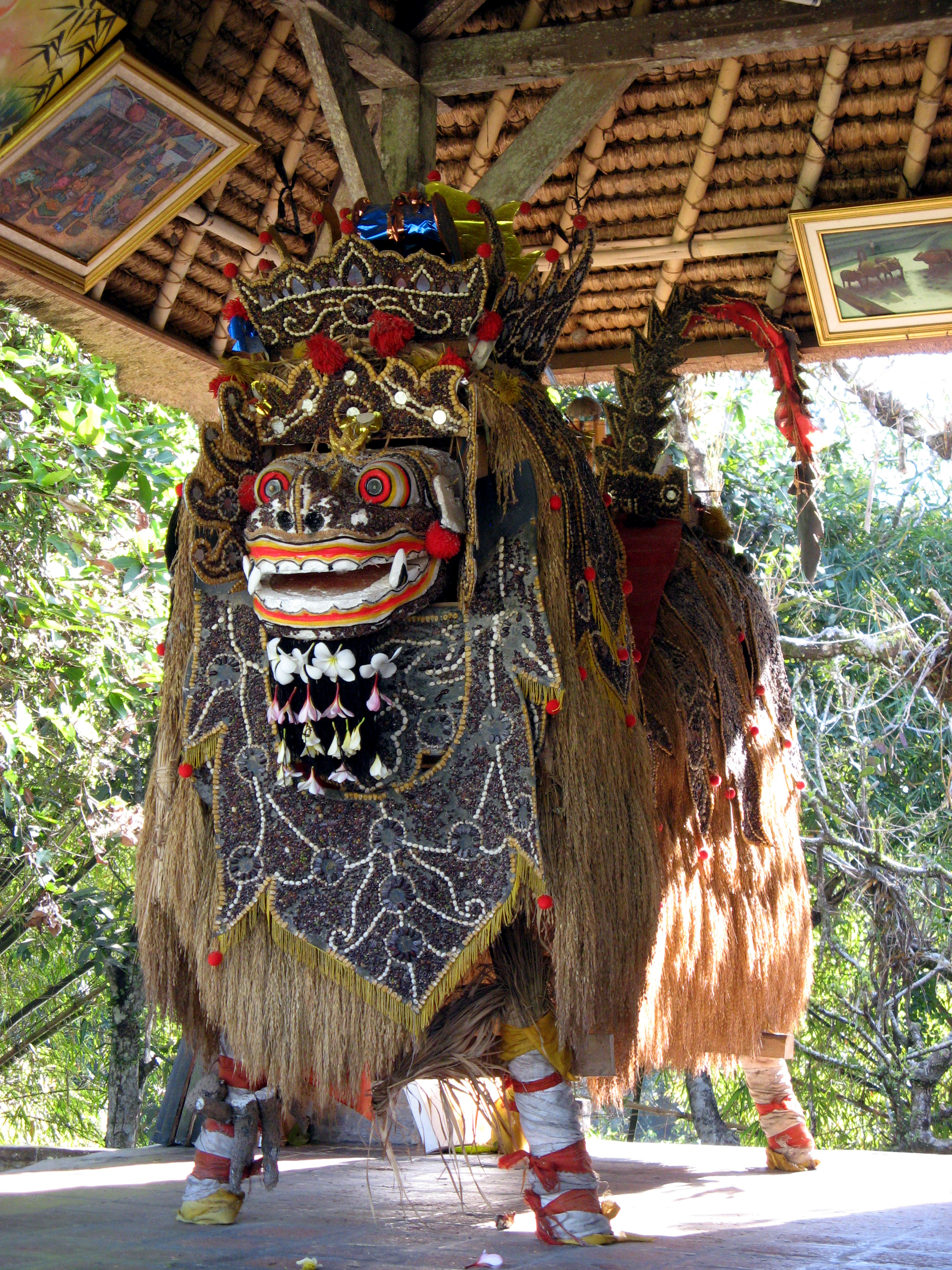
Barong, a Balinese mythological creature.

Barong is a style of traditional Balinese and Javanese dance theatre from Bali and Java. Barong is the king of the spirits, leader of the hosts of good, and enemy of Rangda, the demon queen and mother of all spirit guarders in the mythological traditions of Bali. The Barong dance featured battle between Barong and Rangda to represent the eternal battle between good and evil.

=== Reog ===
Reog is a traditional Indonesian dance theatre in an open arena that serves as folk entertainment, contains magical elements, the main dancer is a lion-headed person with a peacock feather decoration, plus several masked dancers and Kuda Lumping. The dance describe Klono Sewandono the king of Ponorogo on his journey to Kediri to seek the hands of Princess Songgo Langit. On his journey he was attacked by a vicious monster called Singo Barong, a mythical lion with peacock on its head. Historians trace the origin of Reog Ponorogo as the satire on the incompetence of Majapahit rulers during the end of the empire. It describe the innate Ponorogo liberty and its opposition on centralist Majapahit rule. The lion represent the king of Majapahit while the peafowl represent the queen, it was suggested that the king was incompetent and always being controlled by his queen. The beautiful, youthful and almost effeminate horsemen describe the Majapahit cavalry that have lost their manliness.

== See also ==
- Culture of Indonesia
