= Patulangan =

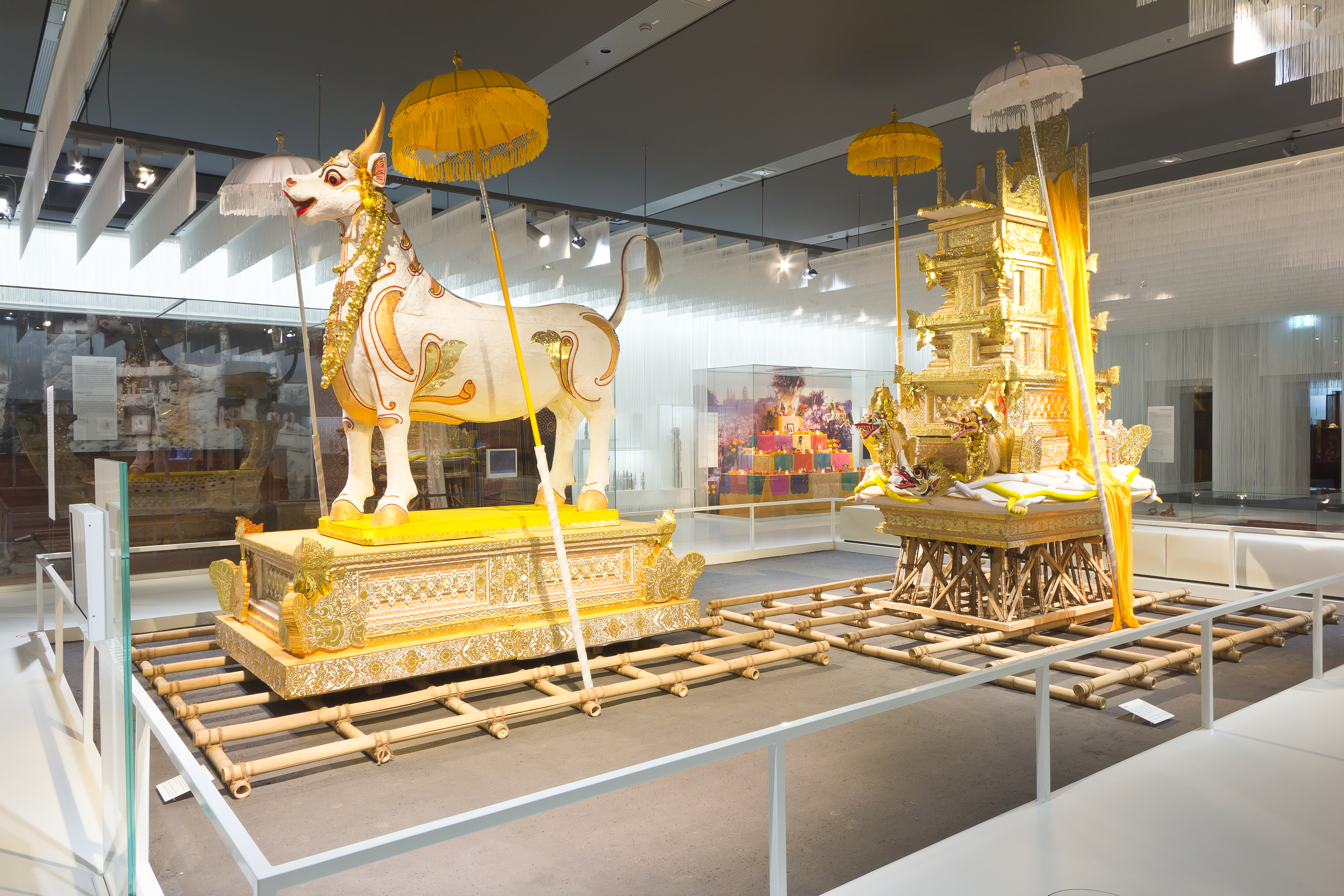
Patulangan and tower in a museum

Patulangan, sometimes called palinggihan, is a type of wooden sarcophagus used in the ngaben (cremation) in Balinese Hinduism on the island of Bali, Indonesia. They are shaped in animal forms, real and mythical. The body is brought to the patulangan in a bodé, a pagoda like structure with an odd number multi-tiered roof (the more roof tiers the higher the prestige).

The patulangan and bodé are cremated along with the body. Traditionally the design of the sarcophagus depends on the varna of the deceased. Bull shaped patulangan are used for male Brahmins, cows for female Brahmins, lions for Kshatriya, winged lions for prabali, deer for Vaishyas, and the gajah mina (elephant-fish) and cecekakan for jaba (caste).

Because of the high cost of the funeral and its rituals, bodies are often buried and disinterred for mass funeral events. The tower is shaken and circled during the funeral procession so that the soul cannot find its way back home. War battles are simulated and water is tossed. The structures and body are cremated and the ashes scattered in the ocean. The process is meant to liberate the soul to ascend to heaven and the family temple.

== Gallery ==
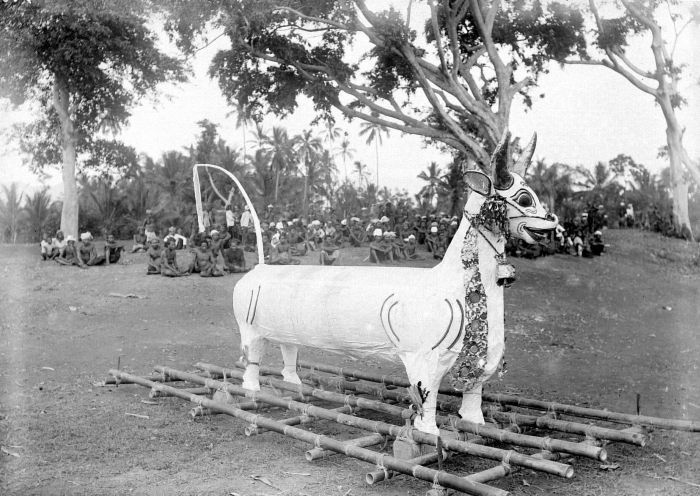
Patulangan in the form of a bull / ox

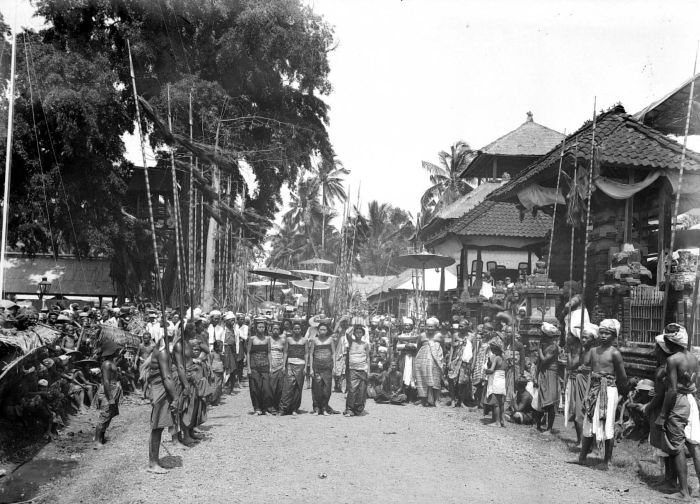
Funeral procession

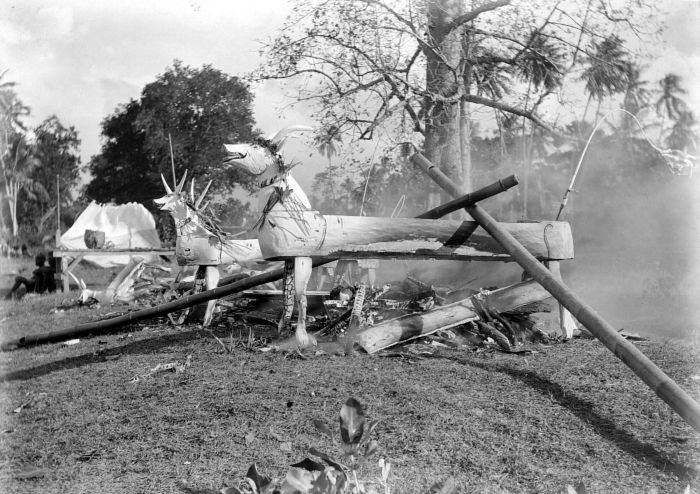

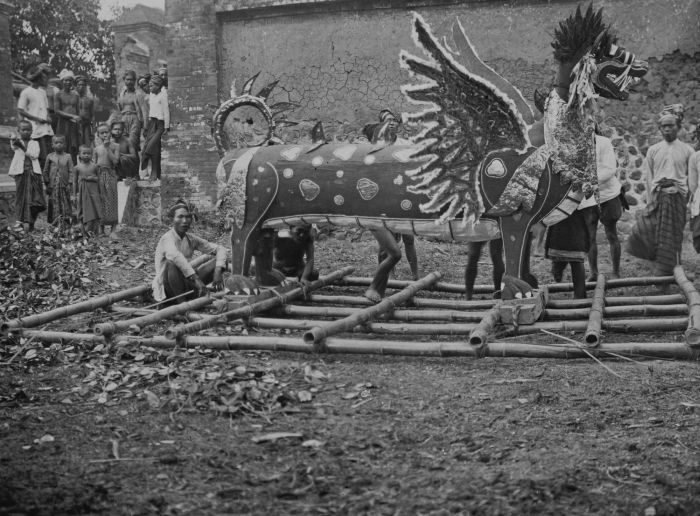
