= Balinese temple =

Style of Balinese Hindu temple

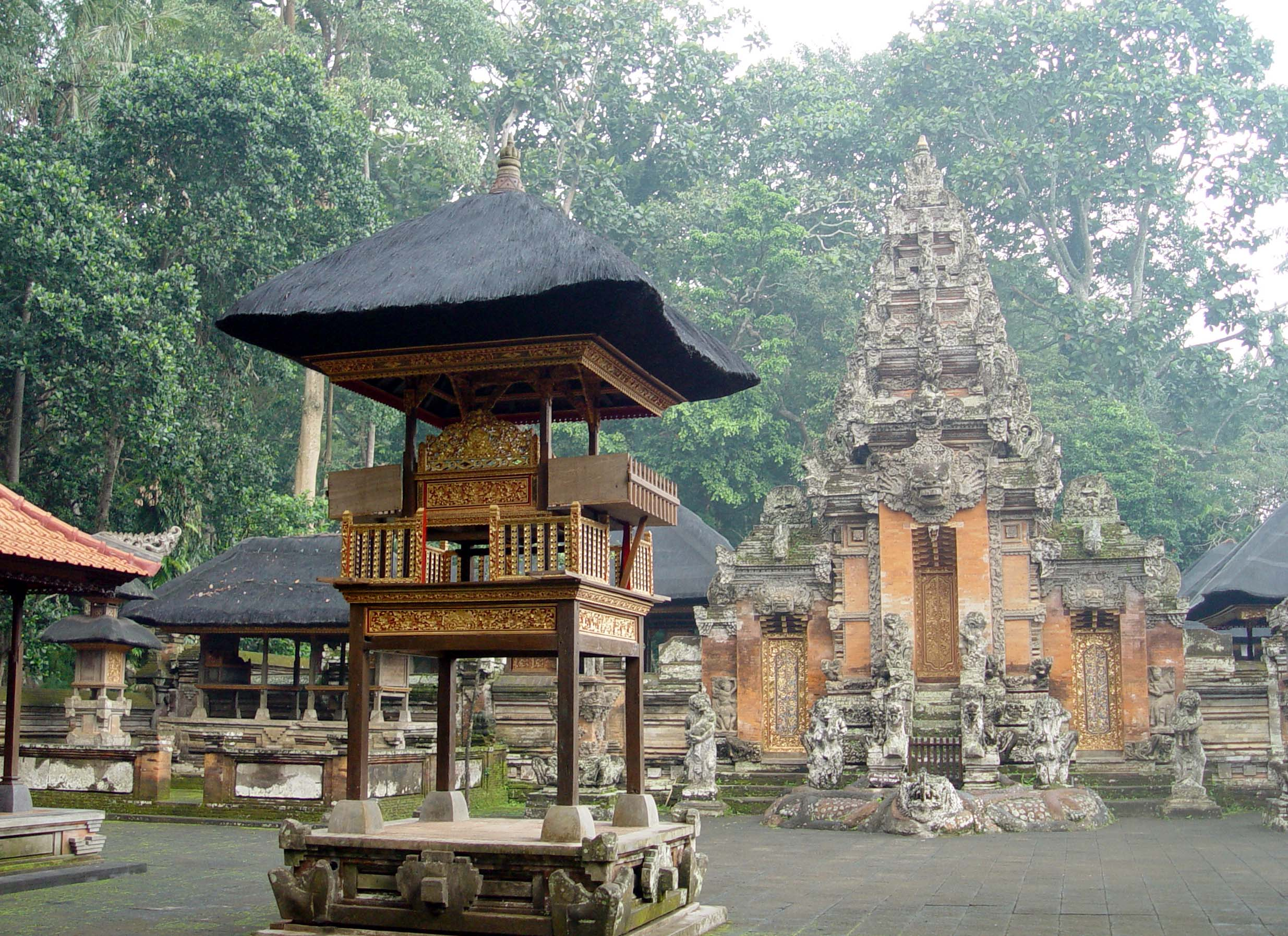
Richly adorned kori agung gate and pavilions within Pura Dalem Agung Padantegal compounds in Bali.

A Balinese temple, known as a pura (from Balinese ᬧᬸᬭ 'pura', Balinese pronunciation: [puɾə]), is a place of worship for adherents of Balinese Hinduism in Indonesia. Puras are designed according to principles of Balinese sacred architecture, incorporating prescribed spatial orientation, ritual functions, and ceremonial regulations. They serve as focal points for communal worship rather than congregational prayer, with participation organised through families, villages, and ritual associations.

Most puras are located on the island of Bali, where Balinese Hinduism is the predominant religion, though many also exist elsewhere in Indonesia in regions with significant Balinese communities. Among them, Besakih Temple, known as the Mother Temple, is regarded as the largest, most important, and holiest temple complex in Bali. The exceptionally high number of temples across the island—ranging from family shrines to major regional sanctuaries—has led Bali to be widely referred to as “the Island of a Thousand Temples.”

== Etymology ==
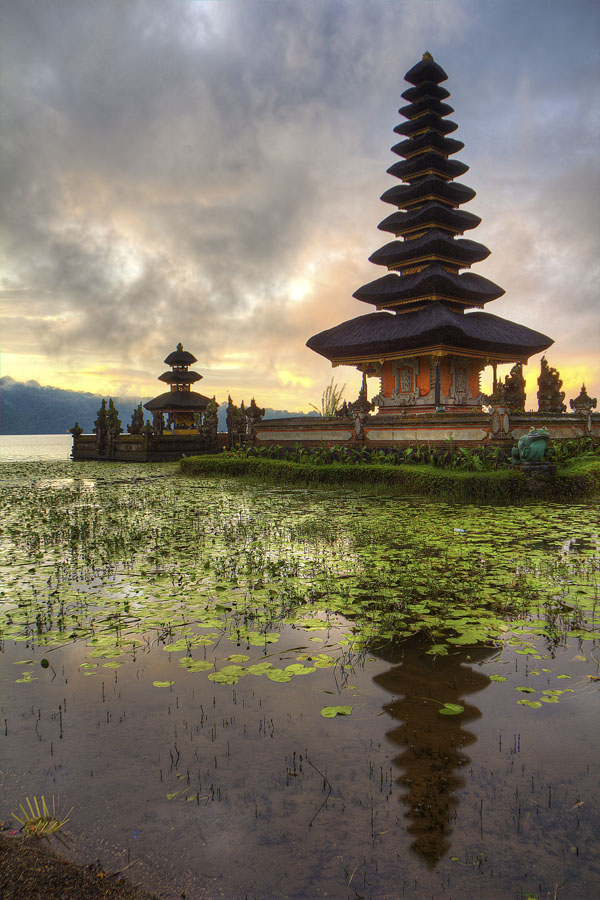
The pagoda-like Pelinggih Meru shrine of Pura Ulun Danu Bratan is a distinctive feature of a Balinese temple.

The term pura originates from the Sanskrit word (-pur, -puri, -pura, -puram, -pore), meaning "city," "walled city," "towered city," or "palace," which was adopted with the Indianization of Southeast Asia and the spread of Hinduism, especially in the Indosphere. During the development of the Balinese language, the term pura came to refer to a religious temple complex, while the term puri came to refer to a palace, the residence of kings and nobles, similar to Javanese kratons.

== Design and layout ==
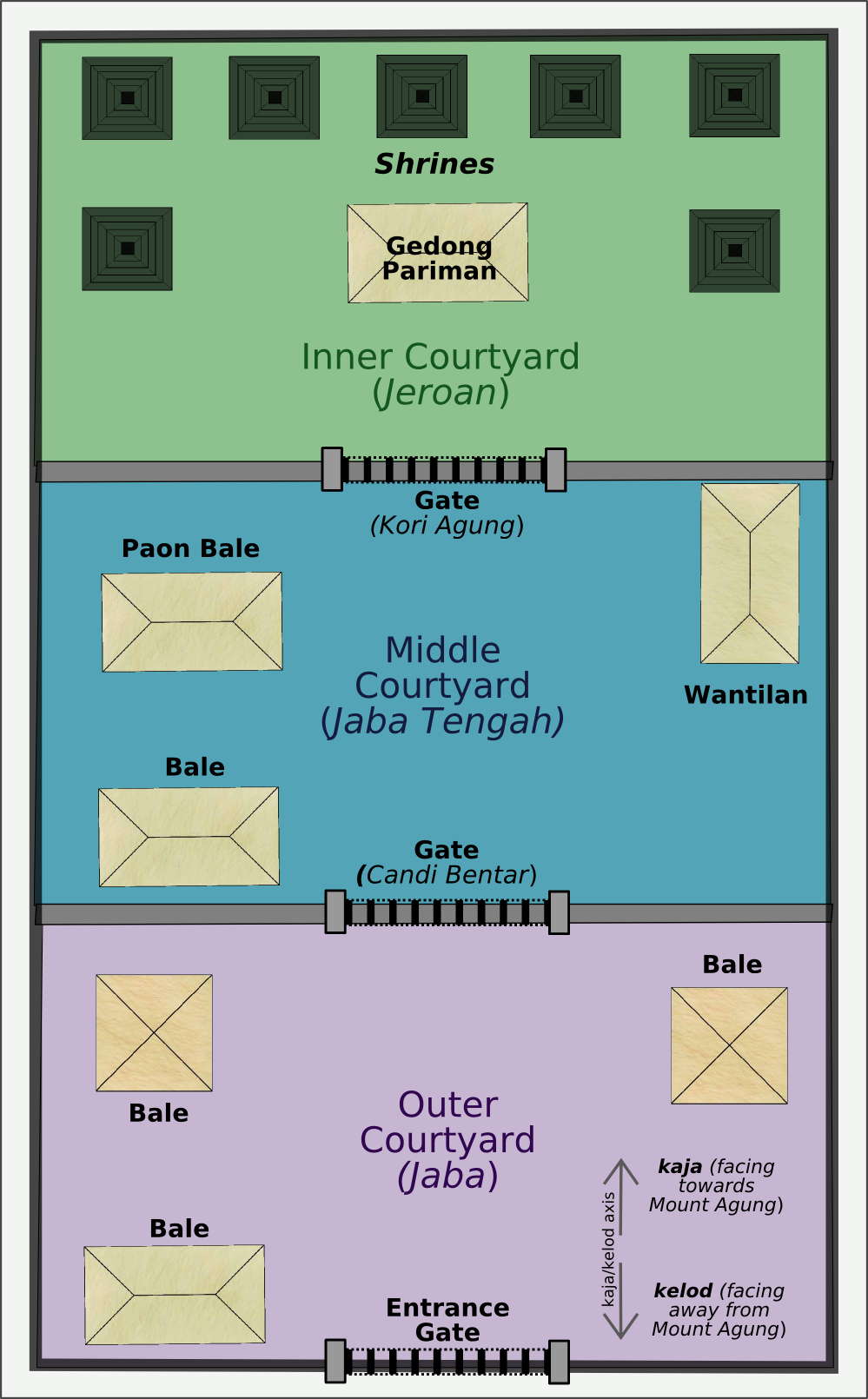
Balinese temple layout, arranged in three zones (mandalas)

Unlike the common towering indoor Hindu temples of the Indian subcontinent, puras are designed as open-air places of worship within enclosed walls, connected with a series of intricately decorated gates between their compounds. These walled compounds contain several shrines, meru (towers), and bale (pavilions). The design, plan, and layout of the pura follow the trimandala concept of Balinese space allocation.

Three mandala zones are arranged according to a sacred hierarchy:

1. Utama mandala (jero): the holiest and the most sacred zone within the pura. This enclosed compound is the closest facing kaja (towards the mountain) and usually contains a padmasana shrine, the towering lotus throne dedicated to the supreme god, Sang Hyang Widhi Wasa; the pelinggih meru (a multi-tiered tower-shrine); and several pavilions such as bale pawedan (vedic chanting pavilion), bale piyasan, bale pepelik (offering pavilion), bale panggungan, bale murda, and gedong penyimpenan (storehouse of the temple's relics).
2. Madya mandala (jaba tengah): the middle zone of the temple, where the activity of adherents takes place, and also the location for supporting facilities of the temple. In this zone usually, several pavilions are built, such as the bale kulkul (wooden Slit drum tower), bale gong (gamelan pavilion), wantilan (meeting pavilion), bale pesandekan, and bale perantenan, the temple's kitchen.
3. Nista mandala (jaba pisan): the outer zone, which directly connects the pura compound with the outer realm and the entrance to the temple. It is positioned kelod (towards the sea). This zone usually takes the form of an open field or a garden that can be used for secula activities, religious dance performances, or as an additional space for preparations during religious festivals.

However, the layout rules for arrangements of the facilities of the two outer zones, nista mandala and madya mandala, are somewhat flexible. Several structures, such as the bale kulkul, could be built as outer corner tower; also, the perantenan (temple kitchen) could be located in the Nista mandala.

=== Gates ===
There are two types of gates within Balinese architecture: the split gate, known as candi bentar, and the roofed tower gate known as paduraksa or kori agung. Both types of gates have specific roles in Balinese architectural design. Candi bentar is the gate used in the nista mandala, while the kori agung is employed as the gate between the madya mandala and Utama mandala inner compounds.

The rules for gate types are also valid for nonreligious compounds such as puri, nobles' and kings' residences.

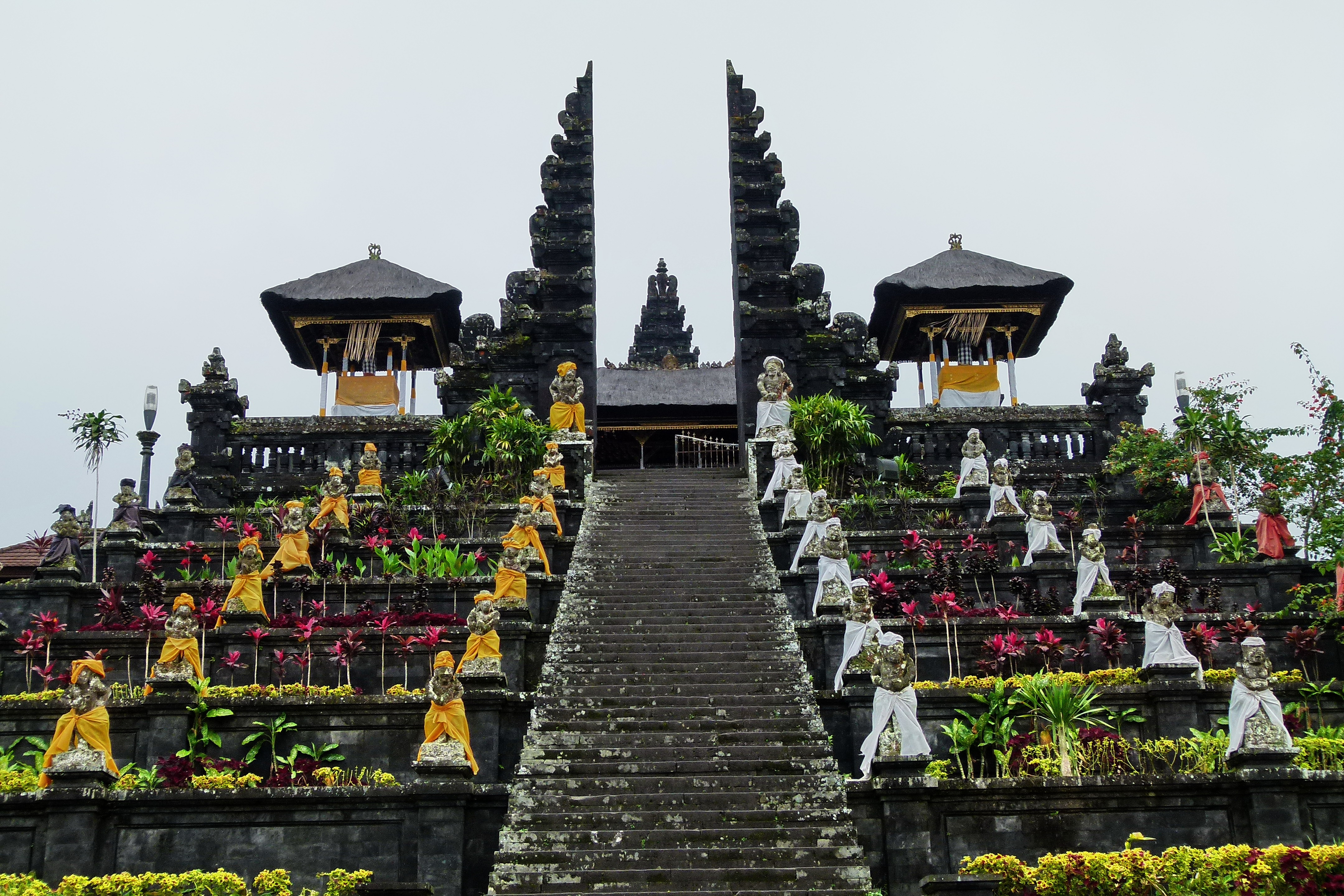
Pura Besakih: stairs and terraces leading to the candi bentar split gate.

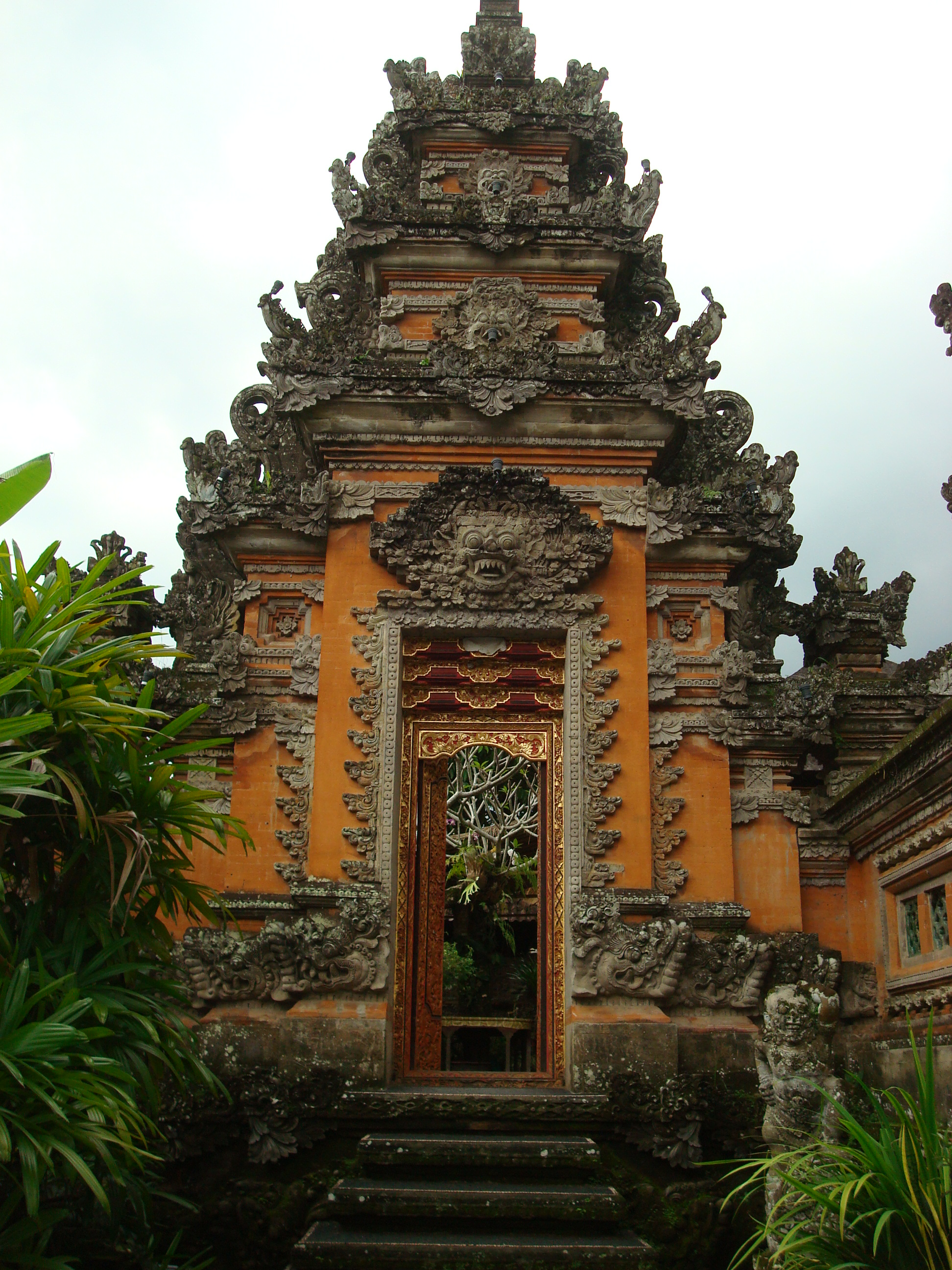
Pura Taman Saraswati (Ubud): towering kori agung gate.

== Types of pura ==
There are several types of pura, each serving certain functions of Balinese rituals throughout the Balinese calendar. The Balinese temples are arranged according to the physical and spiritual realm of Balinese people, which corresponds to kaja-kelod sacred axis, from mountain tops to the realms of gods, hyang spirits, the middle fertile plain the realm of humans, and other beings, all the way to the beach and ocean, and the many realms in Indonesia.

Kahyangan Tiga - The customary village temples, the Pura Puseh (dedicated to Vishnu), the Pura Desa or Pura Bale Agung (decicated to Brahma) and the Pura Dalem (dedicated to Shiva or Durga).

Pura Kahyangan Jagat - or “palaces of the gods,” are the nine temples on Bali that are built at the cardinal points, including one at the centre (see “Nine directional temples” further down).

Pura Tirta - "Water temples," a type of pura that associates religious function and water management function as part of the subak irrigation system. Each of these temples corresponds to a drainage basin. The priests in these temples have the authority to manage the water allocation among rice paddies in the villages surrounding the temple. Some tirta temples are noted for their sacred water and for having petirtaan or sacred bathing pools for cleansing rituals. Pura Ulun Danu Bratan, built on the edge of an important lake, is considered as the primary source of water for all agricultural activities in Bali and the feminine equivalent to Pura Besakih; it is as important as the latter. Pura Tirta Empul is another important water temple.

Pura Mrajapati - A type of pura to worship prajapati (the lord of people) or the cosmic might. Most often, in this temple, Shiva is worshipped in his form as prajapati.

Pura Segara - "Sea temples," are pura that are located by the sea to appease the sea gods and deities. It is usually important during the Melasti ritual. Examples of this type of temple are the Tanah Lot Temple and Uluwatu Temple.

== Three great temples ==
King Udayana, who ruled Bali in the late 10th–early 11th century, together with his chief priest Mpu Kuturan, a Vaiṣṇava priest from East Java, introduced major reforms to Balinese social and religious life. Drawing on the Trimurti concept, they required every village to establish three core temples known collectively as Kahyangan Tiga (“the Three Great Temples”). Together, these three temples embody the Trimurti and remain a defining feature of all Balinese pakraman (customary) villages today.

- Pura Pusêh is oriented toward kaja (the mountainward direction), reflecting Viṣṇu’s role as preserver of life and the belief that life-sustaining waters originate in the mountains.
- Pura Desa (or Pura Balé Agung) is located at the centre of the village as the focus of communal life.
- Pura Dalêm, dedicated to Śiva or his consort Durgā, is positioned kelod (toward the sea). It is sometimes inaccurately described as a “death temple” because it is often located beside the cemetery (setra) and is the site of cremation rites (ngaben).

== Nine directional temples ==
The nine directional temples (Pura Kahyangan Jagat or Pura Kahyangan Padma Bhuwana) of Bali mark the eight cardinal directions, to which is added the center point. These temples correspond to the concept of Dewata Nawa Sanga (the nine sustaining deities). They are the nine holiest places of worship on the island. Built at strategic locations, they are meant to protect the island and its people from evil spirits. These temples belong to every Balinese on the island (as opposite to the other temples, which are the property of the village or town in which they sit). They are:

- Pura Besakih (in Karangasem Regency), the "mother temple" of Bali, for the north-east direction, associated with the god Sambhu.
- Pura Lempuyang Luhur (half in Karangasem district and half in Abang district, Karangasem Regency), for the east direction, associated with the god Iswara.
- Pura Goa Lawah (in Pesinggahan district, Klungkung Regency), for the south-east direction; this temple is also one of the six "sanctuaries of the world" and is associated with the god Maheswara.
- Pura Luhur Andakasa (in Antiga, Manggis, Klungkung Regency), for the south direction and is associated with god Brahma.
- Pura Luhur Uluwatu (in Pecatu, Badung), for the south-west direction and is associated with the god Rudra.
- Pura Luhur Batukaru (in Tabanan), for the west direction and is associated with the god Mahadeva.
- Pura Pucak Mangu (in the village of Pelaga, Petang district, Badung Regency, on Mount Catur), for the north-west direction and is associated with the god Sangkara.
- Pura Ulun Danu Batur (in Kintamani), for the north direction. The name Ulun Danu means “head of the lake”; it is the abode of the goddess Batari Ulun Danu, ruler of the lakes and associated with the god Vishnu.
- Pura Pusering Jagat (Pura Puser Tasik) (Pejeng, near Ubud, in Gianyar), for the center direction, associated with the god Shiva.

== Six sanctuaries of the world ==
The "six sanctuaries of the world" (Sad Kahyangan Jagad, with Sad meaning "six") are the six holiest places of worship in Bali. According to Balinese beliefs, they are the pivotal points of the island and are meant to provide spiritual balance to Bali. The number of these most sacred sanctuaries always adds up to six, but depending on the region, the specific temples that are listed may vary. A list of the Sad Kahyangan may include:

- Pura Besakih in Karangasem, the "mother temple" of Bali
- Pura Lempuyang Luhur in Karangasem
- Pura Goa Lawah in Klungkung
- Pura Luhur Uluwatu in Badung
- Pura Luhur Batukaru in Tabanan
- Pura Pusering Jagat (Pura Puser Tasik) in Gianyar
- Pura Rambut Siwi in Jembrana Regency

== Sea temples ==
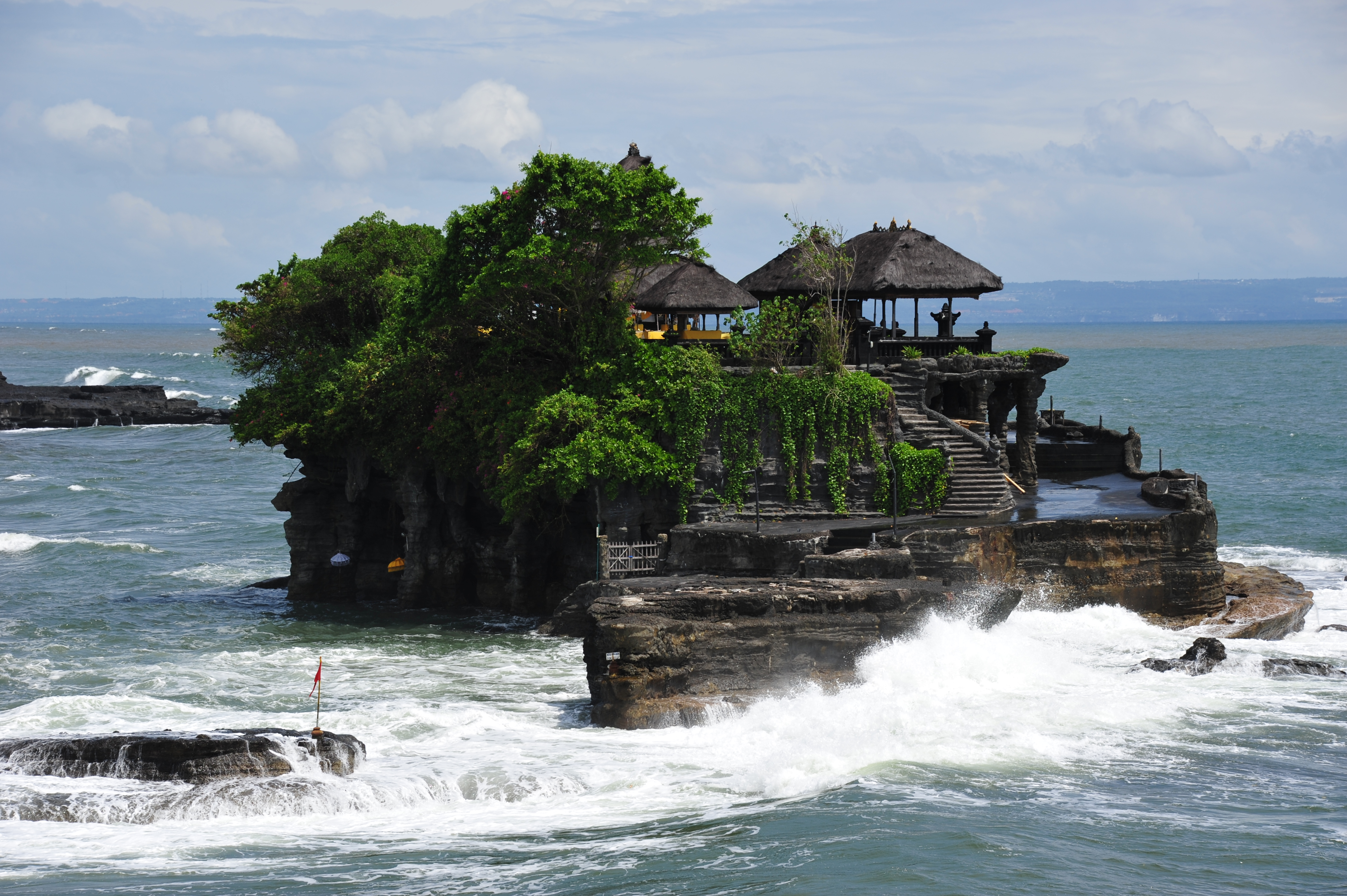
Pura Tanah Lot

Bali has several important "sea temples" (Balinese: pura segara), which were founded in the 16th century by a Majapahit sage from Java named Nirartha, to honour the gods of the sea. Each of the temples is traditionally said to be visible from the next, forming a 'chain' around the coast of Bali. Many of the most important sea temples are located along the south-west coast of the island. The temples' positions were meant to provide a chain of spiritual protection for the island.

Listed counterclockwise from Nirartha's legendary point of arrival in Bali, the seven most prominent Balinese sea temples are:

- Pura Pulaki near Pemuteran (district of Gerokgak, region of Buleleng), northeast of Gilimanuk (8°8′44″S 114°40′50″E).
- Pura Gede Perancak, 10 km south of Negara (8°24′5″S 114°36′40″E).
- Pura Rambut Siwi, 18 km east of Negara (8°24′11″S 114°45′59″E)
  A legend says that at this site, Nirartha gave a lock of his hair, which was worshipped. Rambut Siwi translates as 'worship of the hair' and the tale is reminiscent of the Buddhist story of Gautama giving eight hairs to Tapussa and Bhallika, which are now enshrined at Shwedagon.
- Pura Tanah Lot, 11 km north-west of Canggu and 13 km south-west of Tabanan city, where two puras were built on a coastal rock overlooking the Indian Ocean as a shrine to honor sea deities. (8°37′16″S 115°5′12″E).
- Pura Luhur Uluwatu, at the southwestern extremity of the Bukit Peninsula (8°49′44″S 115°5′7″E). This is the only Balinese sea temple that is also one of the six Balinese directional temples.
- Pura Mas Suka, at the southern tip of the Bukit Peninsula (southernmost point of Bali), near Greenbowl Beach (8°50′52″S 115°10′11″E).
- Pura Sakenan on Serangan island, an island south of Denpasar, between Tanjung Benoa and Sanur (8°43′31″S 115°13′47″E).

== Dang Kahyangan ==
Dang Hyang Nirartha's history, which in Bali is commonly called the History of Gede and recals his Dharmayatra (religious holy journey), is written in a lontar called Dwijendra Tatwa. 34 temples are mentioned in this document; they are called Dang Kahyangan Temples, as well as those built to honour Nirartha. Some of them are:

- Pura Yeh Jeruk in Gianyar
- Pura Pekendungan near Tanah Lot in Tabanan
- Pura Dalem Sakenan on Serangan island
- Pura Tirta Empul in Tampaksiring
- Pura Penataran Sasih in Pejeng
- Pura Dasar Bhuana in Gelgel
- Pura Kehen in Bangli

== See also ==
- Balinese Hinduism
- Balinese architecture
- Pura Besakih
- List of Hindu temples in Indonesia
- Candi of Indonesia
