= Uluwatu Temple =

Balinese Hindu temple in Indonesia

- Pura Luhur Uluwatu ᬧᬸᬭᬮᬸᬳᬸᬃᬉᬮᬸᬯᬢᬸ
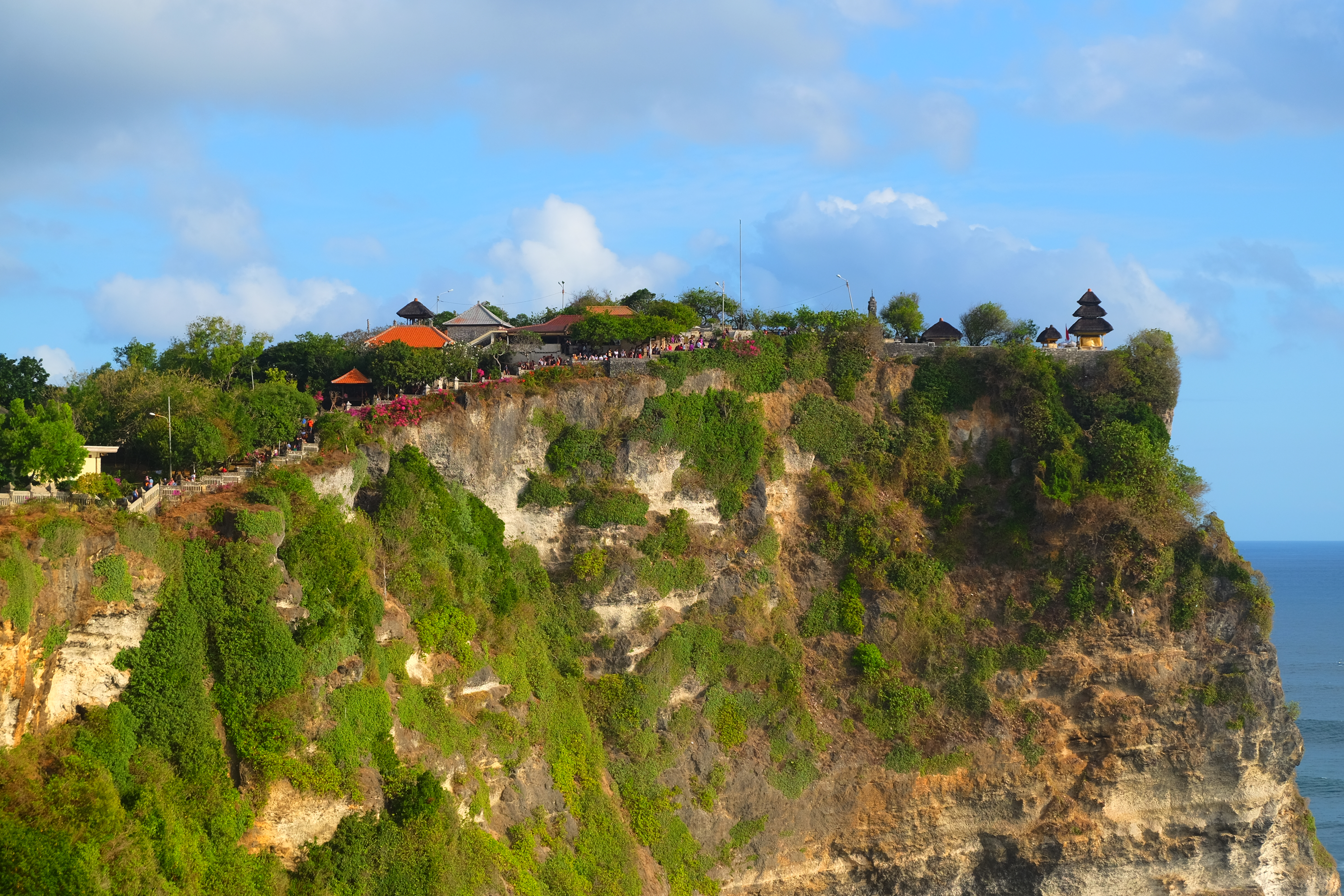

- Location in Badung Regency

Religion
- Affiliation: Hinduism
- District: South Kuta District, Badung Regency
- Deity: Sang Hyang Widhi Wasa as Rudra

Location
- Location: Bukit Peninsula, Pecatu Village
- State: Bali
- Country: Indonesia
- Coordinates: 8°49′44″S 115°5′7″E

Architecture
- Established: 11th century
- Elevation: 70 m (230 ft)

Website
- uluwatutemple.id

Uluwatu Temple (Balinese: ᬧᬸᬭᬮᬸᬳᬸᬃᬉᬮᬸᬯᬢᬸ, romanized: Pura Luhur Uluwatu) is a Balinese Hindu temple located on the south-western tip of the Bukit Peninsula in Pecatu Village (South Kuta), Badung Regency, Bali, Indonesia. It is the only Balinese sea temple (pura segara) that is also one of the nine directional temples (Pura Kahyangan Jagat or Pura Kahyangan Padma Bhuwana).

It is dedicated to Sang Hyang Widhi Wasa in his manifestation as Rudra.

== History and etymology ==
The temple (pura in Balinese) is built at the edge (ulu) of a 70-meter-high (230 ft) cliff or rock (watu) projecting into the sea. In folklore, this rock is said to be part of Dewi Danu's petrified barque.

Though a small temple is claimed to have existed earlier, the structure was significantly expanded by a Javanese sage, Empu Kuturan in the 11th century. Dang Hyang Nirartha, another sage from East Java at the turn of the 16th century, is credited for introducing the padmasana shrines and it is said that he attained moksha here, an event called ngeluhur ("to go up") locally. This has resulted in the temple's epithet Luhur ("height").

== Protection zoning: customary law and state law ==
In 2009, a spatial planning regulation (Bali Provincial Regulation No. 16, planning for 20 years up to 2029) delineated a 5 km radius zone, taken from the temple's outer wall, for which any construction would be prohibited other than building in connection with Hindu religious spiritual facilities. Thus buildings for settlements and tourist activities were both outlawed.

This came into conflict with customary laws (awig-awig) of the Pecatu village community, which regulated the space of the Uluwatu temple based on the perception that the sacred space of Uluwatu temple is the Uluwatu temple forest. It also came into conflict with the reality of the land, whereby the customary law firmly protected the forest with a 350 m radius of the temple; but if the government law was to be applied, many pre-existing buildings would have to be demolished and as many people deprived from either their own roof or their mean of sustenance — or both.

No less than seven lawsuits were brought to courts of law by individuals, groups and customary law communities from Pecatu — up to the Supreme Court, who rejected these appeals in 2010 and 2013. However, in 2015 the Provincial Government issued Regulation Number 8 as a follow-up to the Supreme Court 2013 decision, which established three types of protection for all temples, each with three zones (core zone, buffer zone and utilisation zone) of varying proportions according to the degree of urbanisation in the area surrounding the temples. Uluwatu Temple came as type II, with a core zone of up to 1 km radius; a buffer zone of 1 km to 2.5 km radius, and a utilisation zone of 2.5 km to 5 km radius.

== Monkeys ==
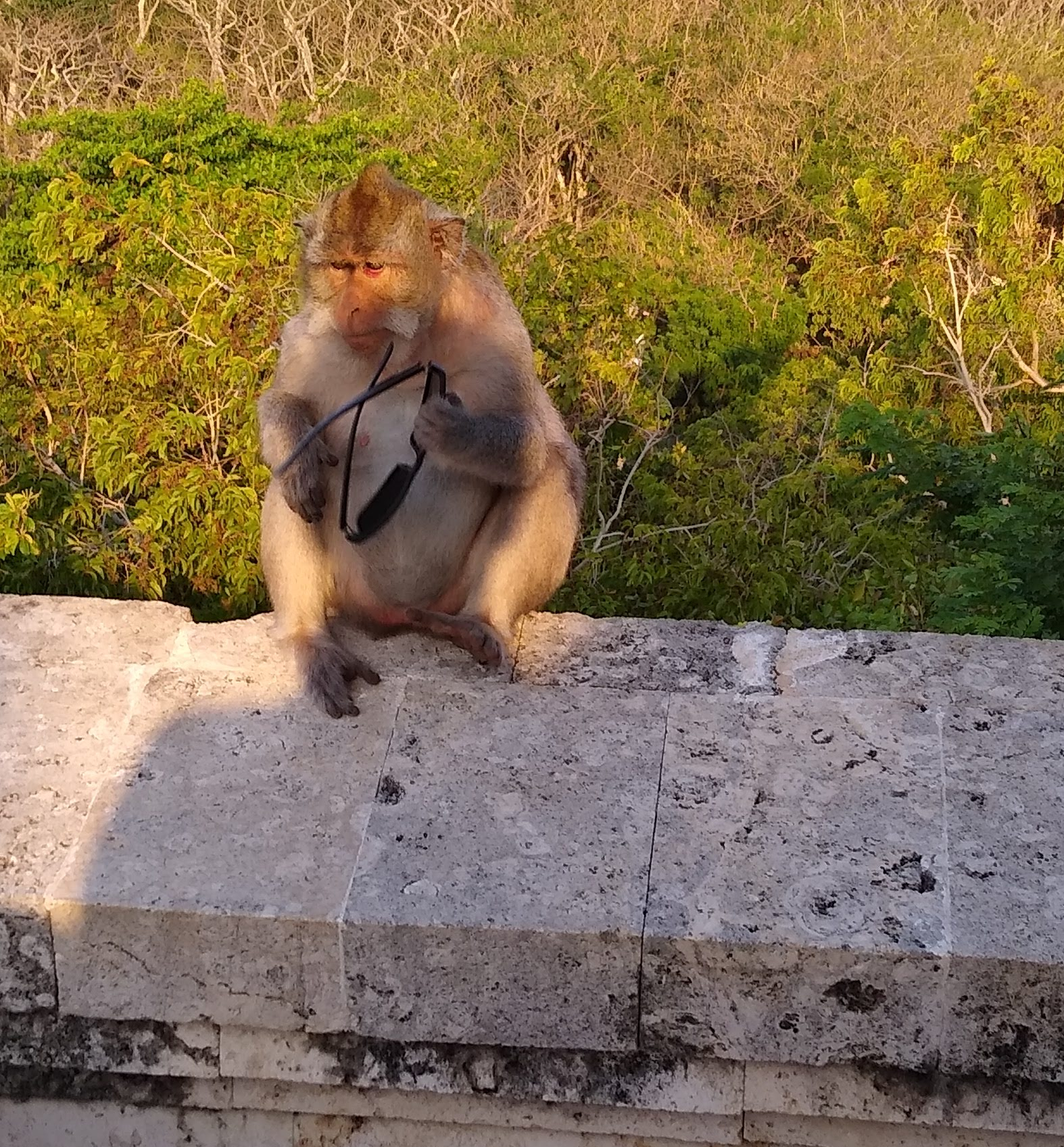
A monkey holding a pair of stolen sunglasses

A monkey stealing a tourist's pom-poms

The temple is inhabited by long-tailed macaques (Macaca fascicularis), who are notorious for snatching visitors' belongings such as flip-flops, cameras and sunglasses. They can usually be persuaded into ransoming the items for fruit, nuts, or candies, although this only encourages them to steal more.

Scientists and experts on primate behavior have conducted studies on the Macaque monkeys in the area and have collected data suggesting that they learn bartering behavior. This trade is passed down to the young offspring. New groups of macaque monkeys introduced into the area quickly adapt and learn the new skill from the locals.

== Kecak dance performance ==
A Kecak dance performance based on the Ramayana is performed daily in Uluwatu temple every 6pm on the cliff-side. This outdoor performance has a sunset background.

Cultural tourism destinations outside the Uluwatu Temple are the 4 (four) major cultural tourism destinations in Bali which are the priority scale for revitalizing the development of tourism areas by the Bali provincial government; 35
