= Pura Rambut Siwi =

Hindu temple in Bali, Indonesia

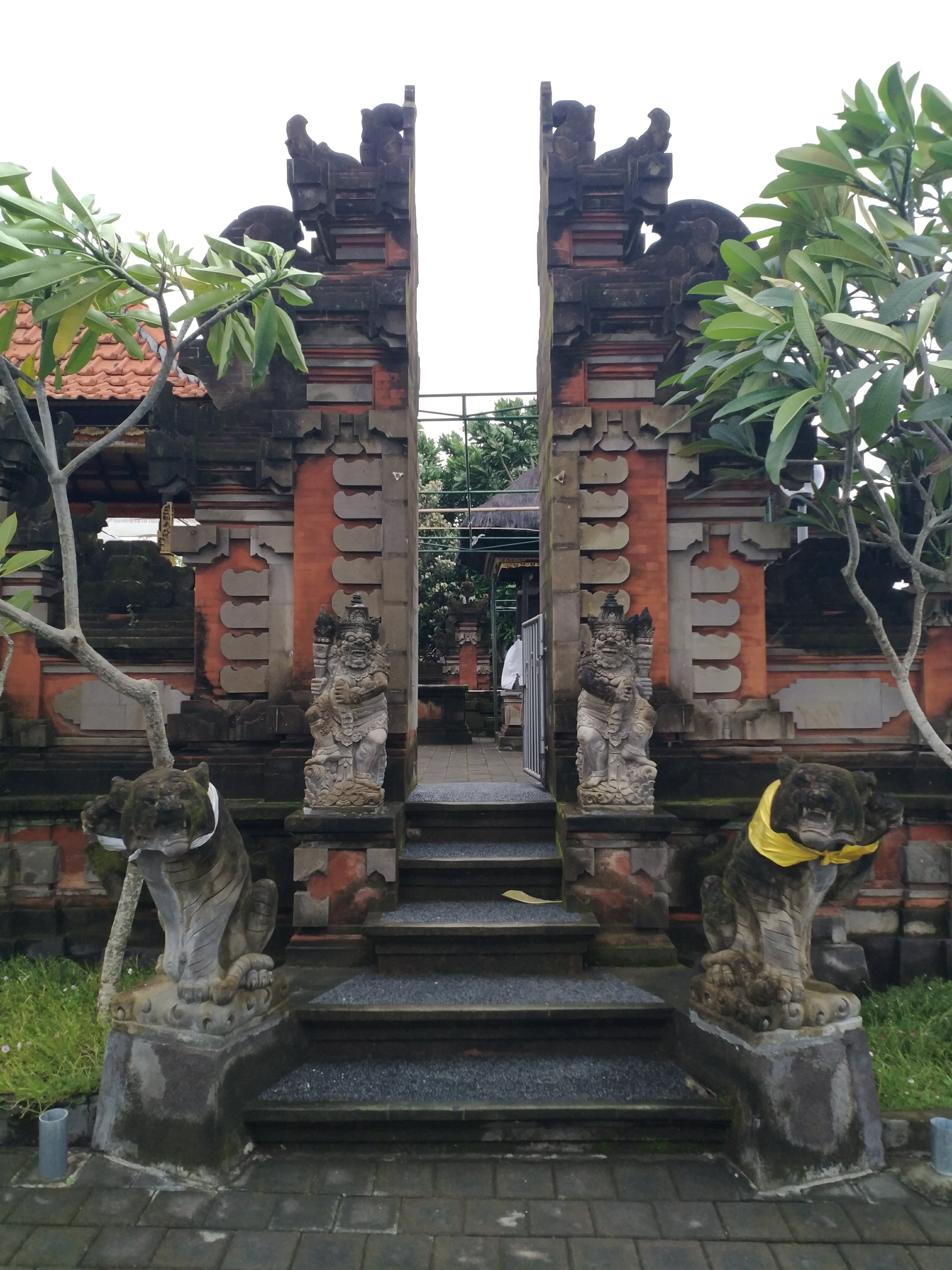
- Entrance split gate (candi bentar)

- Location within Bali

General information
- Type: Pura
- Architectural style: Balinese
- Location: Yeh Embang Kangin, Mendoyo district, Jembrana Regency, Indonesia
- Coordinates: 8°24′11″S 114°45′57″E
- Elevation: 40 m (130 ft)

Pura Rambut Siwi is a sea temple in Mendoyo district, Jembrana Regency, west Bali, Indonesia. It is sometimes cited as one of the six "sanctuaries of the world".

== Location ==
Pura Rambut Siwi stands between Yeh Satang and Yeh Embang, on Yeh Embang Kangin territory, overlooking the beach, 500 m south off the coastal road between Pulukan (3,5 km east) and Jehembang (2 km west). Mendoyo, the district capital, is 10 km west.

This temple has an annex on the main road Denpasar - Gilimanuk: Pura Pesanggrahan Rambut Siwi, whose purpose is to bless travellers for a safe journey.

== Etymology ==
The word rambut means "hair", an allusion to the legend that Nirartha left a lock of his hair to protect the temple. Siwi means "venerated".

== Description ==
Pura Rambut Siwi is one of the seven most important sea temples (Balinese: pura segara) of Bali; and some cite it as one of the six "sanctuaries of the world". It is the biggest temple in the Jembrana regency. It is built of red bricks, with nice reliefs depicting scenes from the ancient play Arjuna Wiwaha. A long flight of steps reaches down to the dark sand beach, where there are several cave temples. In one of the caves, a water temple (pura tirta) is guarded by a statue of Nirartha. Further on, another cave (Goa Mayan Sati) is forbidden to visitors: it is used by priests to prepare themselves for ordination. (Note: Other temples of the Rambut Siwi temple complex are given as Pura Melanting, Pura Gading Wani and Pura Ratu Gede Dalem Peed, but this needs further sourcing.) That beach is also a surf spot.

The temple has seen several renovations, the most important of which being its relocation to the peak of the hill.

Pura Rambut Siwi

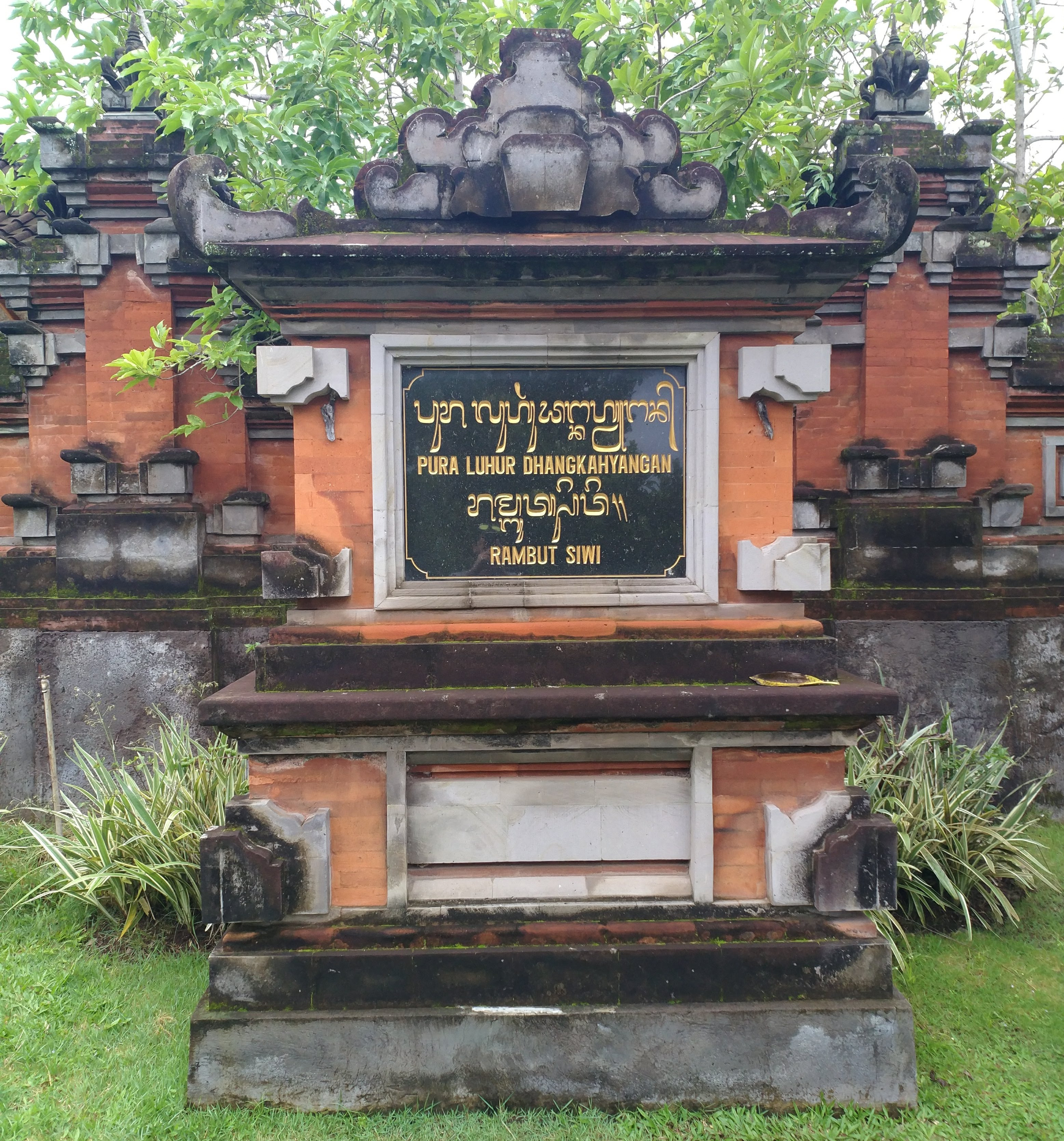
Plaque near the entrance

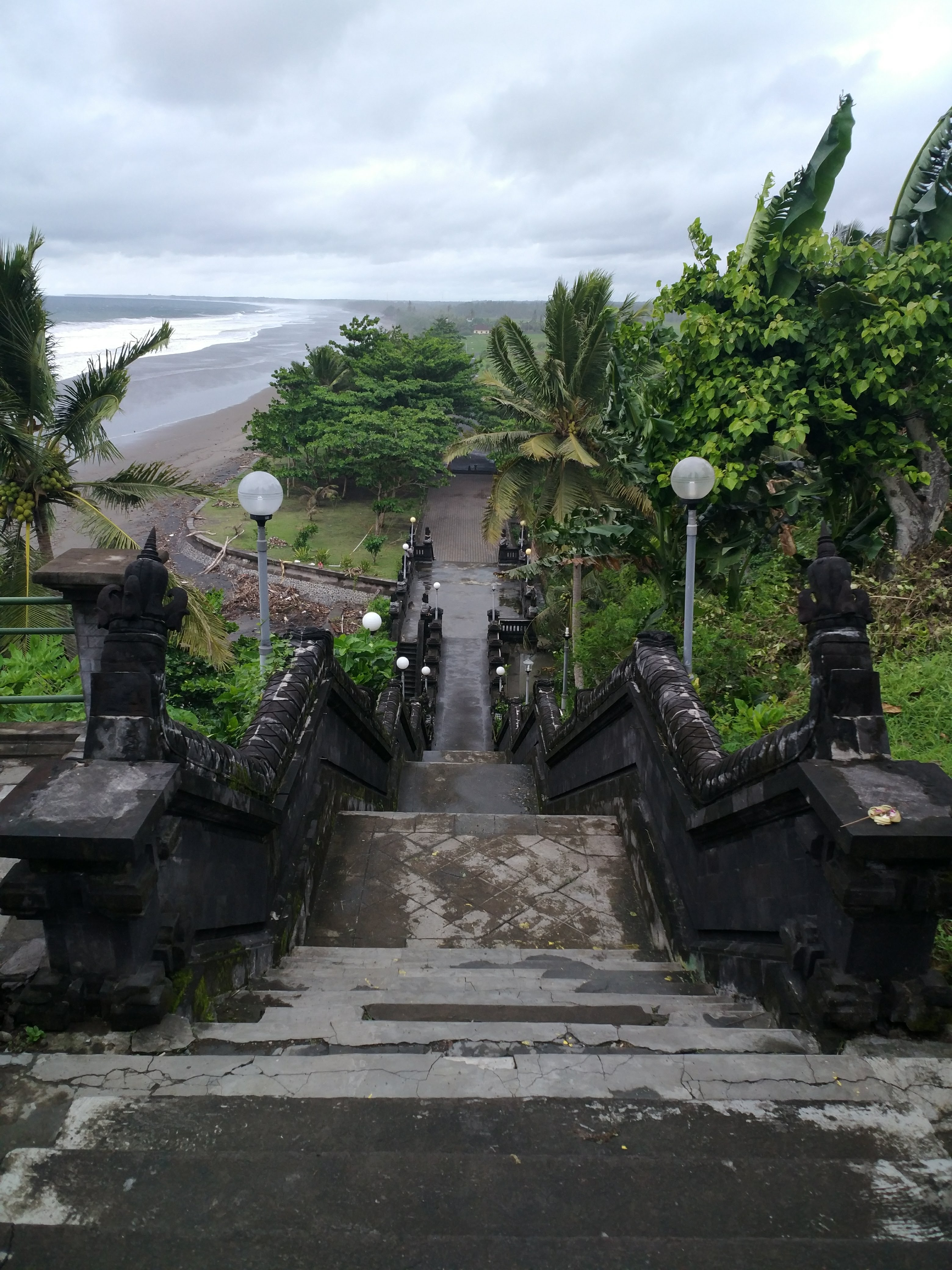
Stairs to the beach, looking west

== See also ==
- Hinduism in Indonesia
- Pura Ulun Danu Bratan
- Besakih
