= Pura Pulaki =

Hindu temple in Bali, Indonesia

- Interactive map of the Pura Pulaki area

General information
- Type: Pura
- Architectural style: Balinese
- Location: Pulaki, Seririt Subdistrict, Singaraja, Bali, Indonesia, Jl. Singaraja-Gilimanuk, Banyupoh, Gerokgak, Kabupaten Buleleng, Bali 81155
- Coordinates: 8°08′44″S 114°40′49″E
- Estimated completion: 1489

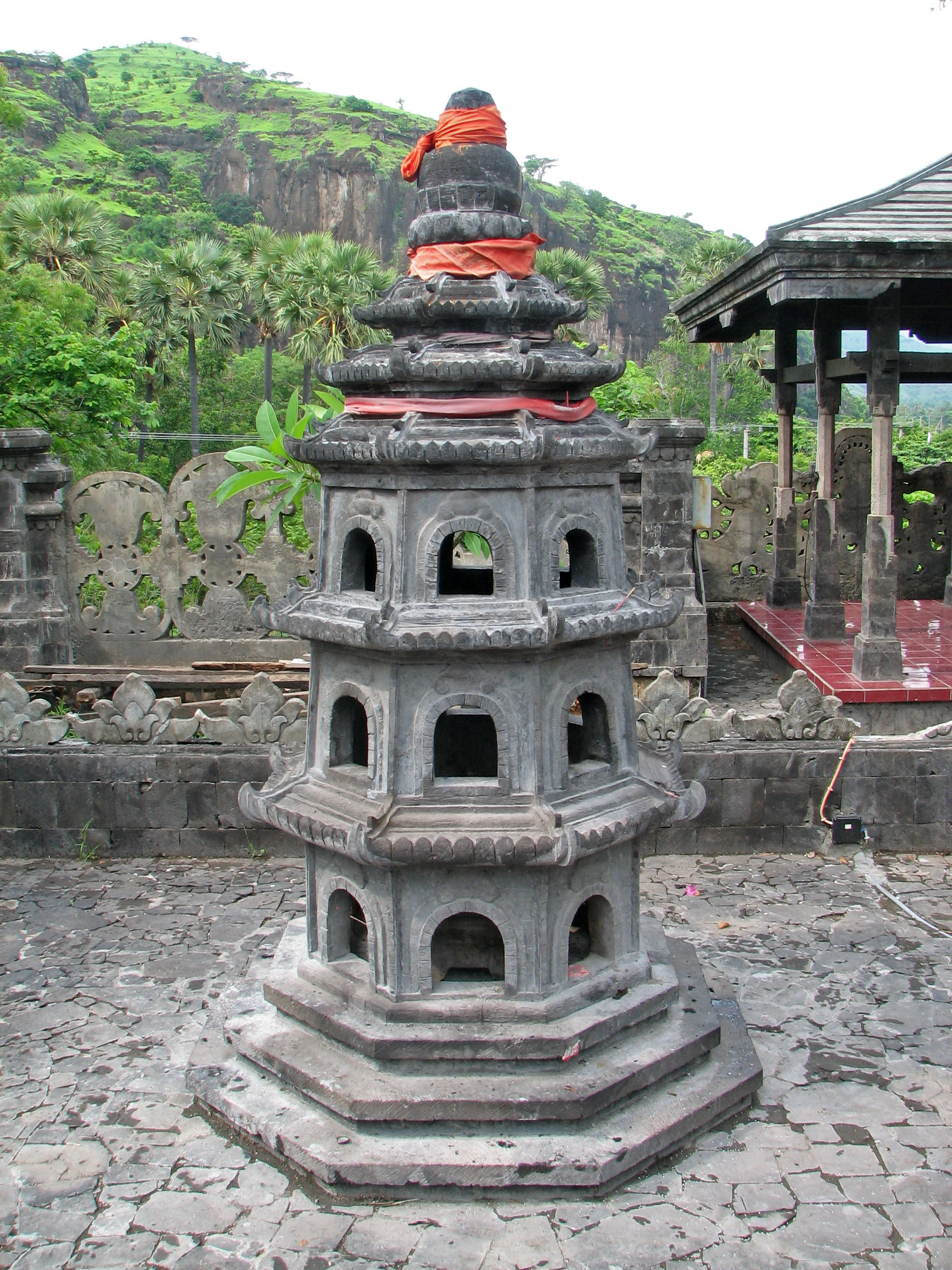
Hindu temple in Pura Pulaki

Pura Pulaki is a Balinese Hindu temple, or a pura, located to the west of Singaraja, Bali, Indonesia. The temple is set on flat land with rocky outcrops as the backdrop. Pura Pulaki is a pura segara or Balinese sea temples, set around the island to form a chain of temples which protect the island.

== History ==
The area of Pulaki has been inhabited since the prehistoric age. Several stone tools shaped like axe were discovered in Pura Melanting, a temple near Pura Pulaki, in 1987. The area of Pura Pulaki may have been a center of a pre-Hindu religion which makes use of a religious building in the form of a staged pyramid. Geographically, Pulaki forms a safe haven which provides a resting place for sea traders between Java ana Maluku. In the 14th century, Pulaki was recorded as the center for the development of Vaishnavism, a sect in Hinduism.

In the late 15th century, Dang Hyang Nirartha, a Hindu priest or Brahmin from the Majapahit kingdom of Java, arrived in Bali to introduce the Shaivite priesthood in Bali. Nirartha built several temples on Bali including the Pura Pulaki in 1489, the year considered to be the establishment of Pura Pulaki. Local legend mentioned that upon his arrival, Nirartha was escorted by the macaques from the forest into the spot where the Pura Pulaki would be built.

Afterwards, Pura Pulaki was abandoned. In 1920, the Dutch colonial government rented the area of Pulaki to a Chinese trader named Ang Tek What. The area, including the temple, was taken over by the Indonesian government in 1950 and was restored and protected.

== Temple compound ==
Pura Pulaki is the main temple of a group of temples surrounding the area, called Pesanakan. The surrounding temples around Pura Pulaki are Pura Pemuteran, which is popular for its hot springs, Pura Kerta Kawat, and Pura Pabean. Pura Pulaki is situated by the beach Pantai Gondol.

Pura Pulaki is a pura segara or "sea temples", which were founded in the 16th century also by Nirartha. Pura segara were built to honor the deities of the sea. Each of the pura segara is traditionally said to be visible from the next, forming a 'chain' around the coast of Bali. Many of the most important sea temples are located along the south-west coast of the island. The temples' positions were meant to provide a chain of spiritual protection for the Bali island.

Like all pura, Pura Pulaki is divided into three areas: the outer sanctum of the temple (jaba pisan or nistaning mandala), the middle sanctum (jaba tengah or madya mandala), and the inner main sanctum (jero or utamaning mandala).

The outer sanctum or jaba pisan is the outermost courtyard of the temple. Entry to the outer sanctum of Pura Pulaki is marked by a candi bentar split gate. This candi bentar is flanked by two towering bale kulkul, a pavilion where the drum to call for prayers is kept.

The inner sanctum or jero is the most sacred part of a Balinese temple. Entry into the inner sanctum is marked by a portal structure known as paduraksa. The black-stone paduraksa of Pura Pulaki is decorated with figures of Naga Basuki, a dragon which maintain the balance of the cosmos. The paduraksa of Pura Pulaki was built in 1983.

== See also ==
- Balinese temple

== Cited works ==
- Auger, Timothy, ed. (2001). Bali & Lombok. Eyewitness Travel Guides. London: Dorling Kindersley. ISBN 0751368709.
- Stuart-Fox, David (1999). Fox, James J. (ed.). Religion and Ritual: Balinese Hindu Temples. Indonesian Heritage. Singapore: Archipelago Press. ISBN 9813018585.
- Pringle, Robert (1999). A Short History of Bali: Indonesia's Hindu Realm. Crows Nest: Allan & Unwin. ISBN 1-86508-863-3.
