= Pura Gede Perancak =

Hindu temple in Bali, Indonesia

- Location within Bali

General information
- Type: Temple
- Architectural style: Balinese
- Location: Yeh Kuning, Jembrana District, Jembrana Regency, Indonesia
- Coordinates: 8°24′04″S 114°36′40″E

Pura Gede Perancak is a prominent Hindu sea temple in Perancak, Bali, Indonesia. This temple commemorates the site of Dang Hyang Nirartha's arrival in Bali in 1546.

== Etymology ==
The name 'Perancak' comes from ancak, meaning "broken", "destroyed"; an allusion to the legend whereby I Gusti Ngurah, the village leader, challenged Nirartha and the latter causing a stone to split - that upon which Gusti Ngurah had been sitting.

== History ==
Formerly known as “Tanjung Ketapang,” the village was transformed during the collapse of the Majapahit Kingdom - which brought significant cultural shifts in the region.

The original Pura Perancak temple was situated on a hill on the Muslim side of the river (the Pengambengan side) but was relocated to the marshlands on the Perancak side. Since then, it has been reconstructed twice. Its last rebuilding as an important pura dang kahyangan, a temple associated to Nirartha, contributes to anchoring the Hindu community in a predominantly Muslim area - especially as the status of dang kahyangan puts the temple on the Hindu holy water pilgrimage which extends as far as India.
There is another temple further along the coast: Pura Tamba in Yeh Kuning; it is not integrated into its local community: it promotes a spiritual teacher and residential followers - who practice meditation and yoga -, and this setting is foreign to Balinese spirituality. The local Hindu village refuses to take charge of the ritual responsibilities in this temple.

== Other ==
Buffalo races (makepung lampit) are organized in Perancak each 28 of the month between July and November, gathering some 250 participants (pepadu) each year.
