= Tanah Lot =

Rock formation off the coast of Bali, Indonesia

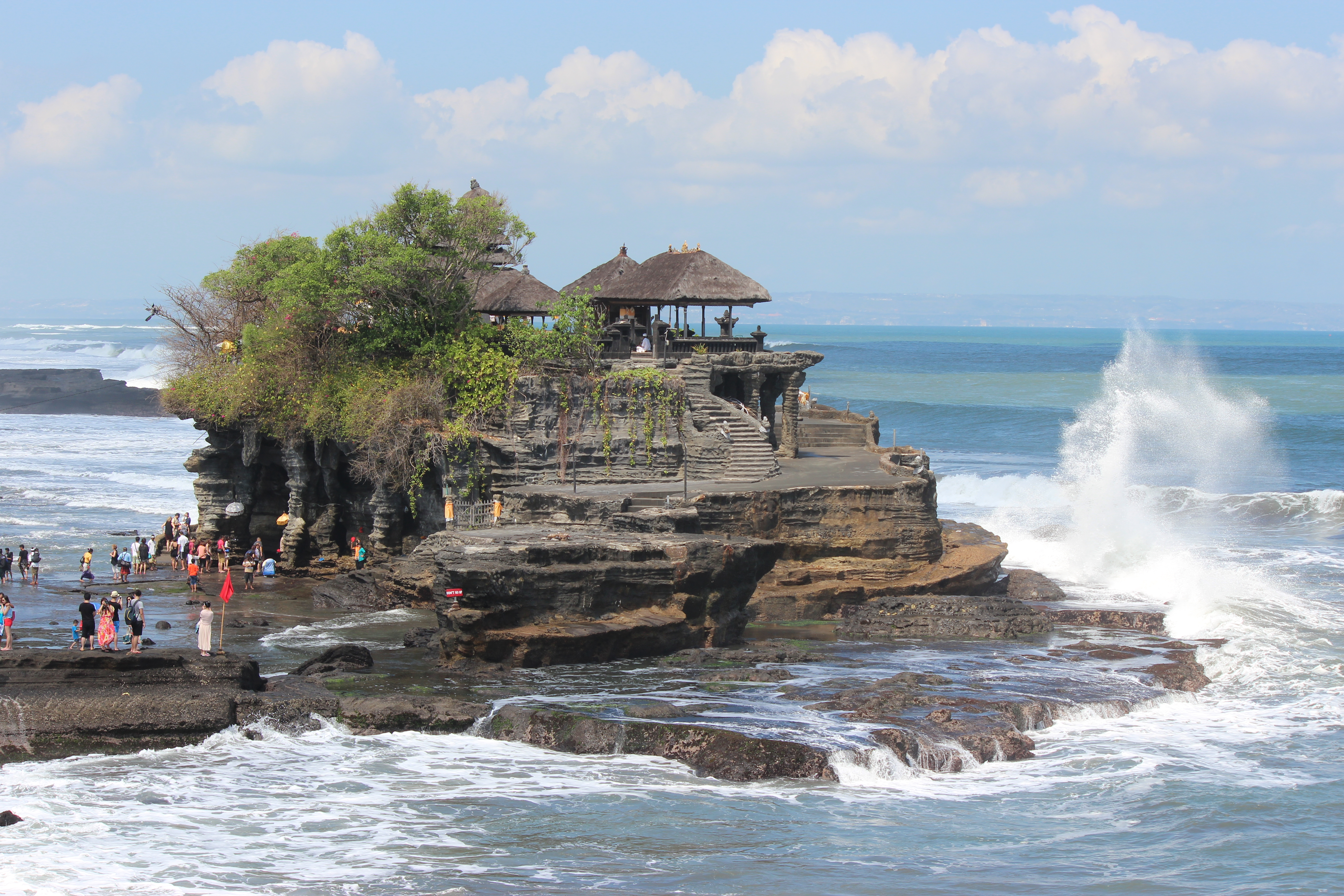
- Pura Tanah Lot

- Location within Bali Location within Indonesia

Geography
- Location: Indonesia
- Coordinates: 8.62107°S 115.08716°E

Tanah Lot (Balinese: ᬢᬦᬄᬮᭀᬢ᭄) is a rock formation off the Indonesian island of Bali. It is home to the ancient Hindu pilgrimage temple Pura Tanah Lot (literally "Tanah Lot temple"), a popular tourist and cultural icon for photography.

== Location ==
Tanah Lot is in Beraban, Kediri district, Tabanan Regency, approximately 13 kilometres (8.1 mi) south of Tabanan and 20 kilometres (12 mi) northwest of Denpasar. It sits on a large offshore rock and is only accessible on foot at low tide.

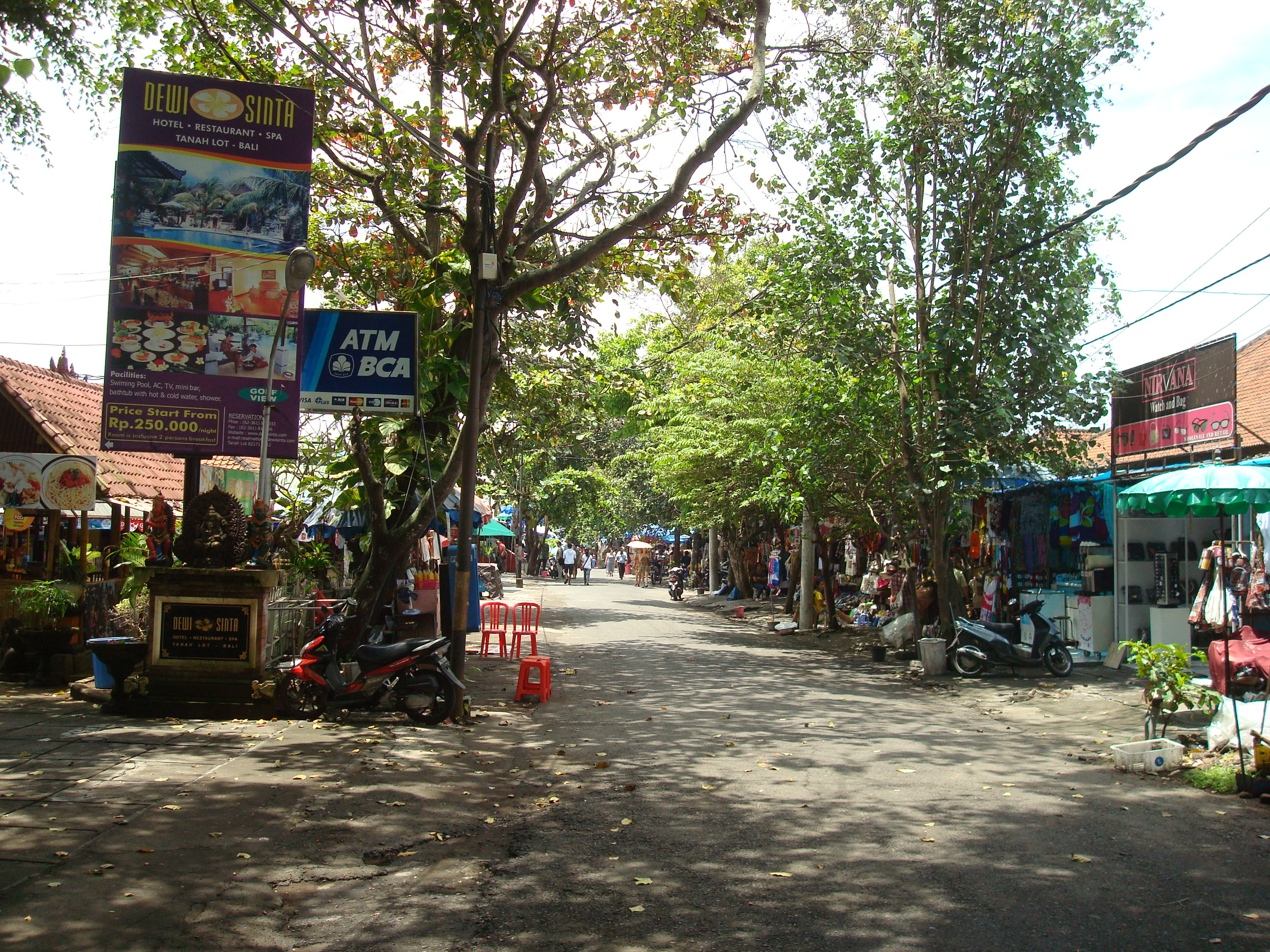
Tanah Lot

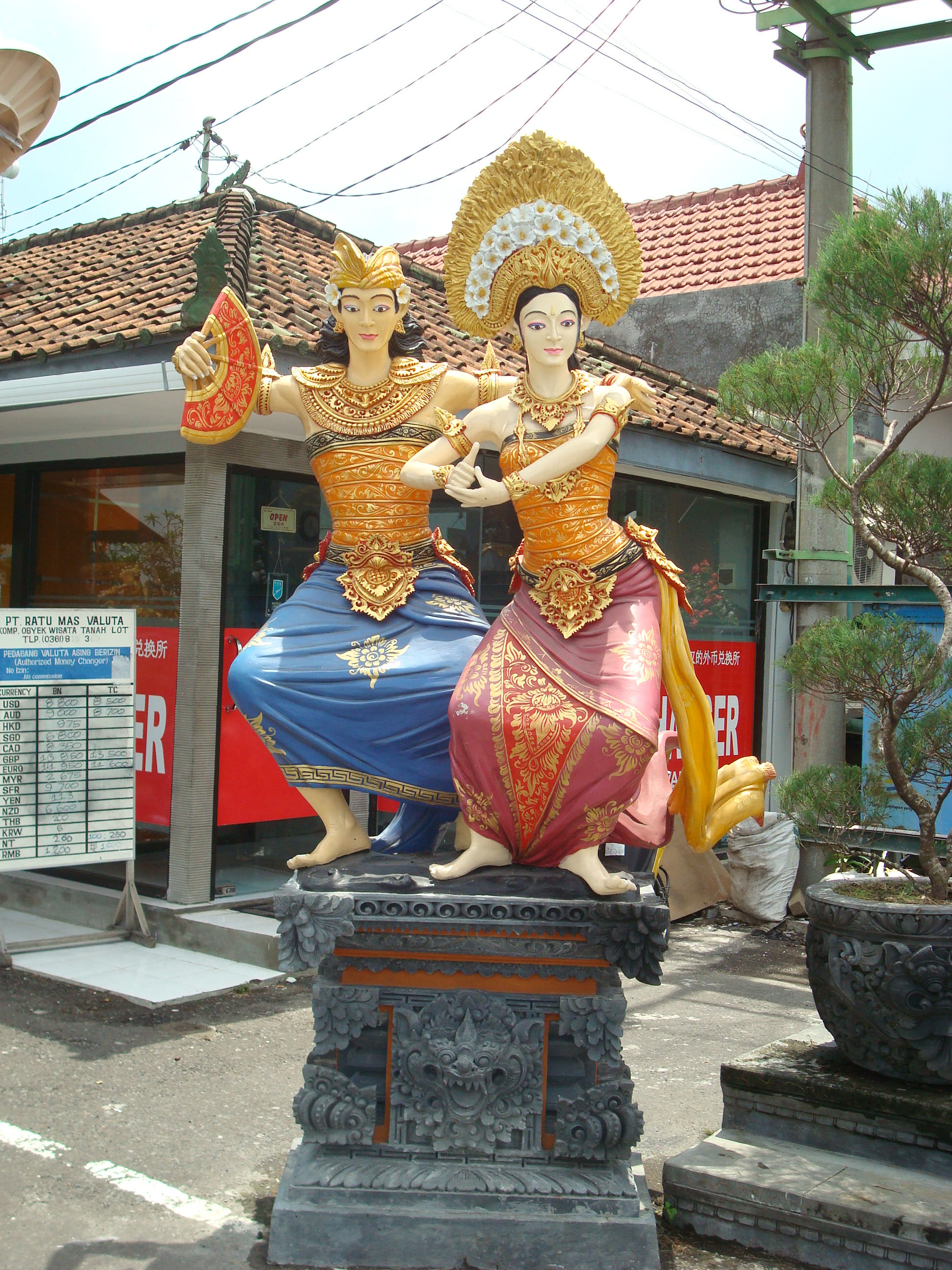
Statue in Tanah Lot

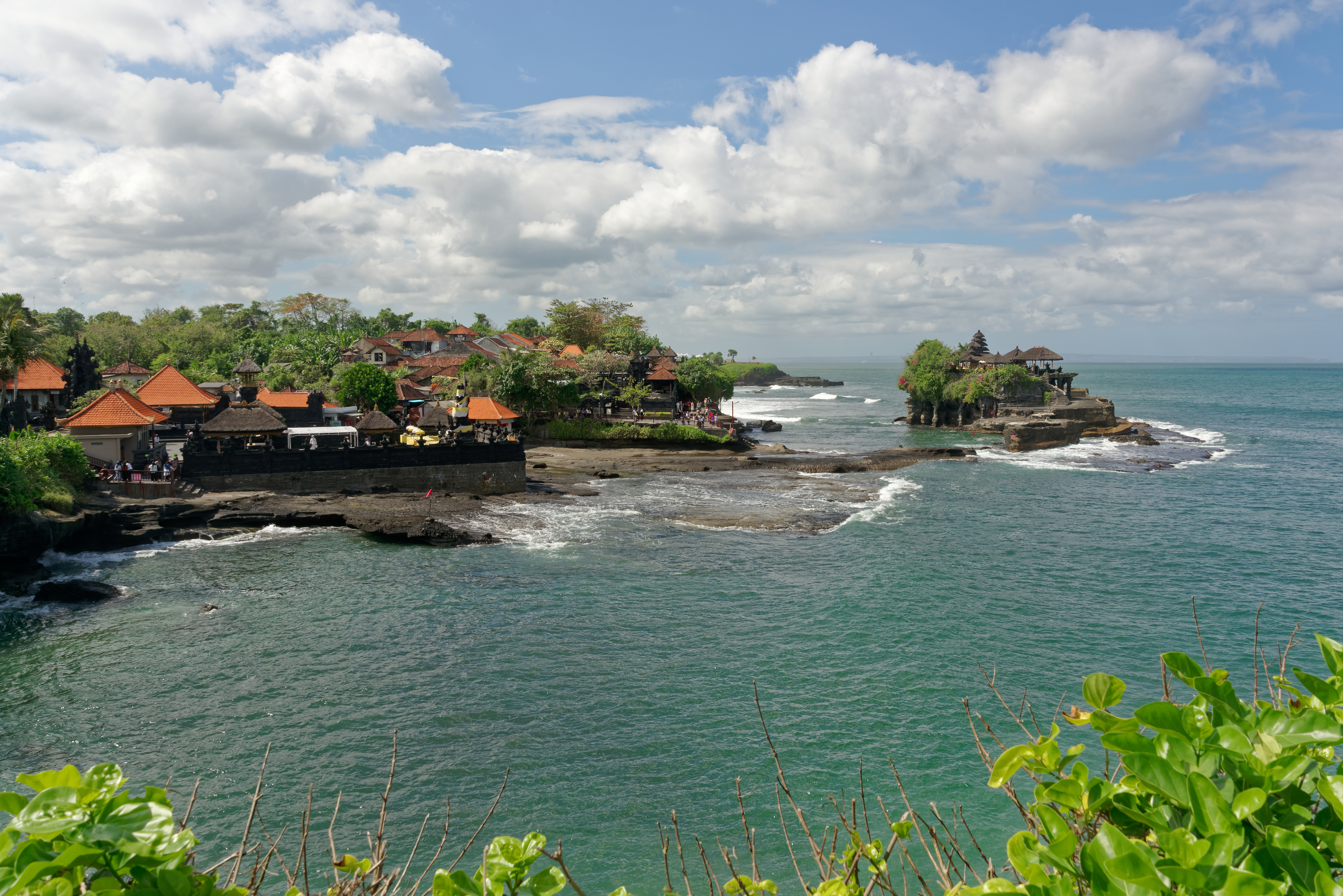
General view

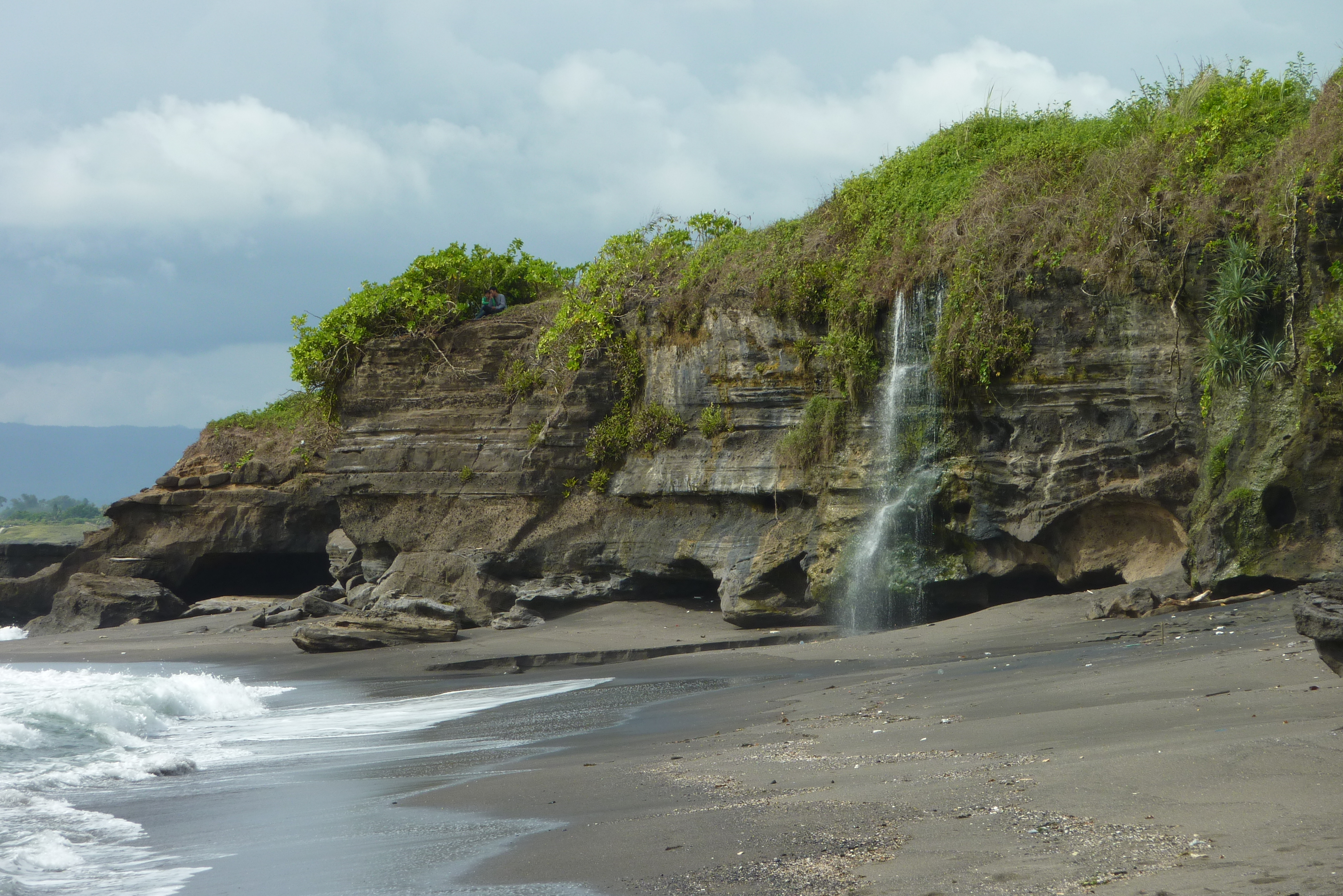
Nearby cliffs

== Tanah Lot temple ==
Tanah Lot is one of the seven main Balinese "sea temples", located along the southwestern coast of the island. The name means "land [in the] sea" in the Balinese language. The main deity of the temple is Dewa Baruna, or Bhatara Segara, the sea god, or sea power.

Tanah Lot is claimed to be the work of the 16th-century religious figure Dang Hyang Nirartha, who was significantly influenced by Hinduism and who allegedly spent a night there in the course of his extensive travels in Bali, Lombok, and Sumbawa. (Note: Nirartha's travels are recounted in a lontara called Dwijendra Tatwa, which has been digitized and is available online at archive.org.) Nirartha is also worshipped at Tanah Lot.

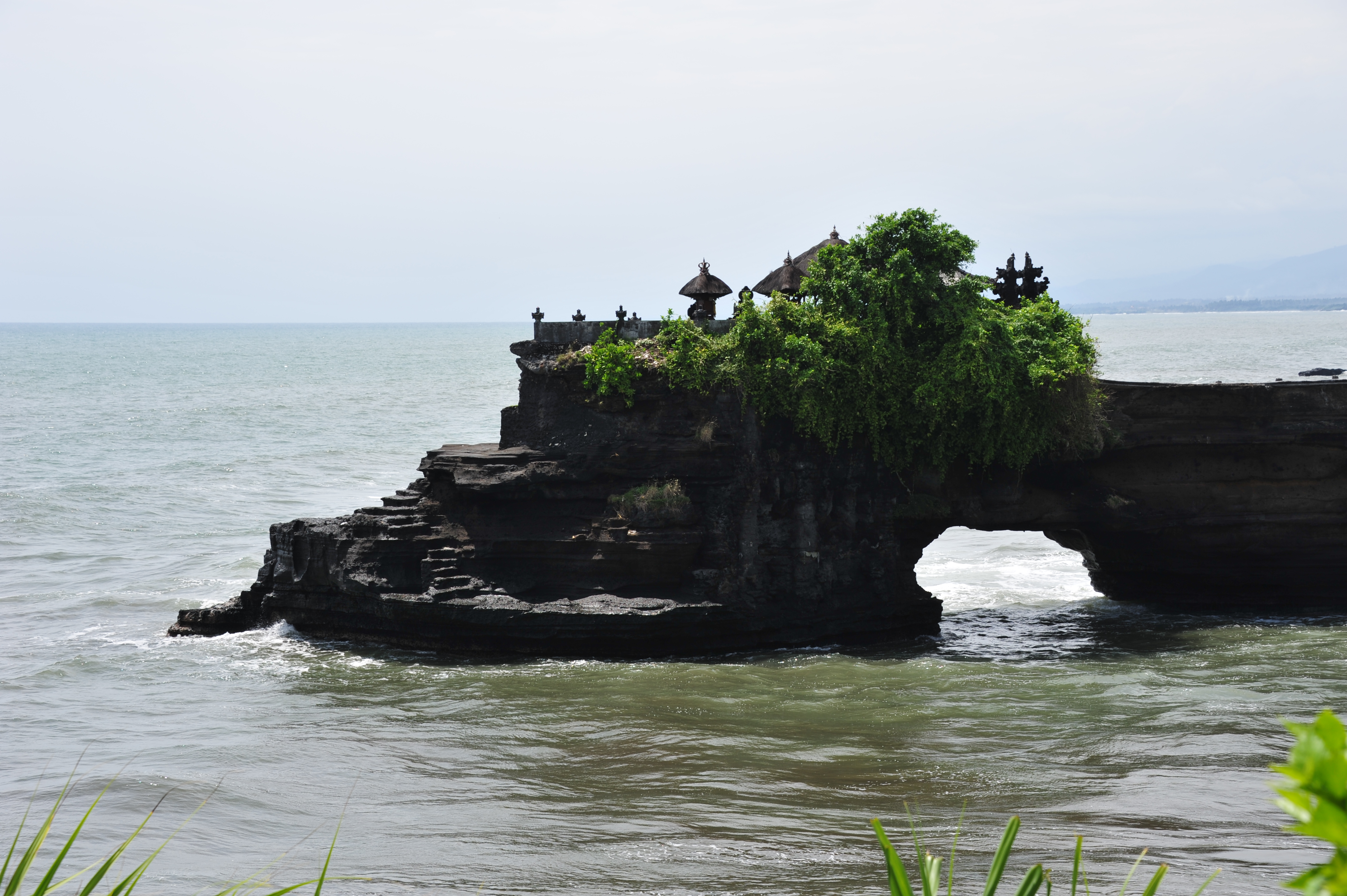
Pura Batu Bolong, some 300 m north of Pura Tanah Lot

=== Restoration ===
In the 1980s, the temple's rock face started to crumble, and the area around and inside the temple became dangerous. The Japanese government then provided a loan to the Indonesian government of Rp 800 billion (approximately US$480 million) to conserve the historic temple and other significant locations around Bali. As a result, over one-third of Tanah Lot's "rock" is disguised artificial rock created during the Japanese-funded and supervised renovation and stabilization program.

=== Tourism ===
According to a 2019 study, Tanah Lot is one of the most visited places in Indonesia, averaging 500,000 tourists each year.

To reach the temple, visitors must walk through a set of outdoor souvenir shops that cover each side of a path down to the sea. On the mainland clifftops, there are restaurants.

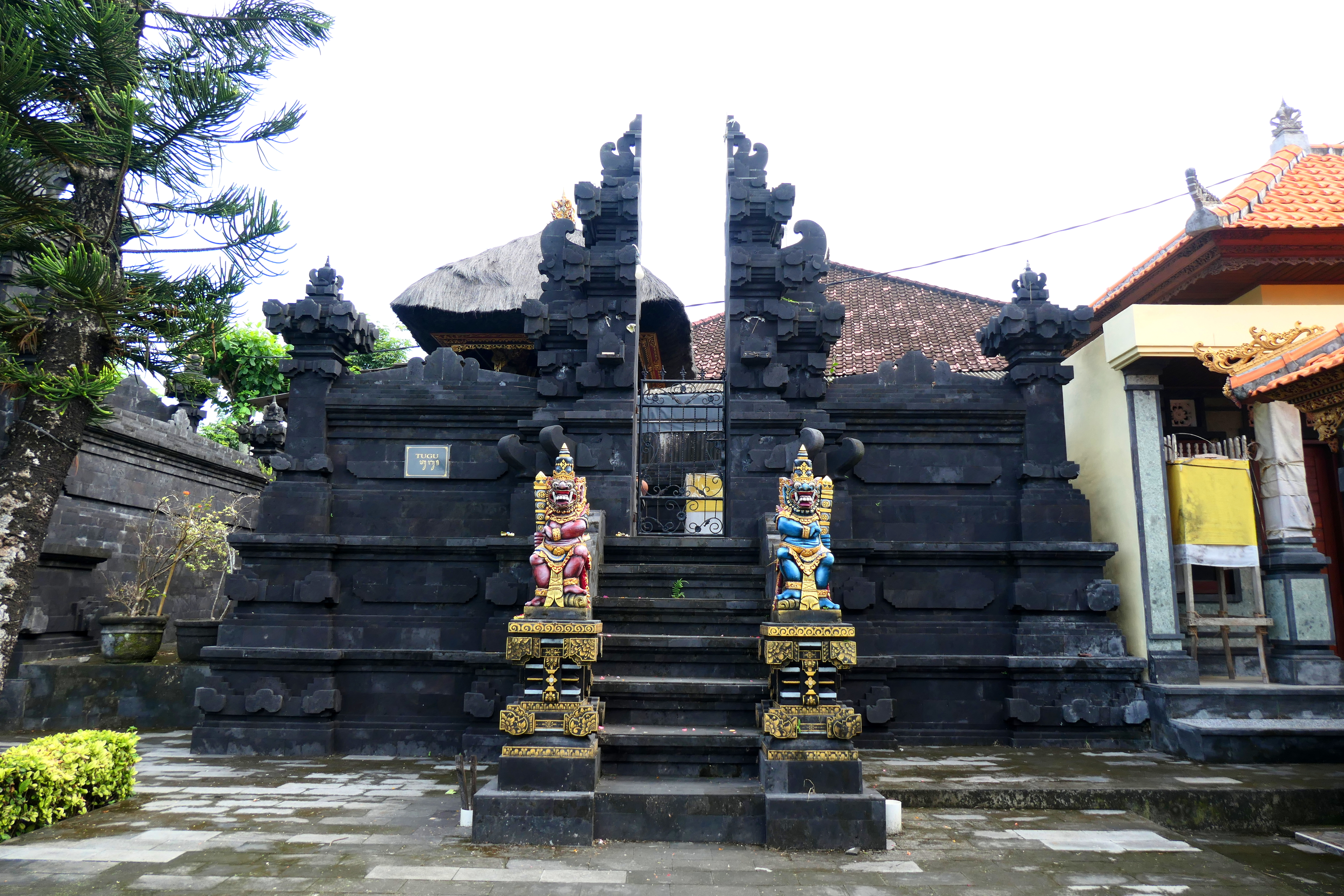
Guardians of the gate

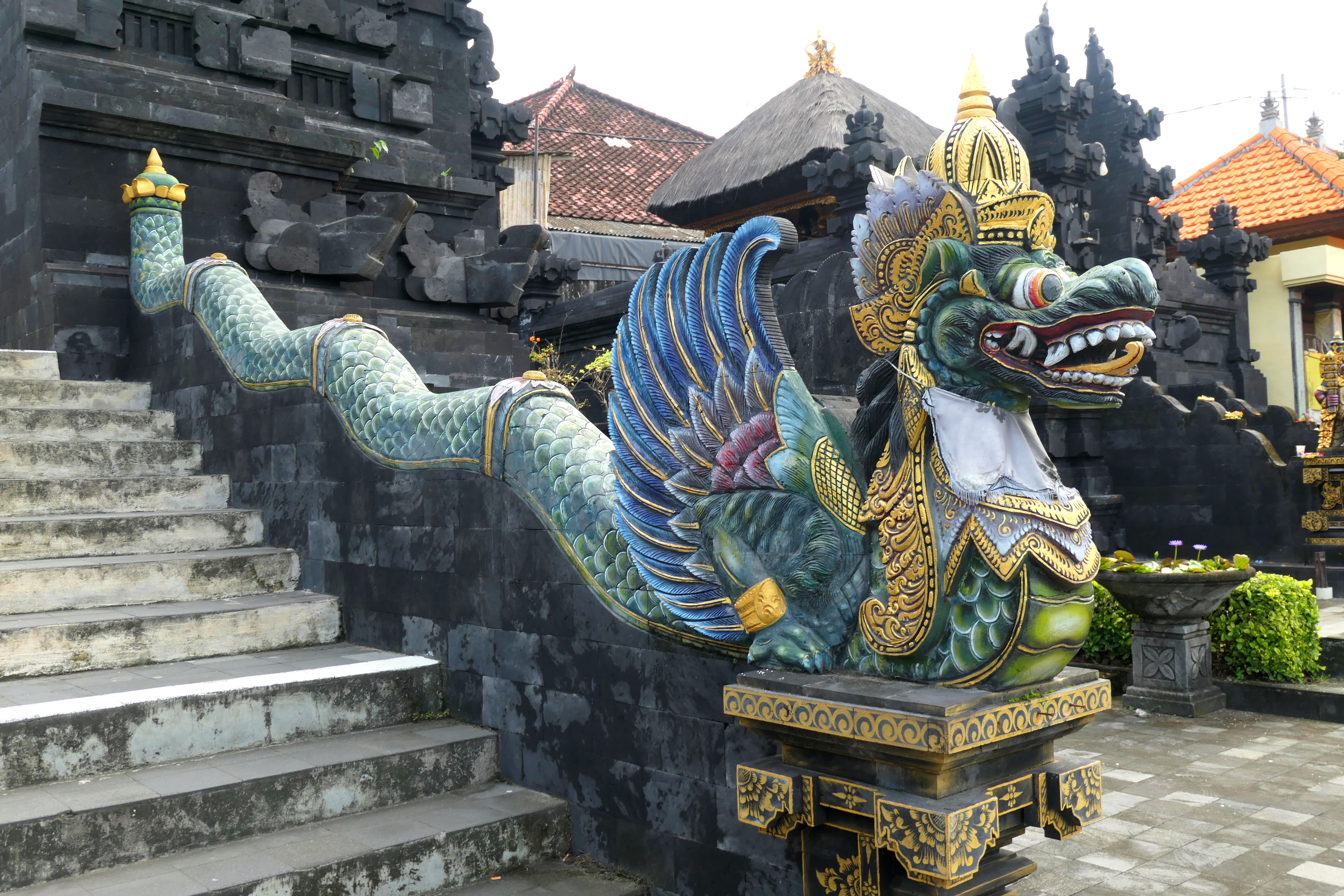
Stair dragon

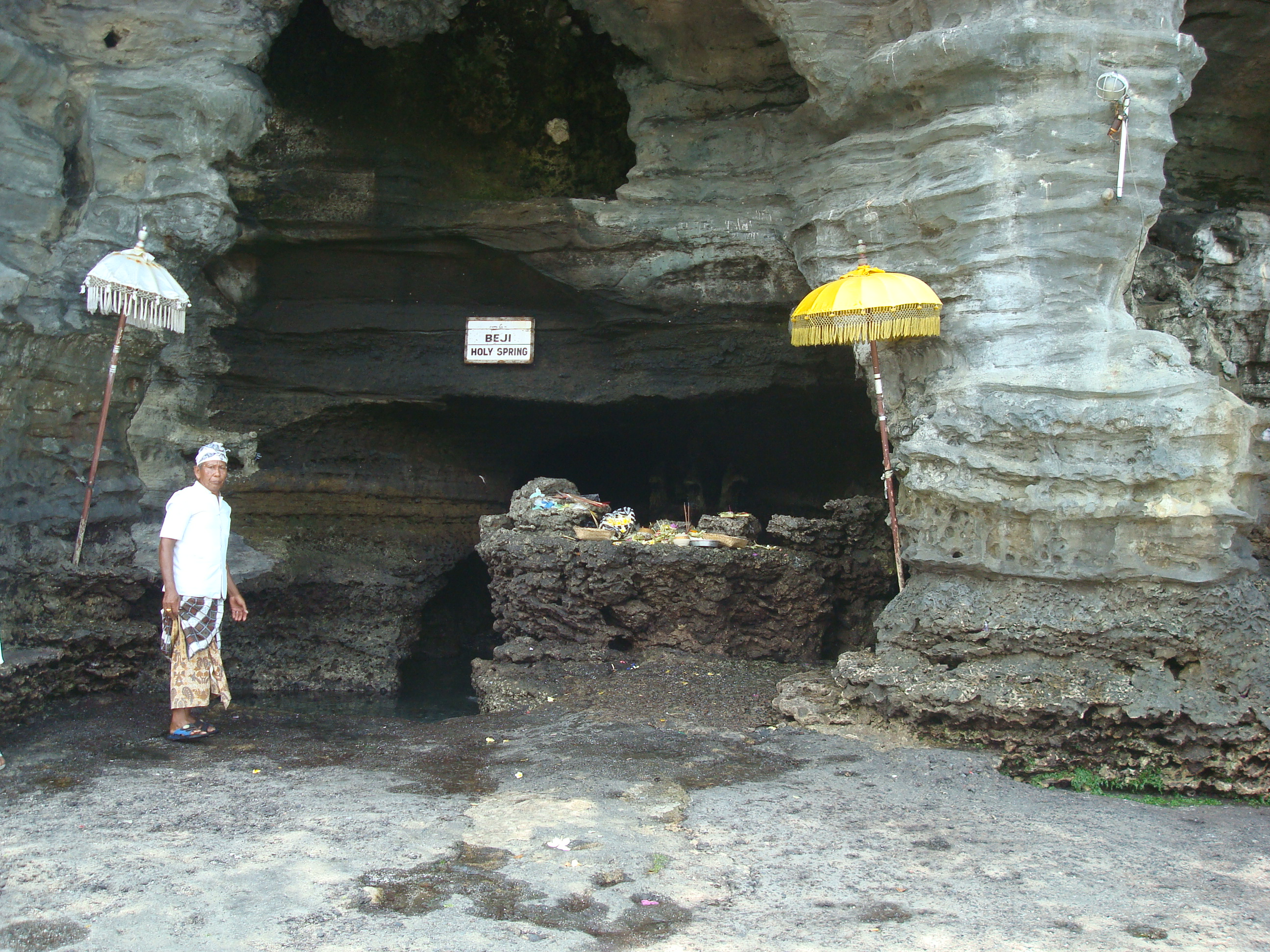
Sacred water at Tanah Lot temple

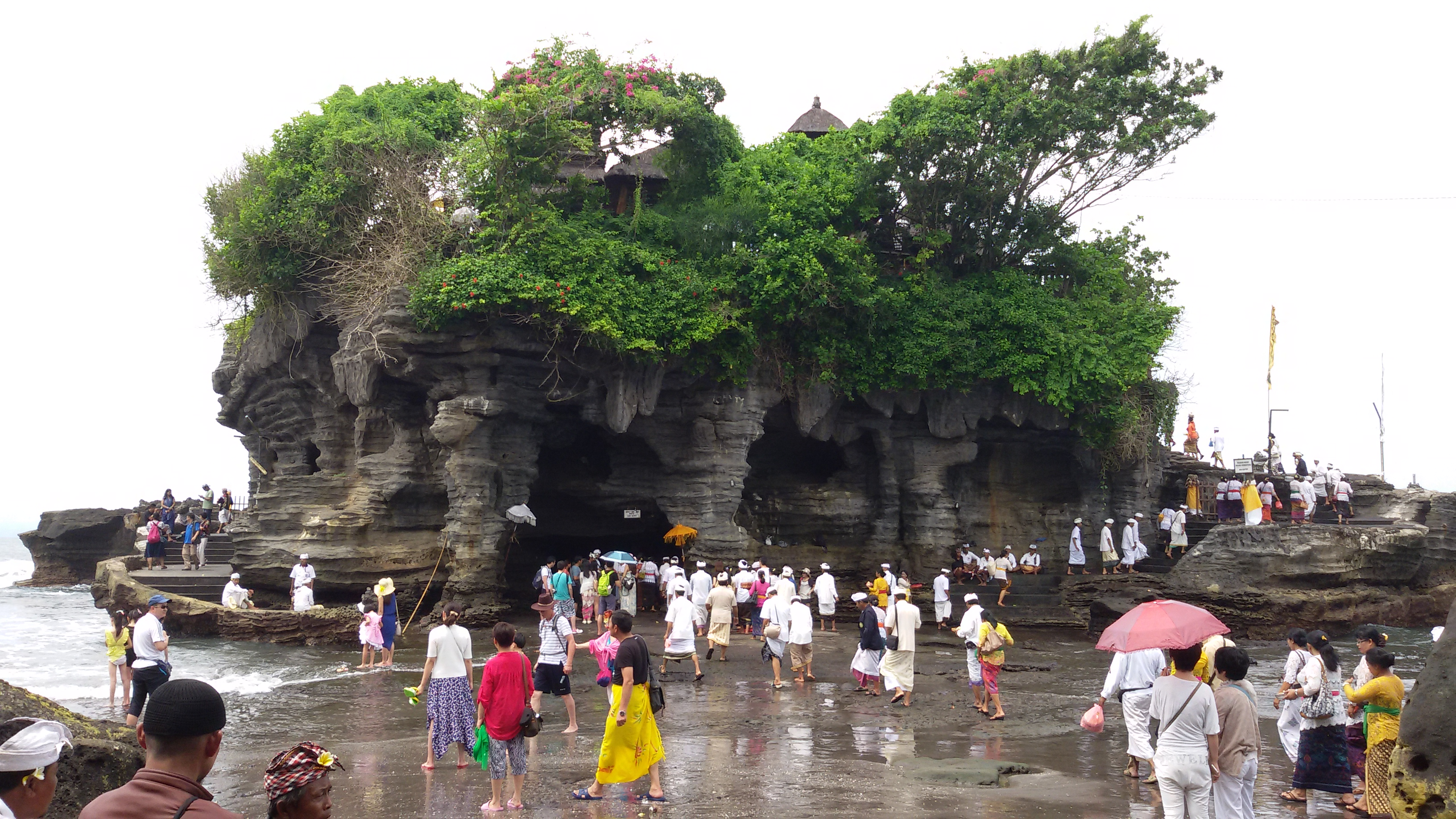
Odalan ritual

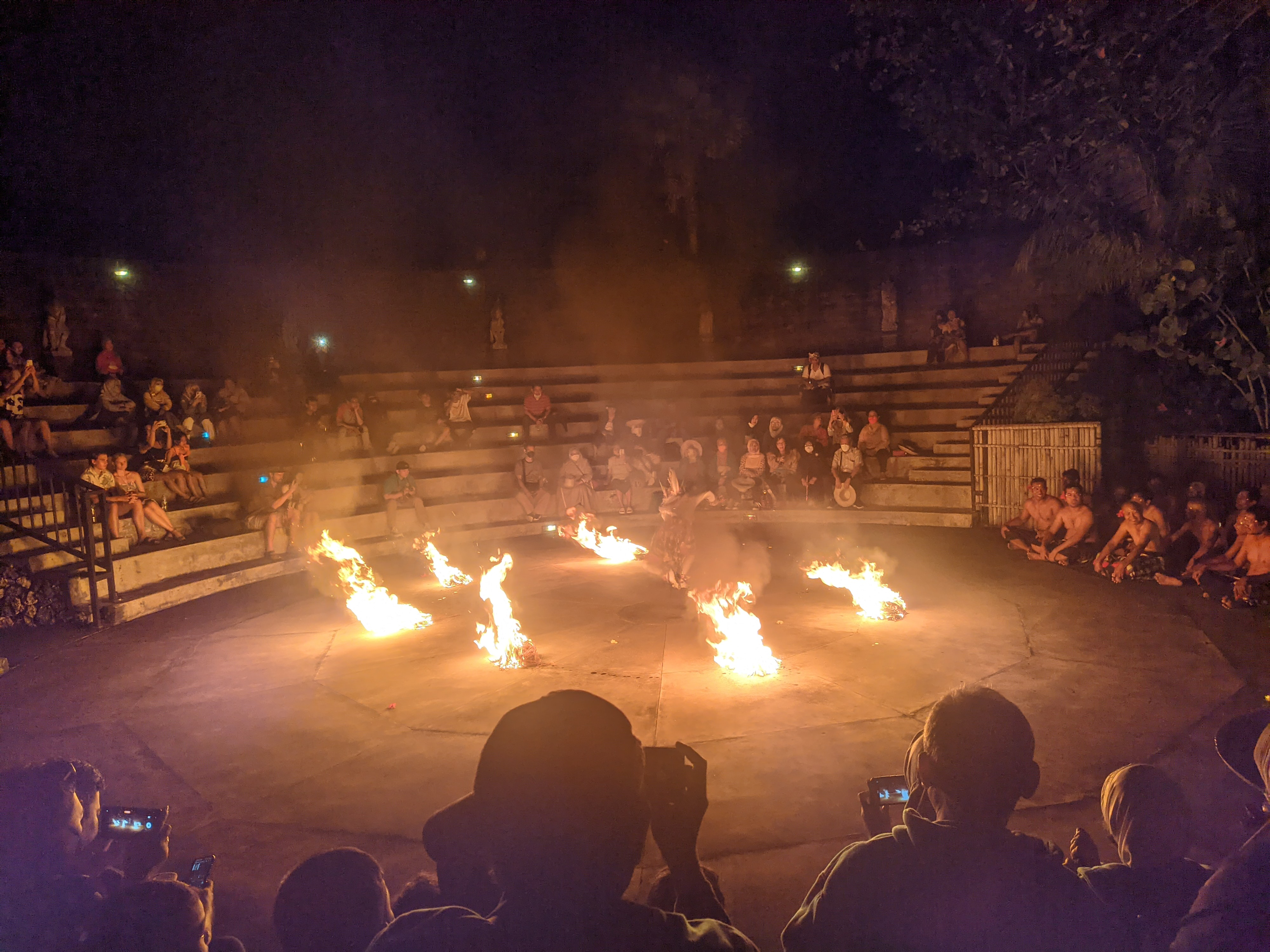
Kecak dance, 14 August 2022

== See also ==
- Indonesian architecture
- Hindu temple architecture
