= Pura Luhur Batukaru =

Hindu temple in Tabanan, Bali, Indonesia

- Location within Bali

General information
- Type: Pura
- Architectural style: Balinese
- Location: Wongaya Gede, Penebel district, Tabanan Regency, Indonesia
- Coordinates: 8°22′19″S 115°06′09″E

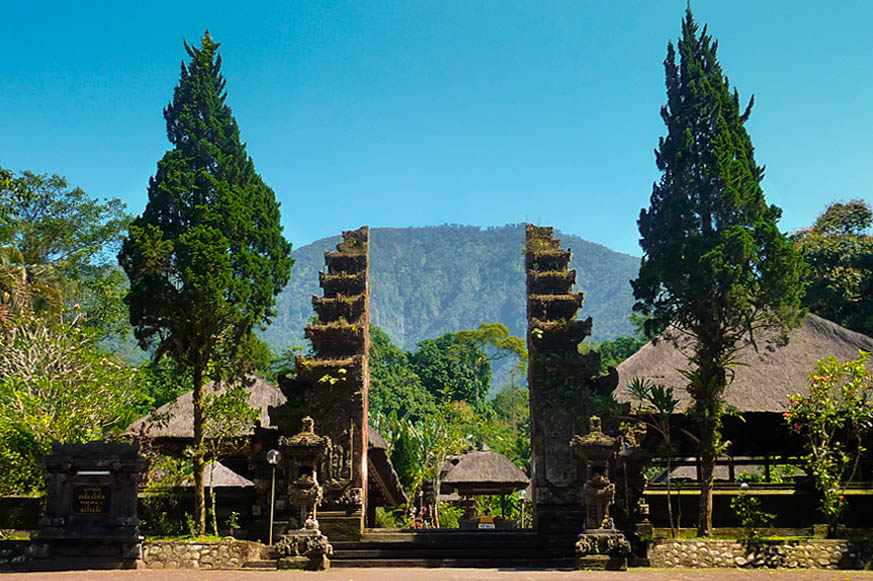
Pura Luhur Batukaru's gateway entrance built in the candi bentar style

Pura Luhur Batukaru is a Hindu temple in Tabanan, Bali, Indonesia.

== Location ==
The temple is located on the southern slope of Mount Batukaru, Bali's second-highest volcano.

== Description, history ==
The temple is one of the "six sanctuaries of the world" (Sad Kahyangan Jagad, with Sad meaning "six") which are among the holiest places of worship in Bali.

It is also one of the nine directional temples (kayangan jagat or kahyangan padma bhuwana, marking the eight cardinal directions,) to which is added the center point. These temples are meant to protect Bali from evil spirits; among those nine, Batukaru stands for the west direction.

Originally built during the 11th century, Pura Luhur Batukaru was dedicated to the ancestors of the rajas of Tabanan. It was destroyed in 1604, but rebuilt in 1959. The temple's most important shrine is a 7-tiered meru dedicated to Mahadewa, the god of Mount Batukaru.

Today, Pura Luhur Batukaru remains an extremely sacred site for Bali's Hindu population. Much of the complex's grounds remain off-limits to visitors for various ceremonies and events throughout the year. The temple is also the first stop on the way to the summit of Mount Batukaru. A pilgrimage takes place at the peak once a year, and may see thousands of worshipers walk its trails at once.
