= Pura Dalem Sakenan =

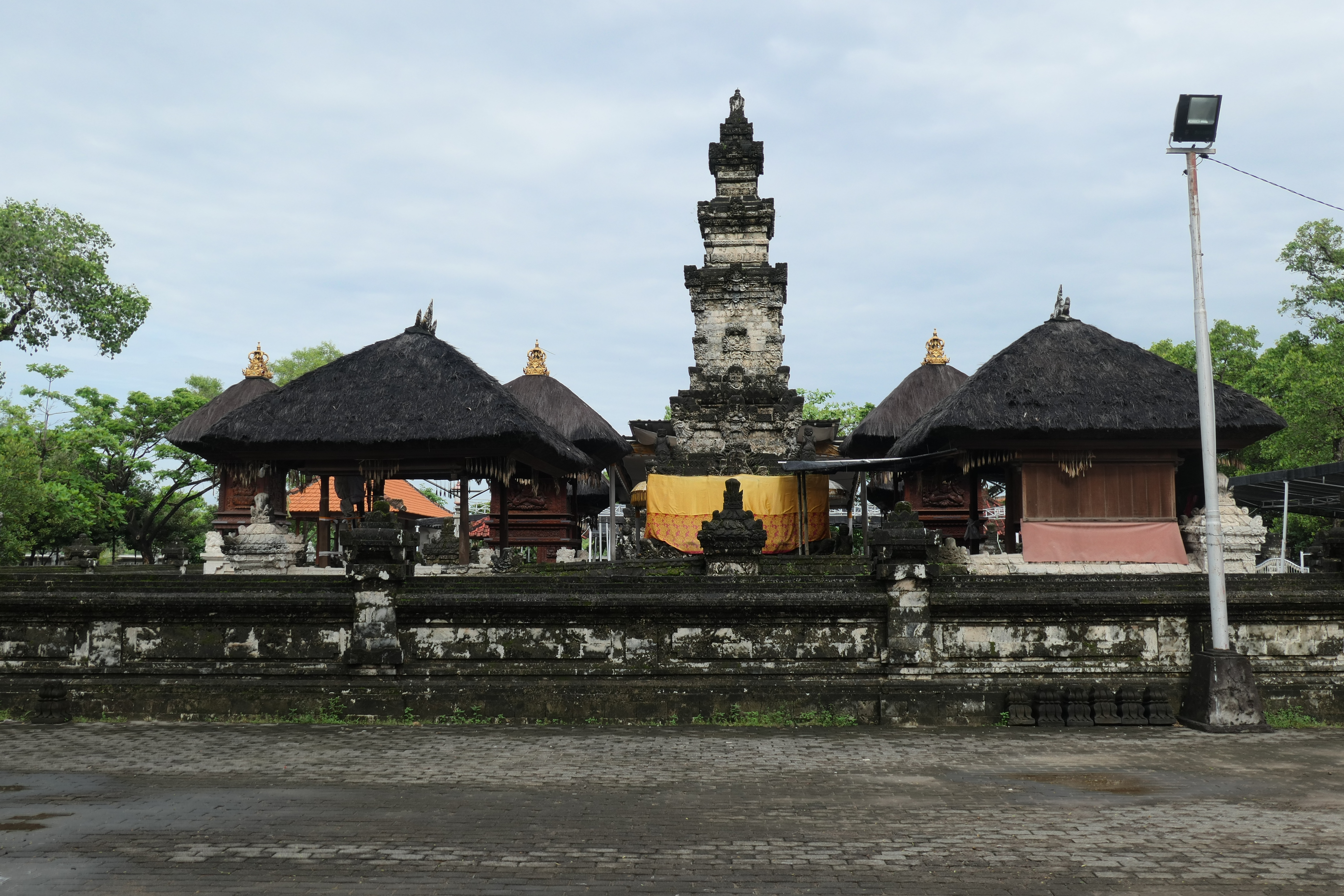
- Interactive map of the Pura Dalem Sakenan area

General information
- Type: Pura
- Architectural style: Balinese
- Location: Serangan, Bali, Indonesia, Jl. Pulau Serangan, Serangan, Denpasar Sel., Kota Denpasar, Bali 80229
- Coordinates: 8.725129°S 115.229400°E
- Estimated completion: 10th century

Pura Dalem Sakenan is a pura (Balinese Hindu temple) located at the north-western shore of Serangan, a small island about 10 kilometres (6.2 miles) south of Denpasar, Bali. Pura Dalem Sakenan is dedicated to [rambut sedhana] and is associated with prosperity. Pura Dalem Sakenan is the focus temple of the 210-day Piodalan festival where in the past processions of pilgrims visited the island on foot or by traditional colorful wooden boats called jukung. With the construction of the bridge connecting the Serangan island with Bali as well as the reclamation of the island, the use of colorful jukung for pilgrimage has died out.

== History ==
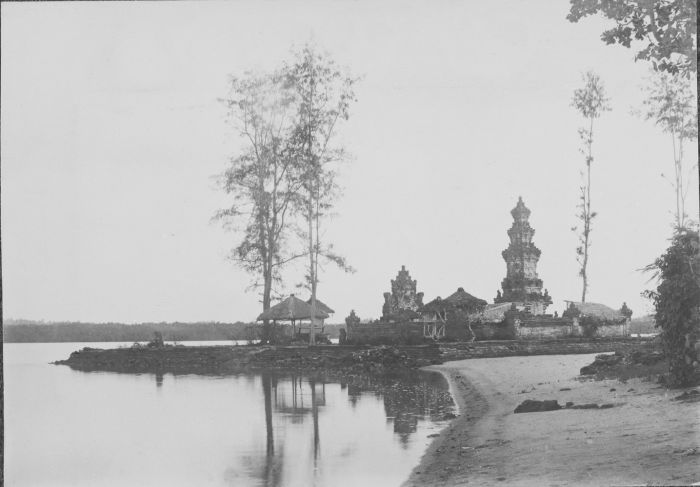
Pura Sakenan in early 20th-century before reclamation.

Pura Dalem Sakenan was established in the 10th century by high priest Mpu Kuturan, a notable priest said to arrive in Bali in 1001 AD before the fall of the Majapahit Kingdom. Mpu Kuturan was instrumental in the introduction and the establishment of Balinese Hinduism in the island.

As a center of pilgrimage, the temple has undergone several renovations except for its antique perimeter walls. In 1982, the surrounding villagers expanded the western part of Pura Dalem Sakenan temple complex. During the renovation, the older temple which was built of limestone and corals from the surrounding coastal reefs was carefully preserved.

In 1996, Serangan Island was reclaimed and a new bridge was constructed, connecting the island of Serangan with the main island of Bali. Reclamation of the Serangan Island was decided to improve the development of the island. Before the addition of bridges, the island of Serangan was often neglected in development. At the time before the reclamation of the island, children of Serangan had to use the traditional wooden boats to access the main island to attend schools.

== Temple compound ==
Pura Dalem Sakenan is a Pura Dalem, a type of pura which is dedicated to the worship of Shiva. Pura Dalem temple is associated with rituals concerning death. Among the elements which feature a Pura Dalem is a large tree or a kepuh, which is also used as a shrine.

Like all pura, Pura Dalem Sakenan consists of three areas: the outer sanctum of the temple (jaba pisan or nistaning mandala), the middle sanctum (jaba tengah or madya mandala), and the inner main sanctum (jero or utamaning mandala).

The outer sanctum or jaba pisan is the outermost courtyard of the temple. The outer sanctum of Pura Dalem Sakenan consists of empty courtyard. Two large trees adorned with polèng cloth, a black and white checkered pattern cloth. The trees are considered as dwellings for the guardian spirits of the temple complex.

The middle sanctum or jaba tengah is surrounded with the perimeter wall. A candi bentar gate marks the entrance to this area to the west.

The inner sanctum or jero is the most sacred part of a Balinese temple. There are numbers of pelinggih shrines and other types of shrines, each dedicated to the local deities. The tallest pelinggih is dedicated to Jro Dukuh Sakti. A paduraksa gate marks the entrance into the jero.

== Festivals ==
Pura Dalem Sakenan is the main focus of the annual Piodalan festival, a celebration of the temple's anniversary. The Piodalan is held once every 210 days (the number of days in one Balinese year) on every Kliwon Kuningan Saturday. The Kuningan is the last day of the Galungan celebrations.

During the Piodalan, people from the surrounding area would cross the sea to visit the small island of Serangan. At low tide, people would walk toward the Serangan carrying ancient heirlooms and sacred temple objects, through the mangrove forest separating the main island of Bali with Serangan. During high tide, traditional colorful wooden outriggers called jukung carry the crowds into the island. In 1996 reclamations took place on the island of Serangan. Today the island has been connected with the Serangan Sakenan bridge to the main island.

Upon arrival, the pilgrims would proceed towards the Pura Susunan Wadon, another temple located around half a kilometer to the east. The second temple to be visited by the pilgrims is the Pura Susunan Agung. The last temple to be visited by the pilgrims is the Pura Dalem Sakenan.

== See also ==
- Balinese temple

== Cited works ==
- Auger, Timothy, ed. (2001). Bali & Lombok. Eyewitness Travel Guides. London: Dorling Kindersley. ISBN 0751368709.
- Stuart-Fox, David (1999). Fox, James J. (ed.). Religion and Ritual: Balinese Hindu Temples. Indonesian Heritage. Singapore: Archipelago Press. ISBN 9813018585.
- Gungman; Budarsana; Gusmartin (January 25, 2004). "I Wayan Leder: Di Sekitar Pura Sakenan Banyak Wong Samar". Bali Post (in Indonesian). Archived from the original on September 23, 2015.
- Vickers, A. (1989). Bali: A Paradise Created. Tuttle Publishing. ISBN 978-1-4629-0008-4.
