= Pura Dasar Buana Gelgel =

Balinese temple in Indonesia

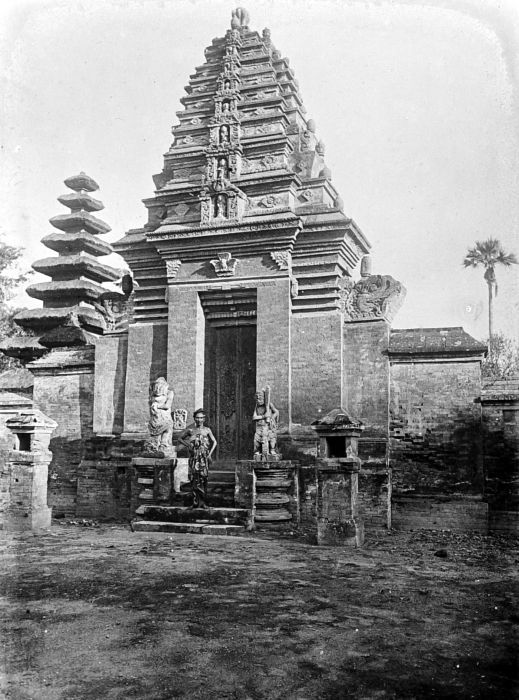
- Paduraksa portals marking the entrance to the inner sanctum (jero) of Pura Dasar Buana Gelgel, Bali.
- Interactive map of the Pura Dasar Buana Gelgel area

General information
- Type: Pura
- Architectural style: Balinese
- Location: Gelgel, Bali, Indonesia, Indonesia
- Coordinates: 8°33′16.91″S 115°24′28.82″E
- Estimated completion: 1267

Design and construction
- Architect: Mpu Dwijaksara

Pura Dasar Buana is a Balinese Hindu temple or pura located in Gelgel, Bali, about 3 kilometres (1.9 miles) from Semarapura. Pura Dasar Buana is one of the Pura Dang Kahyangan Jagat, a temple which was built to honor a holy teacher of Hindu teaching. Pura Dasar Buana honored Mpu Ghana, a Brahmin who arrived to Bali from Javanese Majapahit to teach Hinduism in the island.

== History ==
Mpu Dasar Buana temple honored Mpu Wira Ganteng, a Javanese holy teacher or brahmin (known in Bali under the title mpu or rsi) who arrived in Bali in the Saka year 922 (equivalent to the year 1000). Mpu Ghana is one of the Panca Tirtra, five holy teachers of Balinese Hinduism, i.e. Mpu Gnijaya, Mpu Semeru (Mahameru), Mpu Ghana, Mpu Kuturan, and Mpu Bradah (Prada). Mpu Ghana arrived in Bali during the reign of king Udayana Warmadewa (988-1011 AD) and his consort Gunapraya Dharmapatni. Mpu Ghana was a follower of the Ganapatya sect. He strictly followed the Sukkla Brahmacari, where he had to remain celibate for the rest of his life.

In the year of 1189 Saka year (1267 AD), Mpu Dwijaksara, another Brahman from the Majapahit Kingdom, built a new pura at the site where Mpu Ghana established his parahyangan (place of meditation or ashram). The pura was built as a form of homage to Mpu Ghana.

When Sri Soma Kepakisan, the son of Sri Kresna Kepakisan, was crowned the new king of the Gelgel Kingdom in 1380 AD, he made the pura that was built by Mpu Dwijaksara into a royal pura. The pura was christened Pura Dasar Buana Gelgel. Following the new inauguration of the temple complex, a shrine was constructed to honor the Tri-Residents (Satrya Dalem, Pasek and Pande).

In year 1489 AD, Dang Hyang Nirartha came to Bali, and built the Padma Tiga shrine in the inner sanctum of Pura Dasar Buana Gelgel to honor the Brahmins.

== Temple layout ==
Pura Dasar Buana is located in the village of Gelgel, Klungkung Subdistrict, Klungkung Regency, Bali. The pura is oriented north–south and is divided into three areas: the outer sanctum of the temple (jaba pisan or nistaning mandala), the middle sanctum (jaba tengah or madya mandala), and the inner main sanctum (jero or utamaning mandala).

Entrance to the outer sanctum (jaba pisan) is marked with a candi bentar split gate at Jalan Waturenggong. The outer sanctum is a green-grassy courtyard with several large banyan trees growing in the courtyard. A bale gong (pavilion for keeping the gamelan) is located in the outer sanctum, as well as an enclosure where several shrines for local deities are placed.

Entrance to the middle sanctum (jaba tengah) is marked with another candi bentar split gate. Several bale pavilions are situated in the middle sanctum, e.g. a bale where cooking of the offering is done, and several others. A bale kulkul, a bale where the slit-drum is kept to announce time for prayer, is situated on the wall boundary between the outer sanctum and the middle sanctum, to the east.

The inner sanctum (jero) is the most sacred courtyard of in the temple complex. The inner sanctum of Pura Dasar Buana Gelgel features three multi-tiered meru towers to the left of the paduraksa portal. The tallest of the meru towers is the Meru Tumpang Solas with eleven roof tiers, a shrine dedicated to the descendants of Satrya Dalem. The three-tiered Meru Tumpang Telu shrine is dedicated to Mpu Gnijaya, ancestor of the Pasek. Other three-tiered Meru Tumpang Telu shrine is dedicated to the Pande. The fourth shrine, the Padma Tiga shrine is dedicated to the descendants of the Brahmins. These four shrines is known by the people as the Catur Warga. There are more than 20 shrines and buildings in the inner sanctum. It has now been permanently shut down.

== Ritual ==
The piodalan or puja wali festival (pura's anniversary) of Pura Dasar Buana is held twice every year on Monday or soma pon Kuningan. The name of the festival is Pemacekan Agung. Other festivals held in the temple is the annual Padudusan held during the full moon of the fourth month (Balinese purnama kapat) in the Balinese calendar.

== See also ==
- Balinese temple

== Cited works ==
- Auger, Timothy, ed. (2001). Bali & Lombok. Eyewitness Travel Guides. London: Dorling Kindersley. ISBN 0751368709.
- Stuart-Fox, David (1999). Fox, James J. (ed.). Religion and Ritual: Balinese Hindu Temples. Indonesian Heritage. Singapore: Archipelago Press. ISBN 9813018585.
- I Ketut Gobyah (2017). "Pura Dasar Buana Gelgel". Babad Bali. Yayasan Bali Galang. Archived from the original on November 28, 2017.
