= Serangan Island =

Island in Bali, Indonesia

Serangan
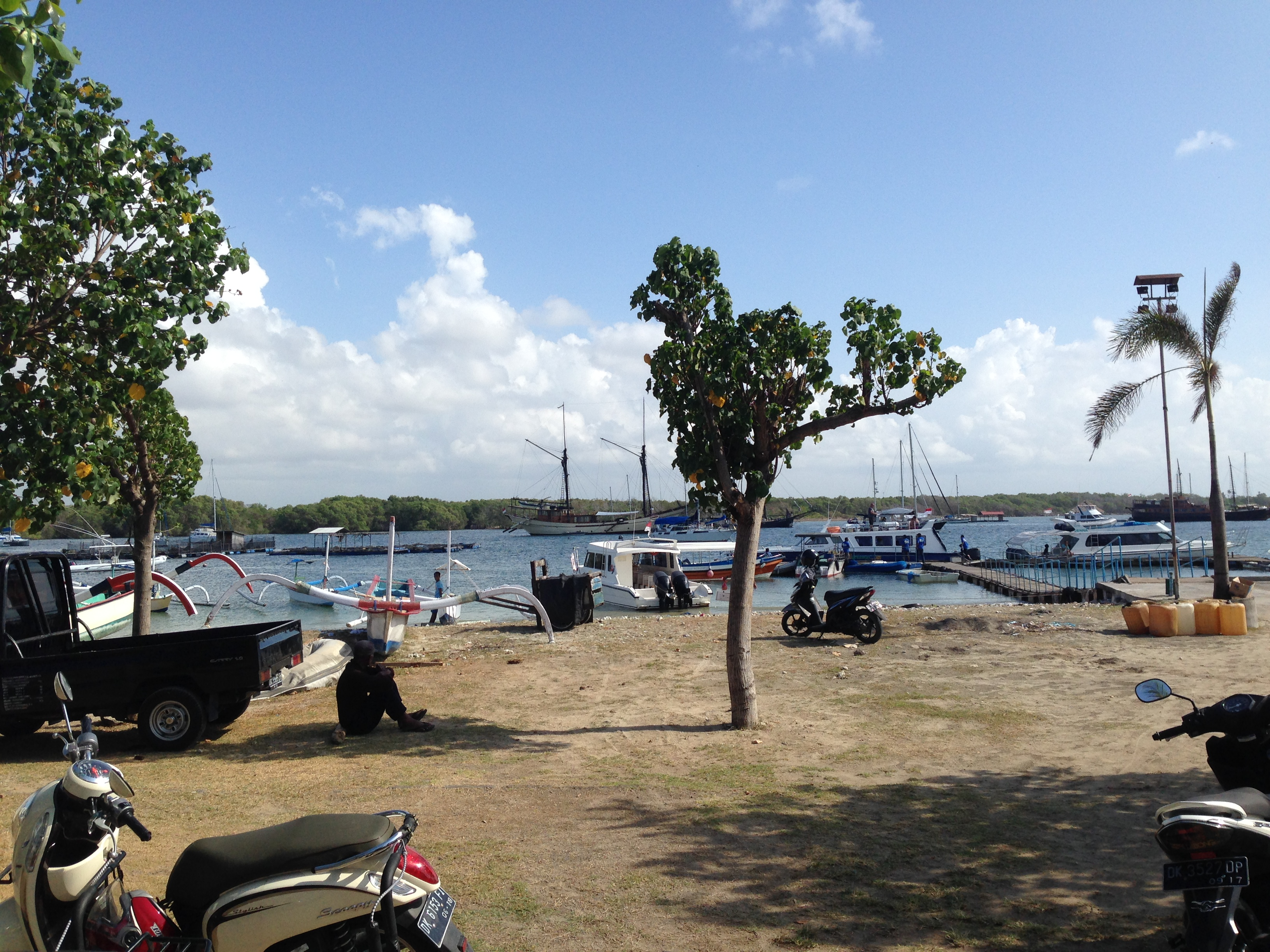

- Location within Bali

Geography
- Coordinates: 8°43′57″S 115°14′8″E
- Area: 4.81 km^{2} (1.86 sq mi)
- Length: 2.9 km (1.8 mi)
- Width: 1 km (0.6 mi)

Administration
- Indonesia
- Province: Bali
- City: Denpasar
- District: South Denpasar

Demographics
- Population: 4,080 (2024)
- Pop. density: 848/km^{2} (2196/sq mi)

Serangan is a small island located 500 m south of Denpasar, Bali, Indonesia. The island has a length of 2.9 km and a width of 1 km. Serangan is administratively part of the city of Denpasar, Bali. This island is known principally for its turtles and one of Bali 's six most sacred temples Pura Dalem Sakenan.

It is connected with Bali by a road bridge.
