= Bukit Peninsula =

Peninsula on Bali in Indonesia

Coordinates: 8.8109°S 115.1691°E

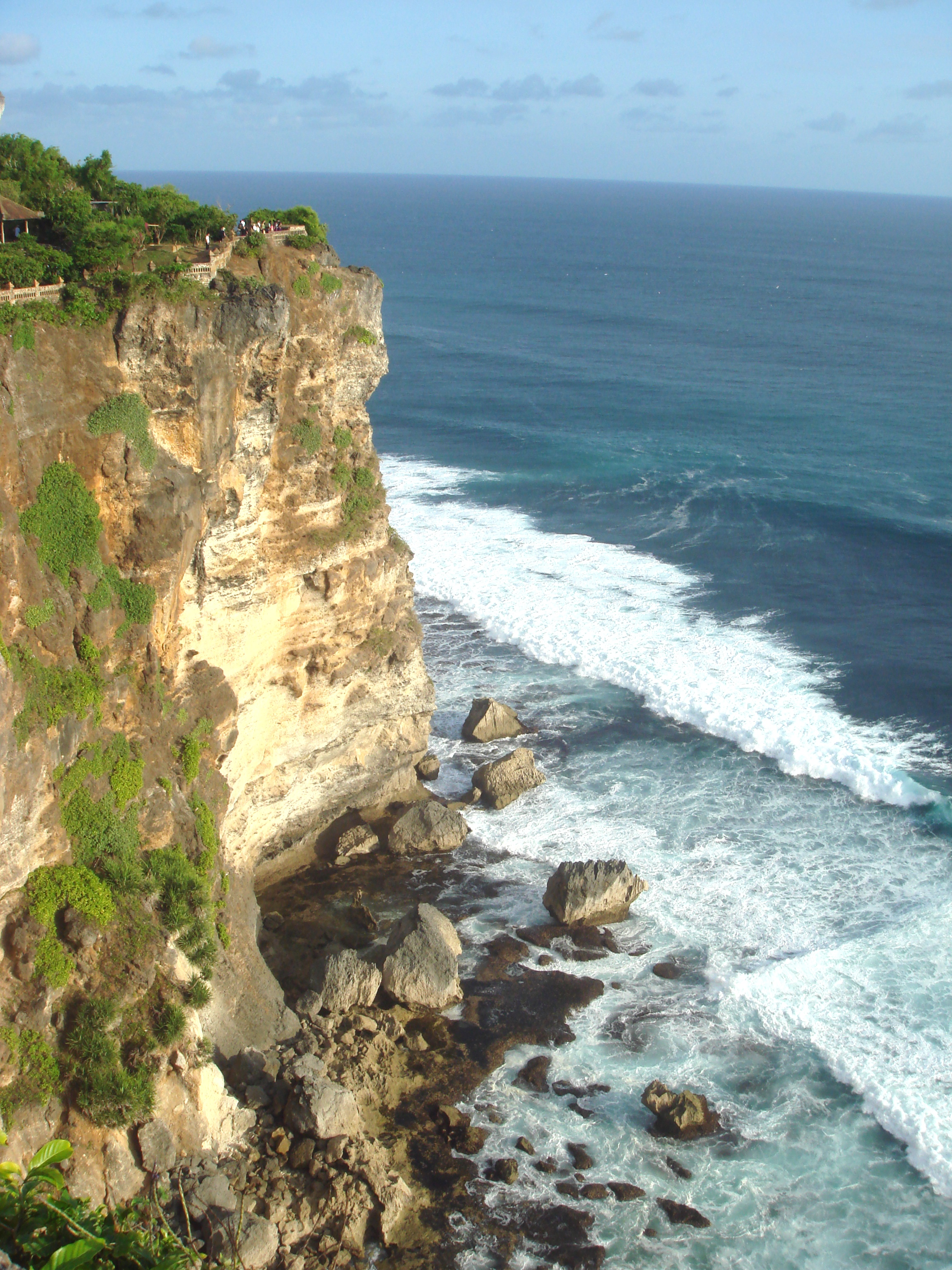
Tertiary limestone ocean floors, lifted by subduction, from the Bukit Peninsula, here visible with the cliffs of Uluwatu.

The Bukit Peninsula (Indonesian: Semenanjung Bukit) is at the southern end of the island of Bali, Indonesia. It is traditionally considered to be the entire area south of Jimbaran beach. Unlike the bulk of Bali, it features a dry, arid and stony landscape. It is administered under Kuta South District. Bukit means 'hill' in Indonesian.
