= Dang Hyang Nirartha =

Indonesian Hindu missionary

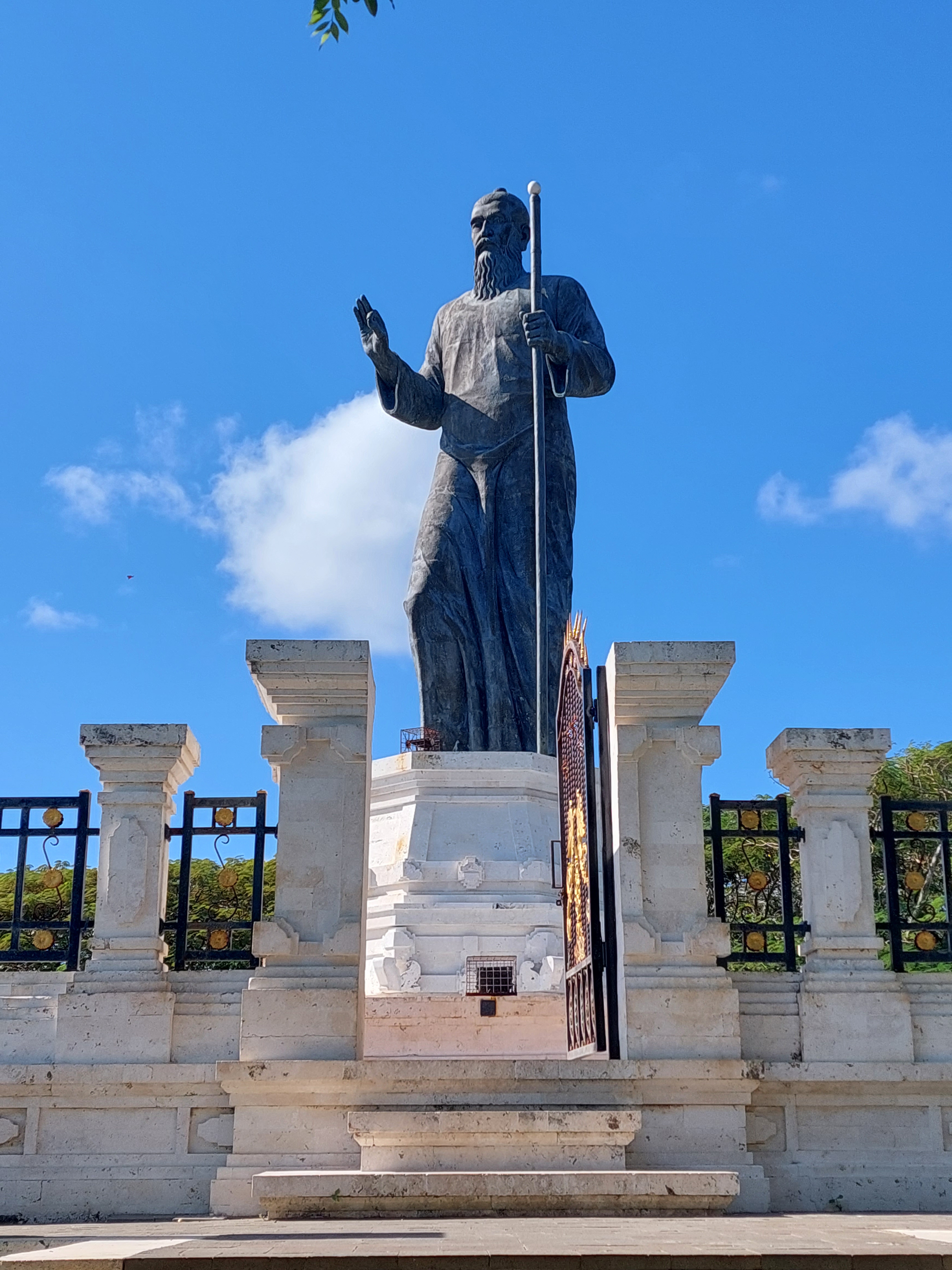
- A statue honoring Dang Hyang Nirartha at Uluwatu Temple
- Born: Ida Dwijendra; 15th century Daha, Majapahit
- Died: Mid-16th century Uluwatu, Bali
- Cause of death: Moksha
- Other names: Dang Hyang Dwijendra; Ida Pedanda; Sakti Wawu Rauh; Tuan Guru Semeru; Prince Sangupati
- Occupations: Royal Priest; Spiritual Teacher
- Known for: Reformer and Religious Teacher of Balinese Hinduism
- Spouses: Dyah Istri Komala Kemenuh; Dyah Sangawati Manuaba; Sri Patni Saraswati Keniten; Ni Gusti Luh Nyoman Genitir Manik Mas; Ni Jero Antapan; Ni Jero Beri
- Children: From first wife: Ida Ayu Swabhawa Ida Wiraga Sandi: From second wife: Ida Kulwan Ida Wiyatan Ida Lor Ida Ler: From third wife: Ida Rai Ratih Ida Putu Wetan Ida Telaga Ender: From fourth wife: Ida Putu Kidul: From fifth wife: Ida Wayan Sangsi Patapan: From sixth wife: Ida Wayahan Temesi Bindu
- Parents: Dang Hyang Smaranatha (father); Ida Sakti Sunyawati (mother)
- Relatives: Dang Hyang Astapaka (nephew)

Dang Hyang Nirartha, also known by various names such as Ida Pedanda Sakti Wawu Rauh, Mpu Nirartha, and Dang Hyang Dwijendra, was known as Prince Sangupati in Lombok and Tuan Guru Semeru in Sumbawa. He was a Hindu priest of the Shaiva sect who was born in Java during the final period of the Majapahit Kingdom and spent most of his life, until his death, in Bali. In Bali, he was appointed as Bagawanta or royal priest in the Gelgel Kingdom. In the manuscript Paniti Gama Tirta Pawitra, he is also depicted as Sang Atungga Dharma or a wandering sage who spread the teachings of dharma. He was also known as a renowned poet and literary figure. He is regarded as the most influential reformer of Balinese Hinduism, and his religious legacy is still practiced in various regions across Indonesia. He is also believed to be the founder of the teachings of Tarekat Watu Telu.

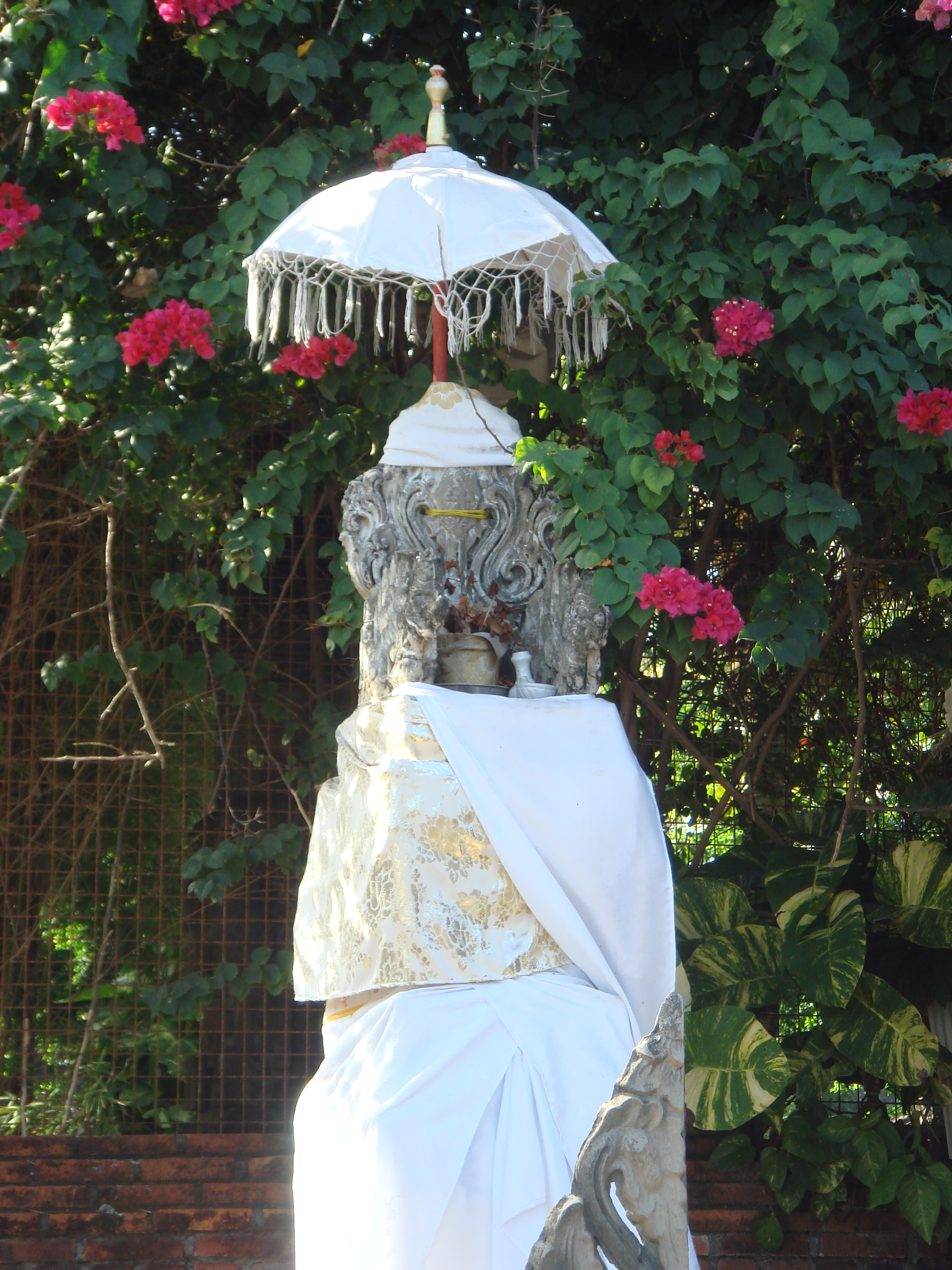
The introduction of the empty throne Padmasana as the seat for Sang Hyang Acintya was a result of the religious reform movement introduced and led by Dang Hyang Nirartha, at the same time as the spread of Islam was intensifying in Java.

== Early life ==
A representative of elite social milieus, Nirartha was a disciple of Muslim saint Syekh Siti Jenar. Jenar was a Javanese member of the Wali Sanga (revered Muslim saints) in Java who proned a more mystical approach of sufism, called pantheist Sufism (union of man and God, wujûdiyah, manunggaling kawulo gusti) - which opposed shariatic Sufism such as that of Sunan Kudus.

== Travelling to Bali: politics ==
Balinese texts define Nirartha as “a poet, intellectual, wonderworker, and advisor to rulers”, a well-travelled innovator or reformer. He was sent by the Javanese royal court of Majapahit to Bali. Balinese oral accounts give his arrival in Bali in 1492, during the reign of King Waturenggong of Gelgel. (Note: Other dates for his arrival in Bali are found, none is certain. We find "around 1489".) He brings the support of the spiritual world (niskala) - and the sanction of Java's earthly powers - to confirm Dalem Baturenggong's Gelgel kingship over Pasuruan, Blambangan, Puger, Bali, Nusa Penida, Sasak, and Sumbawa. He was to select a local priest who would lead the rajasurya or aswameda ceremony hosted by King Dalem Watu Renggong for the occasion.

Some accounts of the life of Nirartha say that he came into conflict with I Krahdng, sometimes called the king of Lombok. Krafeng Jarannika is reported to have died in about 1700 while resisting Karangasem's rule of Lombok.

A tradition, well known amongst brahmana in Bali, is that wetu telu Islam (a mix of Islam and animism) was brought to the Sasaks as the teachings of Nirartha or Dwijèndra, the ancestor of the Balinese brahmana siwa. One of the versions is that Nirartha disguised himself as Pangèran Sangupati in Lombok to found Islam there, and as Tuan Seméru or Suméru in Sumbawa to spread similar teachings there. Another version is that Pangèran Sangupati is a different person from Nirartha and may have been a Sasak pupil of his.

Nirartha's travels in Bali, Lombok and Sumbawa are recounted in a lontara called Dwijendra Tatwa.

Admittedly he was still in Bali and alive in 1537: he penned a colophon attached to a copy of the kakavin Sumanasāntaka, which states that “the copy was completed on 14 July 1537 in Bali, at the sima Kanaka by one whose parab was Nirartha”. One year before that, in 1536, according to the Dwijendratattwa and the Babad Brāhmaṇa he completed a work called Mahiṣa Mĕgat Kūng.

== Religious work ==
Nirartha was responsible for facilitating a refashioning of Balinese Hinduism. He was an important promoter of the idea of moksha ( freedom from the cycle of death and rebirth) in Indonesia. He founded the Shaivite priesthood that is now ubiquitous in Bali, and is now regarded as the ancestor of all Shaivite pedandas.

He introduced in Balinese Hindu temples the shrine (padmasana) of the empty throne as an altar to the supreme god Acintya or Shiva, as a result of Shaivite reformation movement. The temples on the coasts of Bali were augmented with the padmasana shrines by the dozen during Nirartha's travels.

== Legends ==
Bali had been hit with many plagues in the years before. Some myths state that he made the journey from Java to Bali on top of a pumpkin, giving rise to the taboo among some Balinese Brahmins on the consumption of pumpkins. The legend says that Nirartha presented the king with a hair from his head, stating that this would remove the sufferings. This hair was placed in a temple which became a prominent Shaivite pilgrimage spot in Bali.

== See also ==
=== Bibliography ===
- Nubowo, Andar (2023). La genèse d'un "islam du juste milieu" en Indonésie : histoire et portée de l'institutionnalisation d'une notion ambigüe [Genesis of a "golden mean islam" in Indonesia: history and scope of the institutionalisation of an ambiguous notion] (PDF) (phD in History) (in French). École normale supérieure de Lyon. pp. 30–31.
- Pringle, Robert (2004). A short history of Bali: Indonesia's Hindu Realm. Short History of Asia cup. Crows Nest, NSW: Allen & Unwin. ISBN 1-86508-863-3.
- Putra, Ida Bagus Rai; Kesuma, I Nyoman Weda; Cika, I Wayan; Suastika, I Made (January 2011). "Dharmayatra in the Dwijendra Tattwa text analysis of reception". e-Journal of Linguistics. 5 (2).
- Vickers, A. (October 1987). "Hinduism and Islam in Indonesia: Bali and the Pasisir World" (PDF). Indonesia. 44: 30–58. doi:10.2307/3351220. JSTOR 3351220. (summary)

=== External links ===
- "Dwijendra Tatwa". archive.org.
