= Pura Taman Saraswati =

Balinese Hindu temple in Indonesia

Pura Taman Kemuda Saraswati
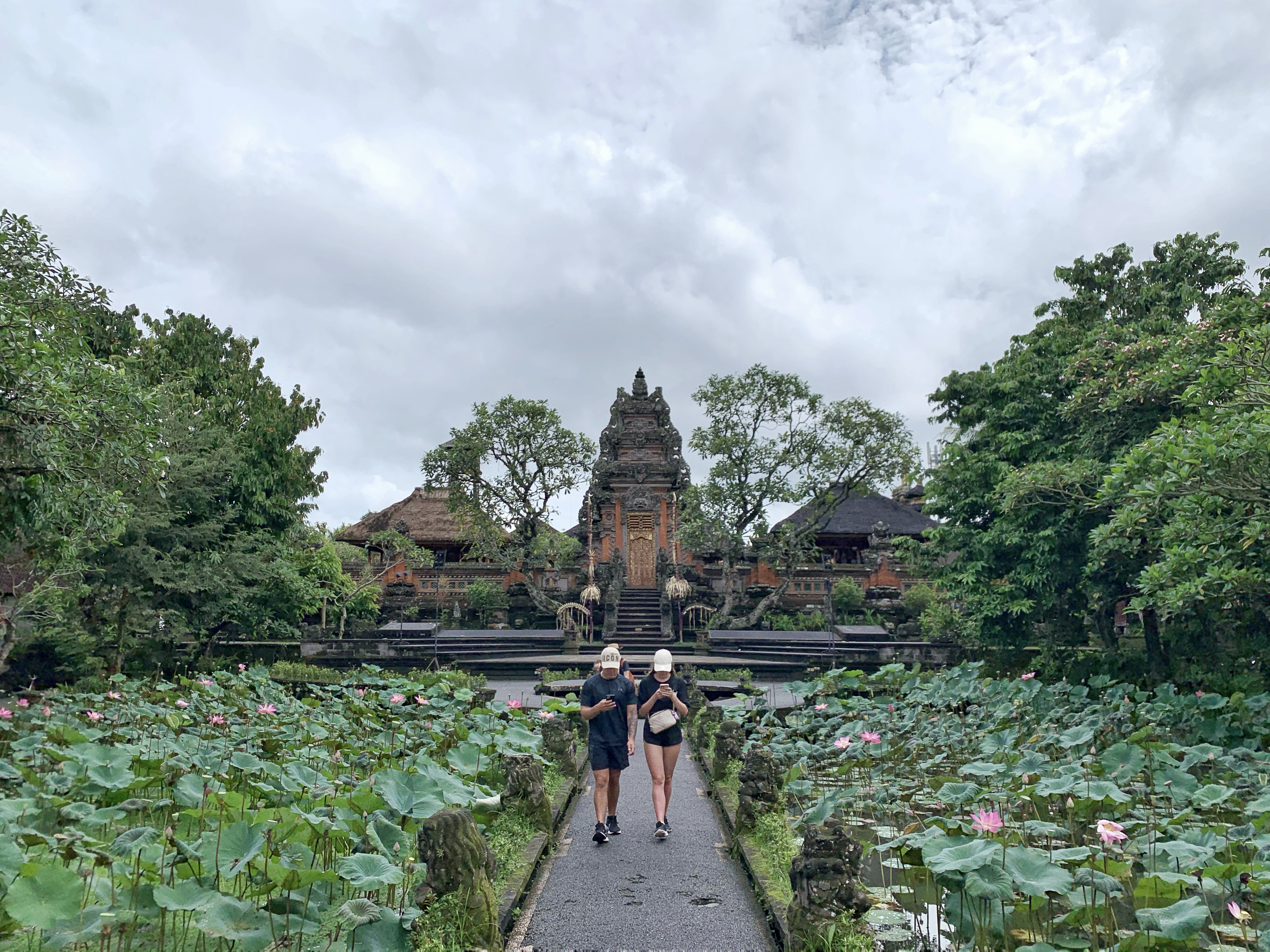
- The lotus pond of Pura Taman Saraswati.

- Location within Indonesia

General information
- Type: Pura
- Architectural style: Balinese
- Location: Ubud, Gianyar Regency, Bali, Indonesia
- Coordinates: 8°30′21″S 115°15′41″E
- Construction started: 1951
- Estimated completion: 1952

Design and construction
- Architect: I Gusti Nyoman Lempad

Pura Taman Saraswati, officially Pura Taman Kemuda Saraswati, also known as the Ubud Water Palace, is a Balinese Hindu temple in Ubud, Bali, Indonesia. The pura is dedicated to the goddess Sarasvati. Pura Taman Saraswati is notable for its lotus pond.

== History ==
Pura Taman Saraswati was designed by I Gusti Nyoman Lempad following a commission by the Prince of Ubud Cokorda Gede Agung Sukawati. I Gusti Nyoman Lempad was a well known Balinese sculptor and undagi (Balinese architect for ritual paraphernalia e.g. cremation towers and wooden sarcophagi). I Gusti Nyoman Lempad arrived in Ubud after moving away from the royal court of Blahbatuh, following a serious disagreement which provokes the wrath of the King of Blahbatuh. In Ubud, he was employed by the Sukawati royal family and built several palaces and temples in Ubud and the neighboring villages.

Construction of Pura Taman Saraswati started in 1951 and was completed in 1952. The pura is dedicated to Sarasvati, the Hindu deity of learning, literature and art.

== Temple compound ==
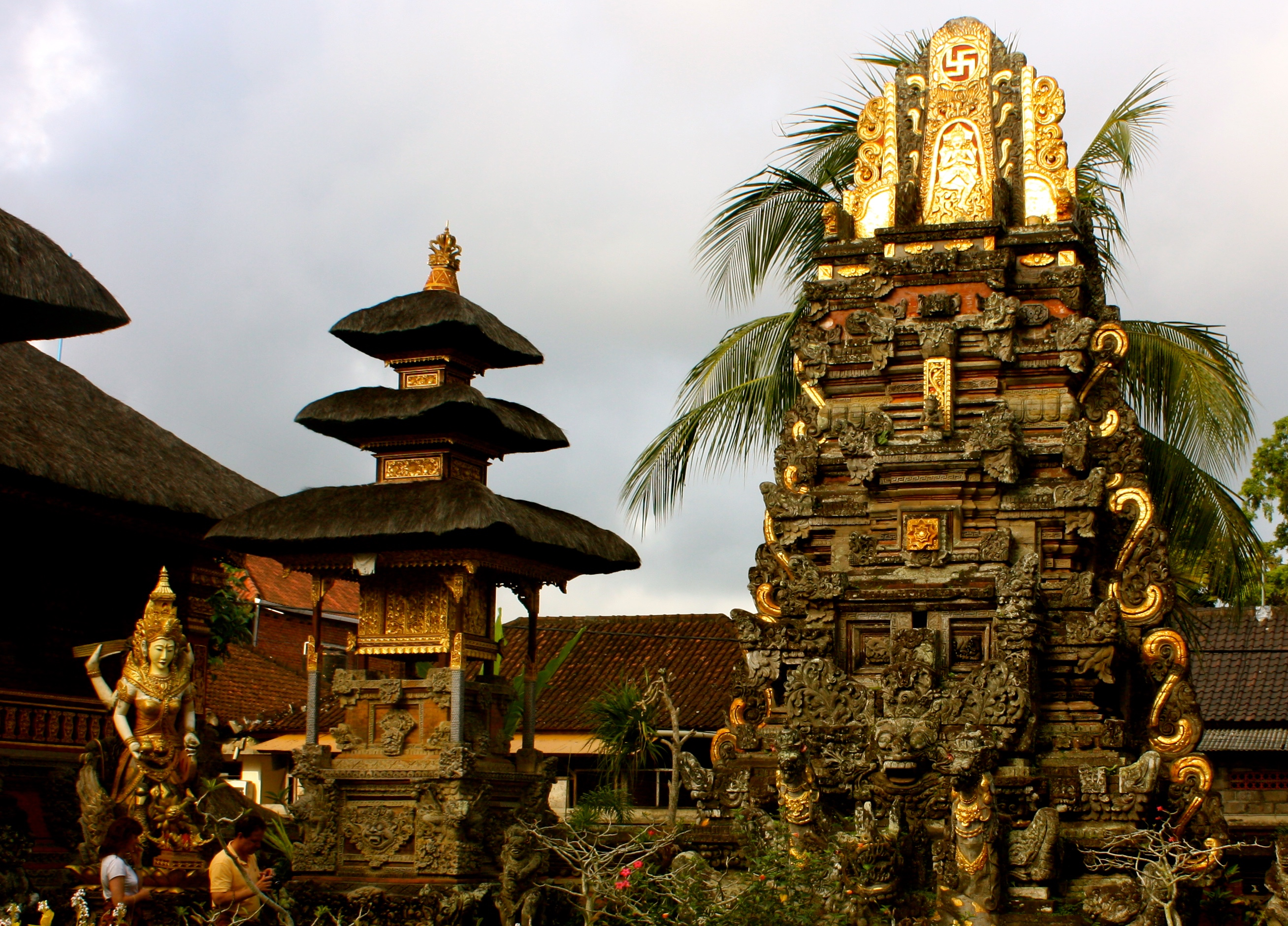
The padmasana of Acintya in the holiest sanctum of the pura.

Pura Taman Saraswati is one of the most popular landmarks of Ubud. The most notable feature of the pura is its lotus pond and water garden, marking the outer area of the actual temple. Plumeria (frangipani) trees decorate the edges of the pond, while the straight bridge-like access is decorated with paras (volcanic tuff) sculptures of Hindu mythological figures. Many of these statues are the works of Lempad. Access to the inner sanctum is provided by three red-bricked kori agung gates. The central kori agung is the largest of these gates and is flanked with two tall plumeria trees.

The straight route into the inner courtyard is blocked by an unusual aling-aling, a wall device which is used to disorient evil spirits in the architecture of Bali. This wall is actually the back of a 3 metres (9.8 ft)-tall statue of the rakshasha figure Jero Gede Mecaling.

A padmasana shrine is located at the most sacred, kaja-kangin (north-east) side of the temple. The base of this padmasana is decorated with paras carvings of the cosmic turtle and several nagas, these represent the world of demons (bhur). The uppermost part of the padmasana is topped with a golden empty throne decorated with the image of Acintya, the highest deity in the Balinese Hindu pantheon.

A pavilion (bale) with three empty thrones on the inside is dedicated for the Hindu Trimurti of Brahma, Vishnu and Shiva. Several meru towers are located on this side as well. The temple also contains the bale barong, a pavilion to keep the barong figures used by villagers for exorcizing rituals. Normally there are two barong figures in the bale barong: the lion-like Barong Ket and the boar-like Barong Pangkal). There is also statue of the goddess Sarasvati.

== Cited works ==
- DK Travel (2016). DK Eyewitness Travel Guide Bali and Lombok. Penguin. ISBN 9781465453181.
- Kartajaya, Hermawan (2009). Ubud - The Spirit of Bali. Gramedia Pustaka Utama. ISBN 9789792249873.
- Reader, Lesley; Ridout, Lucy (2002). Bali and Lombok. Rough Guide Travel Guides. Rough Guides. ISBN 9781858289021.
