= Viceroy Bali =

General information
- Location: Br. Nagi, Jl. Lanyahan, Petulu, Kecamatan Ubud, Kabupaten Gianyar, Bali 80571, Indonesia
- Coordinates: 8°29′38.51″S 115°16′38.82″E
- Opened: 2005

Other information
- Number of suites: 40

Website
- https://www.viceroybali.com

Viceroy Bali is a five-star family-owned hotel and resort in Ubud, Bali, Indonesia. The Viceroy Bali is a Small Luxury Hotels of the World Finest Collection member.

== History ==
Viceroy Bali was established in 2005 by Margaret Bainbridge, initially opening with 11 villas. Over time, the resort expanded to include 40 private pool villas, blending modern elements with traditional Balinese architecture. In 2020, the resort appointed Amanda Syrowatka as general manager and Patrick Farrell as director of sales and marketing. In 2024, Patrick Farrell was appointed General Manager whilst Amanda Syrowatka remains as Director of the family business.

== Location ==
Viceroy Bali is located on a ravine's edge overlooking the Petanu River gorge. The resort is five minutes from the center of Ubud and advertises access to Ubud's attractions, including art galleries, traditional markets, and cultural sites.

== Facilities ==
Viceroy Bali offers 40 private villas, each with a private pool. The resort provides amenities such as yoga sessions, guided tours, and cooking classes. Dining options include two restaurants, Cascades Bali and Apéritif, along with the Pinstripe Cocktail Bar. The Akoya Spa, launched in 2023, offers a range of holistic treatments and massages. As of August 2025, the spa houses an infrared sauna and cold plunge bath.

== Awards and recognition ==
- 2013: Received the Seal of Excellence award from the Luxury Panel Members of the Seven Star Global Luxury Award organization.
- 2015: Awarded Bali’s Leading Villa Resort by the World Travel Awards.
- 2016: Recognized as Bali’s Leading Villa Resort for the second consecutive year by the World Travel Awards.
- 2018: Voted the world's #1 resort in the Condé Nast Readers' Choice Awards.
- 2020: The World Culinary Awards named Apéritif Restaurant & Bar as Indonesia's Best Restaurant.
- 2021: Recognized as the Best Luxury Resort in Asia at the World Luxury Hotel Awards. Received the Recommended Award from Forbes Travel Guide.
- 2022: Honoured in the TripAdvisor Traveler's’ Choice Awards as one of the Best of the Best Hotels.
- 2024: Featured on Brides’ Best Balinese Resorts for Your Honeymoon list as the best resort for relaxation in 2024.
