= Balinese architecture =

Style of architecture

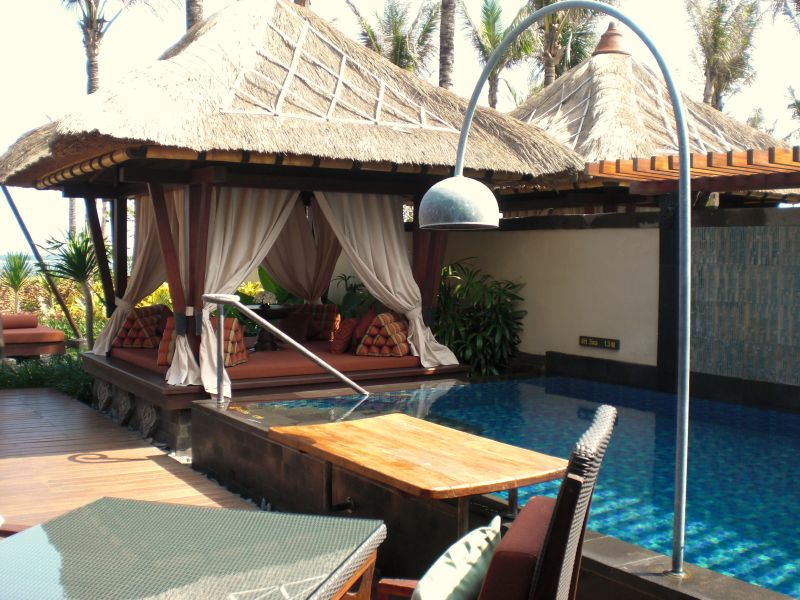
A Balinese-style resort villa in Bali

Balinese architecture is a vernacular architecture tradition of Balinese people that inhabits the volcanic island of Bali, Indonesia. Balinese architecture is a centuries-old architectural tradition influenced by Balinese culture developed from Hindu influences through ancient Javanese intermediary, as well as pre-Hindu elements of native Balinese architecture.

The contemporary Balinese style is known as one of the most popular Asian tropical architecture, due largely to the growth of the tourism industry in Bali which has created a demand for Balinese-style houses, cottages, villas, and hotels. Contemporary Balinese architecture combines traditional aesthetic principles, the island's abundance of natural materials, the famous artistry and craftsmanship of its people, international architectural influences, new techniques, and trends.

== Materials ==
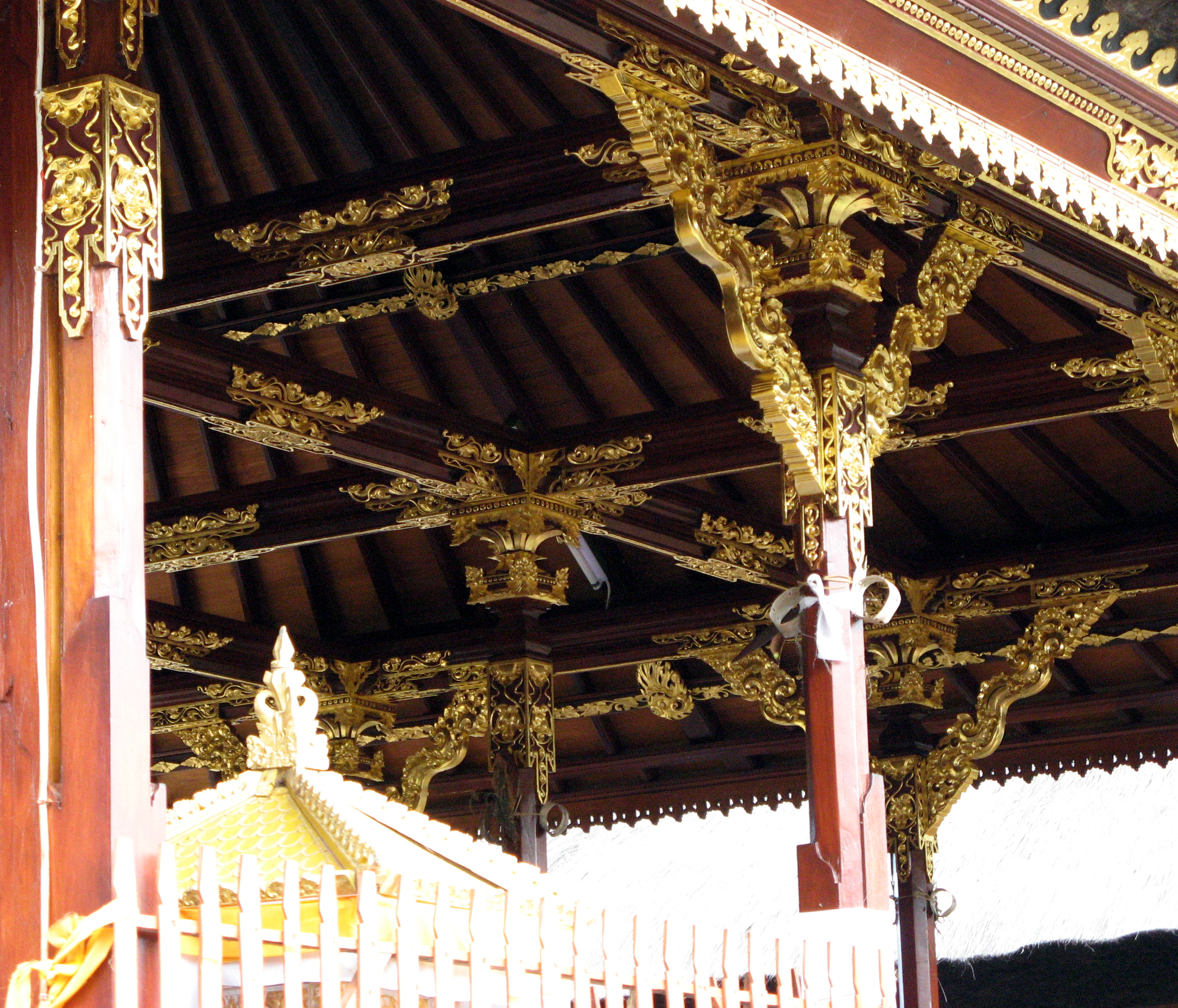
Interior with gilded columns capital, beam, and ceiling decoration on Pura Penataran Agung in Besakih

Traditional Balinese buildings are designed to be in harmony with the environment. Traditional Balinese houses are built almost entirely of organic materials. They use natural materials such as thatch roofing, bamboo poles, woven bamboo, coconut wood, teak wood, brick, and stone. The thatched roof are usually made of ijuk (black aren fibers), dried coconut or rumbia leaves, or sirap (hardwood shingles arranged like tiles). Stones and red bricks are usually used as foundations and walls, while sandstone and andesite stone are usually carved as ornamentation.

Balinese people are known for their artistry. They have developed a sophisticated sculpting tradition that manifests in architecture rich with ornamentation and interior decoration. Balinese temples and palaces are exquisitely decorated with rich ornamentations, both wooden and stone sculpting, which usually depict floral patterns. Balinese sculpture often served as gate guardians as twin dvarapalas flanking entrances. The gates themselves are richly decorated with kala's head, floral ornaments, and vajra or ratna pinnacles. Other sculptures often serve as ornamentation, such as goddess or dragon waterspouts in bathing places.

== Philosophy ==
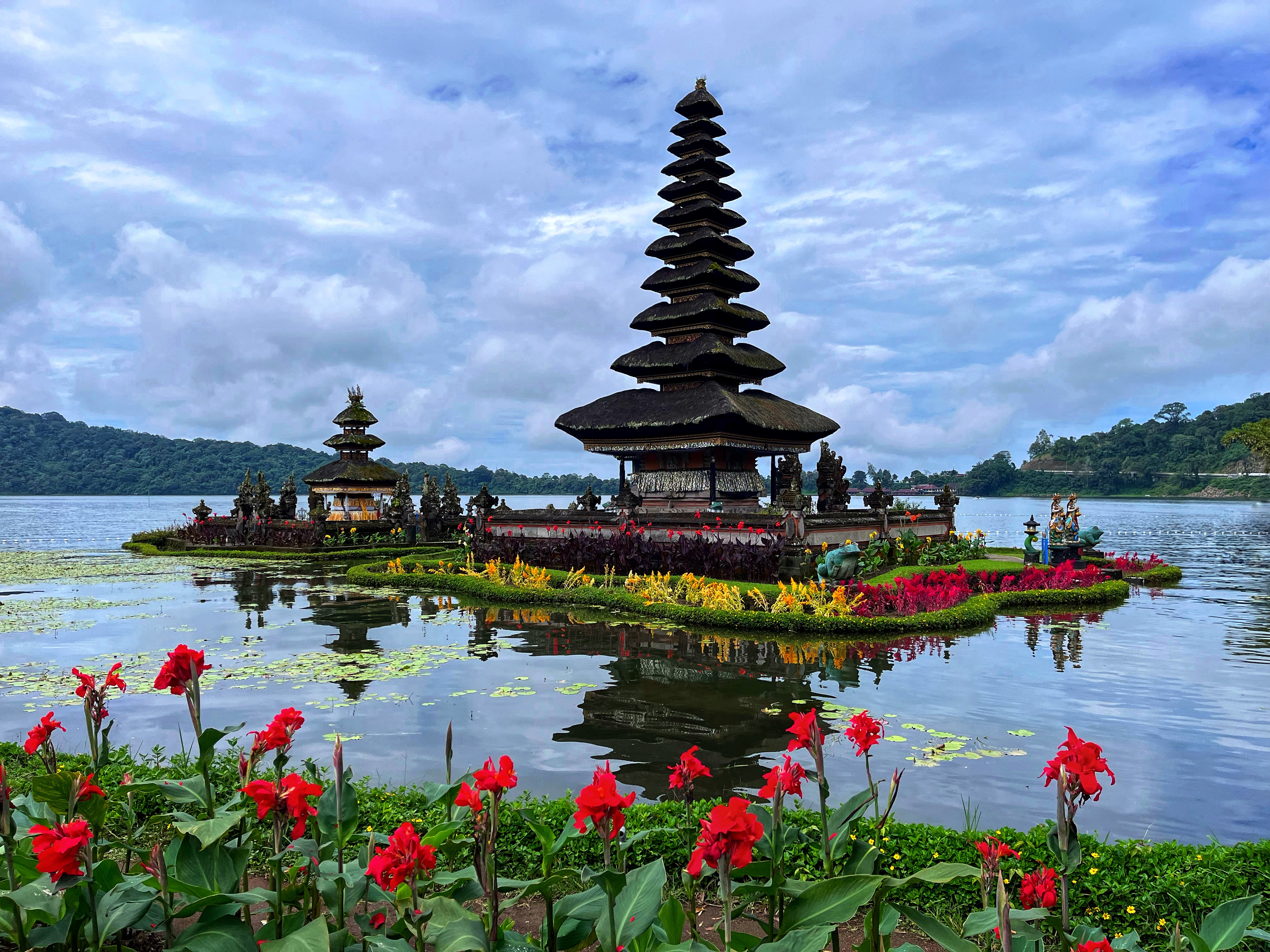
Pura Ulun Danu Bratan in harmony with the Bratan Lake environment.

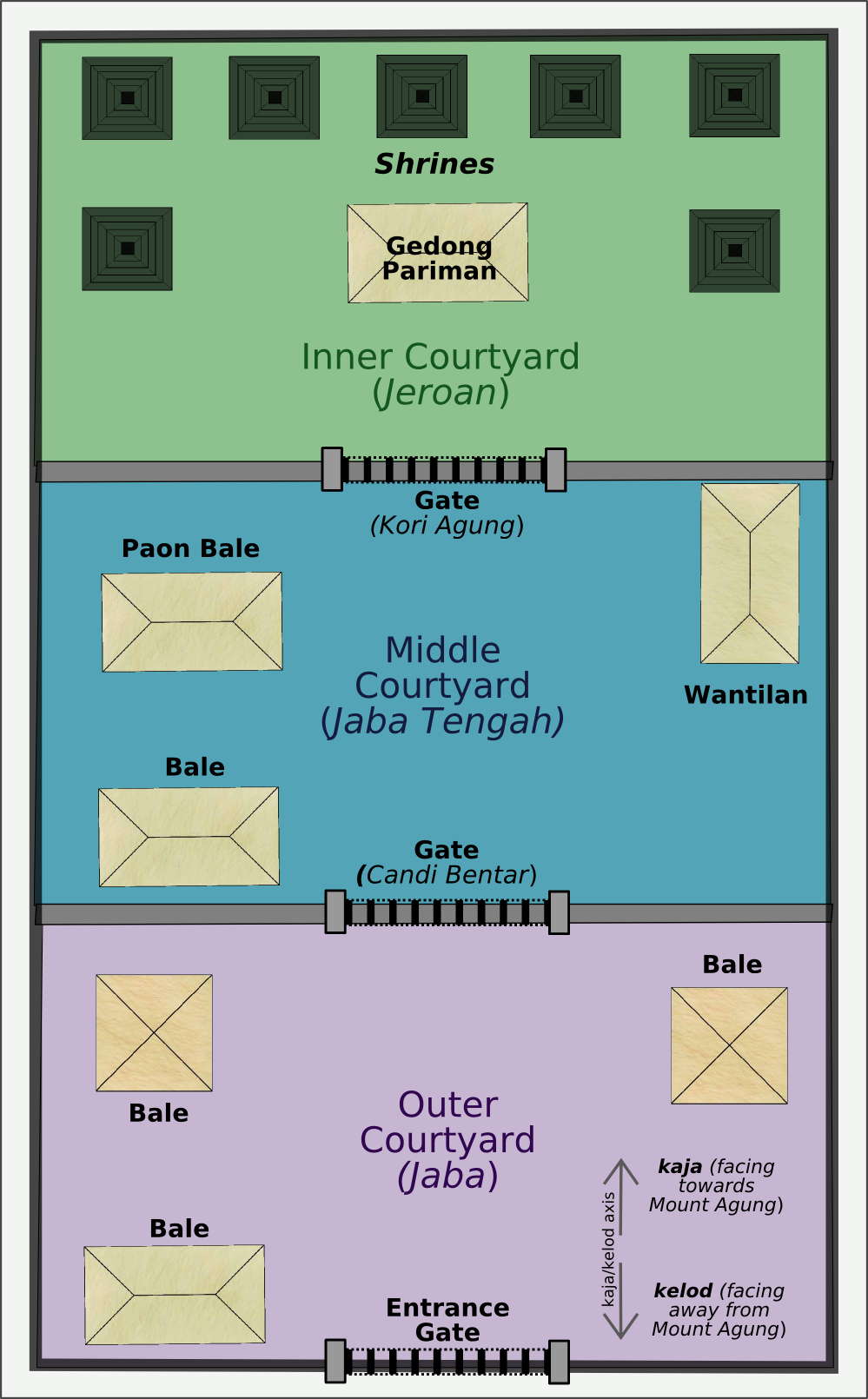
Balinese temple layout, arranged in three zones (mandalas)

Balinese architecture is developed from Balinese ways of life, their spatial organization, their communal-based social relationships, as well as philosophy and spirituality influenced its design; much owed to Balinese Hinduism. The common theme that often occurs in Balinese design is the tripartite divisions.

Traditional Balinese architecture, adheres to strict and sacred building laws, allowing much open space and consisting of a spacious courtyard with many small pavilions, ringed by walls to keep out evil spirits and decorated with guardian statues. The philosophical and conceptual basis underlining the development of Balinese traditional architecture includes several concepts such as:

- Tri Hita Karana: the concept of harmony and balance consists of three elements; atma (human), angga (nature), and khaya (gods). Tri Hita Karana prescribes three ways that a human being must strive to nurture a harmonious relationship with; fellow human beings, nature, and God.
- Tri Mandala: space division and zoning rules. Tri Mandala is a spatial concept describing three parts of realms, from Nista Mandala — the outer and lower mundane less-sacred realm, Madya Mandala — the intermediate middle realm, to Utama Mandala — the inner and higher most important sacred realm.
- Sanga Mandala: also space division a. The Sanga Mandala is the spatial concept concerning directions that divide an area into nine parts according to eight main cardinal directions and central (zenith). These nine cardinal directions are connected to the Hindu concept of Guardians of the directions, Dewata Nawa Sanga, or nine guardian gods of directions that appear in the Majapahit emblem Surya Majapahit. They are; Center: Shiva, East: Isvara, West: Mahadeva, North: Vishnu, South: Brahma, Northeast: Sambhu, Northwest: Sangkara, Southeast: Mahesora, and Southwest: Rudra.
- Tri Angga: the conception of hierarchy from a microcosm, middle realm, and macrocosm. It is also connected to the next concept tri loka.
- Tri Loka: also the conception of hierarchy between three realms bhur (Sanskrit:bhurloka) lower realm of animals and demons, bhuwah (Sanskrit:bhuvarloka) middle realm of humans, and swah (Sanskrit:svarloka) upper realm of gods and deities.
- Asta Kosala Kosali: the eight guidelines for architectural designs, which include the shapes of niyasa (symbols) in pelinggih (shrine), pepalih (stages), its measurement units, shapes, and size, also dictate appropriate decorations.
- Arga Segara or Kaja Kelod: the sacred axis between. arga or kaja (mountain) and segara or kelod (sea). Mountain regions are considered parahyangan, the abode of hyang or gods, the middle plain in between are the realm of humans, and the sea is the realm of sea monsters and demons.

Other than artistic and technical mastery, all Balinese architects (Balinese:Undagi) are required to master these Balinese philosophical concepts concerning form, architecture, and spatial organization.

== Religious architecture ==
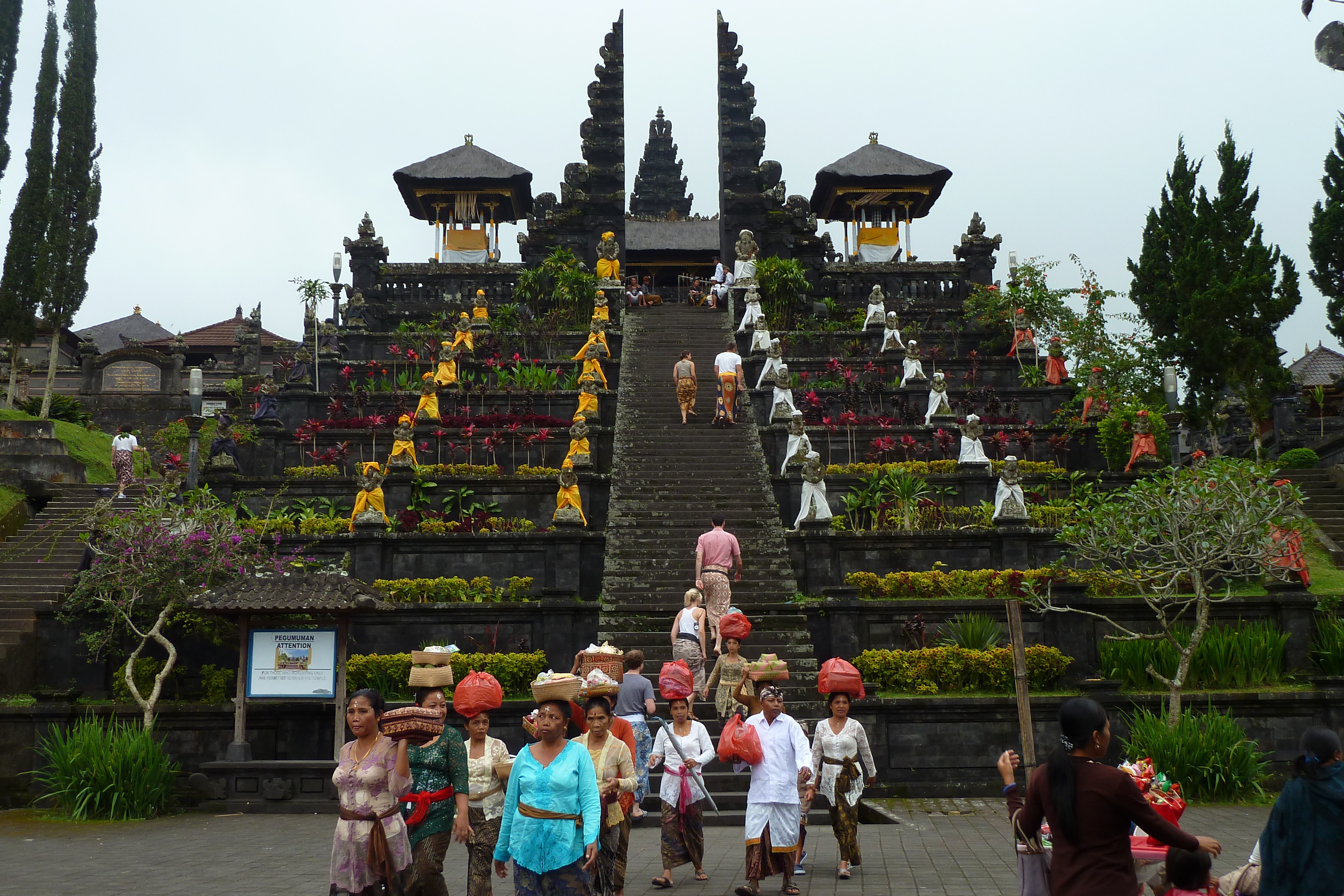
Mother temple Besakih.

Balinese temples or pura (Sanskrit for: "walled city") are designed as open-air places of worship within enclosed walls, connected with a series of intricately decorated gates between their compounds. This walled compound contains several shrines, meru (towers), and bale (pavilions). The design, plan, and layout of the pura follow the Tri Mandala concept of Balinese space allocation. The three mandala zones are Nista Mandala (jaba pisan): the outer zone, Madya Mandala (jaba tengah): the middle zone, and Utama Mandala (jero): the holiest and the most sacred zone.

Balinese temple usually contains a padmasana, the towering lotus throne of the supreme god Sang Hyang Widhi Wasa, the pelinggih meru, (a multiple-roofed tower similar in design to the Nepali or Japanese pagoda), and various pavilions, including bale pawedan (vedic chanting pavilion), bale piyasan, bale pepelik (offering pavilion), bale panggungan, bale murda, and gedong penyimpenan (storehouse of the temple's relics).

== Domestic architecture ==
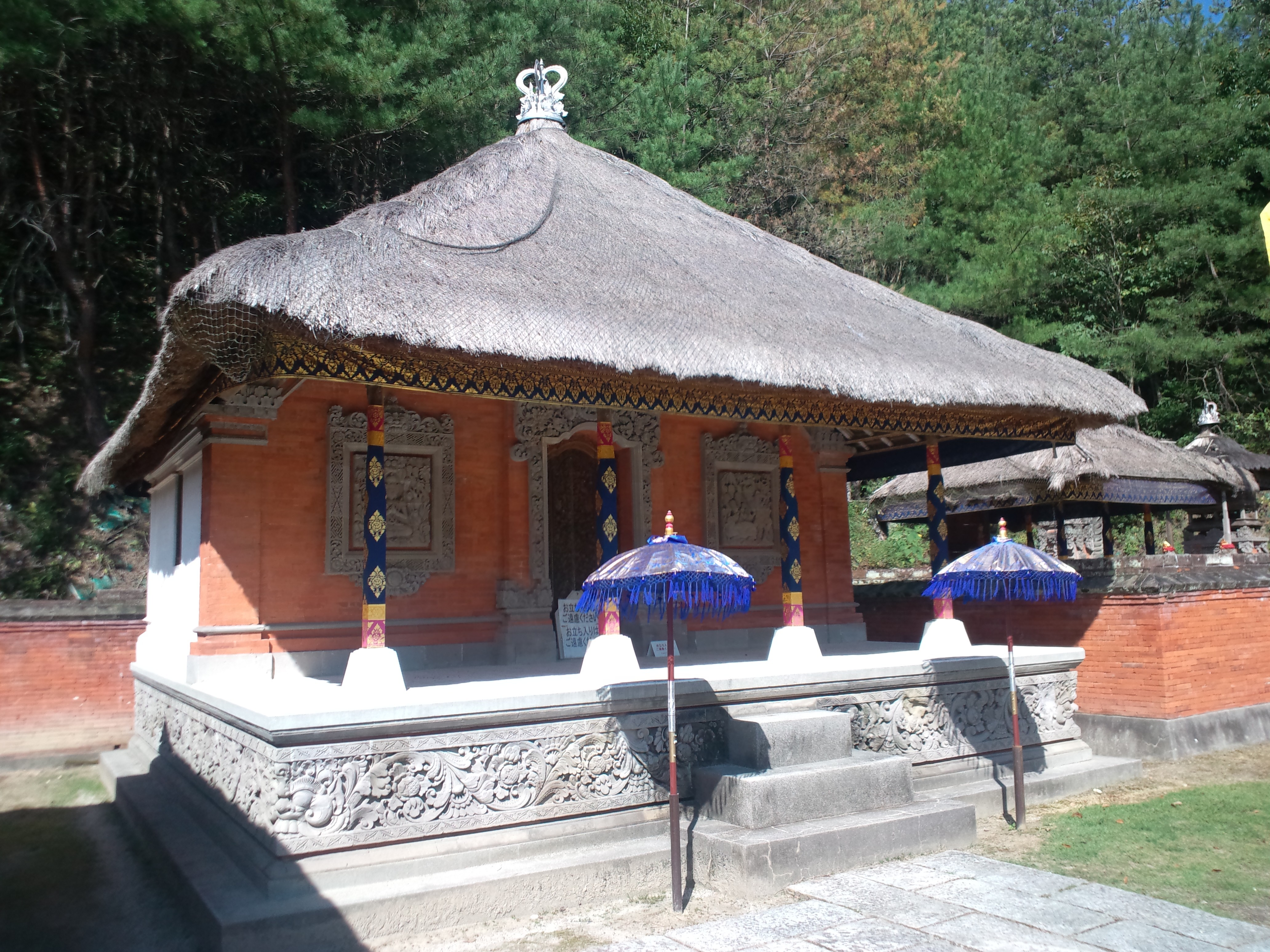
A Balé pavilion within a Balinese house compound.

Unlike European architecture, Balinese houses and puri (palaces) are not created as a single huge building, but rather a collection of numerous structures within walled enclosures each with a special function; such as a front open pavilion to receive guests, main bedroom, other bedrooms, pelinggihan or pemrajan is a small family shrine, living areas, and kitchen. The kitchen and living areas that hold everyday mundane activities are usually separated from a family shrine. Most of these pavilions are created in Balinese balé architecture, a thatched roof structure with or without walls similar to Javanese pendopo. The walled enclosure is connected by a series of gates. Balinese architecture recognizes two types of gates, the candi bentar split gate, and paduraksa or kori roofed gates.

Compared to common Balinese houses, Balinese palace architecture features larger structures, richer ornamentation, and more elaborate decoration. The balé gede is a pavilion of 12 columns, where the oldest male of the family sleeps, while wantilan is a rectangular wall-less public building, where people convene or hold cockfighting. The bale kulkul is an elevated towering structure, topped with a small pavilion where the kulkul (Balinese slit drum) is placed. The kulkul would be sounded as an alarm during a village, city, or palace emergency, or a sign to congregate villagers. In Balinese villages, there is a bale banjar, a communal public building where the villagers congregate.

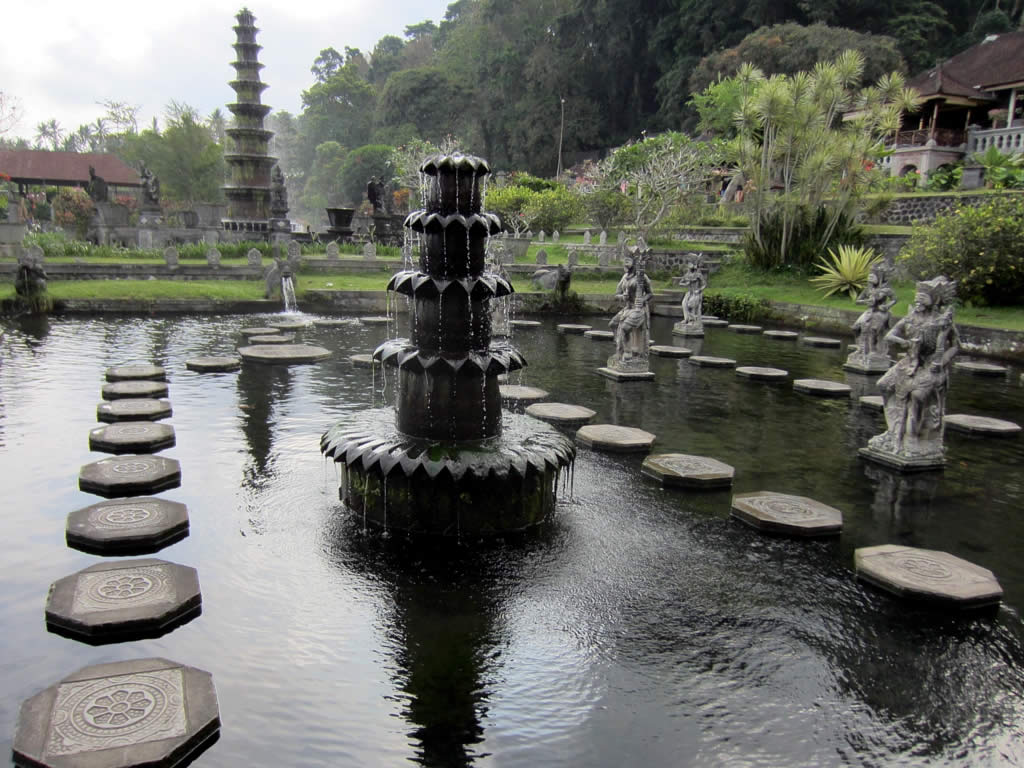
Tirta Gangga water garden

== Landscape architecture ==
Balinese gardens are usually created in a natural tropical style filled with tropical decorative plants in harmony with the environment. The garden is usually designed according to natural topography and hardly altered from its natural state. Some water gardens however are laid out in a formal design, with ponds and fountains, such as Taman Ayun and Tirta Gangga water gardens. Bale kambang, which literary means "floating pavilion", is a pavilion surrounded with ponds usually filled with water lilies. Petirtaan is a bathing place, consisting of a series of ponds and fountains used for recreation as well as for ritual purification bathing. Examples of petirtaan are the bathing structures in Goa Gajah and Tirta Empul.

== Elements of Balinese architecture ==
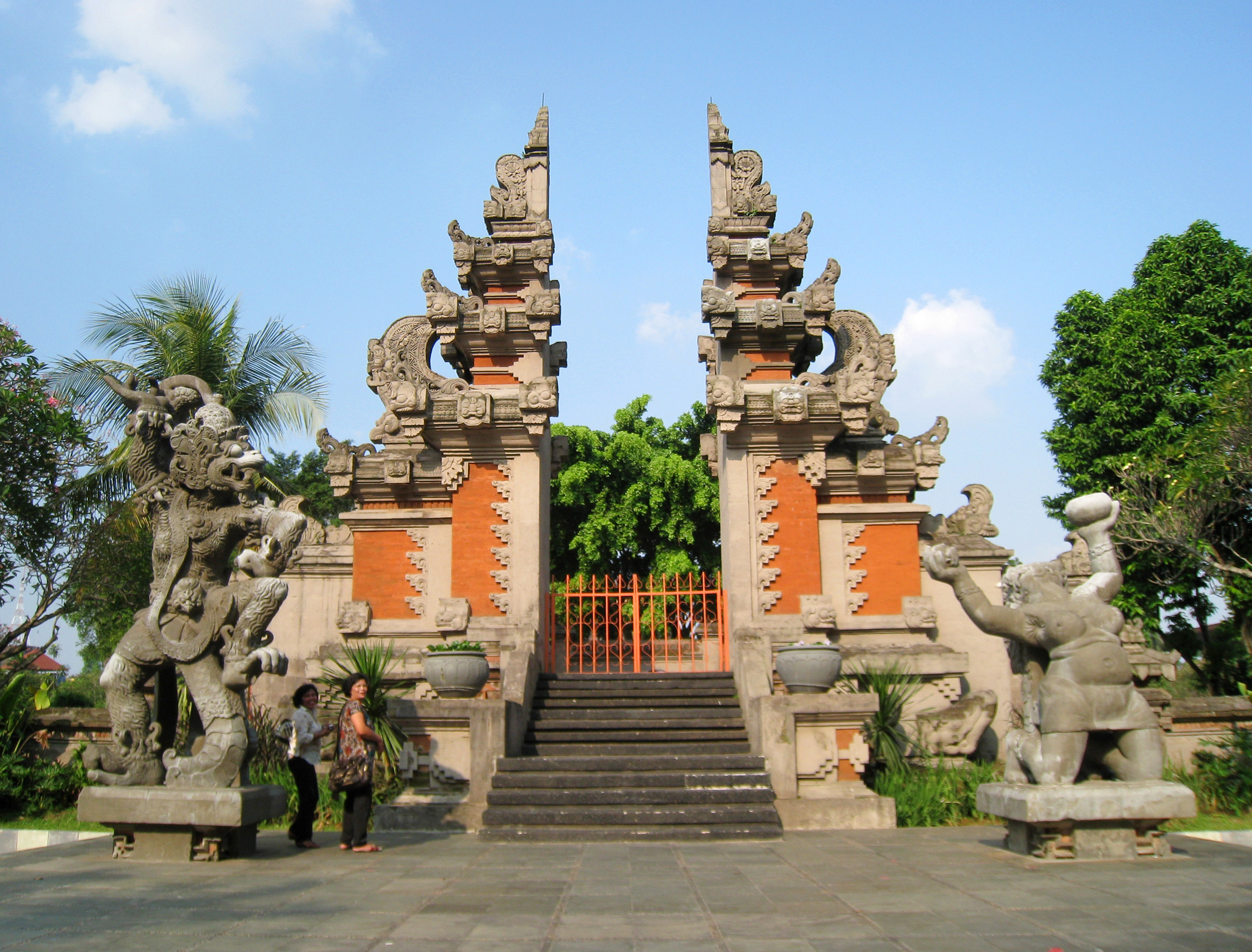
Candi Bentar split gate as the entrance from the outer realm.

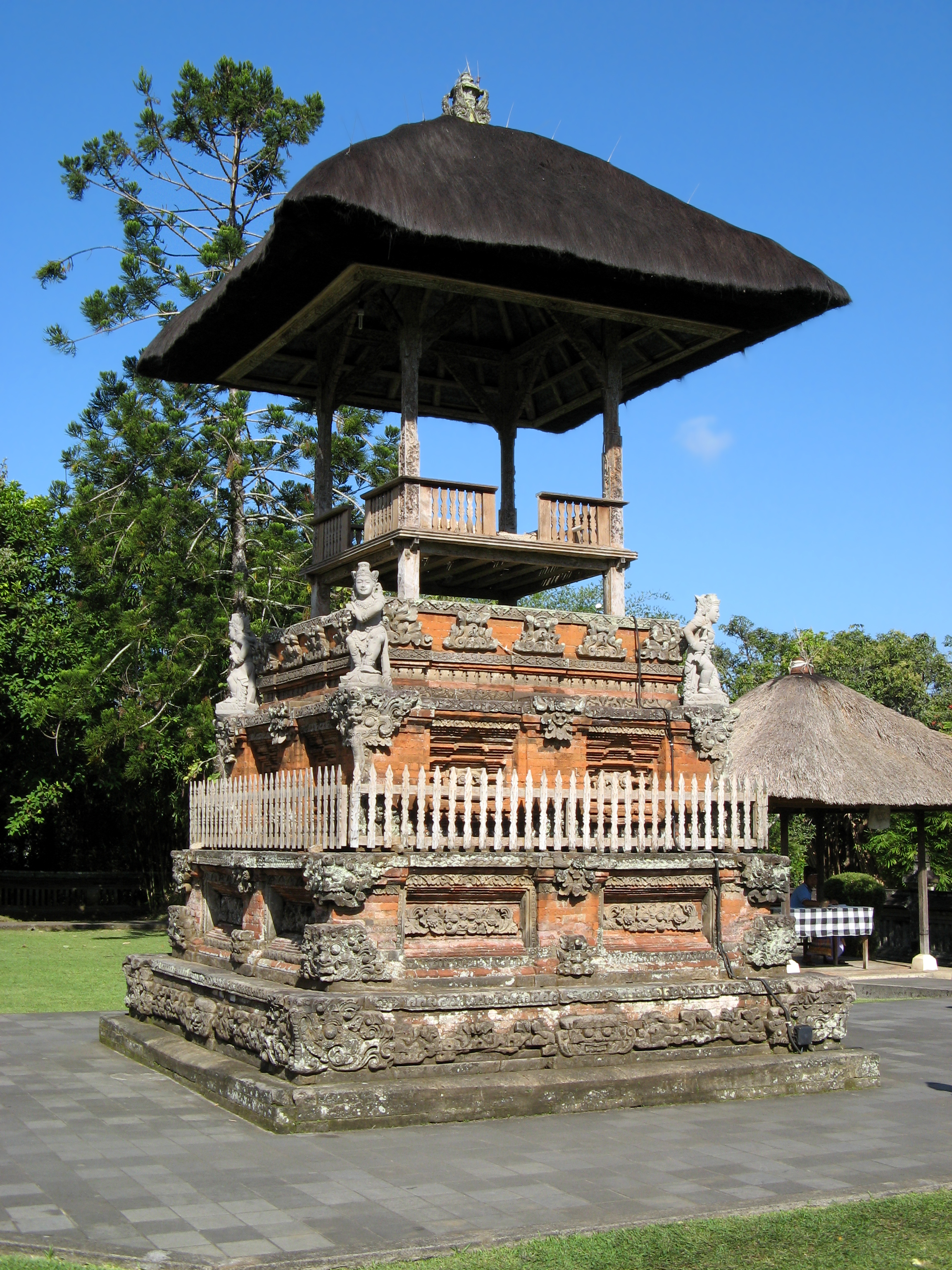
Bale kulkul, a slit drum tower.

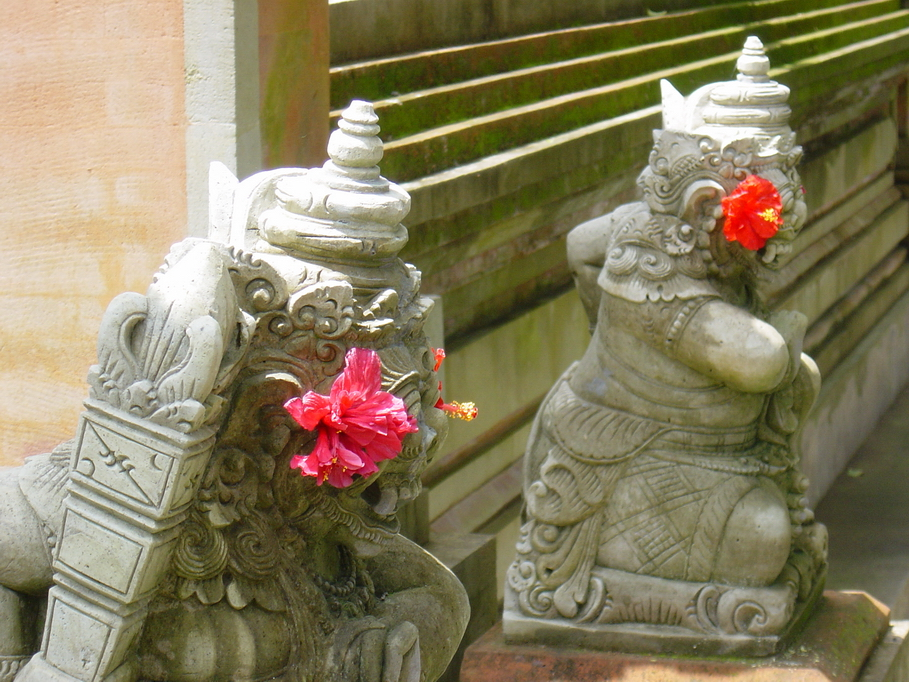
Guardian statues held symbolic meanings also part of decoration in Balinese architecture.

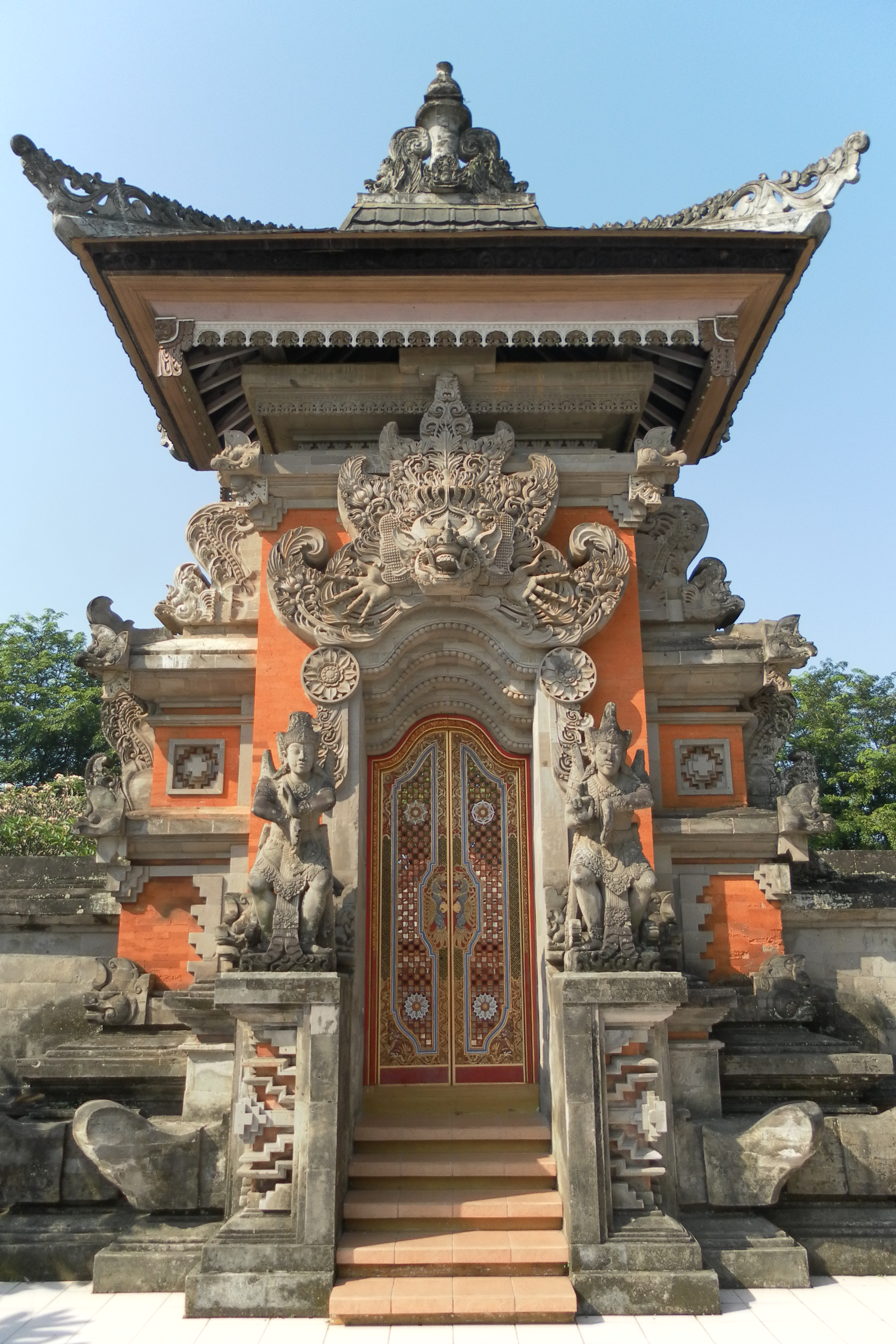
Roofed kori agung gate at the Bali Pavilion of Taman Mini Indonesia Indah.

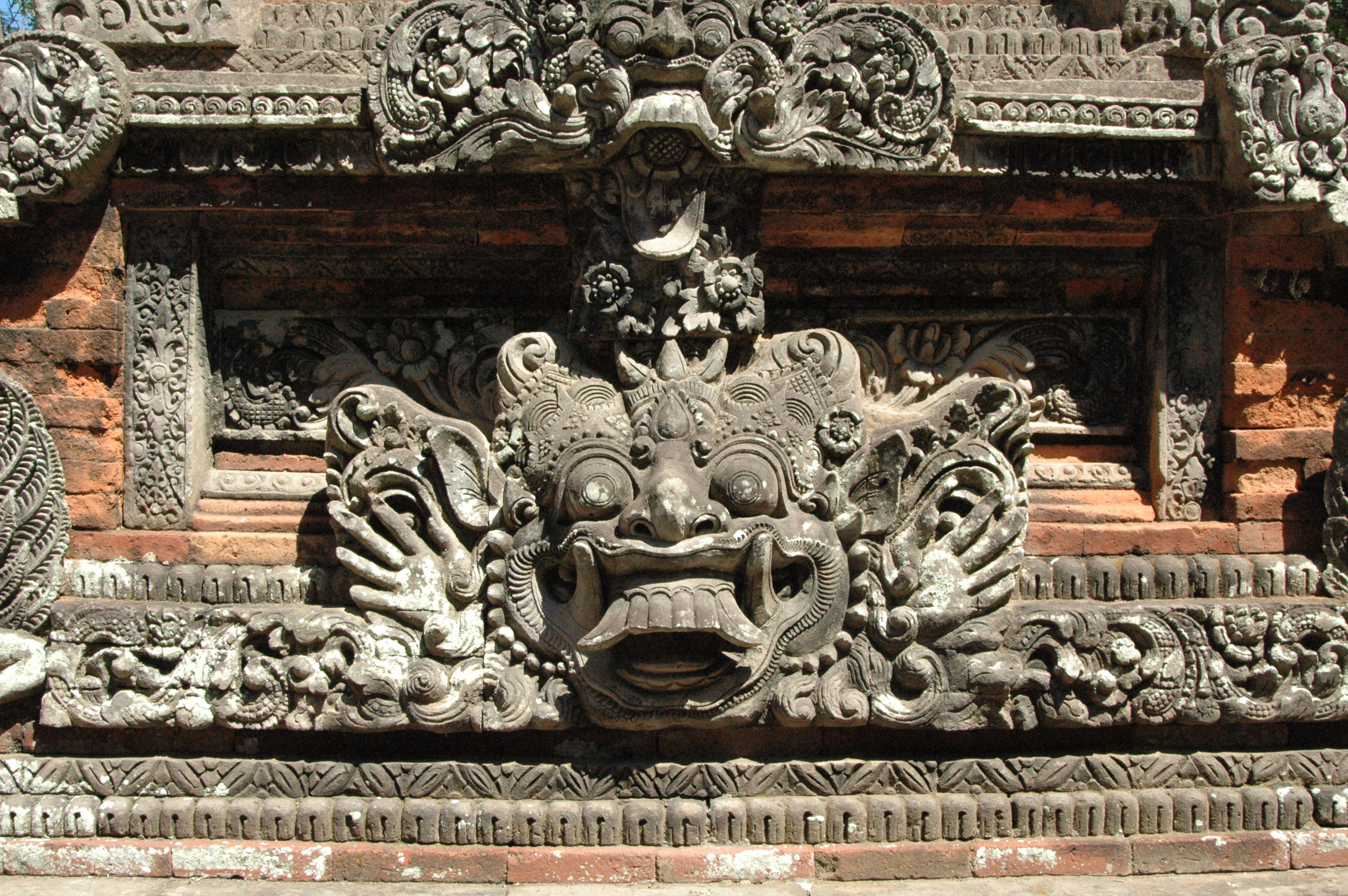
Kala's face is a portal guardian and decoration that also contains symbolic meanings.

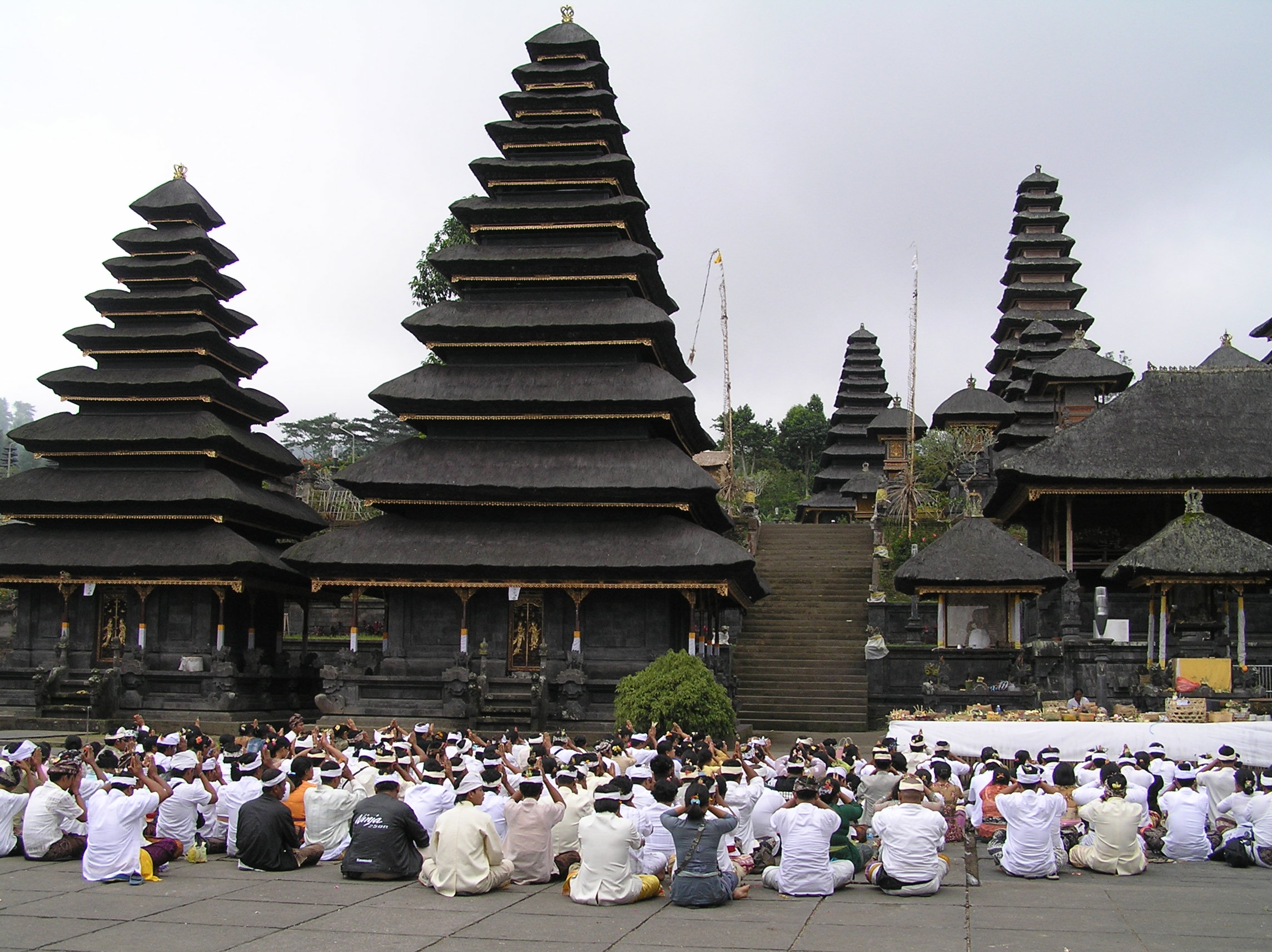
The pagoda-like multi-tiered roof Meru towers, a typical aspect in Pura.

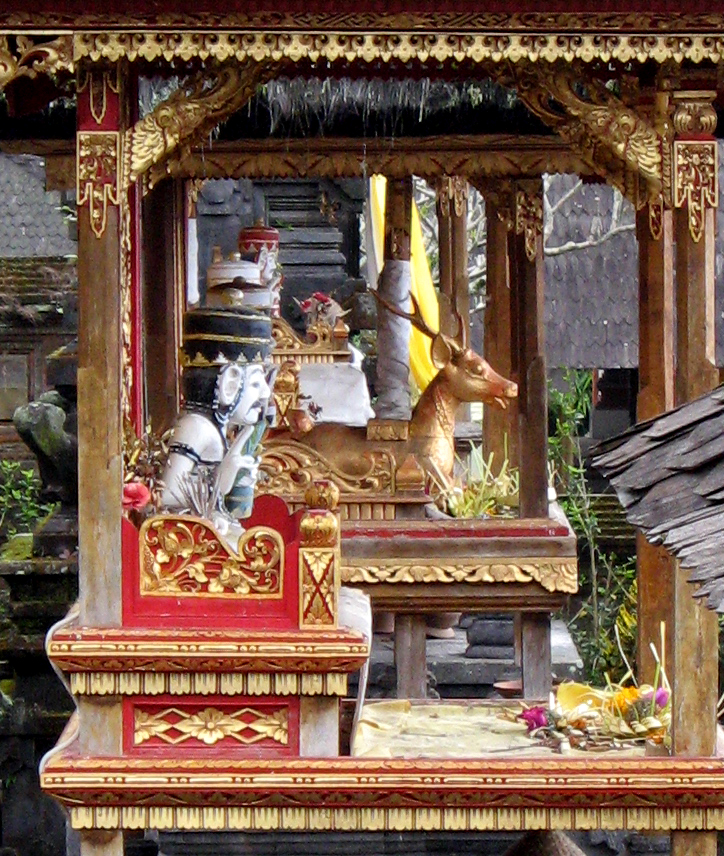
Pelinggih shrines dedicated to certain gods.

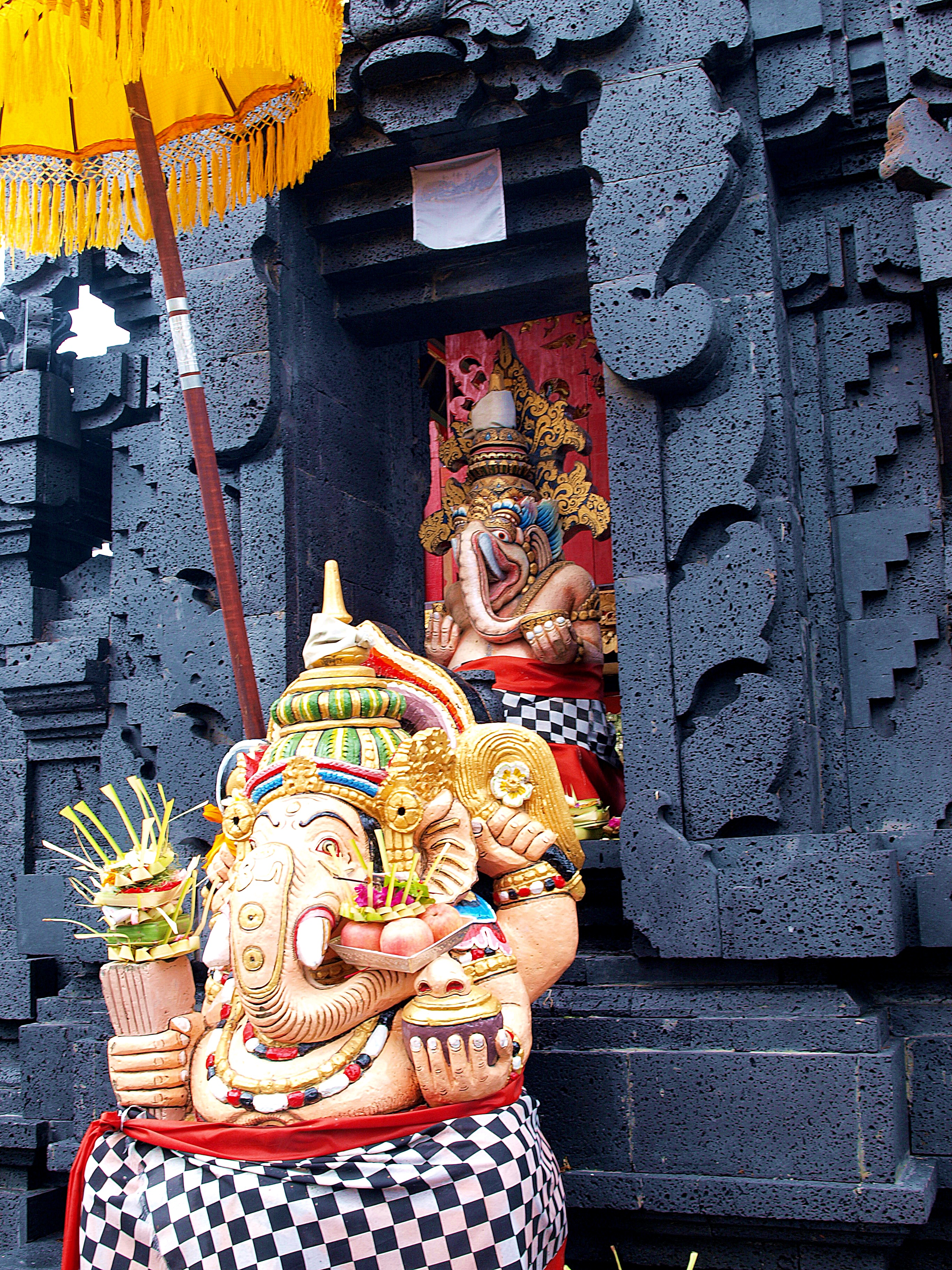
Stana shrines dedicated to Hindu god Ganesha.

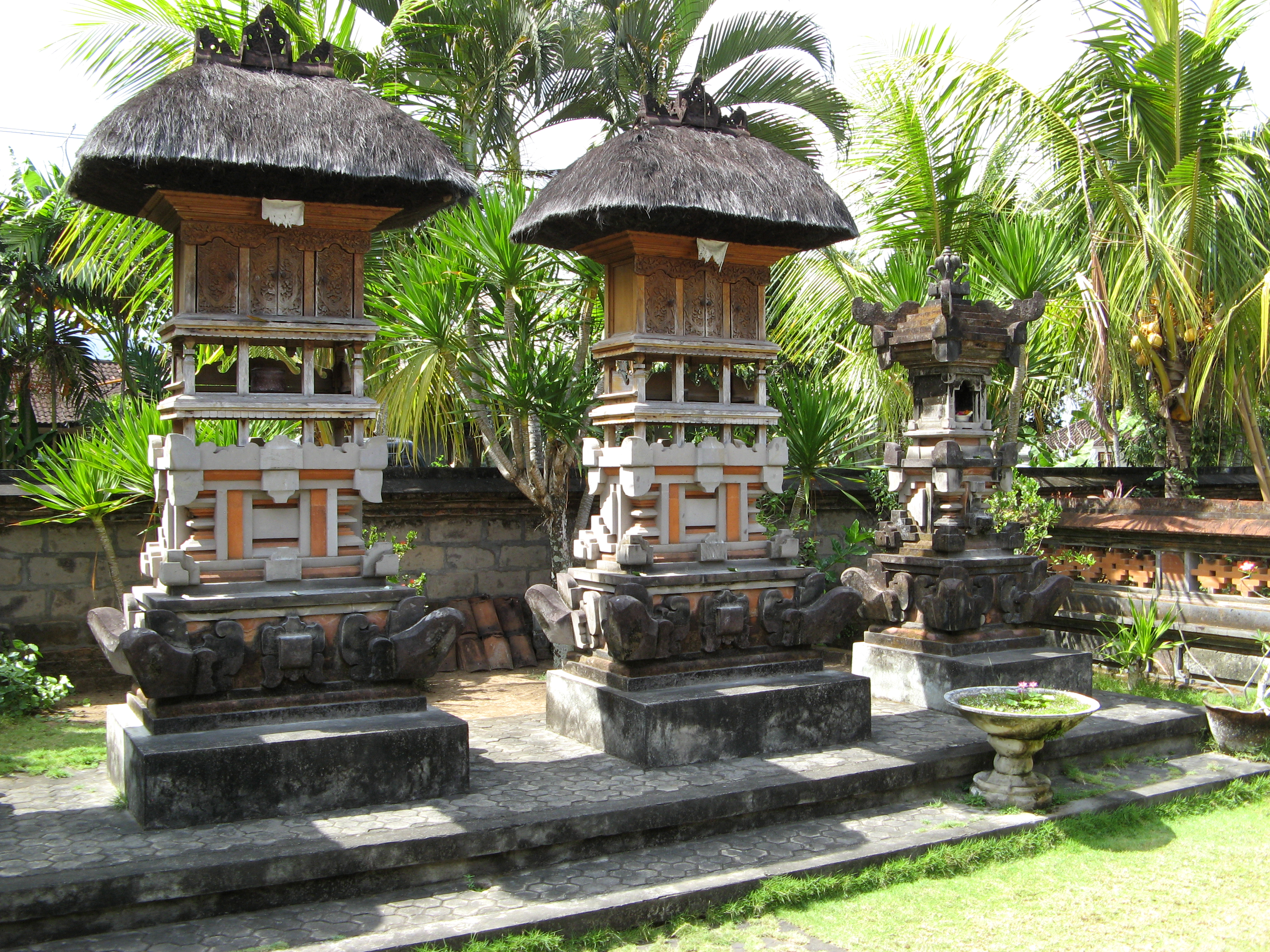
Sanggah kemulan, pemrajan or merajan, small familial house shrines to honor the households' ancestor.

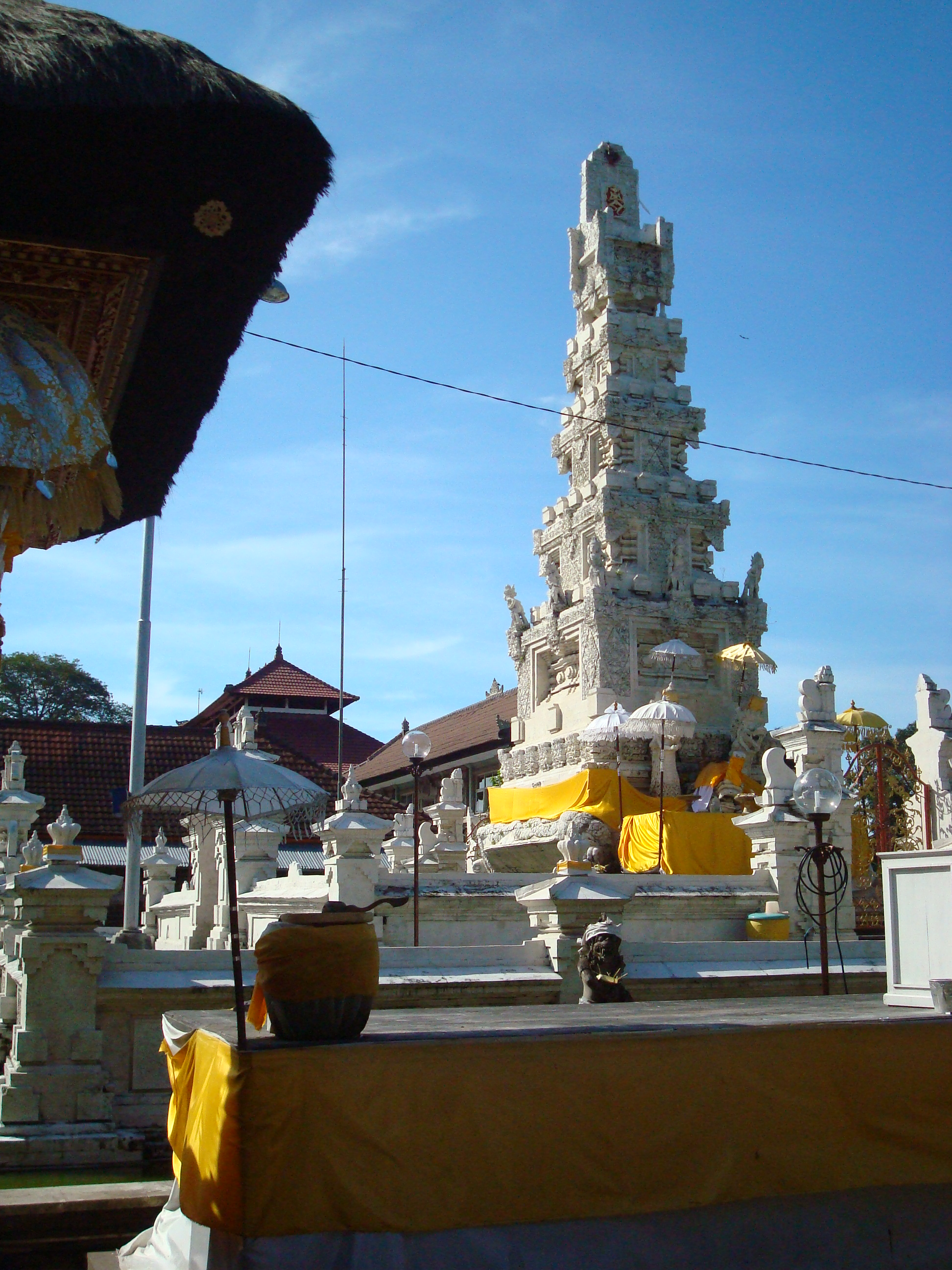
Padmasana, the towering throne of Sang Hyang Widhi Wasa as the focus of worship.

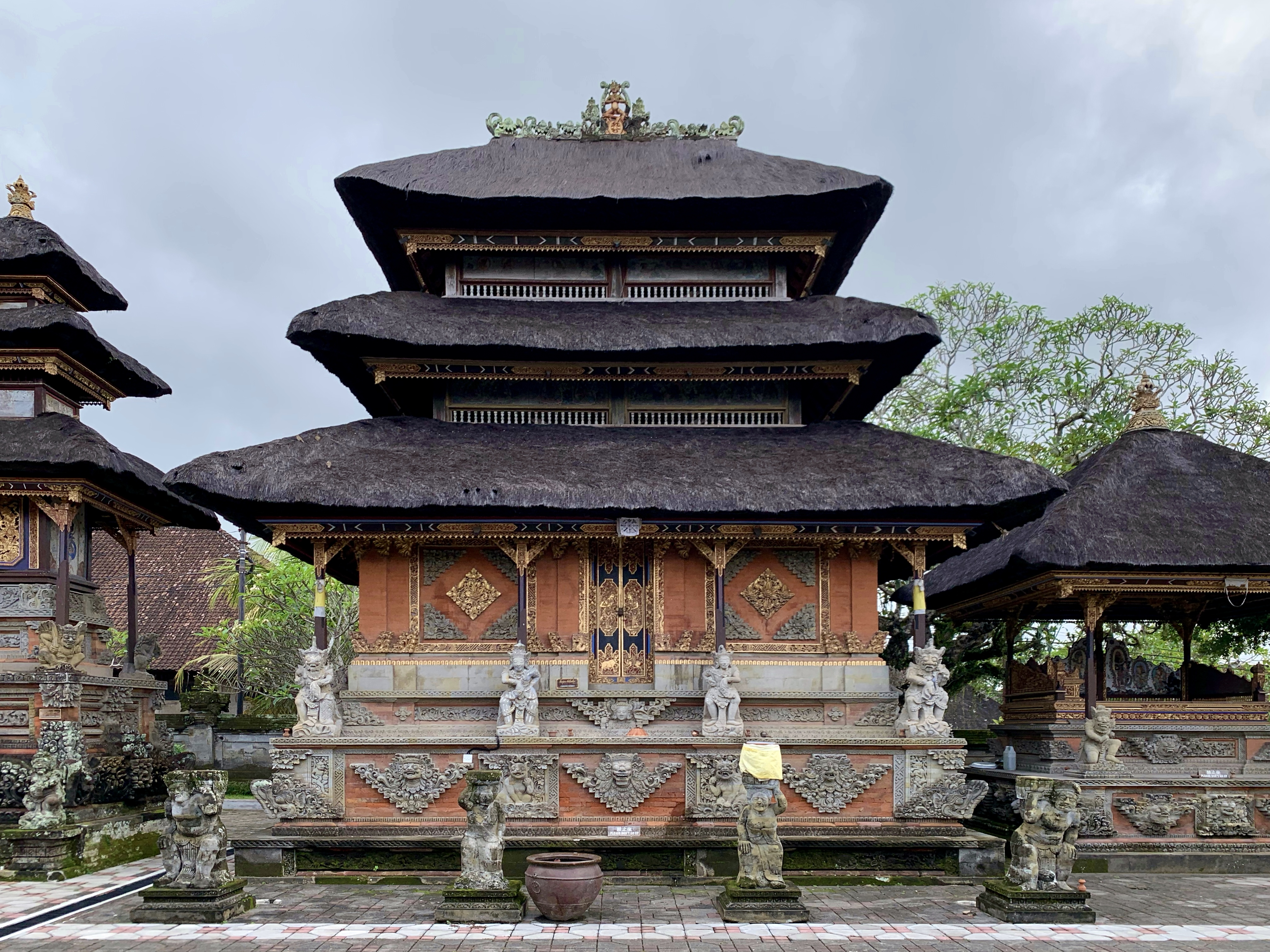
A temple building with multi-tiered roof, Batuan

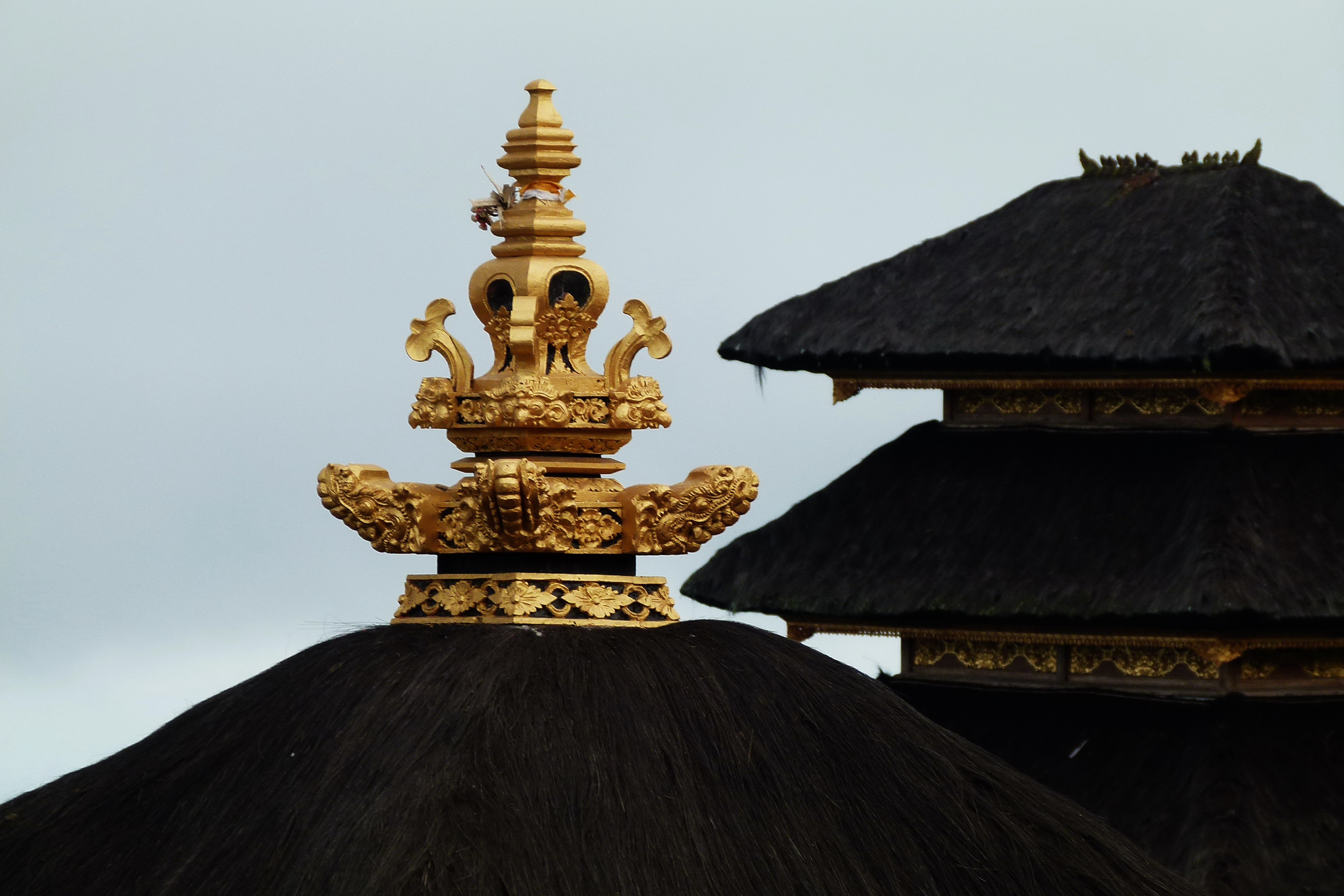
A gold-colored roof pinnacle and thatched roof made of black ijuk fibers.

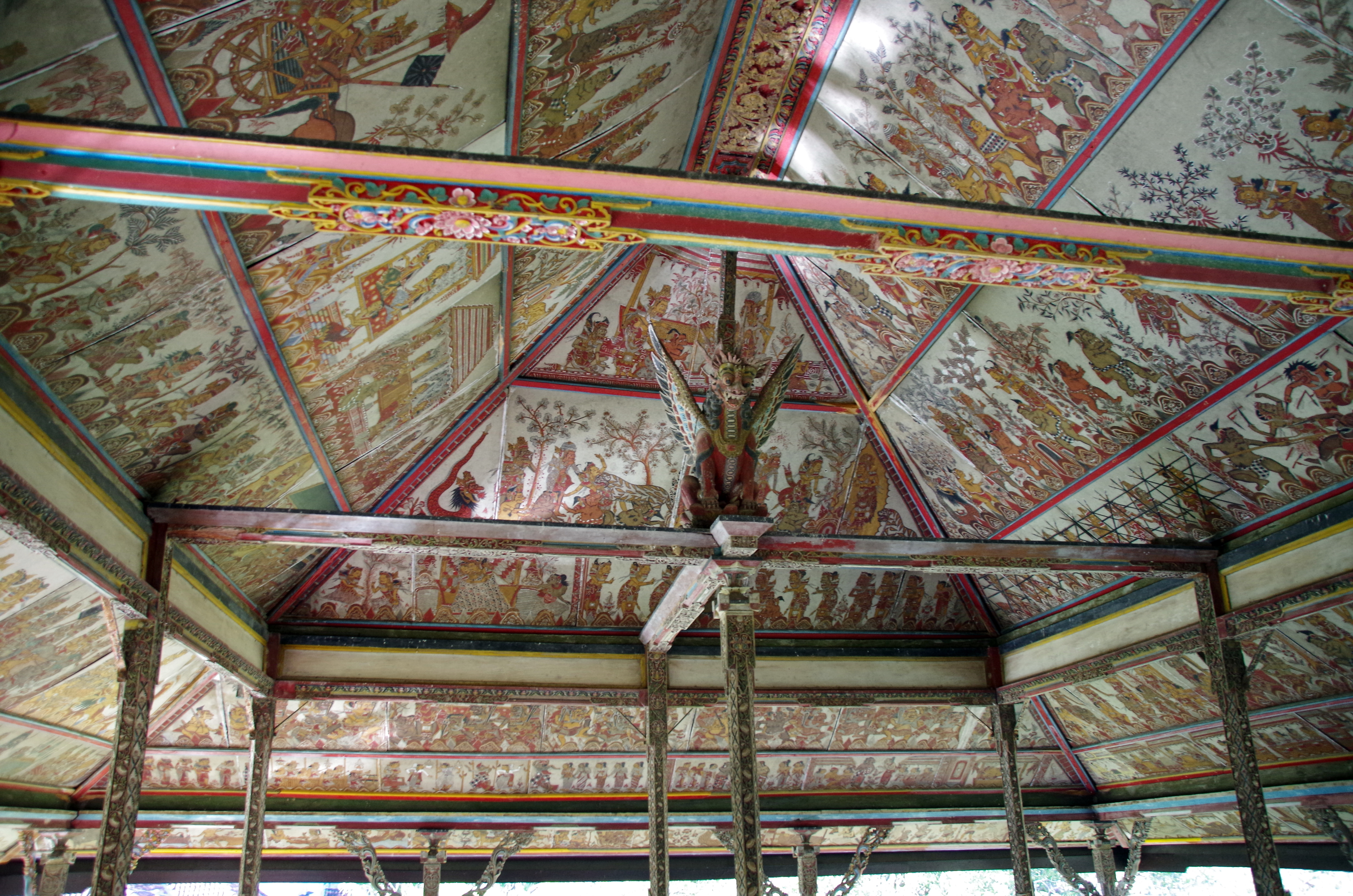
Meticulously painted ceiling in Klungkung Palace.

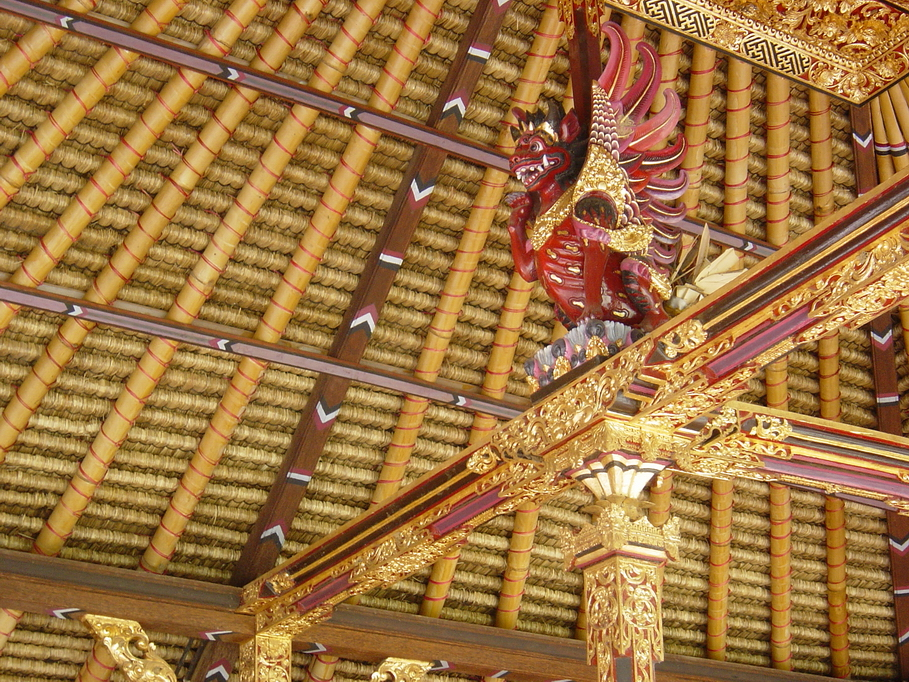
A winged lion as a decoration of the roof interior.

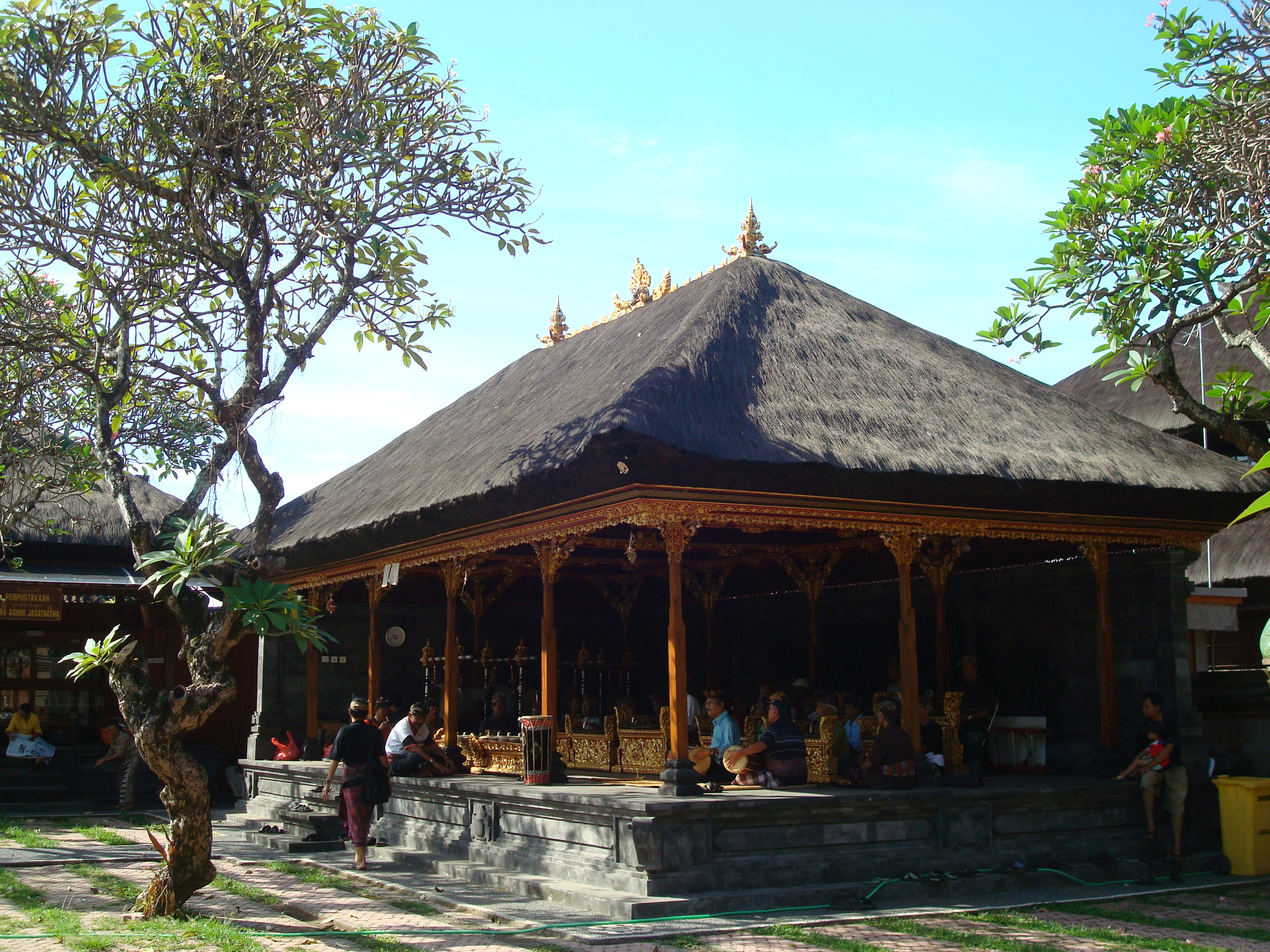
Bale gong, a gamelan pavilion in the Balinese temple compound.

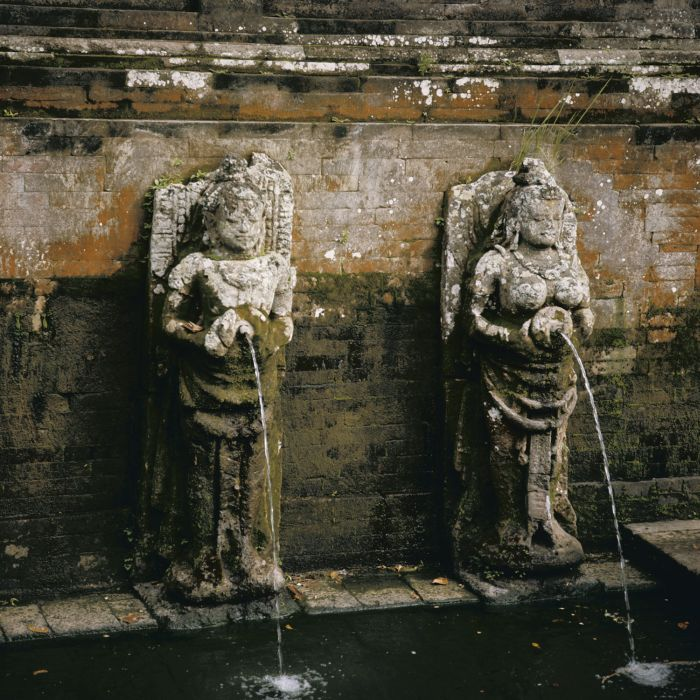
Fountain waterspout statues in Goa Gajah sacred bathing pool.

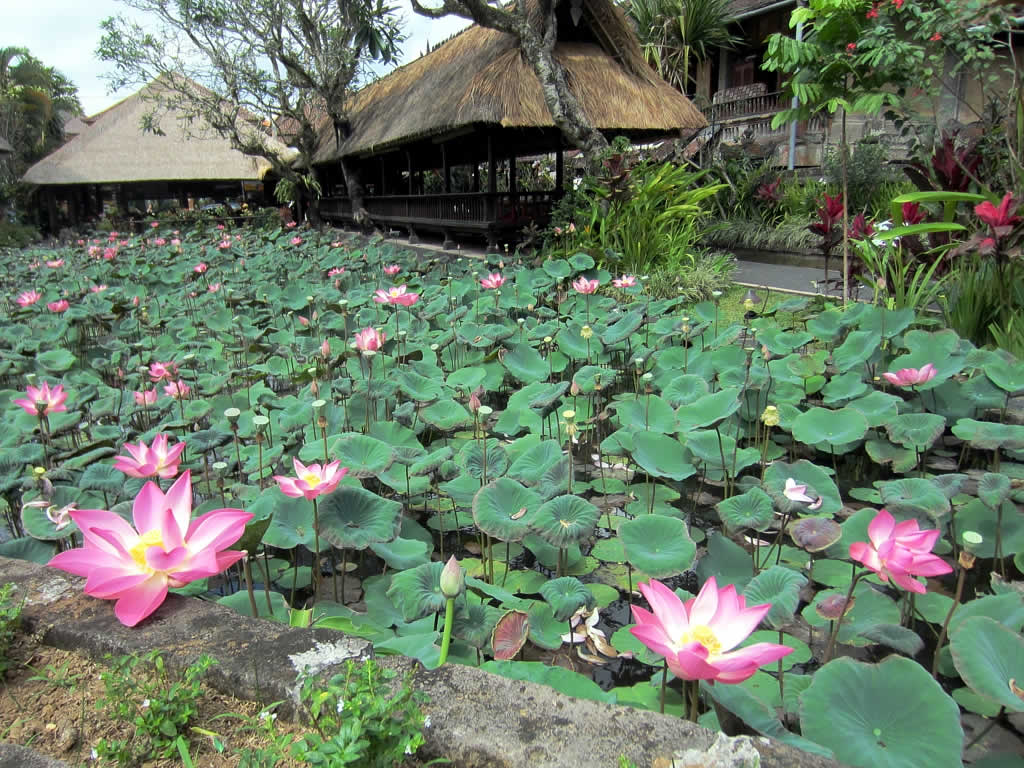
Lotus pond as part of Balinese landscape architecture.

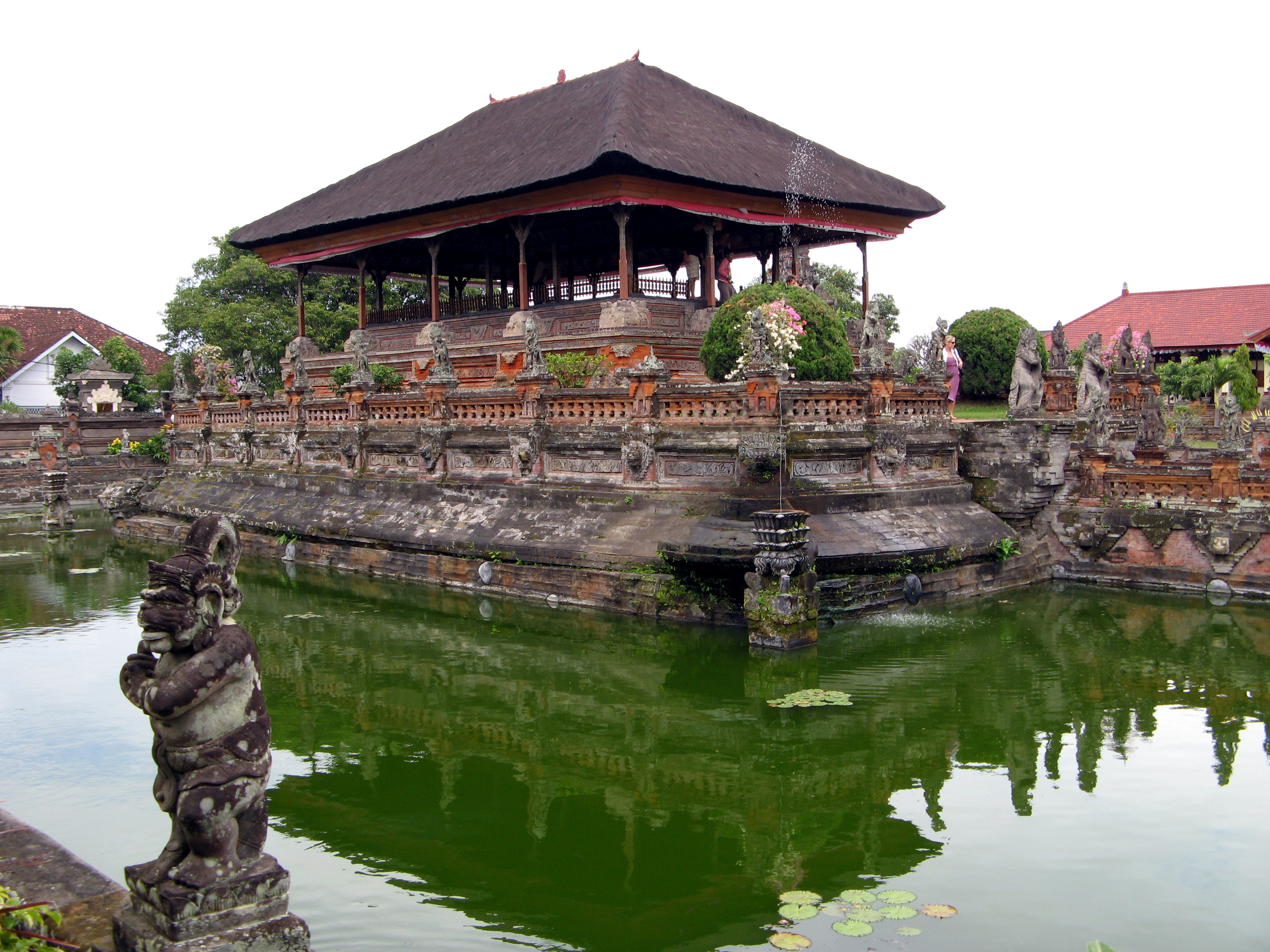
Bale kambang, floating pavilion in a Balinese garden.

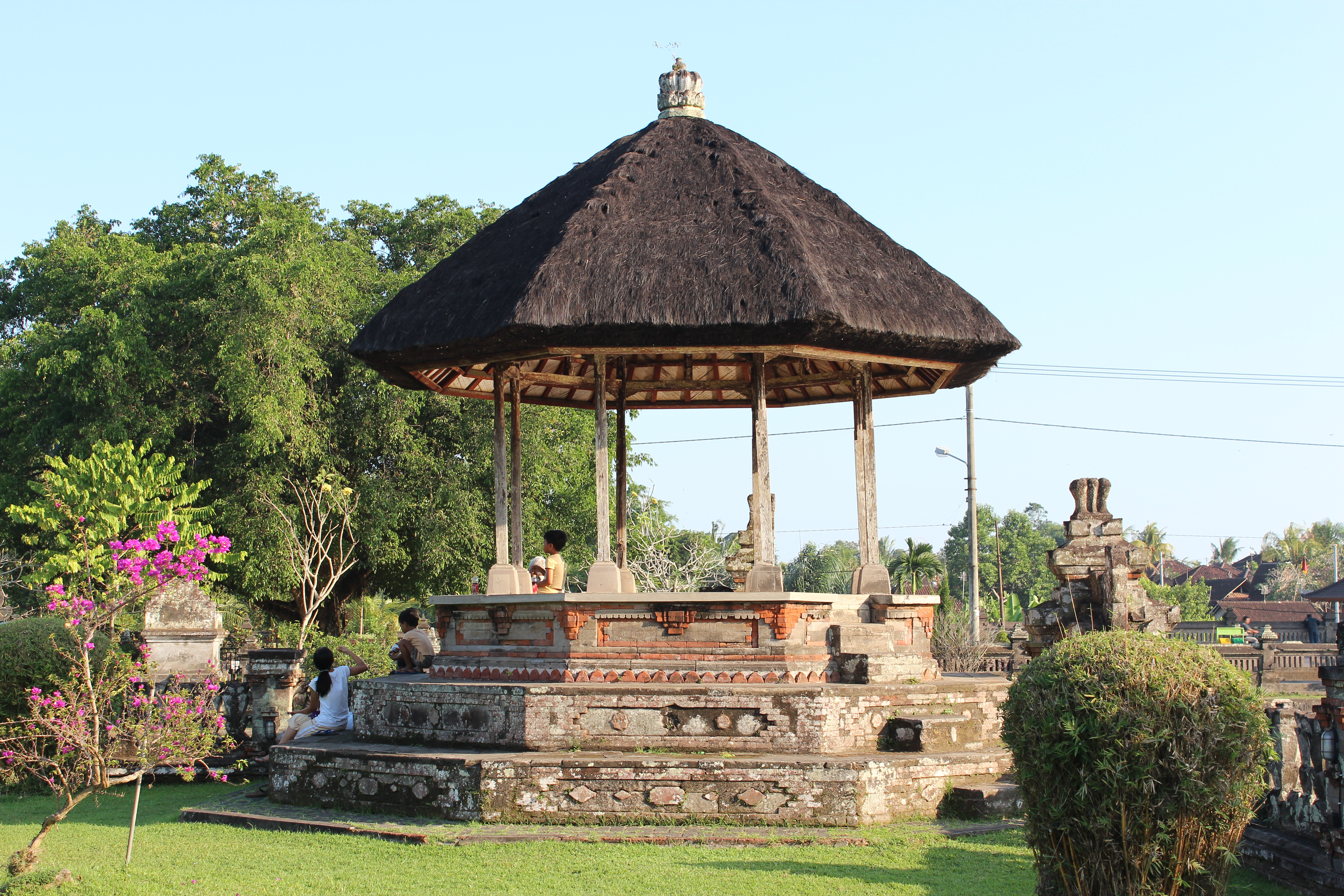
Bale bengong, garden contemplating pavilion.

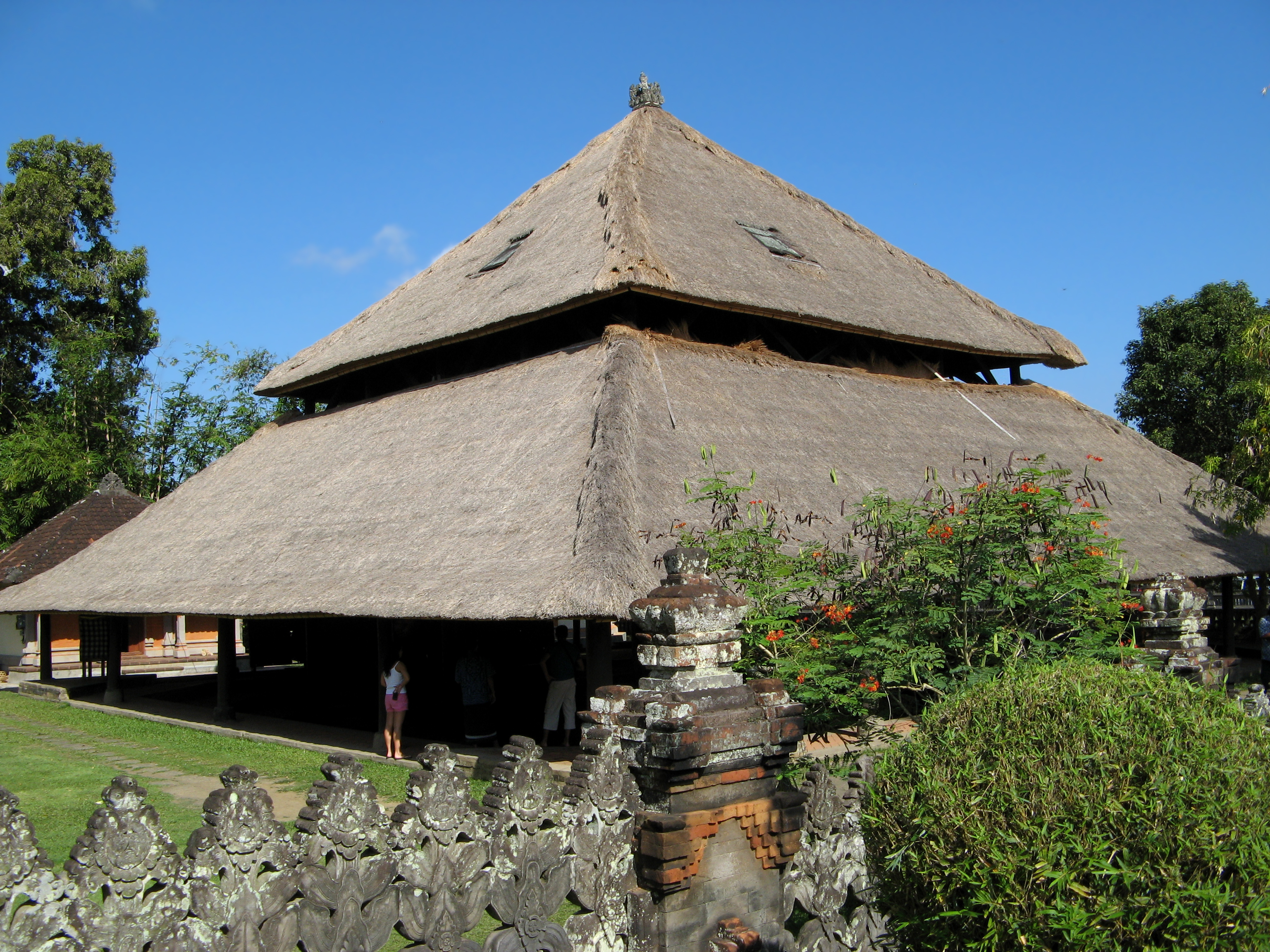
Bale wantilan, a cock-fighting pavilion, is an integral part of a temple.

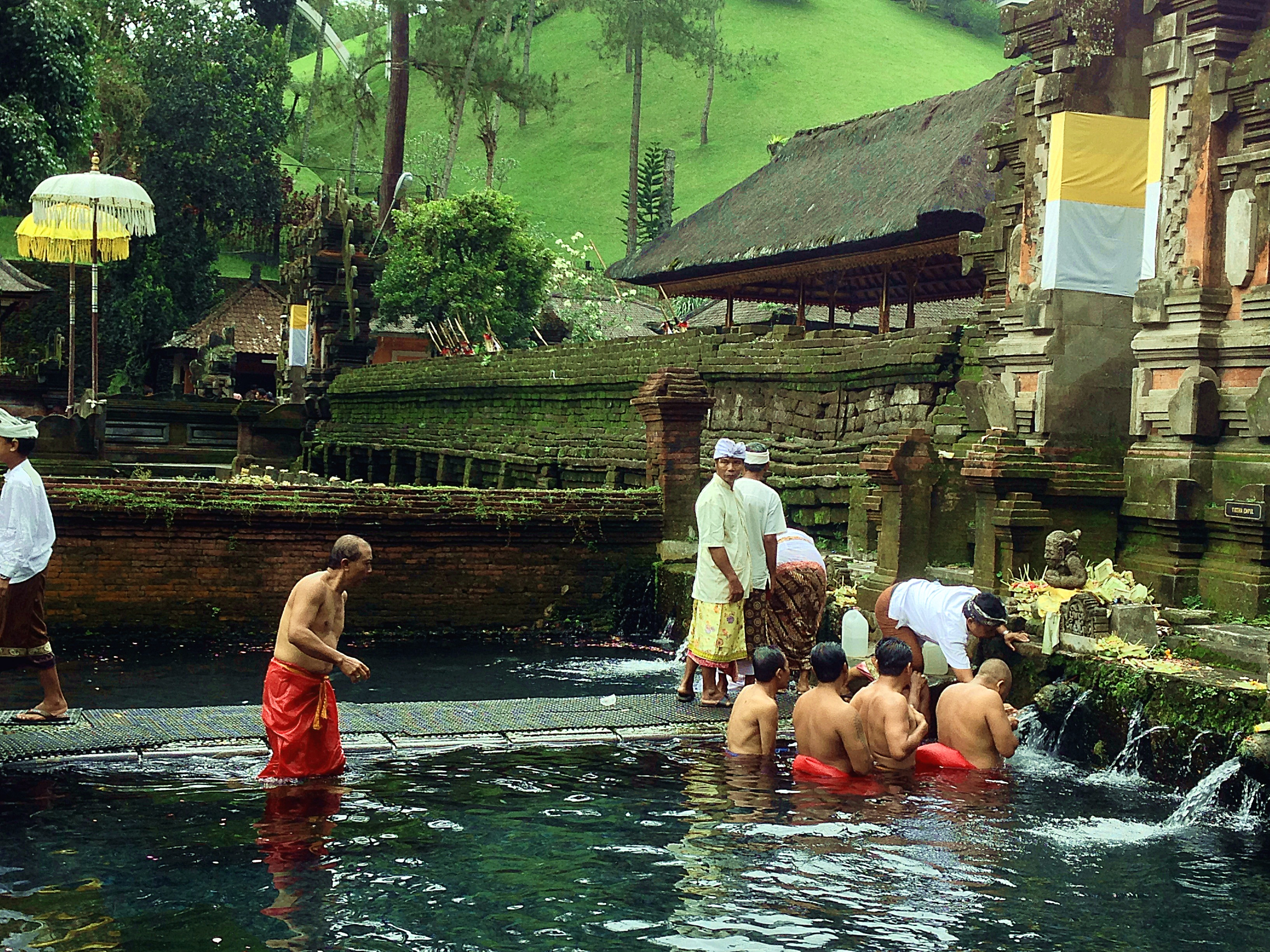
Tirta Empul sacred bathing place.

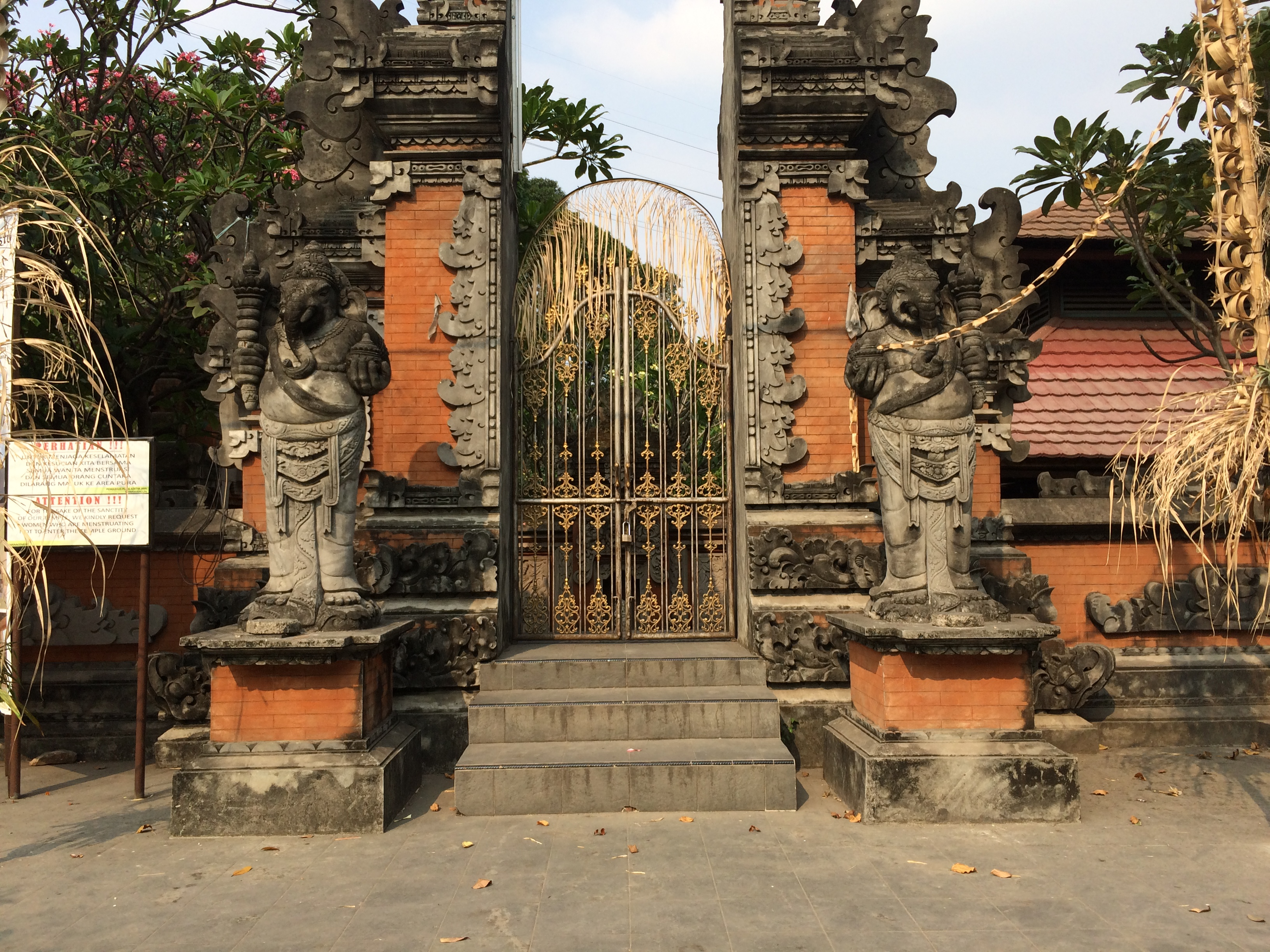
Pura Aditya Jaya in Jakarta.

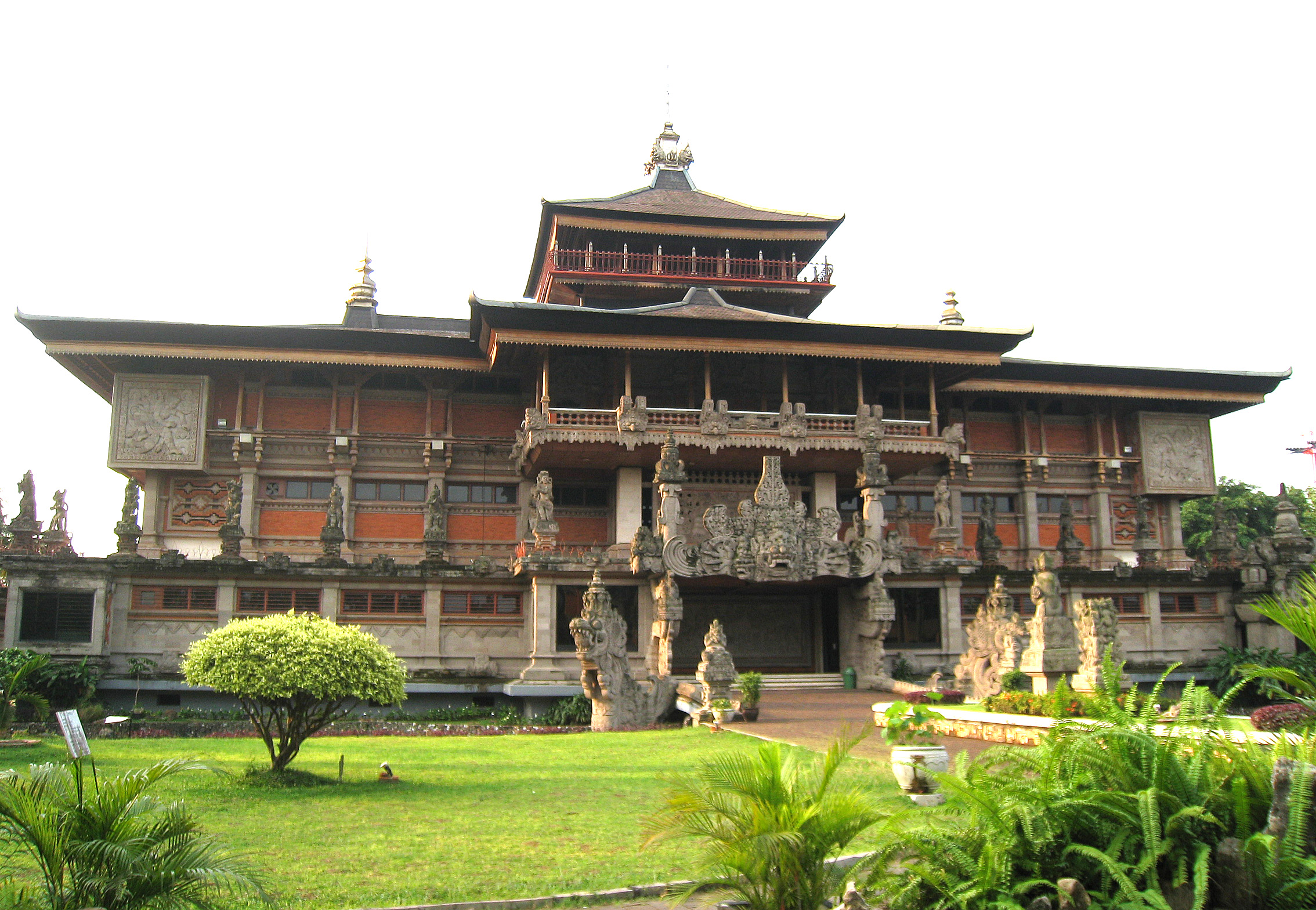
Indonesia Museum in TMII built in Balinese architecture

== Modern Balinese architecture ==
The prominence of Bali as a popular island resort with cultural significance has stimulated demand for modern Balinese architecture applied to tourism-related buildings. Hotels, villas, cottages, restaurants, shops, museums, and airports have incorporated Balinese themes, style, and design in their architecture.

== See also ==
- Bali Aga architecture
- Pura Besakih
- Candi
