= Padmasana (shrine) =

Type of shrine found in Indonesia

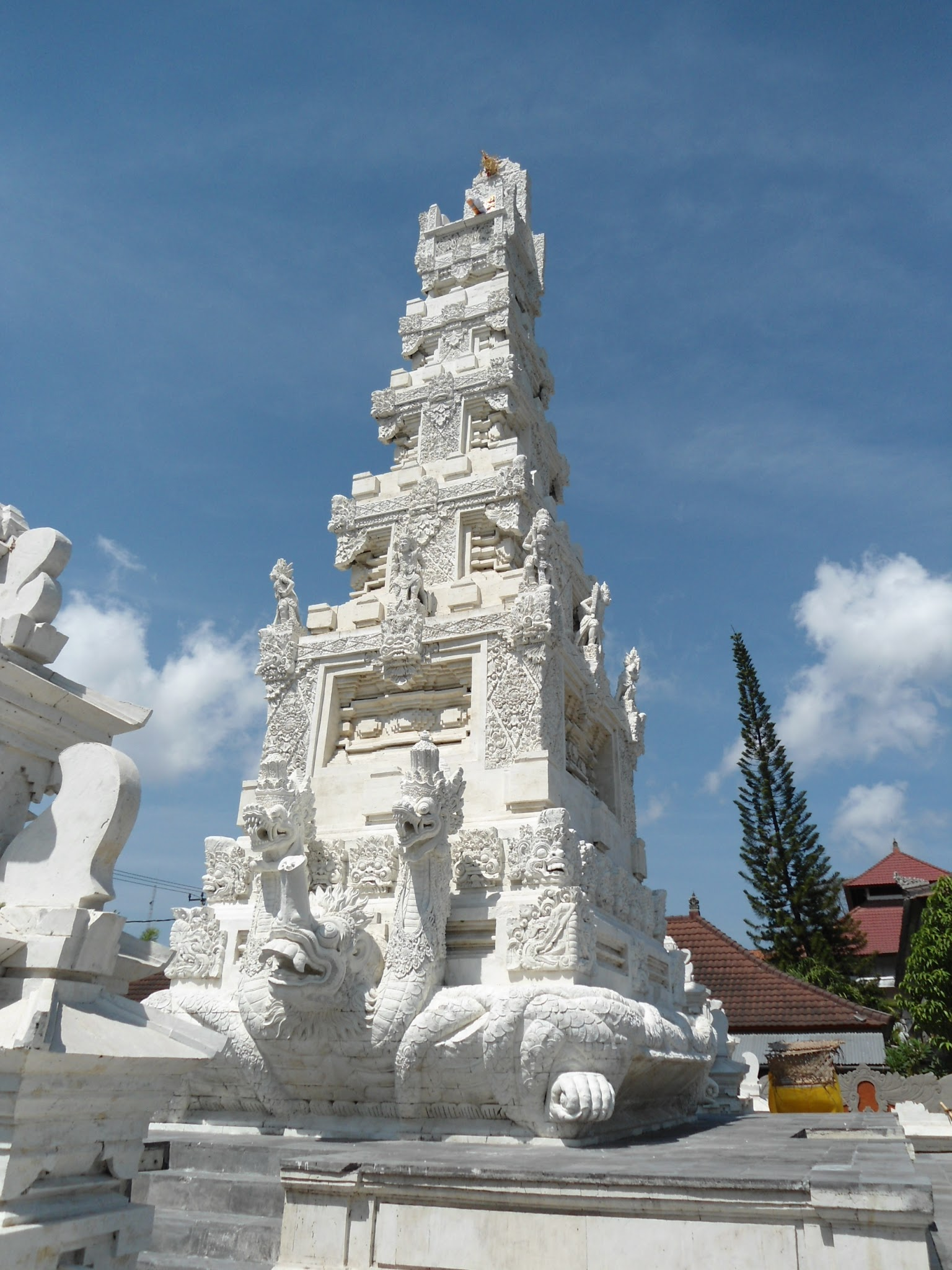
The padmasana main shrine of Pura Agung Jagatnatha in Denpasar, Bali.

A Padmasana is a shrine (Balinese: ᬧᬮᬶᬗ᭄ᬕᬶᬄ, palinggih) in the form of a tower, crowned with an empty throne to worship Ida Sang Hyang Widhi Wasa, a manifestation of Supreme God in Balinese Hindu belief. The term padmasana is derived from the Sanskrit, meaning lotus throne.

A Padmasana shrine is usually located in the Utama Mandala, the holiest of holies of a Balinese temple compound, and is usually the focal point of worship in sembahyang rituals.

== Etymology ==
Padmasana is a Kawi (Old Javanese) word, originally derived from Sanskrit. Padma means "lotus flower" or "center", and asana means "being seated" or "guidance" or "advice". The lotus flower is commonly depicted as a seat for deities in Hindu-Buddhist art. According to one interpretation, it symbolises the (macrocosm) which is the stana (abode or resting place) of God.

== Symbolism ==
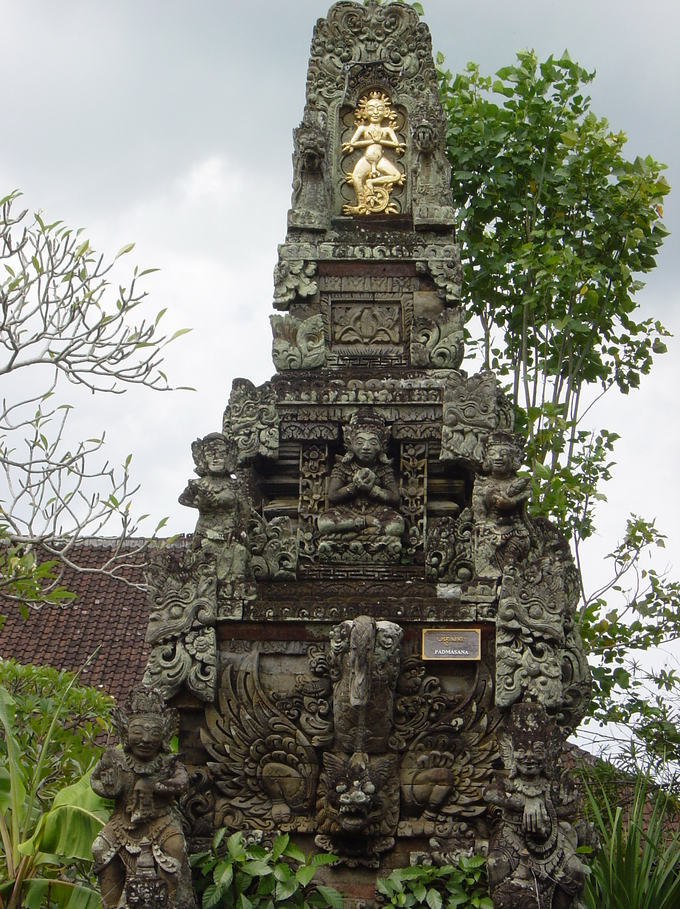
Gilded image of Acintya on top of Padmasana tower

A Padmasana is first described in the lontar scripture Dwijendra Tattwa, written by Dang Hyang Nirartha, the last major reformer of the Shiva-Buddha religion, who arrived in Bali from Java after the fall of the Majapahit empire. Dang Hyang Nirartha established and introduced the padmasana structure as a shrine to worship the supreme God (Parama Shiva) in Bali in the 16th century.

A Padmasana is a symbol of the universe (Balinese: Bhuana Agung), depicted as the towering throne (Balinese: stana) of the supreme God, Ida Sang Hyang Widhi Wasa.A Padmasana is said to symbolise universal balance. It consists of three main parts, namely tepas (base), batur (body), and sancak (top).

The symbolism on the Padmasana includes a sculpture of Bedawang Nala, a mythical turtle that was seen to support the universe, and sculptures of two sacred Nagas (snake deities): Anantaboga and Basuki.

According to Balinese mythology, Bedawang Nala's movements could cause earthquakes. Likewise, if the Anantaboga snake wags its tail, it can shake the earth. It is believed that Bedawang Nala is the symbol of magma in the bowels of the earth, while Anantabhoga symbolises the ground. The Basuki symbolises the water in the ocean. According to myth, the two snakes bound Bedawang Nala to ensure the stability and balance of the world.

The top of a padmasana structure is crowned with an empty throne, often decorated with a gilded image of Acintya or a solar Swastika.

== See also ==
- Candi bentar
- Paduraksa
- Architecture of Indonesia
- Balinese architecture
