= Sang Hyang Widhi Wasa =

Supreme God in Balinese Hinduism

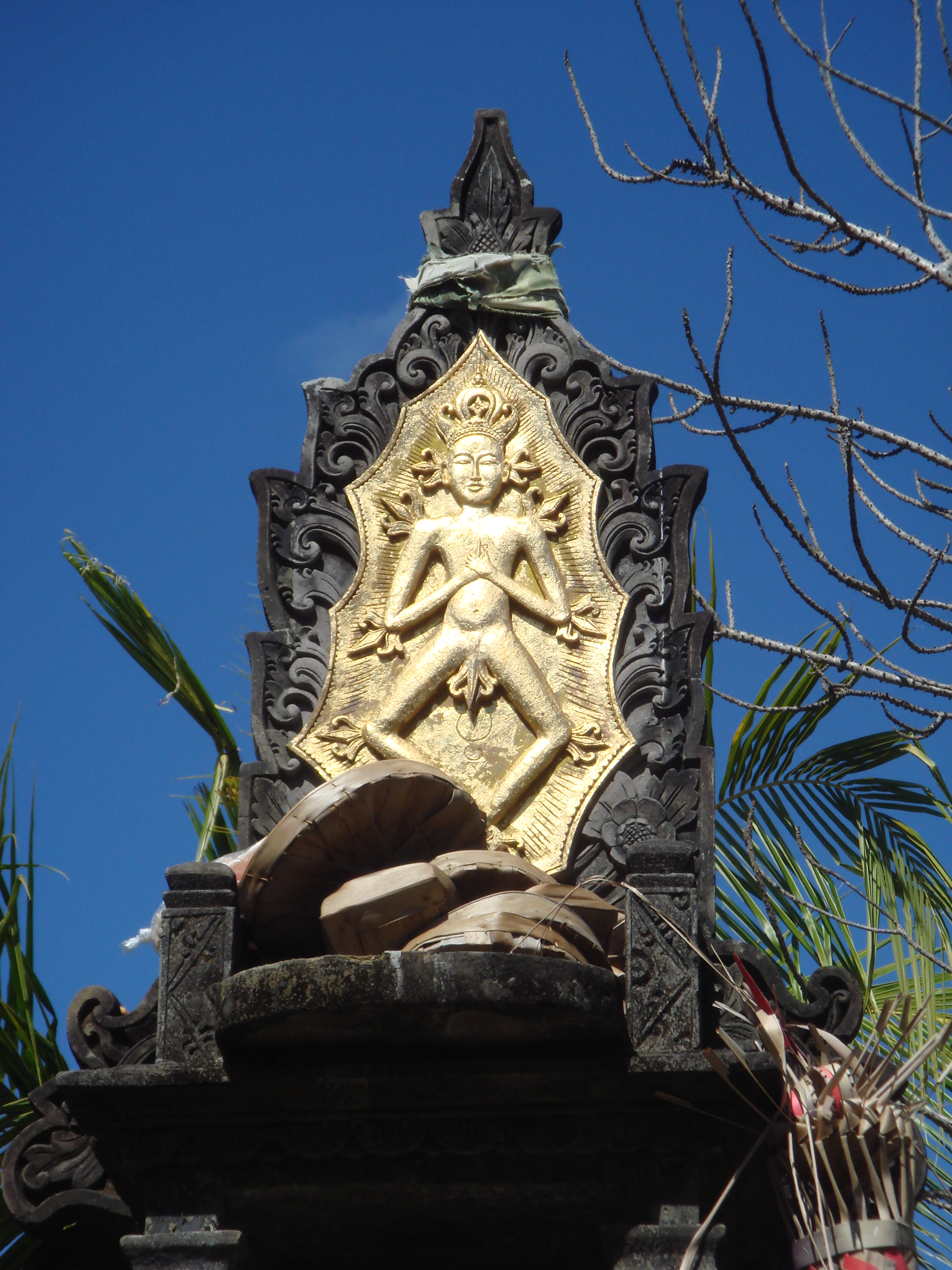
- Depiction of Sang Hyang Widi in the form of Acintya radiating sun god, on the back of an empty throne on the top of Padmasana shrine, Jimbaran, Bali
- Affiliation: Supreme God
- Symbol: empty throne

Sang Hyang Widhi Wasa (Alternatives: Ida Sang Hyang Widhi Wasa, Sangyang Widi Wasa, Acintya, or Sang Hyang Tunggal) is the supreme divine principle in Balinese Hinduism and in Indonesian Hindu theology more broadly. The name is translated as “The Divine Order” or “The One Supreme God.” Sang Hyang Widhi Wasa is not a personal god, but an absolute, ineffable source from which all divine manifestations arise.

The role of Sang Hyang Widhi Balinese devotion has evolved over time in line with the Indianization of Balinese Hinduism, the movement towards monotheism, and to suit Indonesia's constitutional and legal requirements for the classification of official religions. The concept of Sang Hyang Widhi is strongly associated with the concept of Brahman in Indian Hinduism and has been likened to the concept of God in Christianity and God in Islam.

== Etymology ==
The name Sang Hyang Widhi Wasa is derived from Sanskrit and Old Javanese elements. Hyang comes from Old Javanese and is often used to describe spirits and deities. When prefixed with the term Sang, it is used as an honorific for sacred or divine beings such as gods. For example, Sang Hyang Siwa may be used to refer to the god Shiva. Widhi (also spelled Widi) is a Balinese word that historically meant fate, luck or knowledge, but is also understood to mean law, order or cosmic balance. Wasa ᬯᬰ in Balinese is borrowed from the Old Javanese waśa which in turn derived from the Sanskrit vaśa वश, meaning power or authority. In the Indonesian, Javanese and Balinese languages, the name Sang Hyang Tunggal may be used where tunggal means "one" or "one and only".

== Theology ==
Sang Hyang Widhi Wasa is understood as formless, eternal, and beyond human comprehension. It precedes creation and is regarded as the ultimate origin, sustainer, and dissolver of the universe. All gods (dewa), spirits, and cosmic forces are interpreted as manifestations or emanations of this single supreme reality.

This theological position reflects a monotheistic approach to Hinduism, comparable in some respects to the concept of Brahman in Indian Hindu philosophy, though articulated within a distinctively Balinese cosmological and ritual framework. Jean Couteau argues that whilst many local deities endure in Balinese Hinduism, they are increasingly being made into manifestasi (manifestations) of Sang Hyang Widi, and their original names are being erased. He contends that "there is a long slide towards monotheism, increasingly coloured by Indian Hindu reformism."

Eiseman describes Sang Hyang Widi as "the unification of all manifestations of God into one single, all-powerful God, more or less equivalent to the Christian God and the Islamic Allah".

== Form and representation ==
=== Acintya ===
Sang Hyang Widhi Wasa is most commonly expressed inconographically through the concept of Acintya (Sanskrit: अचिन्त्य), meaning “inconceivable” or “that which cannot be thought.” Acintya is a symbolic and personalised representation of the unknowable nature of God. It has a deep history and use in Javanese and Balinese culture predating the use of the name Sang Hyang Widi by hundreds of years where it was often used to refer to Shiva in the Shaivite tradition.

Acintya is often associated with the concept of the sun god Surya. This association reflects the idea that, just as the blinding light of the sun cannot be looked at directly, the true nature of the supreme divine principle cannot be fully apprehended. In its most common graphical representation, Acintya appears in human form as a naked man, surrounded by flames. His nakedness symbolises pure consciousness, indicating a state beyond attachment to the senses.

=== The Padmasana ===
The primary architectural symbol of Sang Hyang Widhi Wasa in Balinese temples is the padmasana (“lotus throne”). The padmasana is a tall shrine, typically located in the most sacred orientation of a temple complex. It was introduced into Bali by the priest Dang Hyang Niratha in the 16th century to represent the god Shiva which was being asserted as the supreme god through the Shaivism cult. Whilst it was generally only found in important temples (puras) in the past, today the shrine is ubiquitous in Bali.

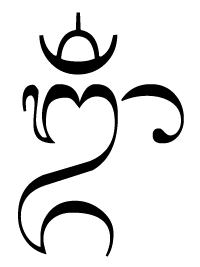
Omkara symbol represented in Balinese script

The shrine is characterised by:

- An empty throne, symbolising the formless and ineffable nature of the Supreme God
- A lotus base, representing cosmic purity and origin
- Mythical creatures such as Bedawang Nala and nāga serpents at the base, representing primordial and underworld forces

=== Om ===
Om (Balinese: ᬒᬁ) is a polysemous symbol representing a sacred sound, seed syllable, mantra, and invocation in Hinduism. Just as it is used to represent Brahman in Indian Hindu religion, so to is it used to invoke the essence of Sang Hyang Widhi for Balinese Hindus. When used in prayers and mantras it is directed towards Sang Yhang Widhi such as the Tri Sandhya and Kramaning Sembah prayers.

== Historical development ==
In former times, the name Sang Hyang Widhi Wasa was known only to a few scholars. It was developed in consort with Christian missionaries who were attempting to translate the concept of a singular God using a name sufficiently un-Indian in character. It was introduced as an object of worship in the 1920s by the first reformers of Balinese religious tradition.

In the 1950s the concept of Sang Hyang Widhi Wasa was articulated by Balinese religious leaders to assert a monotheist interpretation of Balinese Hinduism to satisfy Indonesian legal requirements. Balinese Hindus initiated a series of student and cultural exchange initiatives between Bali and India to help formulate the core principles behind Balinese Hinduism. In particular, the political self-determination movement in Bali in the mid-1950s led to the joint petition of 1958 which demanded the Indonesian government recognize Hindu Dharma. This joint petition quoted the following Sanskrit mantra from the Hindu scriptures:

Om tat sat ekam eva advitiyam Translation: Om, thus is the essence of the all-pervading, infinite, undivided one.

— Joint petition by Hindus of Bali, 14 June 1958

The petition's focus on the "undivided one" was to satisfy the constitutional requirement that Indonesian citizens have a monotheistic belief in one God with Ida Sanghyang Widhi Wasa being identified as the undivided one. In the Balinese language, this term has two meanings: "the Divine ruler of the Universe" and "the Divine Absolute Cosmic Law". This creative phrase met the monotheistic requirement of the Indonesian Ministry of Religion in the former sense, while the latter sense of its meaning preserved the central ideas of dharma in ancient scripts of Hinduism.

== See also ==
- Acintya
- Brahman
- Sang Hyang Adi Buddha
