= Acintya =

Supreme God of Indonesian Hinduism

Acintya (from Sanskrit: अचिन्त्य, "the inconceivable", "the unimaginable"), is a theological and symbolic concept in Indonesian Hinduism that expresses the ineffable nature a supreme divine principle in Indonesian Hindu theology. Acintya is conceptual and iconographic representation of the ultimate reality that lies beyond thought, form, and direct worship.

== Concept and meaning ==
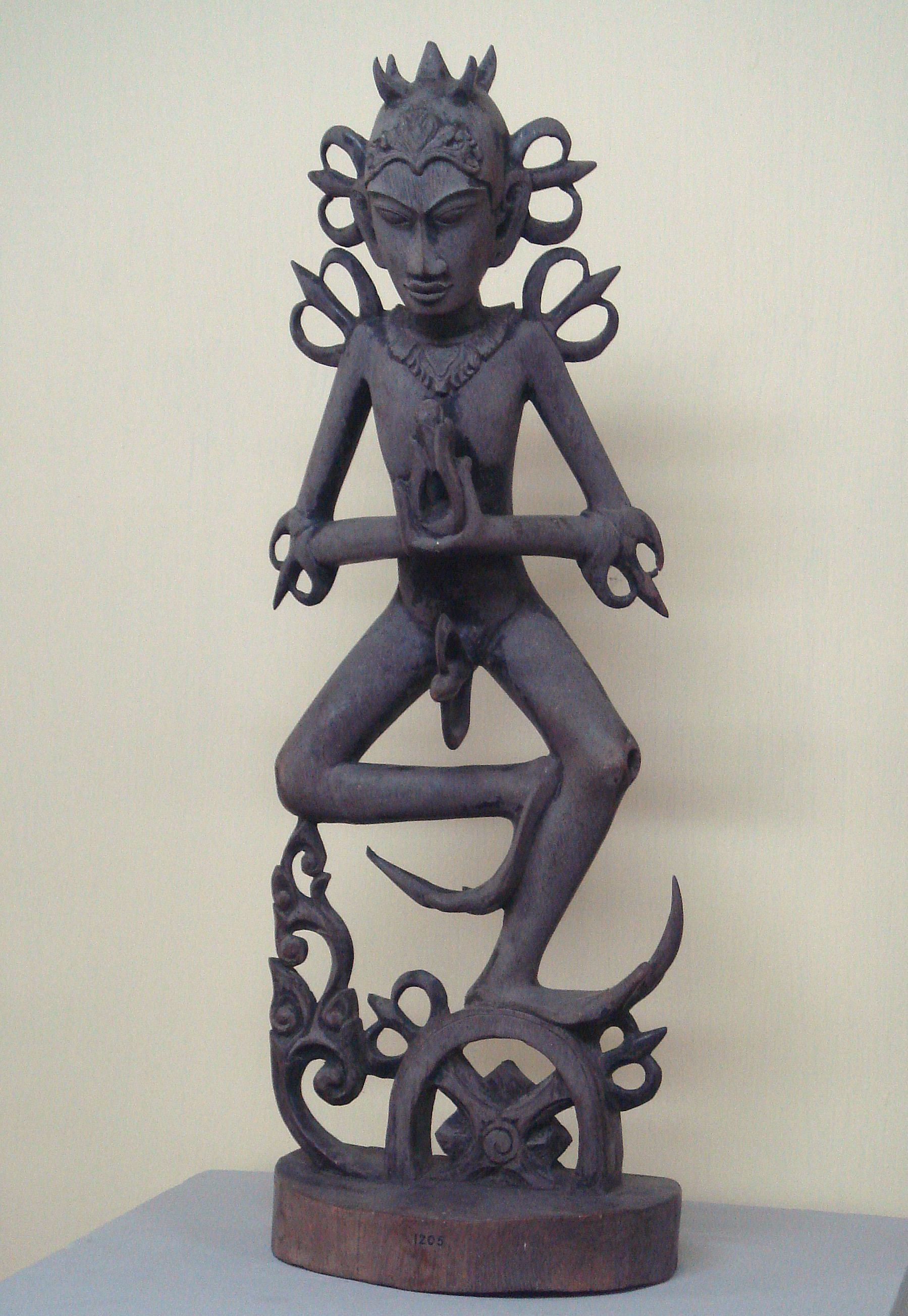
Statuette of Achintya, Bali Museum

Acintya is a symbolic and personalised representation of the unknowable nature of God. It has a deep history and use in Javanese and Balinese culture predating the modern use of the name Sang Hyang Widhi Wasa for the supreme god in Balinese Hinduism. Acintya has been used in Java and Bali for hundreds of years where for the most part it was used as a conceptual manifestation of the supreme god Shiva in the Shaivite tradition.

Acintya is often associated with the concept of the sun god Surya. This association reflects the idea that, just as the blinding light of the sun cannot be looked at directly, the true nature of the supreme divine principle cannot be fully comprehended. In its most common graphical representation, Acintya appears in human form as a naked man, surrounded by flames. His nakedness symbolises pure consciousness, indicating a state beyond attachment to the senses.

Acintya appears prominently on padmasana shrines in Balinese temples, where it may be represented either aniconically—through an empty throne—or anthropomorphically as a human figure.

Acintya's form provide the ability to graphically represent the concept of god in temple reliefs and classical Balinese painting, particularly in Kamasan-style works. In such contexts, Acintya is often placed at the uppermost register of a composition, visually reinforcing transcendence and cosmic hierarchy. Flames, light, and stillness are recurring motifs.

Acintya is also depicted in wayang kulit (shadow puppet theatre) in both the Javanese and Balinese traditions. The Acintya puppet is typically distinguished by radiating flames and a frontal, immobile posture. In performance, Acintya does not function as a narrative character but serves as a symbolic presence representing ultimate reality, cosmic order, or the source of creation. Its appearance situates the drama within a broader metaphysical framework rather than advancing the plot.

== See also ==
- Sang Hyang Widhi Wasa
