= List of Hindu temples in Indonesia =

This is a list of Hindu temples and their remains in Indonesia. Indonesia has been part of Indosphere of Greater India where sanskritization and Hinduism spread across Indonesia. Hindus in Indonesia are a multi-ethnic society consisting of different Indonesian ethnicities, such as Balinese, Javanese, Indian and other ethnic groups. According to government statistics, the majority of Indonesian Hindus are Balinese that inhabit the island of Bali. This claim has been disputed by one of the leading Hindu bodies of the nation, the Parishada Hindu Dharma Indonesia (PHDI), which estimates there are about 18 million Hindus, indicating that most are not of Balinese origin. There is also a significant Indonesian Indian Hindu minority settled in large cities. Numbers of Indonesian natives that adhere to a form of native Austronesian ancestral and natural worship might also be categorized as Hindus, such as Dayak people (Kaharingan), Batak Karo (Parmalim), Javanese (Kejawen) and, Baduy people (Sunda Wiwitan). Hindu Dayak and Kaharingan groups are concentrated in Central Kalimantan.

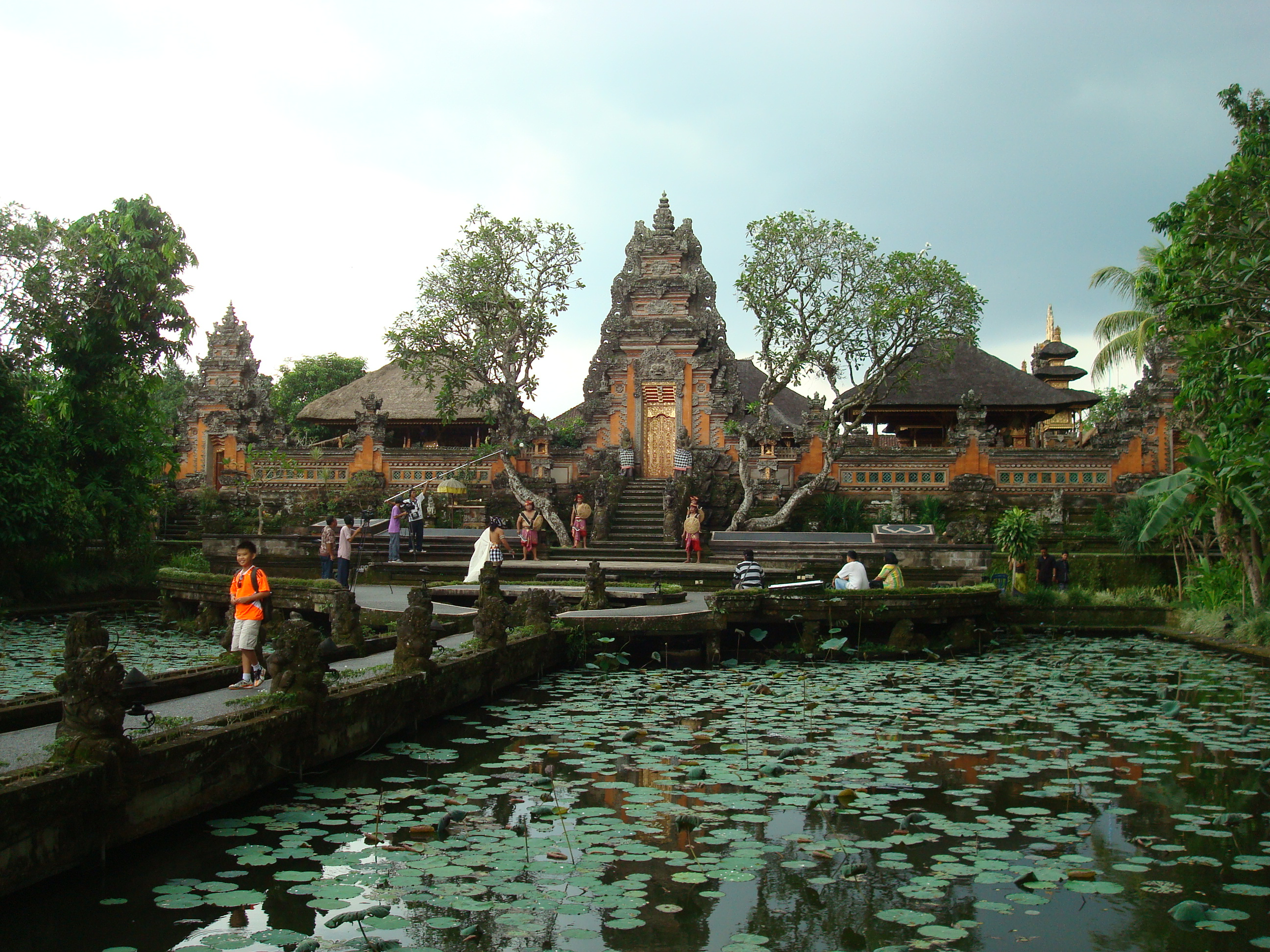
The gate of Balinese Hindu temple, Pura Taman Saraswati, dedicated to the goddess Sarasvati, Ubud, Bali

== Types ==
The design, style, layout, architecture and decoration of Hindu temples differ among various ethnic groups. In general, Indonesian Hindu temples are based on the Vasusastra-Manasara, a Hindu text on architecture, though they have significant native and Chinese influence. Balinese Hindu temples do not have the Gopuram above temples unlike Indian Tamil Hindu temples which feature a prominent Gopuram at the entrance. Indian temples are designed as indoor house of worship, while Balinese temples are designed as open-air temple within walled compound connected by series of intricately decorated roofed gates and split gates. In Indonesia, there are roughly three types of Hindu templesː

1. Candi, the Javanese ancient Hindu temples
2. Pura, the Balinese temples
3. Kuil or mandir, the Indian Hindu temples

== Candi ==
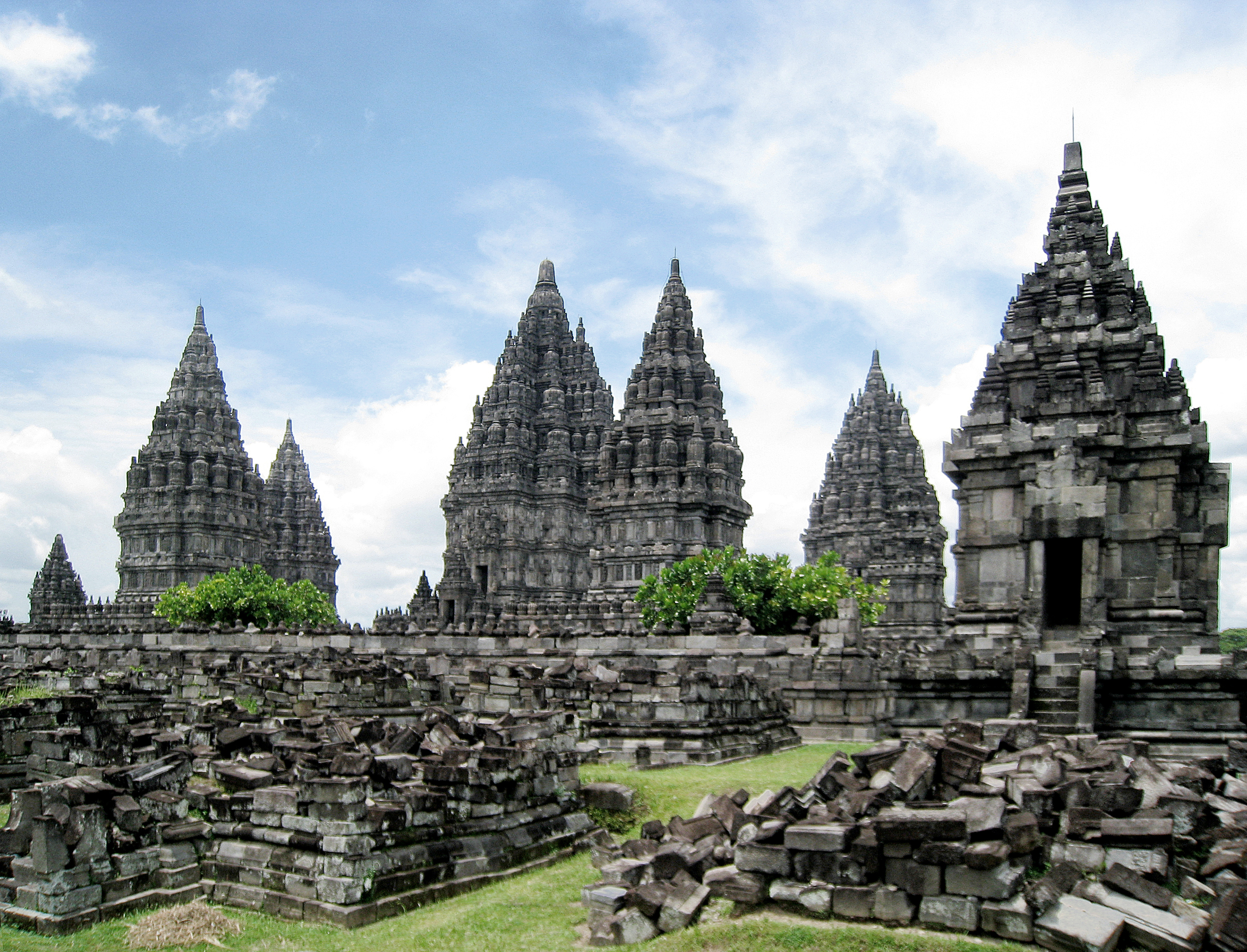
Prambanan, the largest Hindu temple compound in Indonesia.

Candi is an Indonesian term to refer to ancient temples, the word originated from the Sanskrit word Candikargha which is associated with the Goddess Durga. Prior to the rise of Islam, between the 5th to 15th century Dharmic faiths (Hinduism and Buddhism) were the majority in Indonesian archipelago, especially in Java and Sumatra. As the result numerous Hindu temples, locally known as candi, constructed and dominated the landscape of Java. According to local beliefs, Java had thousands of Hindu temples which co-existed with Buddhist temples, most of which were buried in massive eruption of Mount Merapi in 1006 AD.

Between 1100 and 1500 additional Hindu temples were built, but abandoned by Hindus and Buddhists as Islam spread in Java circa 15th to 16th century.

In last 200 years, some of these have been rediscovered mostly by farmers while preparing their lands for crops. Most of these ancient temples were rediscovered and reconstructed between 19th to 20th century, and treated as the important archaeological findings and also as tourist attraction, worship is mainly done on the national days by Balinese and local Hindu and Buddhist on sacred days such as Nyepi and Waisak In Indonesia. The local population mostly has converted to Islam or Christianity, but there are still also many worshipers who follow Kejawèn. Today, these ancient Hindu temples in Java are under the authority of Dinas Purbakala (Archaeological Authority) under the Ministry of Culture.

Majority of Hindu temples in Java were dedicated to Shiva, who Javanese Hindus considered as the God who commands the energy to destroy, recombine and recreate the cycle of life. Small temples were often dedicated to Shiva and his family (wife Durga, son Ganesha). Larger temple complexes include temples for Vishnu and Brahma, but the most majestic, sophisticated and central temple was dedicated to Shiva. The 732 AD Canggal inscription found in Southern Central Java, written in Indonesian Sanskrit script, eulogizes Shiva, calling him God par-excellence. Historical scripts suggest Javanese recognized amongst themselves three sects of Shiva - Mahesvara, Buddhist (Saugata) and Mahabrahmana (Rsi). The Hindu and Buddhist temples co-existed, people intermarried, with occasional couple featuring a Hindu king and Buddhist wife as evidenced by Candi Plaosan, the husband and wife maintaining their different religious beliefs after marriage. Most of the temples are laid out in perfect squares, with secondary temples or lingas arranged geometrically or circularly. However, midst of the perfect symmetries, is present a shift of the temple complex axis and primary statue enclosure axis; this asymmetry is believed to be deliberate because the shift is always to the north and the ratio of asymmetry is exactly the same in a dozen temples where this has been measured. Some of sculptures and reliefs in the temples represent Hindu dance forms, currently seen in India but not in Java. Some in temples Java have a mix of Hindu and Buddhist features which has made attribution and original purpose against later usage difficult to ascertain.

=== Central Java ===
Central Java region consist of modern Central Java and Yogyakarta provinces. Most of Hindu temples in Cantral Java region are candi or ancient temples built between 8th to 15th century. Some known Hindu temples in Java include:

- Candi Prambanan - the largest Hindu temples complex uncovered so far in Indonesia; it is also known as Loro Jonggrang, and it includes 240 temples; the three central temples have intricate carvings on its walls to pictorially describe all major events from the Hindu epic Ramayana. The temple is still used by local Hindu minority community as a place of worship on their special days of the year.
- Candi Ijo
- Candi Barong
- Candi Sambisari - located in village of Purwomartani (Kalasan), this temple is located below ground level, and is a perfect square of 13.65 x 13.65 meters and is 7 meters high; it is the most preserved and complete Hindu temple in Java from the late 9th century AD. The large linga and yoni inside the temple is made of andesite stone; the temple faces west and the yoni inside the temple faces north. The reliefs in the wall are well preserved and intricate. The temple is surrounded by a grid of 8 lingas in a precise symmetric arrangement. There is evidence that nearby farm fields are on top of walls and parts of this temple yet to be unearthed.
- Candi Kedulan
- Candi Gebang
- Candi Kimpulan
- Candi Gedong Songo - built in the early 8th century, on southern slopes of Gunung Ungaran overlooking central Java, by Wangsa Sanjaya dynasty
- Candi Pringapus situated in Temanggung
- Candi Losari situated in Magelang
- Candi Selogriyo - built in the 8th century, on slopes of Mount Sumbing overlooking rice terraces of Java
- Candi Gunung Wukir - built before 732 AD, dedicated to God Siwa, famous for the cangaal inscription discovered in one of its wells of secondary temple. It is located in Semin village (Salam). The temple's center still has yoni, but the linga is missing.
- Candi Morangan - built in the 9th century CE, with Siva's linga-yoni, has delicate carvings of tangled lovers and vegetation motifs on andesite stones; the temple is sometimes called fragrance-exuding temple
- Candi Gunung Sari - located in village of Gulon (Muntilan), this is a Siva temple with barong relief suggesting a syncretic fusion of Hindu and pre-Hindu Javanese ideas
- Candi Merak - a 10th-century Hindu temple, located east of Jogjakarta, like many other temples in Java has one main temple and three secondary temples with gupolo; the wall is carved with reliefs of Siwa's wife Durga, turtle, flowers and birds.
- Candi Dieng
- Candi Sukuh
- Candi Cetho

=== Eastern Java ===
- Candi Penataran
- Candi Jawi
- Candi Kidal
- Candi Singhasari
- Candi Surawana
- Candi Jago
- Candi Bajang Ratu
- Candi Macan Putih

=== Western Java ===
- Candi Cangkuang
- Candi Bojongmenje

=== Bali ===
- Candi Gunung Kawi
- Candi Tebing Kerobokan
- Goa Garba
- Candi Tebing Kelebutan
- Goa Gajah
- Candi Tebing Tegallinggah
- Candi Tebing Jukut Paku
- Relief Yeh Pulu

== Pura ==
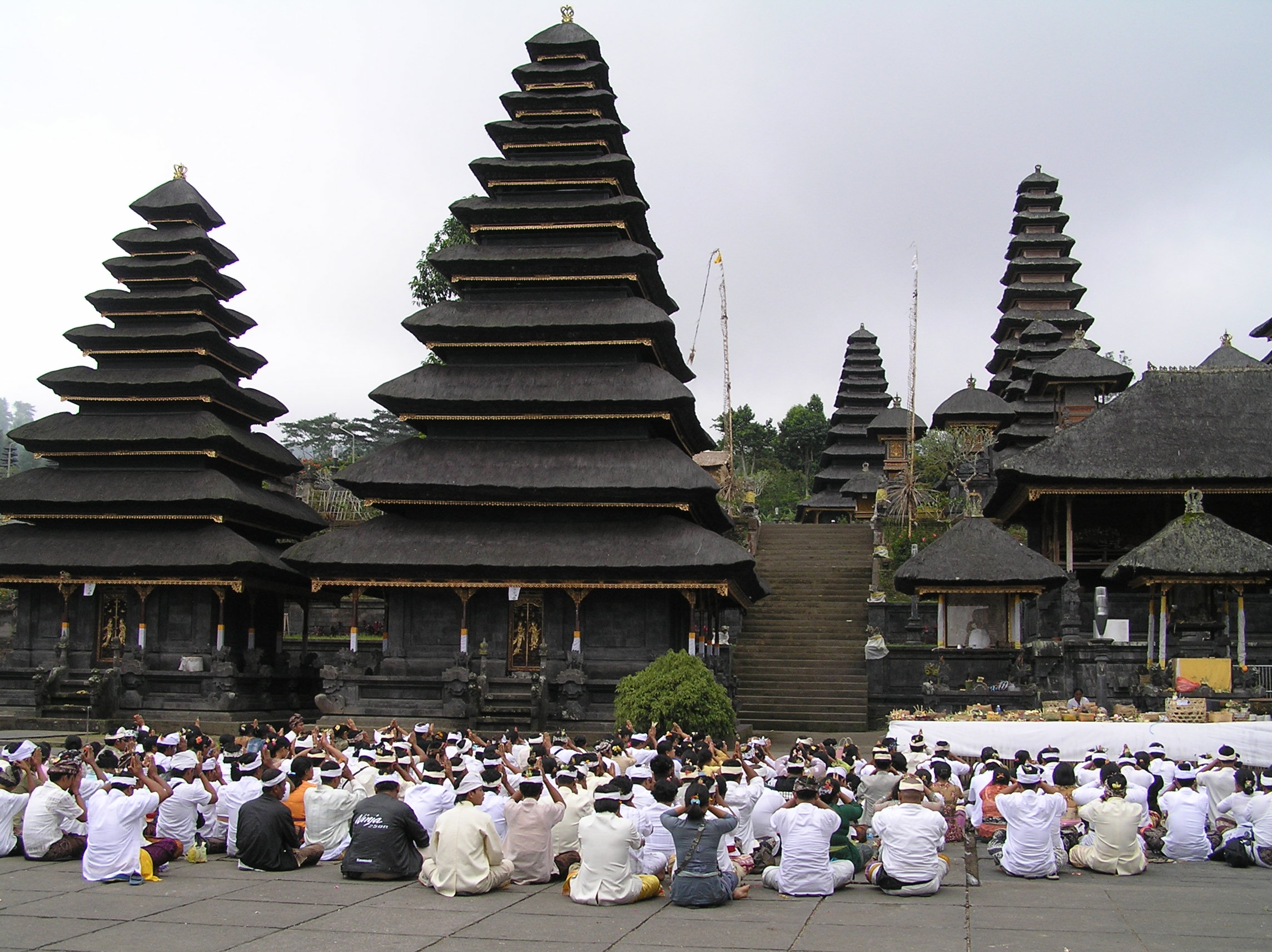
Mother temple Besakih, the largest Balinese Hindu temple in Indonesia

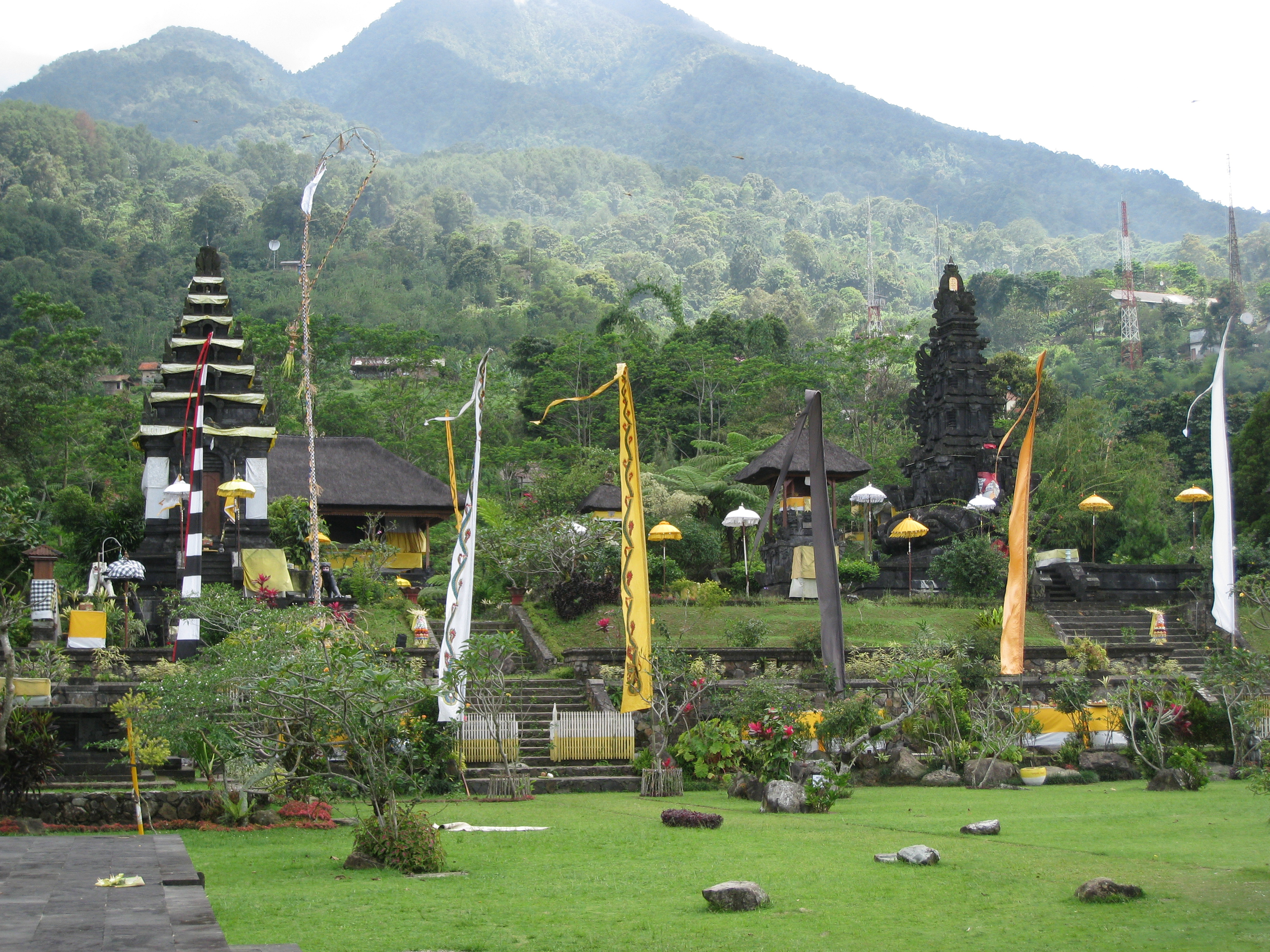
Pura Parahyangan Agung Jagatkarta in Bogor, West Java

Pura is Balinese Hindu temples. Balinese Hinduism is the continuation of Javanese Hindu Dharmic tradition developed in Java between the 8th to 15th century. After Islam toppled Hinduism in Java circa 15th century, the remnants of this ancient Indonesian Hinduism are confined in Bali. Balinese Hinduism incorporate native Austronesian and Hindu worship of ancestors batara-s in Balinese from Sanskrit pitr-s) next to the general ideas from Hinduism of Vedic deities, terms and rituals imported from India. In Bali, a Pura (Balinese temple) is designed as an open-air worship place within a walled compound. The compound walls have a series of intricately decorated gates without doors for the devotee to enter. The design, plan and layout of the holy pura follows a square layout.

Today, Balinese Hindus are concentrated in Bali island and some other cities in Indonesia. In Bali, Hindu Balinese temples (Pura) can be found quite easily, since they are the majority in the island. Outside Bali, they can be found too but not too many, for mostly these temples were followed the migration and only to accommodate Balinese people outside Bali, such as Balinese temples in Greater Jakarta.

=== Bali ===
- Pura Besakih, Karangasem Regency (the largest Balinese Hindu temple in Indonesia)
- Pura Ulun Danu Bratan
- Pura Luhur Ulu Watu
- Pura Kehen, southern slope of Bangli hill
- Pura Makori, Bali
- Pura Ulun Danu Batur, Karanganyar Batur village, Kintamani
- Pura Watukaru, Wangaya Gede village, Tabanan
- Pura Puncak Penulisan, Kintamani
- Pura Pancering Jagat, Trunyan village, Kintamani
- Pura Jagadnatha, Jalan Mayor Wisnu, Puputan Square
- Pura Maospahit Denpasar, Banjar Gerenceng
- Pura Tanah Lot, Marga
- Pura Goa Lawah
- Pura Tirtha Empul
- Pura Sakenan, Klungkung Regency
- Pura Taman Ayun
- Pura Taman Saraswati, Ubud
- Pura Pengerebongan, Kesiman, Denpasar
- Pura Bolo, Tegallalang, Gianyar
- Pura Khayangan Jagat Masceti, Medahan Keramas, Gianyar
- Pura Penataran Sasih, Pejeng village, Gianyar
- Pura Griya Sakti Manuaba

=== Nusa Tenggara ===
- Pura Lingsar, Narmada, Lombok, West Nusa Tenggara
- Pura Watugunung, Bima, West Nusa Tenggara
- Pura Agung Girinatha, Sumbawa Besar, West Nusa Tenggara
- Pura Agung Waidoko, Maumere, East Nusa Tenggara
- Pura Agung Giri Kertabhuana, Kupang, East Nusa Tenggara
- Pura Agung Oebanantha, Kupang, East Nusa Tenggara
- Pura Dalem Kahyangan Wolowona, Ende, East Nusa Tenggara
- Pura Atambuanantha, Atambua, East Nusa Tenggara

=== Eastern Java ===
- Pura Agung Jagat Karana, Surabaya
- Pura Tirta Wening, Tambak Sari, Surabaya
- Pura Ranu Ngudisari, Tlagan hamlet, Pohjejer village, Gondang subdistrict, Mojokerto Regency
- Pura Luhur Poten, Mount Bromo, Probolinggo Regency

=== Central Java ===
- Pura Agung Giri Natha, Jalan Sumbing No. 12, Semarang
- Pura Wira Buwana, Jalan Jendral Sarwo Edi Wibowo, Kompleks Akademi Militer, Magelang
- Pura Jagatnatha, Banguntapan (Janti), Yogyakarta
- Pura Bhakti Widhi, Jalan Ngawen, Km. 2.5, Beji, Ngawen, Gunung Kidul
- Pura Pita Maha, Karanganom, Klaten Utara, Klaten
- Pura Indra Prasta, Mutihan, Sondakan, Lawean, Surakarta
- Pura Caraka Dewa, Marga Padang, Tarub, Tegal.
- Pura Segara Suci, Panggung, Tegal.

=== Western Java ===
- Pura Parahyangan Agung Jagatkarta, Taman Sari, Bogor Regency - the second largest Balinese Hindu temple in Indonesia.
- Pura Giri Kusuma, Bogor
- Pura Penataran Agung Sangga Bhuwana, Karawang
- Pura Agung Wira Loka Natha, Cimahi
- Pura Wira Satya Dharma, Ujung Berung Bandung
- Pura Satya Akasa, Margahayu, Bandung
- Pura Agung Jati Pramana, Cirebon
- Pura Eka Wira Anantha Taman, Serang
- Pura Aditya Dharmesti, Tangerang
- Pura Dharma Sidhi, Tangerang
- Pura Parahyangan Jagat Guru, Tangerang
- Padmasana Agung Bhuana Angkasa, Tangerang

=== Northern Sumatra ===
- Pura Agung Raksa Bhuana, Jalan Polonia 216, Medan
- Pura Jagadhita Toba, Jalan Toba 21118, Pematang Siantar

=== Southern Sumatra ===
- Pura Penataran Agung Sriwijaya, Jalan Seduduk Putih No.19, Kecamatan Ilir Timur II, Palembang

== Kovil ==
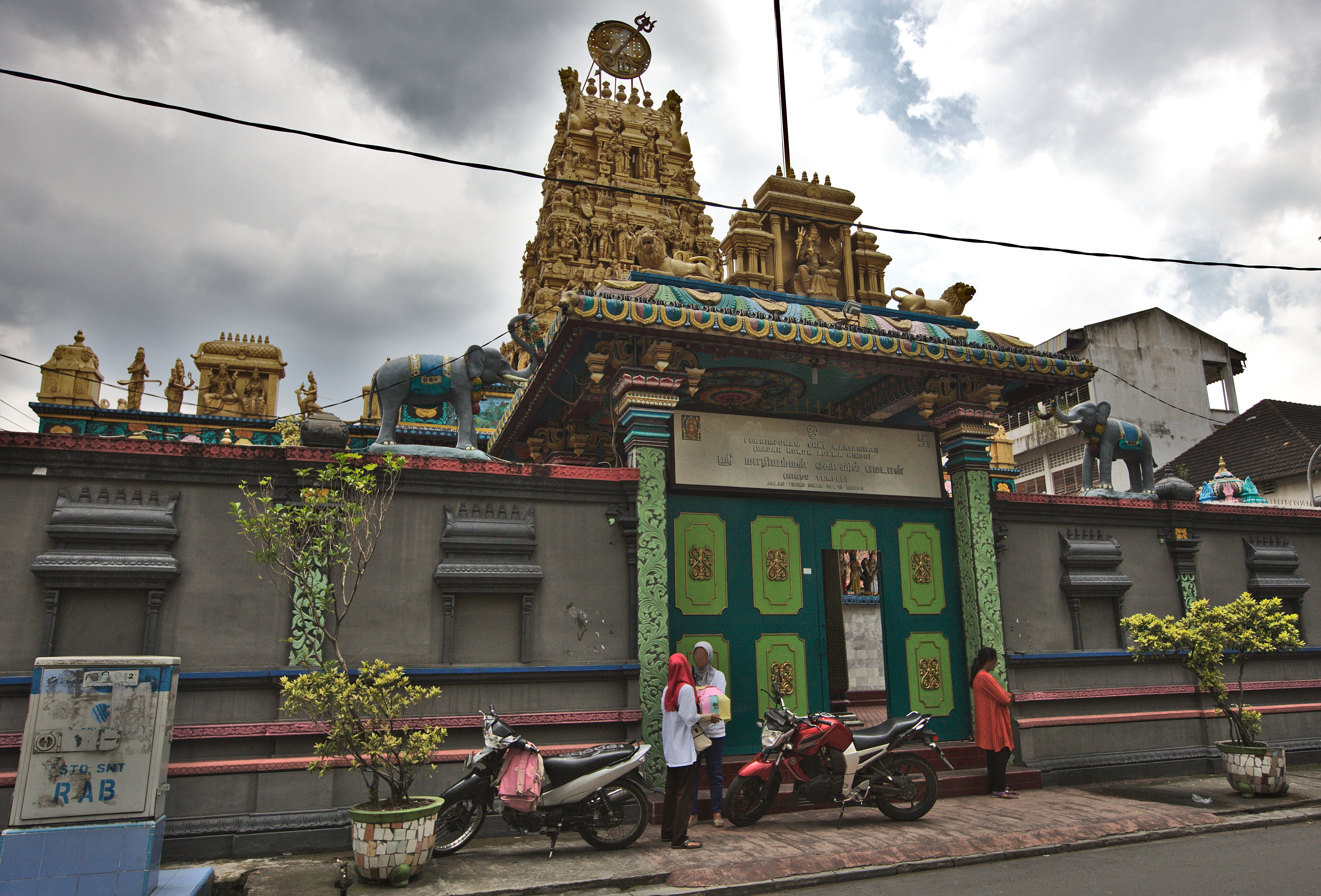
Shri Mariamman Indian Hindu Temple in Medan

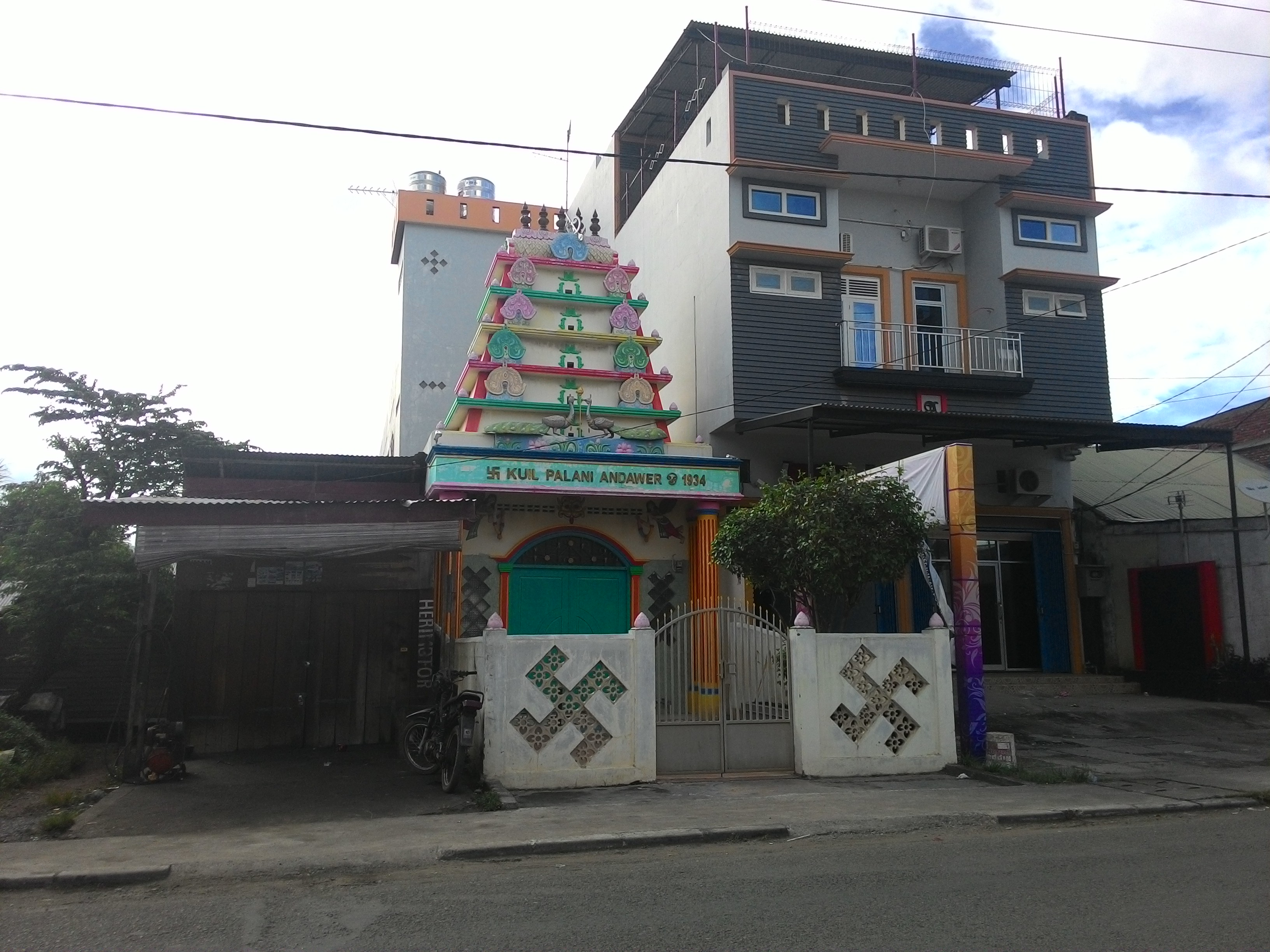
Hindu Temple in Banda Aceh

Kovil or koil (kuil in Indonesian) are used to refer Indian Hindu temples. Because of the influx of Indian immigrants into Indonesia back in the 19th century, there are numbers of Indian-style temples erected in Indonesian cities, especially in Medan and Jakarta. The Indian Hindu temples in Indonesia followed closely the design, style, layout and architecture commonly found in India and neighboring Malaysia and Singapore. Tamil Hindus are most concentrated in Medan, North Sumatra. There are around 40 Hindu temples in Medan and nearby but only a few Balinese Hindu temples in North Sumatra. Balaji Venkateshvara Temple (Pasar IV Padang Bulan, Medan) is developed by Tamils. Punjabis are mostly Sikh and Hindu. Most of them mixed these religions and some of them can speak Punjabi. Sindhi peoples are concentrated in Jakarta and usually open textile and garment business. There are around 12 Gurudvaras in Indonesia.

=== Northern Sumatra ===
- Shri Sithi Vinayagar Kovil, Karang Sari, Polonia Medan
- Shri Balaji Venkateshwara Kovil, Jln.Bunga Wijaya Kesuma/Pasar IV, Padang Bulan, Medan
- Sri Mariamman Temple, Jalan Teuku Umar, Kampung Madras, Medan
- Thandayuthapani Temple, Medan
- Shri Kaliamman Kovil, Jalan Zainul Arifin, Medan
- Maha Muniswarar Kovil, Medan
- Arulmigu Shri Maha Mariamman Kovil, Sampali
- Shri Thendayudhabani Kovil, Jln.Sultan Hasanuddin, Lubuk Pakam
- Shri Subramaniam Nagarattar kovil (Chettiar Kuil), Jalan Kejaksaan, Kebun Bunga, Medan
- Shri Maha Shiva Shakti Kovill, Karang Sari, Medan
- Shri Mariamman Kovil, Medan Helvetia
- Shri Singgama Kali Kovil, Jalan Karya, Medan Barat
- Shri Kaliamman Kovil, Jalan Karya, Medan Barat - right next to Vihara Manggala
- Shri Mariamman Kovil, Bekala, Medan Simalingkar B
- Shri Rajarajeshvari Amman Kovil, Selesai, Binjai Barat
- Shri Karrupa Veera Vigneswara Kovil Jalan Starban No.86 Medan Polonia
- Shri Hanuman Kovil Jl.Teratai Ujung Karang Sari Polonia Medan
- Shree Murugan Temple, Jalan Hamka, Kisaran, Asahan
- Shri Thendayuthabani Kovil, Lubuk Pakam, Deli Serdang
- Shri Singgama Kali Koil, Jl Prof M Yamin, Tebing Tinggi

=== Greater Jakarta ===
- Sri Siva Temple, Pluit, North Jakarta
- Shri Bathra Kaliamman Kovil, Komplek Perumahan Puri Metropolitan, Jalan Krisan Asri V, Blok B3, No. 20-22, Gondrong Petir, Cipondoh - Tangerang
- Ambe Mata Kovil, Graha Essar steel, BFI Estate Industri 3 Area Kav. B1, Cibitung, Bekasi - 17520
- Jai Kalimaa Kovil, Jalan Agung Barat 35 Blok B/36 no. 13 Sunter, Jakarta
- Shri Sanathana Dharma Aalayam - Murugan Kovil, Kalideres, Jakarta

=== Banda Aceh ===
- Kuil Palani Andawer, Kampung Kedah, Kutaraja, Banda Aceh

== Indonesian Hindu Temples outside the country ==
Compared to Indian Hindu temples, there are relatively few Hindu temples of Indonesian architecture outside the country. They are as follows:

- Pura Girinatha, Dili, East Timor
- Pura Tri Hita Karana (located in Erholungspark Marzahn, Berlin, Germany)
- A padmasana exists in Hamburg, Germany in front of the Museum of Ethnology, Hamburg.
- Two Balinese Temples exist in the Pairi Daiza botanical garden in Belgium.

== See also ==
- Buddhism in Southeast Asia
- Candi of Indonesia
- Hinduism in Java
- Hinduism in Southeast Asia
- Indonesian Esoteric Buddhism
- Indosphere
- List of Buddhist temples
- Lists of Hindu temples
