= Bale kulkul =

Balinese pavilion

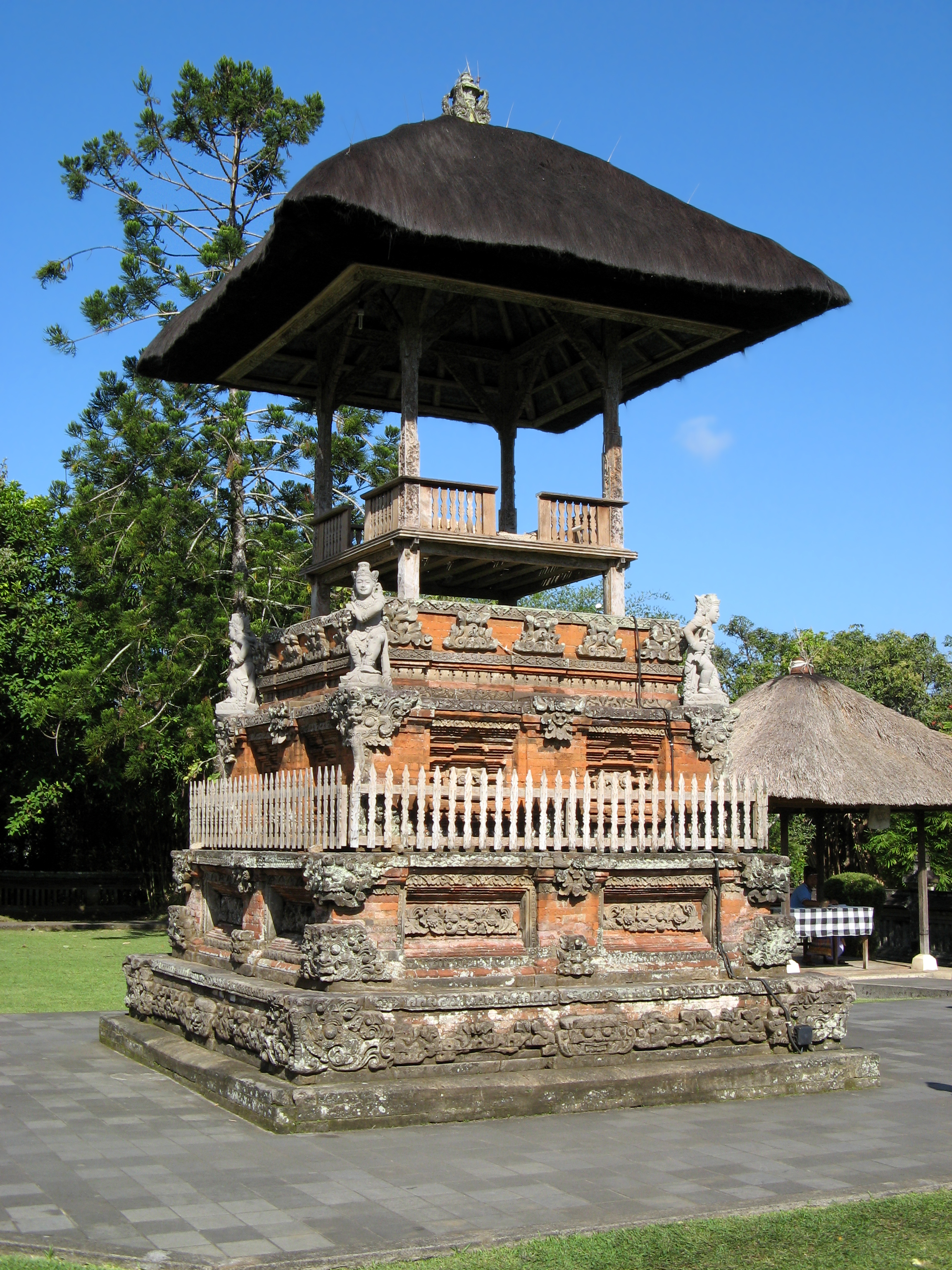
Bale kulkul in Pura Taman Ayun, Mengwi subdistrict, Bali.

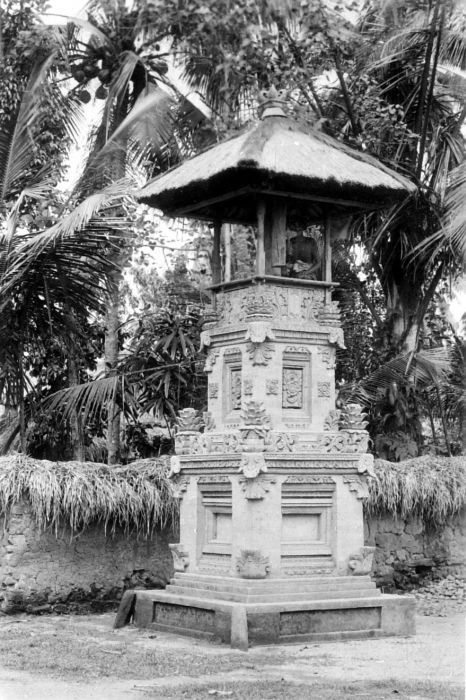
A simple bale kulkul.

The bale kulkul or bale kul-kul (Balinese "drum pavilion") is a Balinese pavilion where a slit-log drum (Balinese kulkul) is placed. It is essentially a drum tower or a watch tower. A bale kulkul can has a civic function, such as those used in villages as a mean of communication; or for religious function, an integral part of Balinese temple architecture.

== Structure ==
Bale kulkul is a watchtower-like structure. It consists of a base topped with a wooden structure where the kulkul is hanged. A roof canopy provides shelter for the kulkul. The kulkul itself is basically a slit drum: a percussive device consisting of a hollow piece of timber with a slit in one side, a common device in Southeast Asia. Different rhythms indicate the particular reason for the summons, for example, a meeting of household heads at the bale agung ("great pavilion", a pavilion for the congregation), a wedding, death of a person, etc. In the past, the kulkul was also sounded as a call to arms. A bale kulkul varies in design according to the wealth of the builder.

There are many kinds of bale kulkul. A bale kulkul used for civic function is usually found in Balinese villages (banjar). The kulkul of this kind of bale kulkul is known as Kulkul Manusia ("kulkul of human"). Kulkul Manusia can be constructed of any type of wood, usually teak wood or wood of a jackfruit tree. In its simplest construction, this bale kulkul consists of a plinth-base of hardened earth, topped with a wooden structure which provides the height, topped with a pavilion where the kulkul is kept. In a village, this bale kulkul is built in a strategic area where the villagers can be summoned.

In Balinese temples, the bale kulkul usually found straddling onto a wall corner. It is usually constructed of masonry structure and heavily decorated with mythic figures. The base of a temple bale kulkul reaches significant height, and is divided into three levels from bottom to top: tepas, batur, and sari. The tepas level represents the underworld realm bhur (Sanskrit bhurloka) and is decorated with figures of giant creatures. The batur level represents the realm of the human bhuwah (Sanskrit bhuvarloka) and is decorated with animals. The sari level represents the realm of gods swah (Sanskrit svarloka) and is decorated with birds and other celestial figures. On top of the swah level is the wooden pavilion where the kulkul is kept. A large bale kulkul in Mengwi subdistrict is constructed of ochre-colored brickwork with paras stone ornamentation and decorated with mythic figures such as the head of Bhoma, celestial goddesses, and lion-like effigies. There are two kinds of kulkul the temple's bale kulkul, Kulkul Dewa ("kulkul of the gods") and Kulkul Bhuta ("kulkul of the bhutas"). Kulkul Dewa is always made of the wood of jackfruit tree and is struck in a very slow rhythm to call the gods. Kulkul bhuta is made of bamboo and is struck to summon the Bhuta kala (demons).

The pavilion where the kulkul is hanged is usually a four-posted wooden structure topped with a pyramidal-shaped roof. Larger temple bale kulkul has the roof of its pavilion supported with eight posts, which supports two layers of roof. The frame is usually of timber. The roof can be of a thatched material or of clay pantiles. The top of the roof may be decorated with a kemuncak finial.

== History and evolution ==
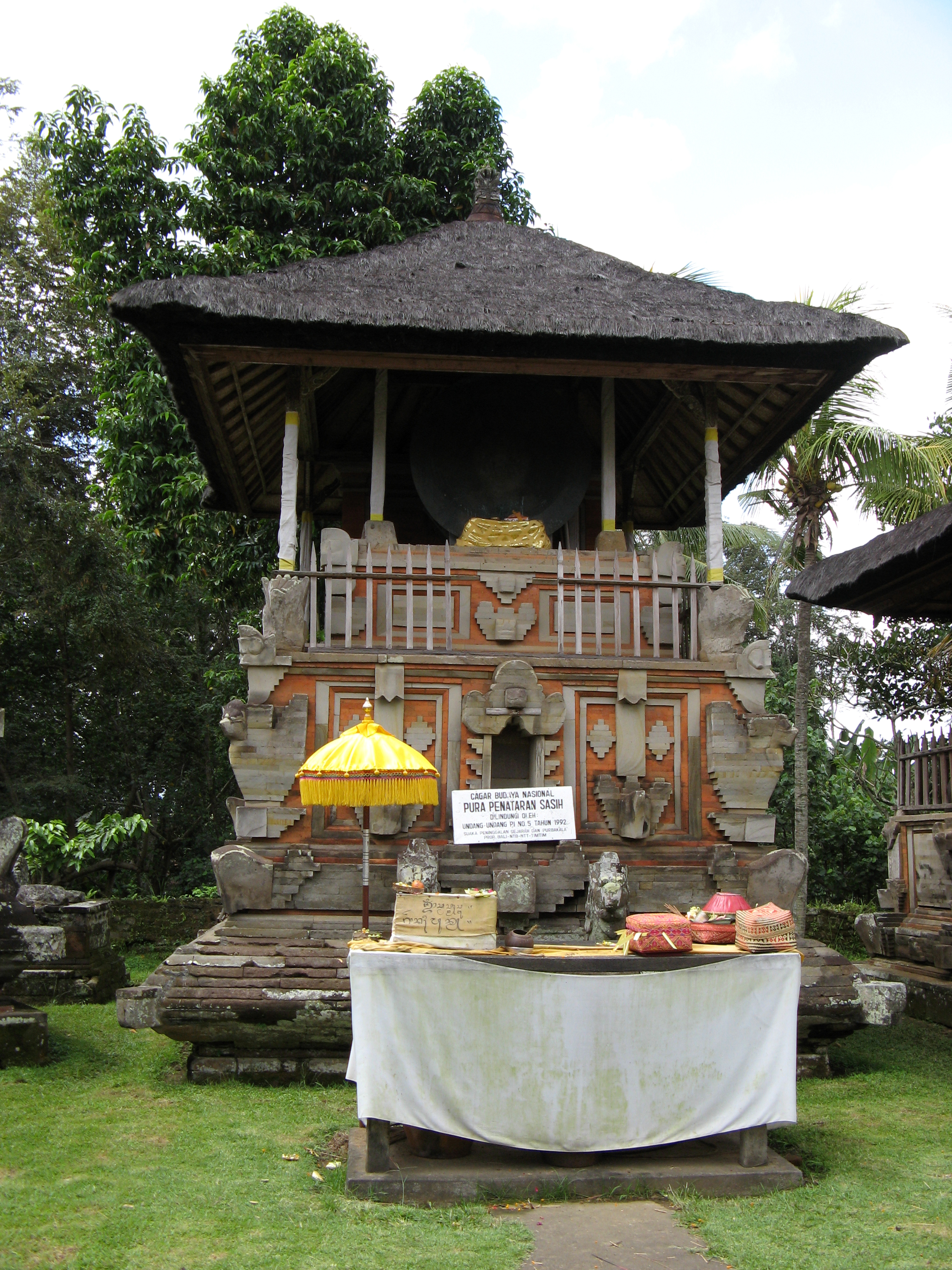
The bale kulkul of Pura Penataran Sasih in Pejeng village, Bali, contains the world's largest bronze drum cast in a single piece.

Bale kulkul is an ancient architectural feature of Indonesia, predating the arrival of Hinduism in Indonesia. A bale kulkul at the Pura Penataran Sasih at Pejeng village contains an approximately 2,000 years-old bronze drum, the Moon of Pejeng. The Moon of Pejeng is the world's largest and most complete type of drum known as the Pejeng type drums which have been found in Bali and Java. This suggests that these towers were kept alive throughout the Hindu-Buddhist period and persisting in the Islamic era of Indonesian civilization.

With the arrival of Islam in Indonesia in Java, a bale kulkul-like structure in 15th-century Java was still used as a sign to congregate villagers, but this time as a call for prayer. The Menara Kudus Mosque in the city of Kudus, Central Java contains a bale kulkul-like structure that is used as a mean to call for prayer. Unlike the Middle Eastern minaret, the "minaret" of the Menara Kudus Mosque is topped with a drum called bedug. The minaret of the Menara Kudus Mosque is currently the only structure of this type, but it may be more widespread in the past.

In modern time, the structural form of bale kulkul is used for different function, such as security post. Generator room, lift shaft, garage, water tower, and storage may imitate the traditional bale kulkul.

== See also ==
- Balinese architecture
- Balinese traditional house

== Cited works ==
- Budi A. Sukada (1998). Gunawan Tjahjono (ed.). Architecture. Indonesian Heritage. Vol. 6. Singapore: Archipelago Press. ISBN 9813018305.
- Davison, Julian (2003). Balinese architecture. Singapore: Tuttle Publishing. ISBN 9780794600716.
- Saraswati, A.A. Ayu Oka (2006). "BALE KULKUL SEBAGAI BANGUNAN PENANDA PENDUKUNG KARAKTER KOTA BUDAYA" [Bale Kulkul As A Building Which Support The City's Cultural Character]. DIMENSI Journal of Architecture and Built Environment (in Indonesian). 34 (1). eISSN 2338-7858. ISSN 0126-219X. Archived from the original on November 18, 2016.
- Simao, M. Renee (October 6, 2008). "Indonesia's Mysterious Moon of Pejeng". Bearings. Wordpress. Archived from the original on November 18, 2016.
