= Pura Griya Sakti =

Balinese Hindu temple in Indonesia

Coordinates: 8°26′49″S 115°17′24″E

Pura Griya Sakti is a Balinese Hindu temple located in the village of Manuaba, Kenderan administrative village, Tegalalang subdistrict, Gianyar Regency, Bali. The district is known for its woodcarving and its terraced rice field. The small village of Manuaba is about 4 km north of Kenderan or about 2.5 km southwest of the town of Tampaksiring with its famed Gunung Kawi temple. Pura Griya Sakti is the main temple of a powerful Brahman caste in the area.

== History ==
Pura Griya Sakti was founded by Pedanda Manuaba in the 17th century. Pedanda Manuaba is the grandson of Pedanda Sakti Wau Rauh (Pedanda Nirartha) who is considered to be the first brahman to arrived in Bali from Java after the fall of the Majapahit Empire. Nirartha arrived in Bali during the days of King Batu-Renggong of Gelgel ca. 1550. Nirartha traveled throughout Bali to consolidate and revitalize the Hindu religion which had fallen into an anarchical state. HE eventually settled in Mas and married the daughter of a local prince. In 1589 he was appointed royal councilor and high priest to the king of Gelgel. He used this position to consolidate the power of the brahmans.

The ancient temple was renovated in the late 1990s with new temple wall encircling the temple complex and the wantilan, and a couple of new candi bentar gateways. The wantilan is also restored during the refurbishment.

== Temple layout ==
The temple compound is built over a hilly outcrop. The temple is aligned north-south, with the north part being the highest part of the temple. It is divided into three areas: the outer sanctum of the temple (jaba pisan or nistaning mandala), the middle sanctum (jaba tengah or madya mandala), and the inner main sanctum (jero or utamaning mandala). The most sacred part of the temple compound, the jero, is located on the highest, northernmost, point of the temple complex. At the lowest level of the temple to the south is a large wantilan where general meetings and activities such as the ritual cockfight are enacted. Steps leads to the upper level of the outer sanctum. On the upper level, there are two pairs of bale gong ("gong pavilion") where the gamelans are stored. A highly ornate bale kulkul (slit-drum tower) is located in this area close to the street. The bale kulkul is used to make announcement. A large tree grew at the steps leading to the outer sanctum. This tree is also a shrine dedicated to Ratu Gede Macan, spirit of a tiger.

The outer sanctum is connected to the middle sanctum via another steps, a candi bentar gateway marks the entrance into the middle sanctum. The middle sanctum contains several pavilion mainly to support the ritual process in the inner sanctum. The Gedong Sinub Wastra is a storage shed for offering paraphernalia. A piasan pedanda is a small pavilion used by the priest to make their offerings, and an additional storage. A kitchen is also located in the middle sanctum.

The inner sanctum can be reached from the middle sanctum after climbing steps and passing another candi bentar gateway. The inner sanctum is the most sacred area of the temple where the main shrine is located. The main shrine took form of a pelinggih gedong, a pavilion-like shrine building dedicated to the spirit of Pedanda Manuaba, the founder of the temple. This shrine is dominated with a huge and intertwining banyan tree on its background. To the side of the main shrine is the padmasana, a shrine which took form of a miniature shrine dedicated for the supreme god. There are a couple of pavilions on the inner sanctum used for storage. The pesantian pavilion is used for religious chanting. The Pewedaan Pemangku is a pavilion set aside for priests. The inner sanctum is normally off-limit to visitors, but it is possible to ask permission to the temple priest.

== See also ==
- Balinese temple

== Cited works ==
- Auger, Timothy, ed. (2001). Bali & Lombok. Eyewitness Travel Guides. London: Dorling Kindersley. ISBN 0751368709.
- Stuart-Fox, David (1999). Fox, James J. (ed.). Religion and Ritual: Balinese Hindu Temples. Indonesian Heritage. Singapore: Archipelago Press. ISBN 9813018585.
