= Melukat =

Traditional ceremony in Bali

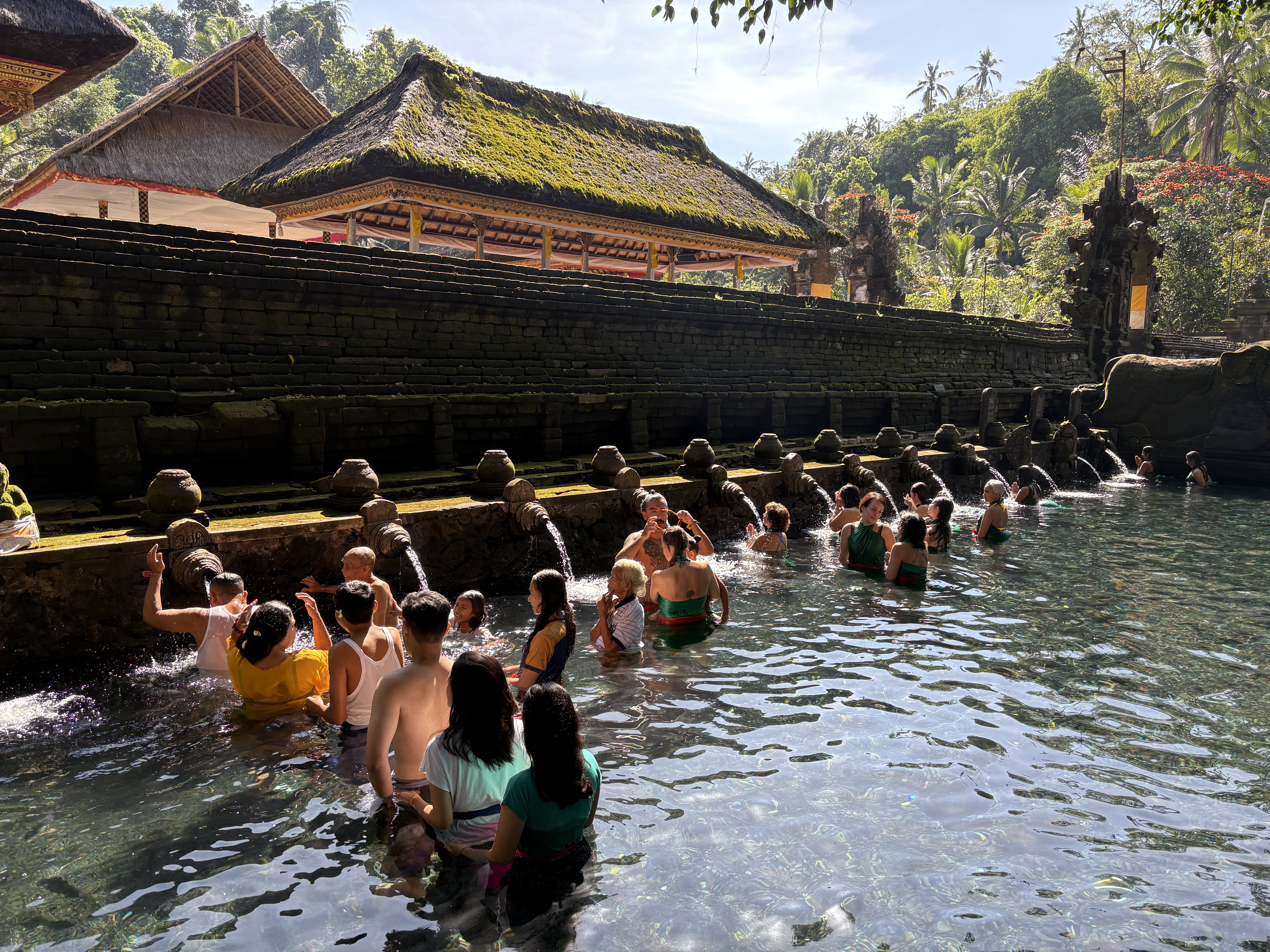
Melukat at the Pura Tirta Empul

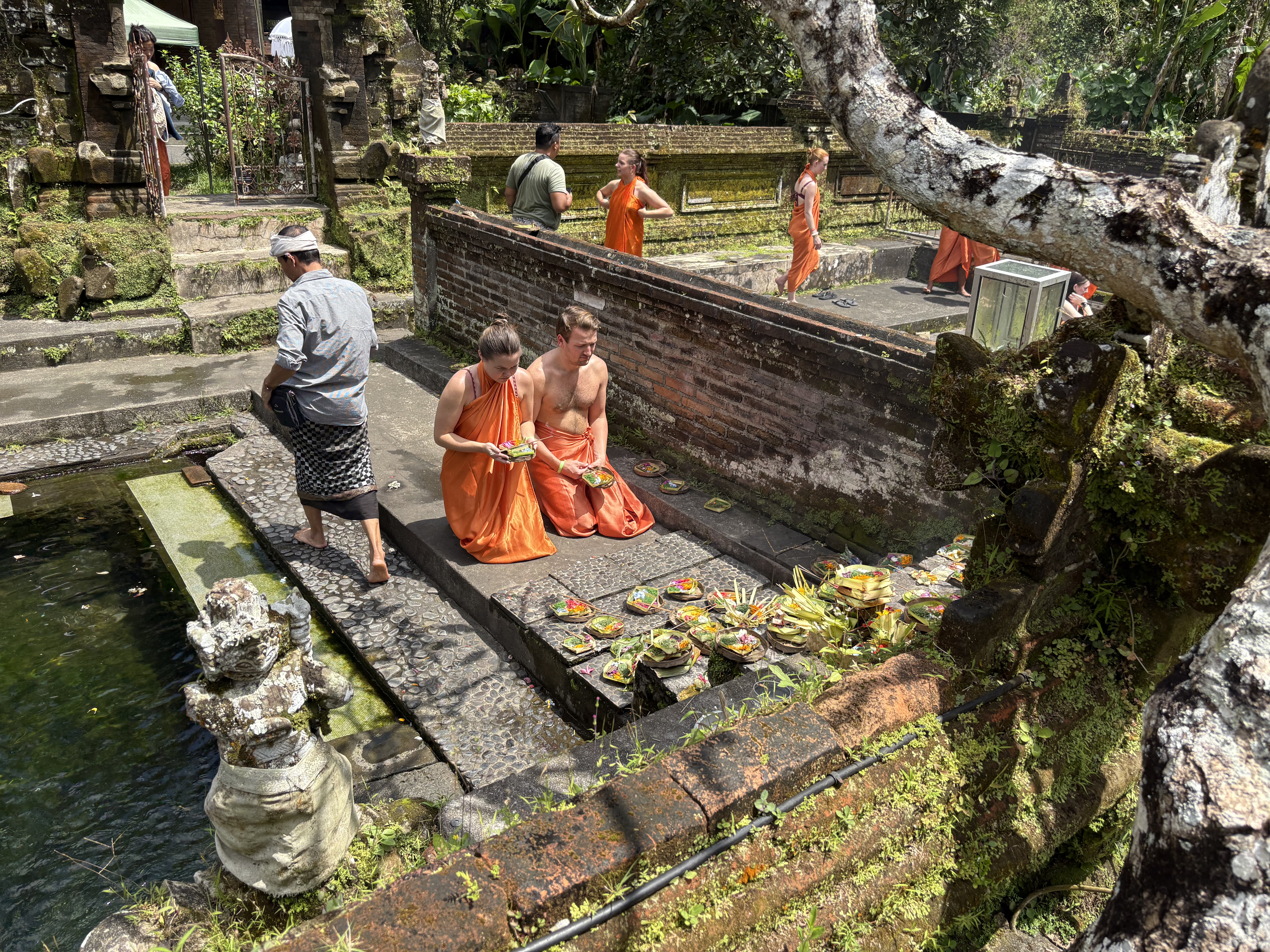
A pair of visitors offering offerings prior to the Melukat at Pura Gunung Kawi Sebatu

Melukat is a cleansing ritual of the mind, body, and spirit using water practiced in Bali, Indonesia. This ceremony has been passed down through generations among the Hindu community to the present day. Spiritual purification in this context means eliminating impurities within oneself. The term Melukat is derived from the Old Javanese words lukat meaning "purification". The Melukat ceremony is led by a priest and involves offerings such as prascita and bayuan, prepared with accompanying mantras. The individual to be purified is first subjected to mantras by the priest. After the mantra process is completed, the person is bathed with coconut water. Following the coconut water bath, the ritual continues with immersion in a lake, river, sea, or a bathing place believed to bring blessings. This ceremony is typically performed during Hindu religious days, such as Purnama, Tilem, and Kajeng Kliwon. Melukat ceremonies are often conducted collectively, such as by schools, offices, government bodies, or local communities. The ceremonies take place at historical sites, temples, bathing places, beaches, rivers, and the sea in Bali. The ritual can be found in several places such as Tirta Empul Temple, Mengening Temple, Gunung Kawi Sebatu Temple, Campuhan Windhu Segara Temple, Sebatu Holy Spring Temple, Tirtha Sudamala Temple, Saraswati Temple in Ubud, and Goa Giri Putri Temple in Nusa Penida. Tirta Empul Temple is arguably considered the most renowned location for the ritual. The ritual has since become a tourist attraction.
