= Shri Sanathana Dharma Aalayam =

Indian Hindu temple in Jakarta, Indonesia

Coordinates: 6.146976°S 106.70818°E

Shri Sanathana Dharma Aalayam Jakarta Murugan Temple Kuil Sri Sanatana Dharma ஸ்ரீ சனாதன தர்ம ஆலயம்ஸ்

Religion
- Affiliation: Hinduism
- District: Kalideres
- Deity: Murugan
- Festival: Thaipusam

Location
- Location: Jalan Bedugul
- State: Jakarta
- Country: Indonesia
- Interactive map of Shri Sanathana Dharma Aalayam; Jakarta Murugan Temple; Kuil Sri Sanatana Dharma ஸ்ரீ சனாதன தர்ம ஆலயம்ஸ்

Architecture
- Type: Dravidian
- Creator: DPP Gema Sadhana
- Completed: 2025

Website
- https://jktmurugantemple.org/

Shri Sanathana Dharma Aalayam, or also known as Jakarta Murugan Temple is a kovil (Indian Hindu temple) located at Kalideres district of West Jakarta, Indonesia. As planned, it is the first Dravidian (Indian) Hindu temple in Jakarta, as representation of Indian Indonesians who practice Indian Hinduism (as opposed to Balinese Hinduism).

The temple is built on an area of 4,000 square meters, and also open to public as a tourist destination. Not only place of worship, there are parks and multipurpose rooms for the public, especially for local residents. On February 2 2025, the temple was opened to the public

== History ==
In 2019, a proposal for the temple's construction was submitted to the Indonesian government and approved the same year. The temple's construction was supported by the Jakarta under the leadership of Governor Anies Baswedan, who presided over the groundbreaking ceremony on February 14, 2020. The ceremony was also attended by the Ambassador of India to Indonesia. Due to the covid pandemic and restrictions, the temple's construction was postponed and resumed in 2022.

The Mahakumbhabhishekam and the temple's inauguration took place on February 2, 2025. The Ministry of Religious Affairs, Nasaruddin Umar inaugurated the temple. The grand opening ceremony was also attended by Ministry of Foreign Affairs, Sugiono and Ministry of Forestry, Raja Juli Antoni. In a pre-recorded video message, Prime Minister of India Narendra Modi spoke of India's special relationship with Indonesia that has existed for centuries. Two elephants from Taman Safari Indonesia were also used in the temple's purification ceremony, which is an important symbol for Hindus.

== Architecture ==
The temple serves all sects of Hinduism, including Shaivism and Vaishnavism. Among its prominent features are sacred icons of Kartikeya, Ganesha, Sakti, Siwa, Parvati, and other revered deities. The towering Rajagopuram, standing 131 feet tall, symbolizes divine grace, while the 69-foot-tall statue of Lord Murugan represents spiritual ascension.

The temple also features a multipurpose hall for community events, a museum highlighting the cultural ties between Indonesia and India, and tranquil gardens ideal for meditation and reflection. The temple's design blends Indian, Balinese, and Javanese traditions, emphasizing the values of Pancasila.

== See also ==
- Hindu temples in Indonesia
