= Pura Maospahit =

Balinese Hindu temple in Indonesia

- ᬧᬸᬭᬫᬳᭀᬲ᭄ᬧᬳᬶᬢ᭄
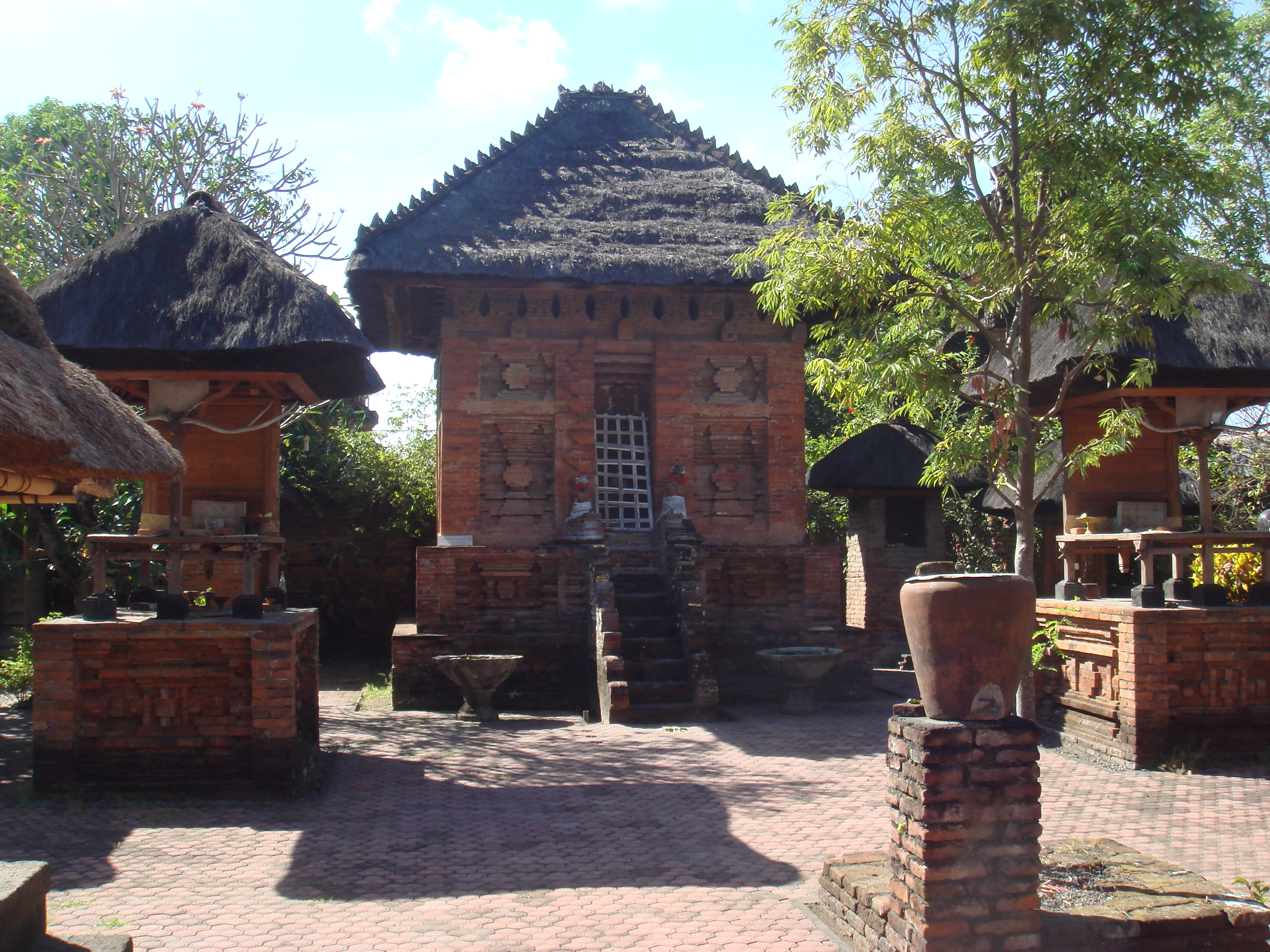
- The 13th-century main shrine of Pura Maospahit, the first building to be built in the temple complex.
- Interactive map of the Pura Maospahit area

General information
- Type: Pura
- Architectural style: Balinese
- Location: Denpasar, Indonesia, Jl. Sutomo No.6, Pemecutan Kaja, Denpasar Utara, Kota Denpasar, Bali 80231, Indonesia
- Coordinates: 8°39′14″S 115°12′36″E
- Estimated completion: 1278

Design and construction
- Architect: Sri Kbo Iwa

Pura Maospahit (Balinese script: ᬧᬸᬭᬫᬳᭀᬲ᭄ᬧᬳᬶᬢ᭄) is a Balinese Hindu temple or pura located in Denpasar, Bali. The pura is known for its bare red brick architecture, reminiscent of the architecture of the 13th-century Majapahit Kingdom, hence the name. Pura Maospahit is the only pura in Bali which was built using a concept known as Panca Mandala where the most sacred area is situated at the center instead of at the direction of the mountain.

== History ==
The history of Pura Maospahit is recorded in the Babad Wongayah Dalem, a stone inscription mentioning the story of Sri Kbo Iwa, an architect of Balinese religious architecture. Sri Kbo Iwa built a shrine structure known as the Candi Raras Maospahit, in 1200 Saka year (or 1278 Gregorian calendar). The Candi Raras Maospahit is mentioned as a "pelinggih (shrine) in the form of a large red-brick building with two terracota statues flanking the main entrance". Today, the red-brick building Candi Raras Maospahit still exists and become the main shrine of the Pura Maospahit temple complex.

During the reign of the kingdom of Badung in Denpasar, I Pasek the architect was instructed to construct another candi to be used for wayang performance. Before the construction commenced, I Pasek went to Majapahit to study the proper proportion of the new shrine. After I Pasek completed the design of the new shrine, he returned to Denpasar and construct the new shrine in 1475 Saka yar (or year 1553) known as the Candi Raras Majapahit. The building stands beside the earlier Candi Raras Maospahit.

== Temple compound ==
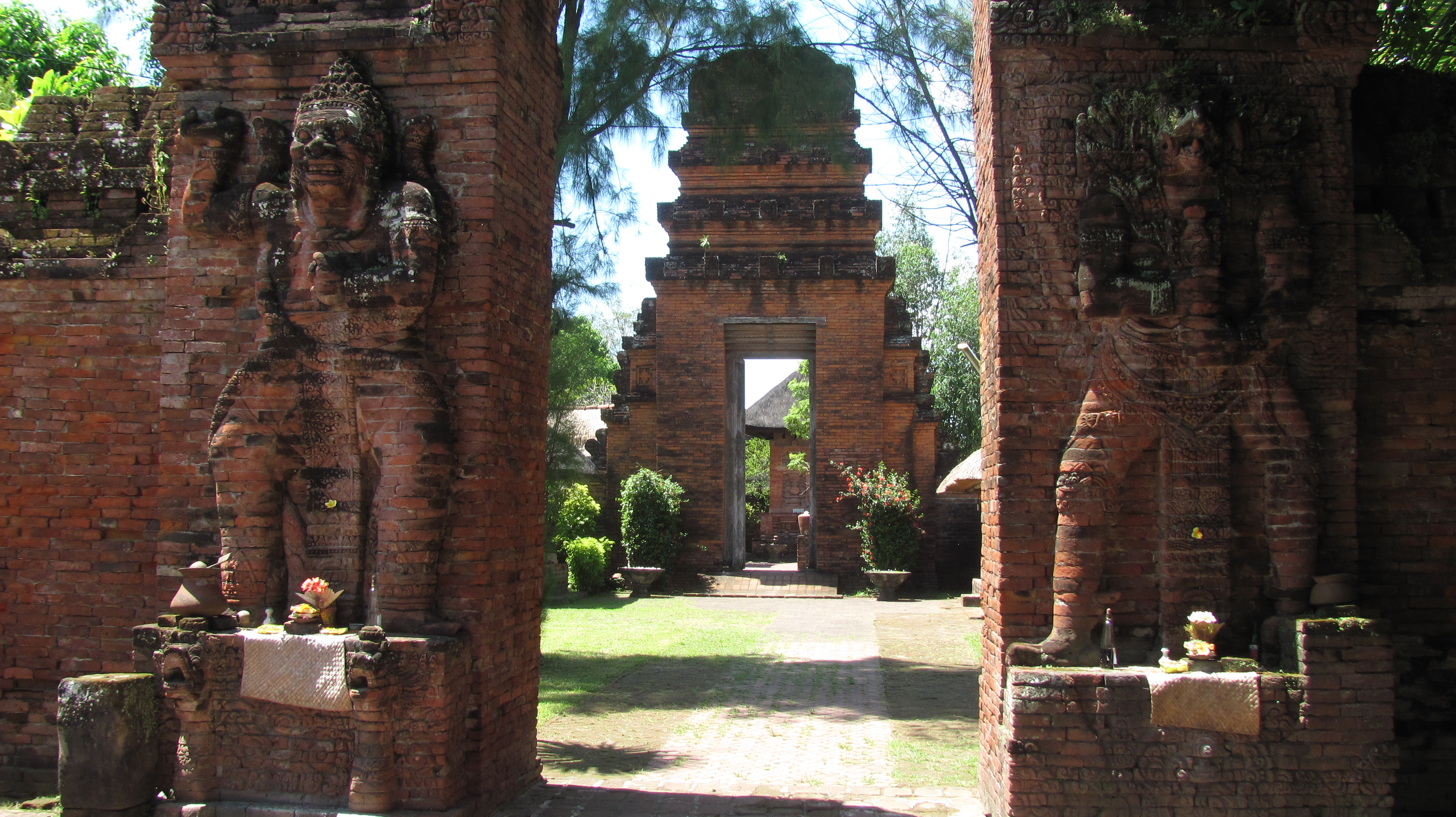
A candi bentar split gate marking the entrance to the middle sanctum, the jaba tengah.

Pura Maospahit is the only temple in Bali that was built using the concept of Panca Mandala. Unlike most Balinese Hindu which is arranged with the most sacred inner sanctum (jero) to the direction of the mountain, the Panca Mandala concept places the most sacred jero area at the center of the temple complex. This form of arrangement is similar to the ancient temples of Majapahit or to the kraton palaces of ancient Java. Pura Maospahit is surrounded by five mandalas or courtyard (panca mandala literally means "five mandalas"). The first mandala is located to the west of the main shrine, access to this mandala is marked by a red-brick kori agung gate facing Jalan Sutomo, known as the Candi Kusuma. A bale kulkul (drum tower) is situated in the first mandala. The second mandala to the south of the main shrine is marked by a kori agung gate known as Candi Renggat, which provides access to the second mandala.

The third mandala, known as jaba sisi is located to the west of the shrine and can be accessed through a gate known as Candi Rebah. The third mandala is where the kitchen of the temple compound is located used to prepare offerings to the shrine.

The fourth mandala known as jaba tengah or madya mandala can be accessed through a candi bentar split gate via the east side of the third mandala courtyard. The fourth mandala was used to display sacred art which is only shown during festivals in Pura Maospahit. The fourth mandala is where several bale (Balinese pavilion) is located e.g. bale pesucian (purification pavilion), bale tajuk, and bale sumanggen.

The fifth mandala known as the jero or the utamaning mandala ("main mandala") is the center most sacred mandala where the main shrines are located: the red-bricked Candi Raras Maospahit and Candi Raras Majapahit. Each of the shrines are dedicated to Ratu Ayu Mas Maospahit and to Ida Bhatara Lingsir Sakti. Other pelinggih shrines similarly built in red bricks and thatched roof dotted the utamaning mandala, each is dedicated toward a local deity.

== Temple festival ==
The biannual piodalan/pujawali festival of the temple is held every Purnama Jyestha to honor Ratu Ayu Mas Maospahit, and every Purnama Kalima to honor Ida Bhatara Lingsir Sakti.

== See also ==
- Balinese temple

== Cited works ==
- Auger, Timothy, ed. (2001). Bali & Lombok. Eyewitness Travel Guides. London: Dorling Kindersley. ISBN 0751368709.
- Stuart-Fox, David (1999). Fox, James J. (ed.). Religion and Ritual: Balinese Hindu Temples. Indonesian Heritage. Singapore: Archipelago Press. ISBN 9813018585.
- I Putu Suyatra (October 8, 2017). "Pura Maospahit; Satu - Satunya Pura Berkonsep Panca Mandala". Bali Express. PT Jawa Pos Group Multimedia. Archived from the original on November 26, 2017.
