= Tirta Empul =

Hindu temple in Bali, Indonesia

Coordinates: 8°24′59″S 115°18′53″E

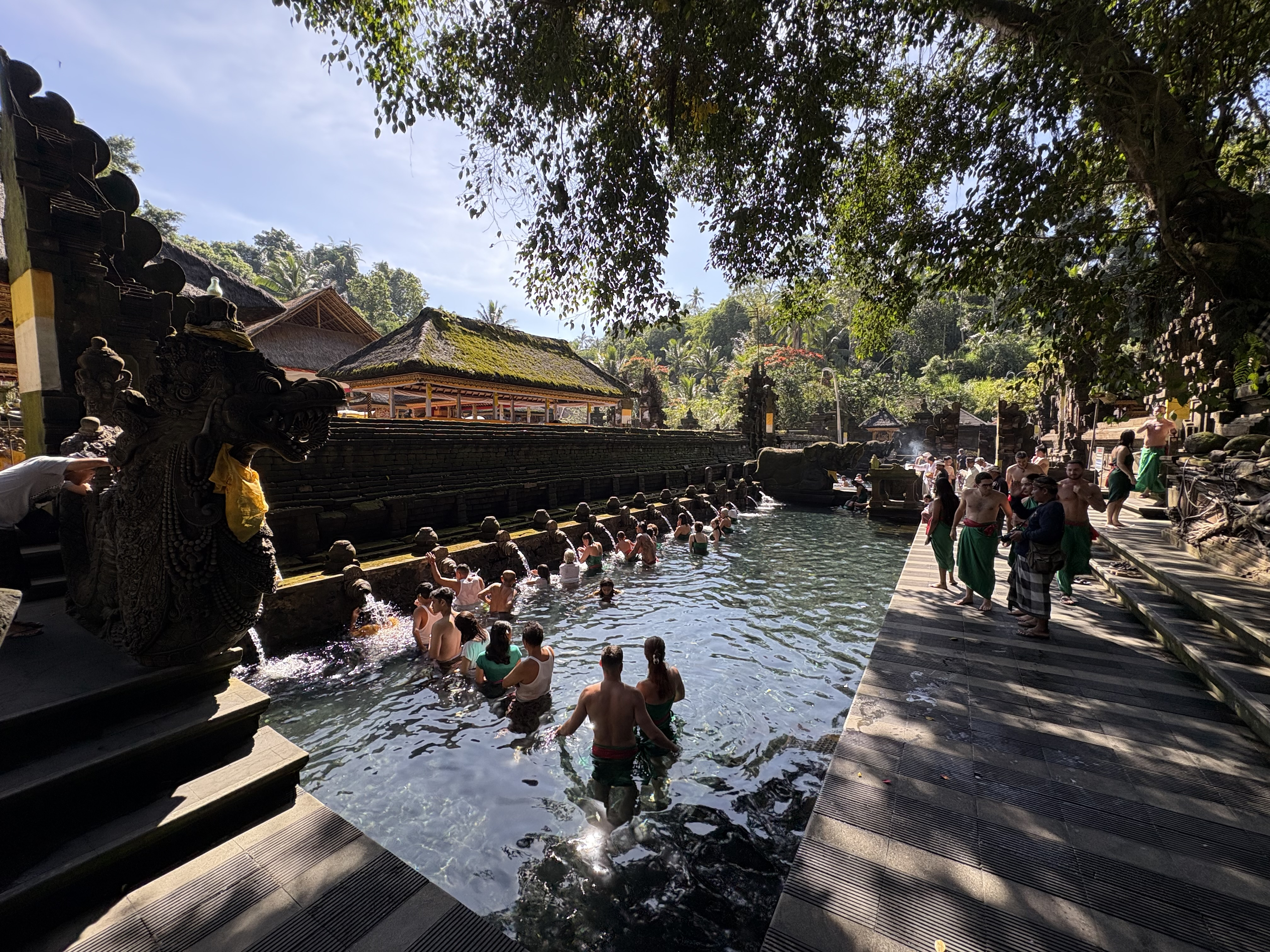
Visitors taking ritual bath (Melukat) at Pura Tirta Empul's baths

Tirta Empul temple (Indonesian: Pura Tirta Empul, Balinese script: ᬧᬸᬭᬢᬷᬃᬣᬳᭂᬫ᭄ᬧᬸᬮ᭄) is a Hindu Balinese water temple located near the town of Tampaksiring, Bali, Indonesia. The temple compound consists of a petirtaan or bathing structure, famous for its holy spring water, where Balinese Hindus go to for a ritual purification called Melukat. The temple pond has a spring which gives out fresh water regularly, which Balinese Hindus consider to be holy or amritha. Tirta Empul which means holy spring that arises from the ground.

== History ==
Tirta Empul Temple was founded around a large water spring in 962 A.D. during the Warmadewa dynasty (10th-14th centuries). The name of the temple comes from the ground water source named "Tirta Empul". The spring is the source of the Pakerisan River. The temple is divided into three sections: Jaba Pura (front yard), Jaba Tengah (central yard) and Jeroan (inner yard). Jaba Tengah contains 2 pools with 30 showers which are named accordingly: Pengelukatan, Pebersihan and Sudamala dan Pancuran Cetik (poison).

The temple is dedicated to Vishnu, another Hindu god name for the supreme consciousness Narayana. On a hill overlooking the temple, a modern villa was built for President Sukarno's visit in 1954. The villa is currently a rest house for important guests.

== Water quality ==
For most of the time, Tirta Empul is believed as a source of clean water for ritual bathing. However, according to a Coconut Bali report in 2017, authorities were investigating reports of water pollution and health risk at Tirta Empul from Gianyar.

== Gallery ==
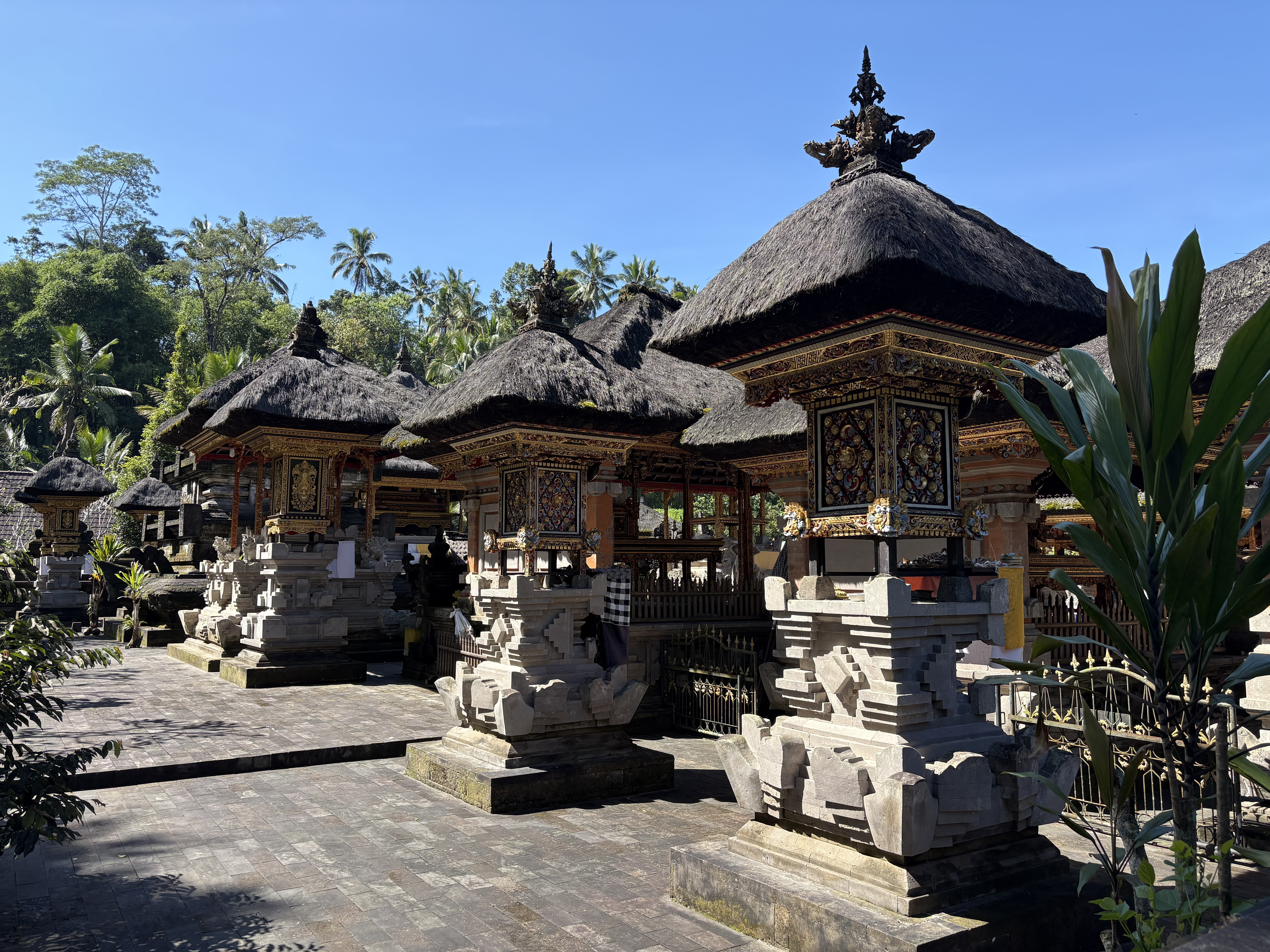
Inner area of the temple

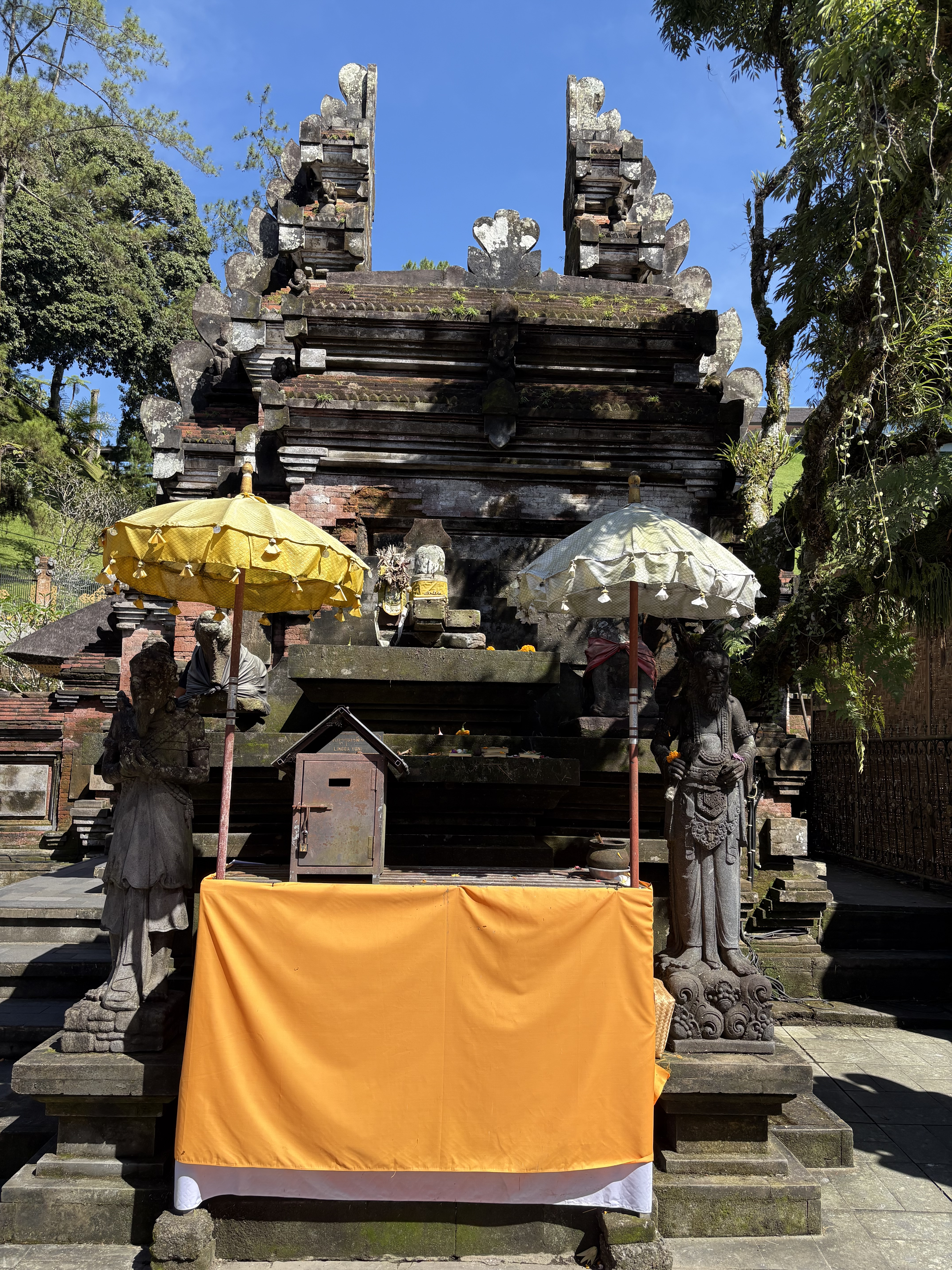
Candi bentar (spilt gateway) and an anltar with linga and yoni

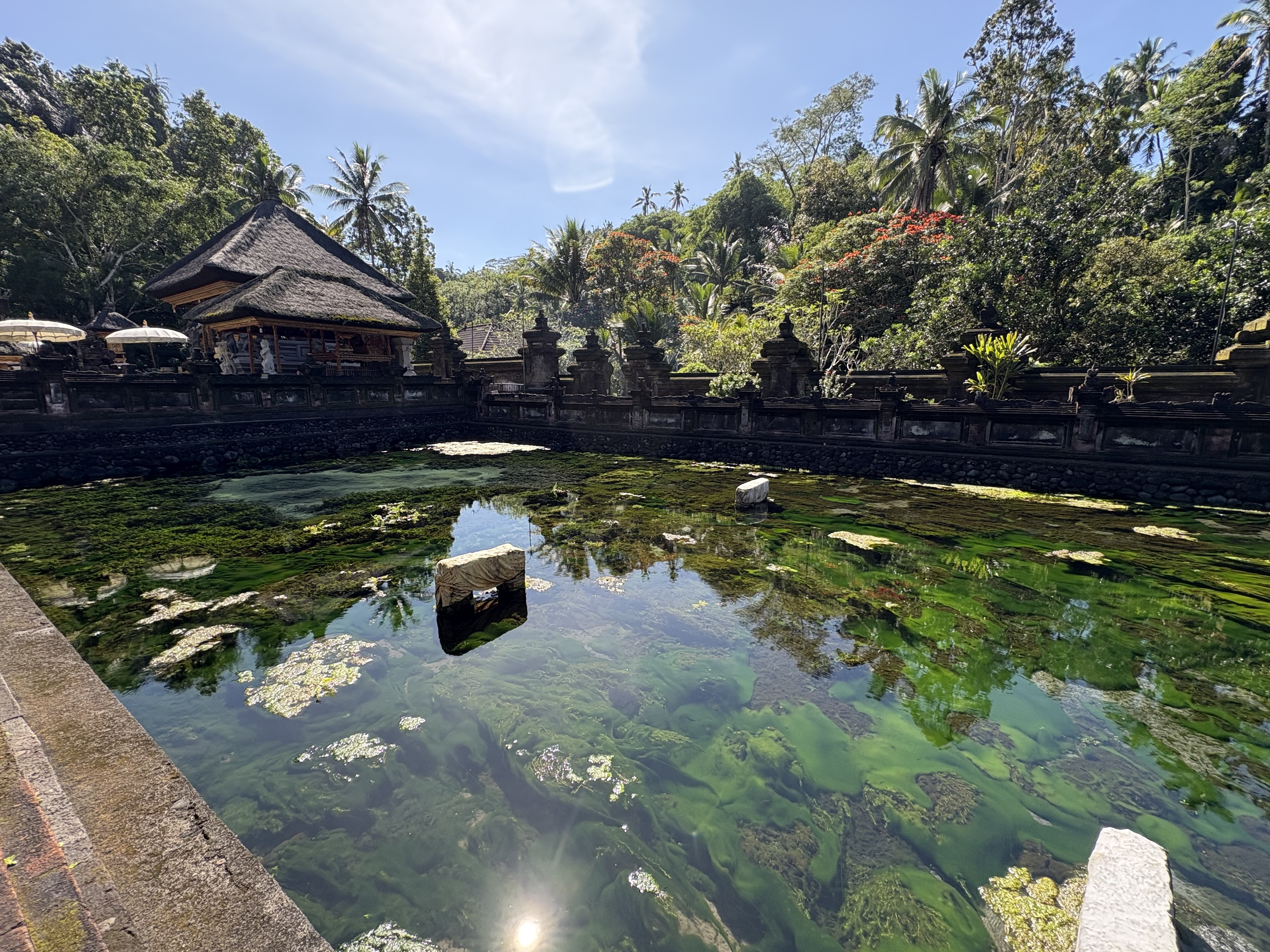
The natural spring pond within the temple complex

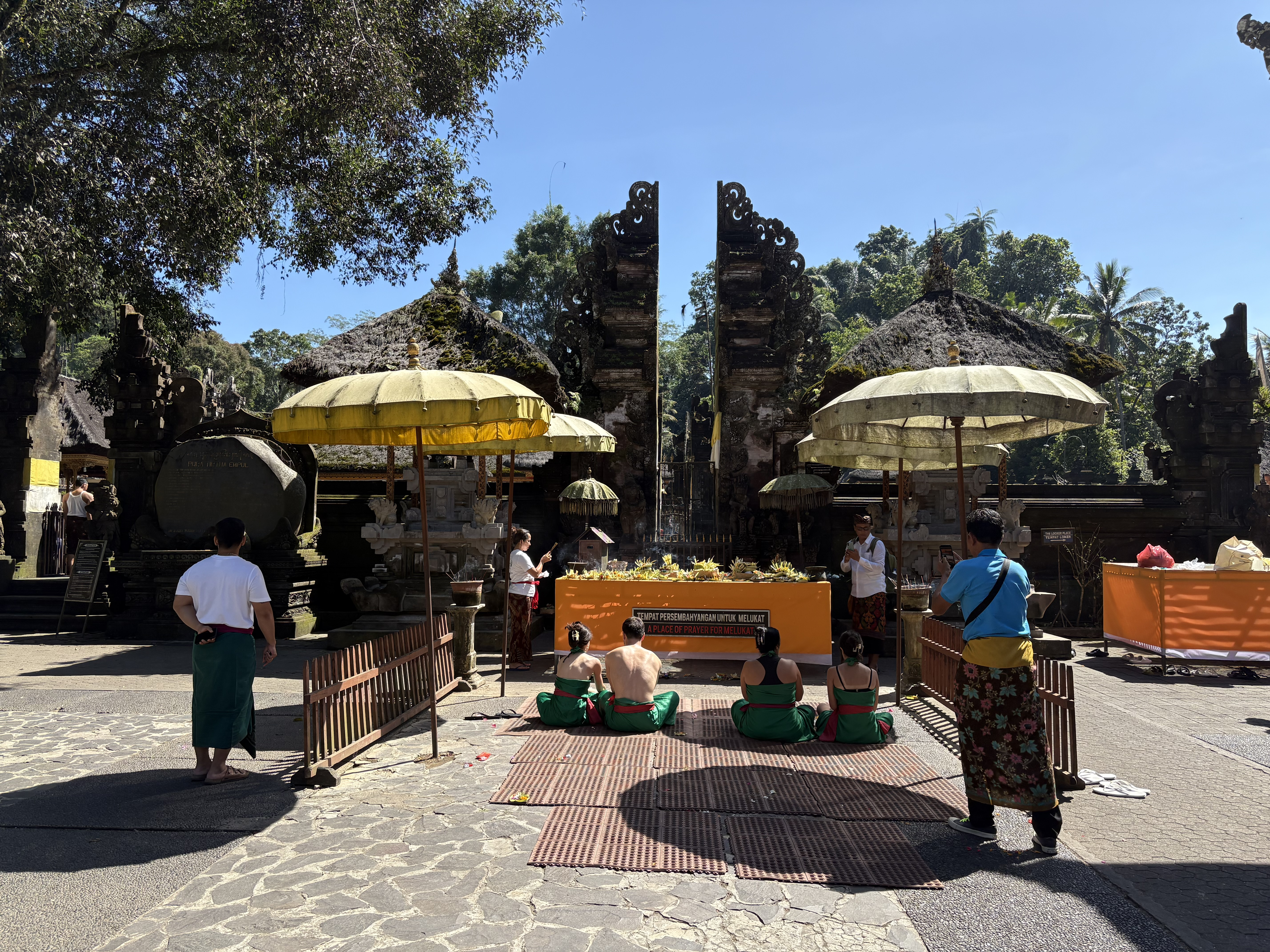
Candi bentar and offering (canang sari) table at the entry to the bath

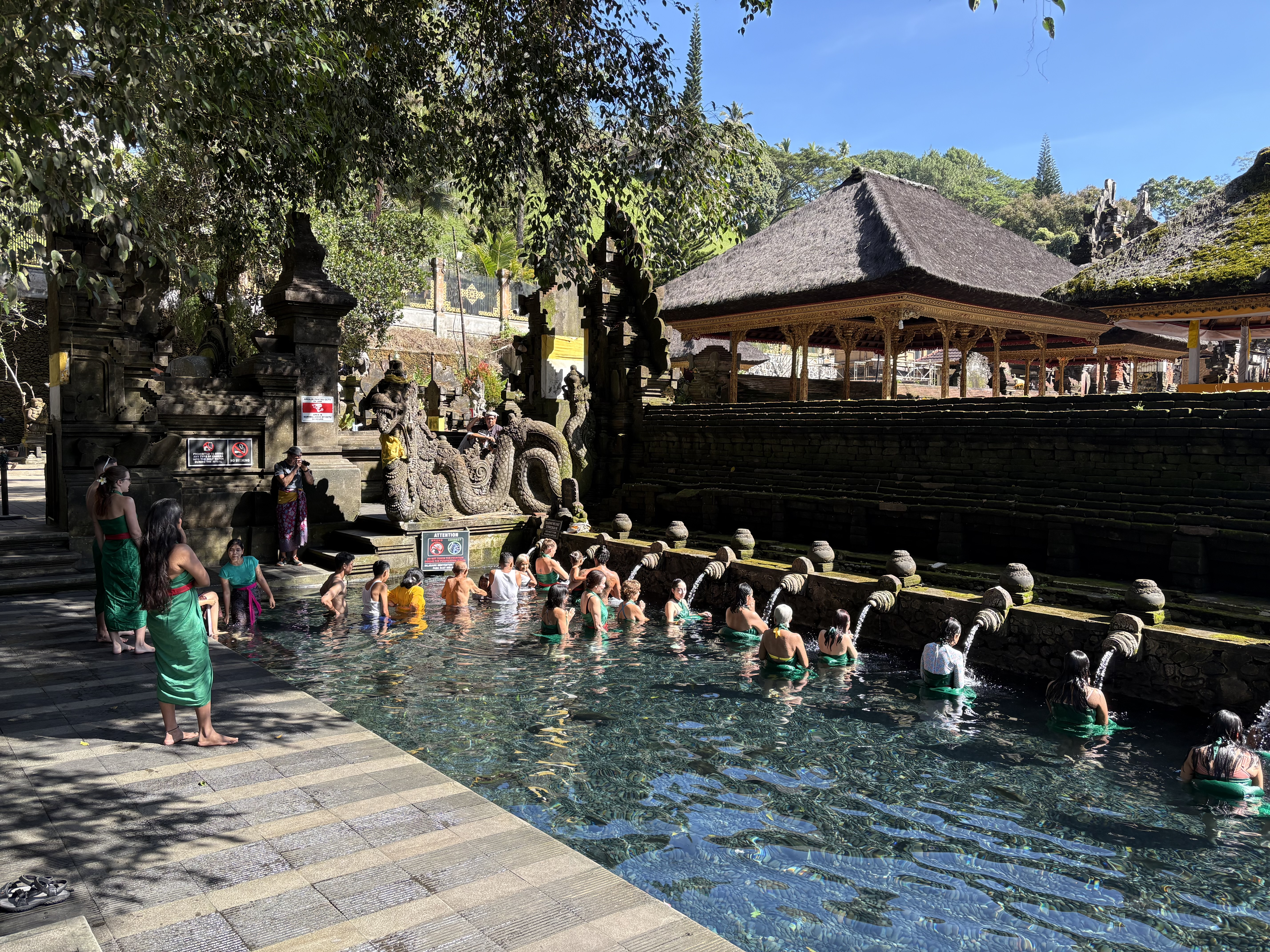
Temple bath

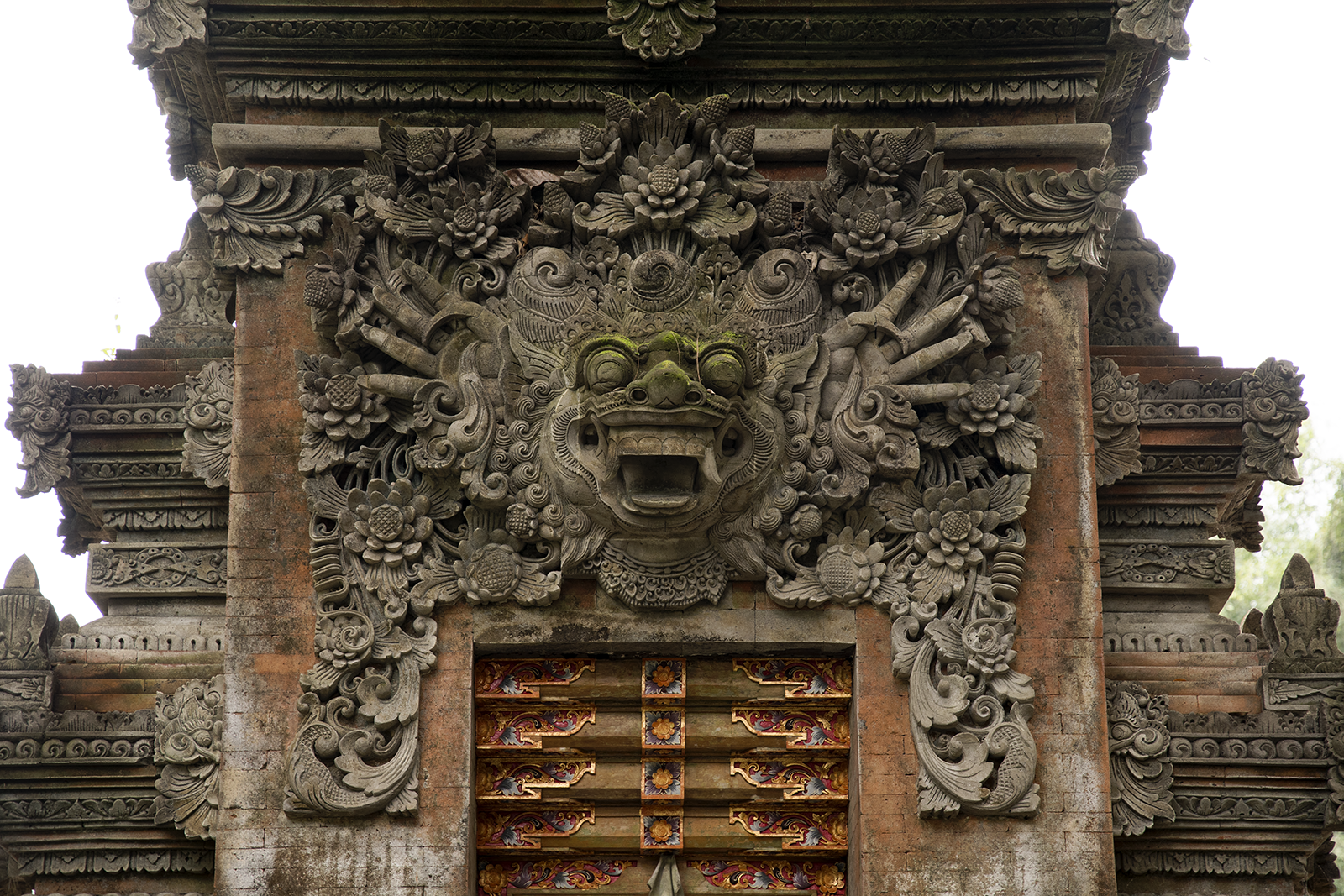
Gate featuring Bhoma at Tirta Empul

== See also ==
- Balinese Hinduism
- List of Hindu temples in Indonesia
