= Pura Penataran Sasih =

Balinese Hindu temple in Indonesia

Coordinates: 8°30′49.54″S 115°17′36.50″E

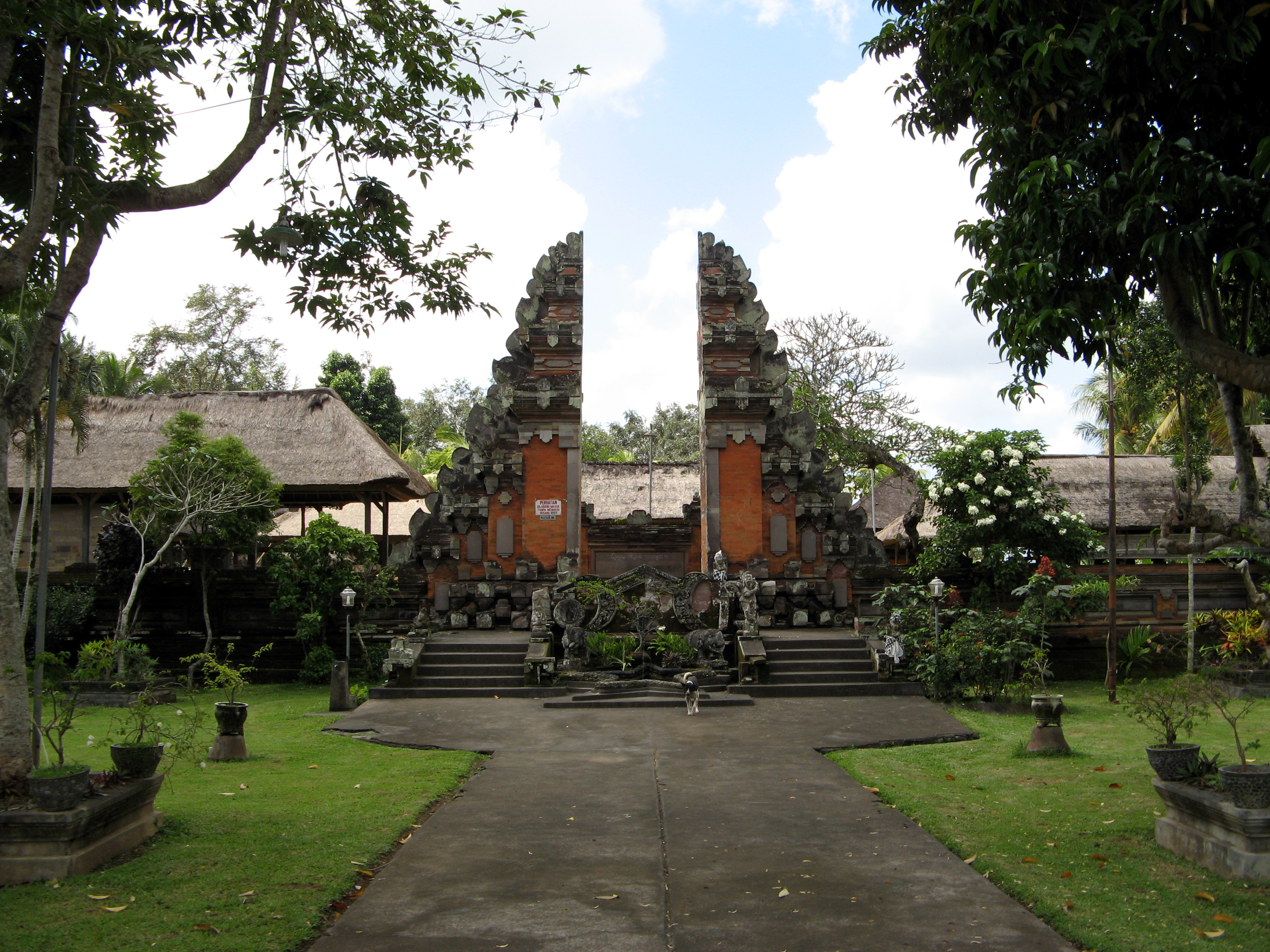
Entrance of Penataran Sasih

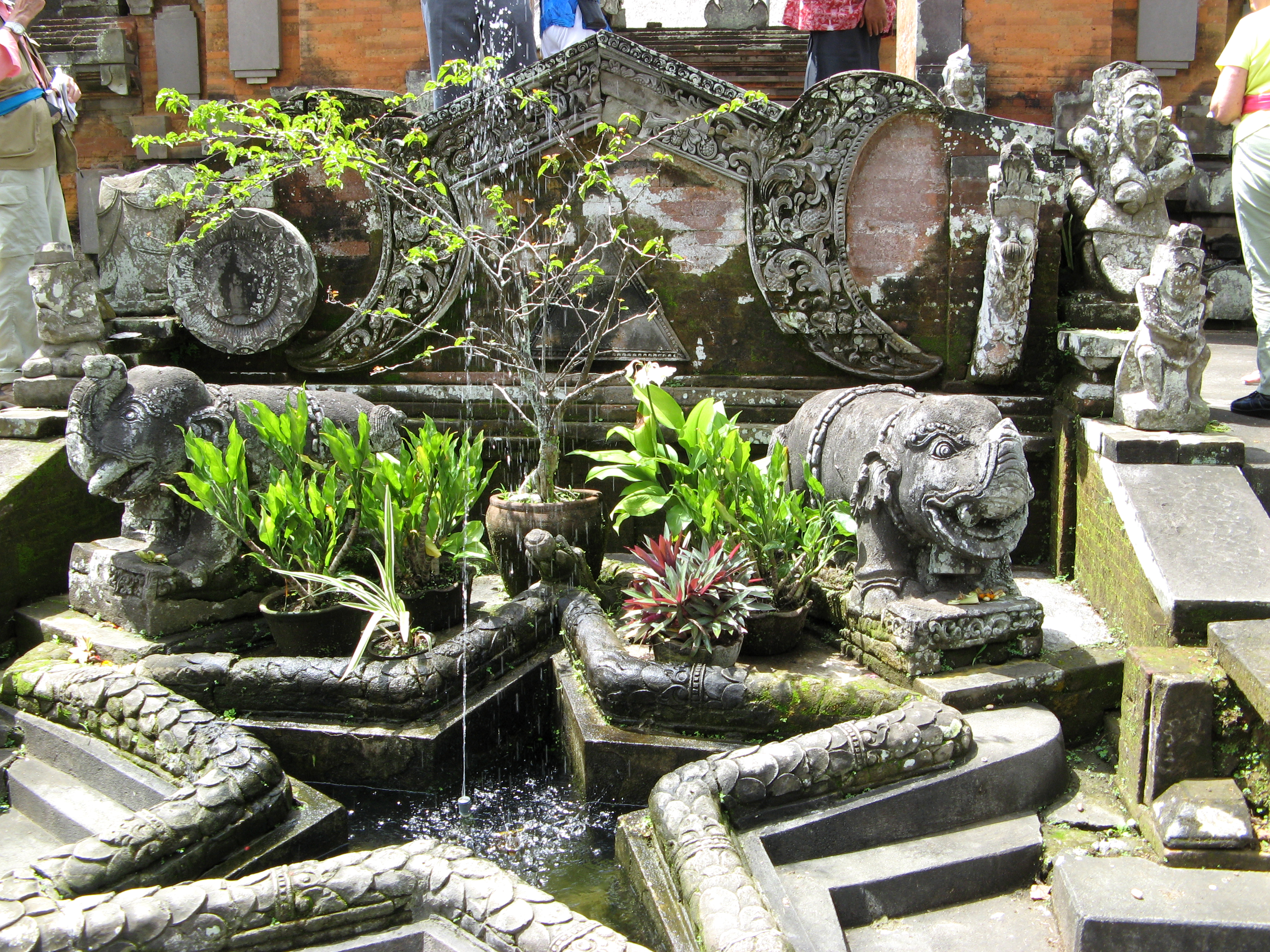
Chronogram of Penataran Sasih

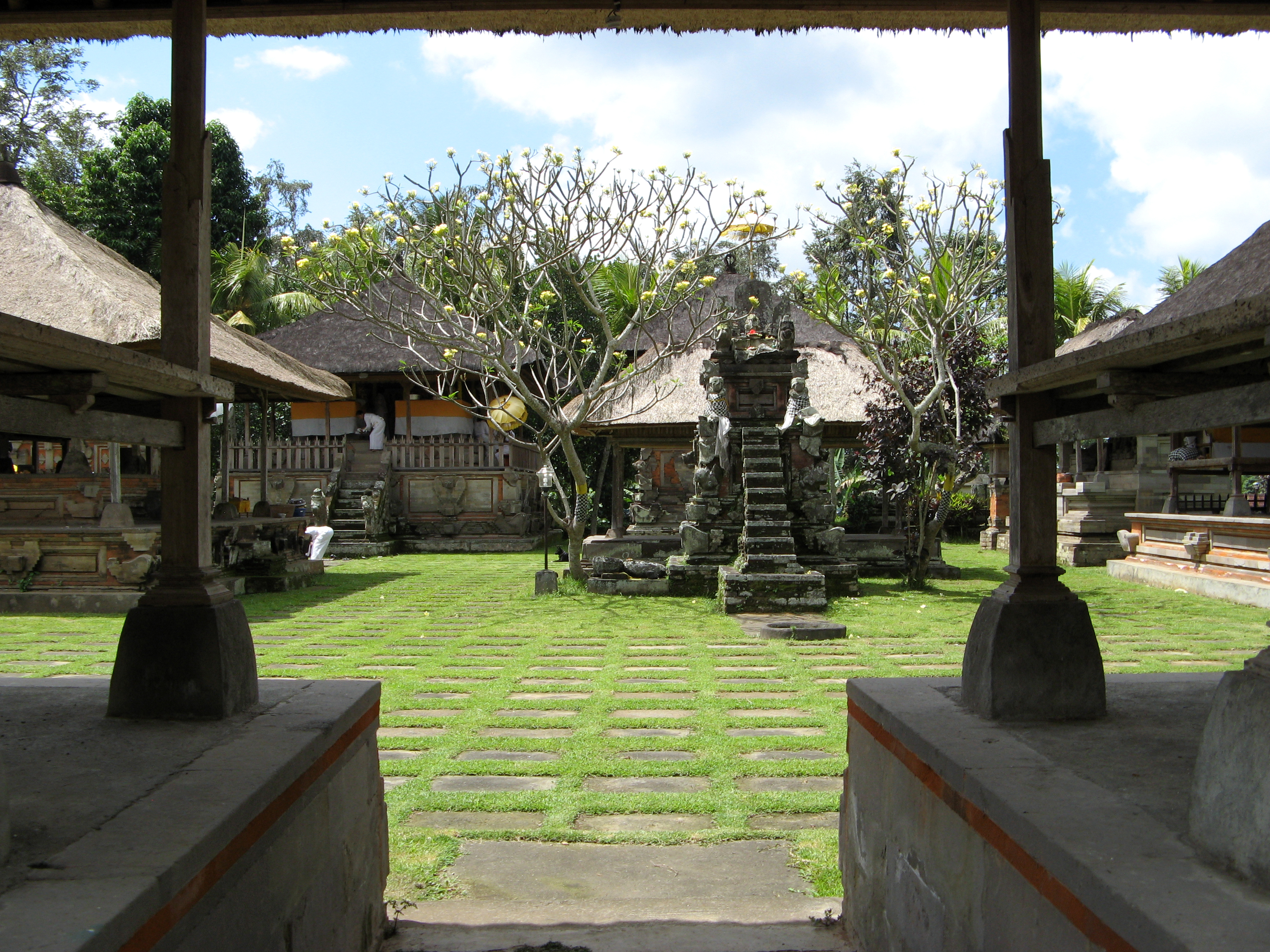
Courtyard of Penataran Sasih

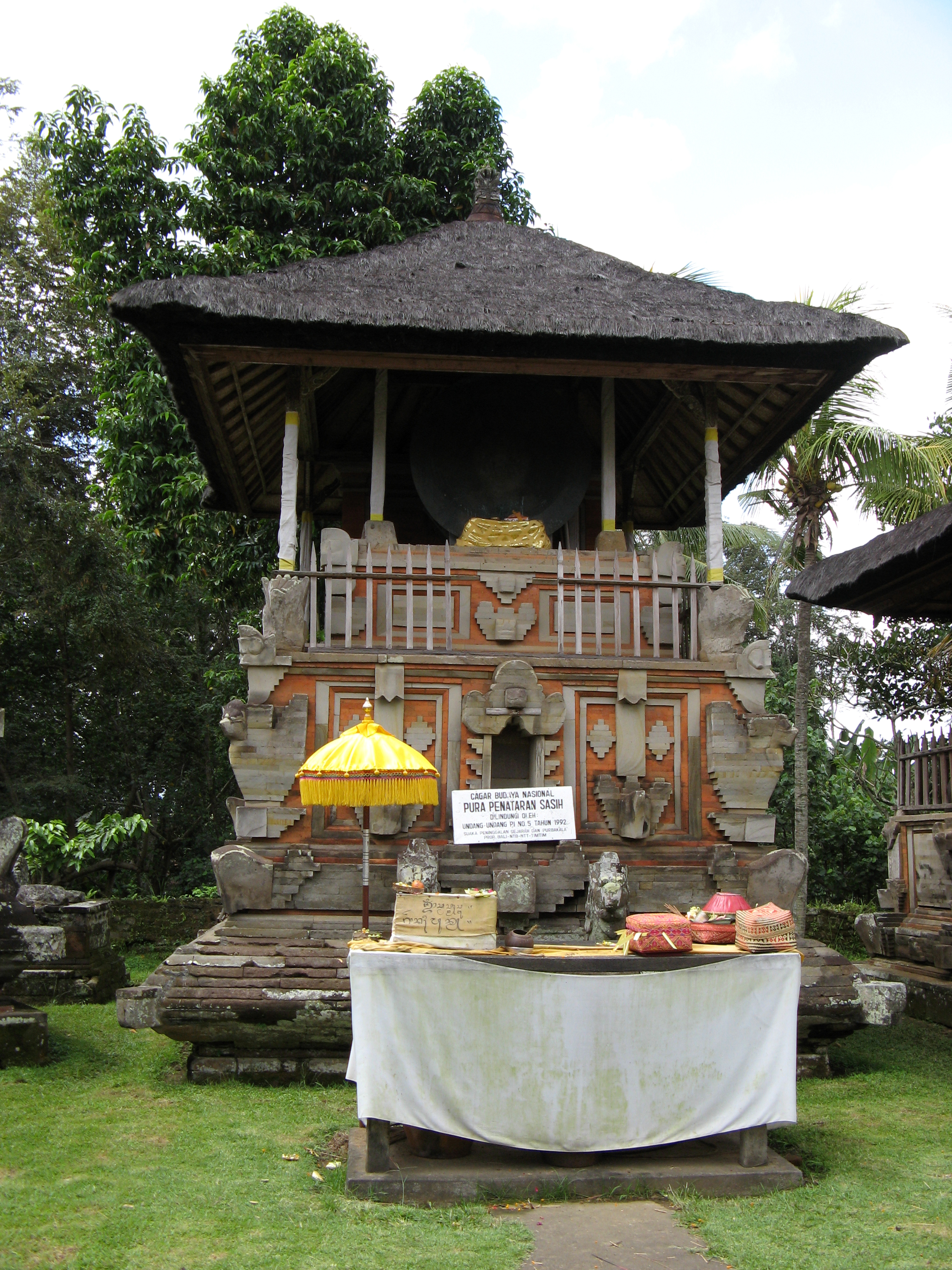
Pavilion that houses the Moon of Pejeng

Pura Penataran Sasih is a Hindu temple in Pejeng village, Bali. According to a modern chronogram displayed at the entrance, it was founded in 1266 AD and served as the state temple of the Pejeng Kingdom (1293–1343 AD).

Significant features of the temple include:

- A split-gate entrance.
- A modern chronogram in front of the entrance.
- A collection of 10th–12th century Hindu sculptures that were brought here from other parts of the island.
- A very tall, stone Seat of Ganesh in the middle of the main courtyard.
- The celebrated Moon of Pejeng, a very early and revered colossal bronze drum.

The temple stands 600 m north of the Gedong Arca Museum where a number of archaeological relics are also held, including a fine collection of Balinese sarcophagi.
