= Gedong Arca Museum, Bedulu =

Museum in Bedulu on Bali, Indonesia

The Purbakala Archaeological Museum (also known as the Gedong Arca Museum) is a museum located in Bedulu on Bali, Indonesia. It holds an important collection of sarcophagi.

== History ==
The museum was built between 1958 and 1959 on a plot of 2,564 m^{2} of land, on the initiative of R.P. Soejono, then head of the Office of the Archaeological Institute and National Heritage II in Gianyar. It was inaugurated on 14 September 1974 by Brigjen Soekarmen, the Governor of Bali. It has since become an important institution for the preservation of ancient relics from Bali and the other Lesser Sunda Islands.

== Description ==
The museum has three courtyards:

- The outer courtyard includes three spaces: the wantilan (pavilion), the ticket sales office and the bale kulkul ('kulkul pavilion').
- The central courtyard includes five spaces and is the main exhibition area. It centres on a pond surrounded by a garden.
- The inner courtyard contains a pavilion and seven spaces used for special events and storage.

== Collections ==
The museum houses approximately 3,000 cultural heritage items, spanning periods from prehistoric and protohistoric times (the Stone Age to the Bronze Age) and from the 8th to the 15th century. These include ancient household tools, hunting and fishing implements, cultivation tools, and other items used for religious or ritual purposes. One section of the museum contains bronze artefacts that are early elements of the Hindu religion, such as the cakra – a weapon used by the god Wisnu – and a priest's ceremonial bell. Another section contains stone tools, including axes and flints, as well as some metal utensils. These diverse artefacts, categorised and dated, are presented in large display cabinets.

The museum also holds a collection of sarcophagi from around the island. Their sizes vary, from small flat coffins to much larger and longer examples – the size indicating the status of the deceased. Many of these sarcophagi are shaped like turtles and adorned with protrusions and carvings representing faces with wide eyes, open mouths and protruding tongues. It is assumed that these features were considered to possess magical powers, intended to protect the coffin and the community from negative forces. Some also bear carved spells, serving the same protective purpose.

Committed to maintaining and documenting ancient findings, the museum serves as an educational resource, visited primarily by students seeking research data and items that bear witness to the earliest traces of Balinese civilisation.

== Surroundings ==
The museum stands 600 metres south of the Penataran Sasih Temple, where a number of archaeological relics are also held – most famously the bronze kettledrum known as the Moon of Pejeng (Bulan Pejeng), so named for its circular shape, which resembles a full moon. The drum was likely made in Bali, as its large mould has also been found on the island.

== Bibliography ==
- Lenzi, Iola (2004). Museums of Southeast Asia. Singapore: Archipelago Press. p. 200. ISBN 981-4068-96-9.
