= Moon of Pejeng =

Single-cast bronze kettle drum

Coordinates: 8°30′49.54″S 115°17′36.50″E

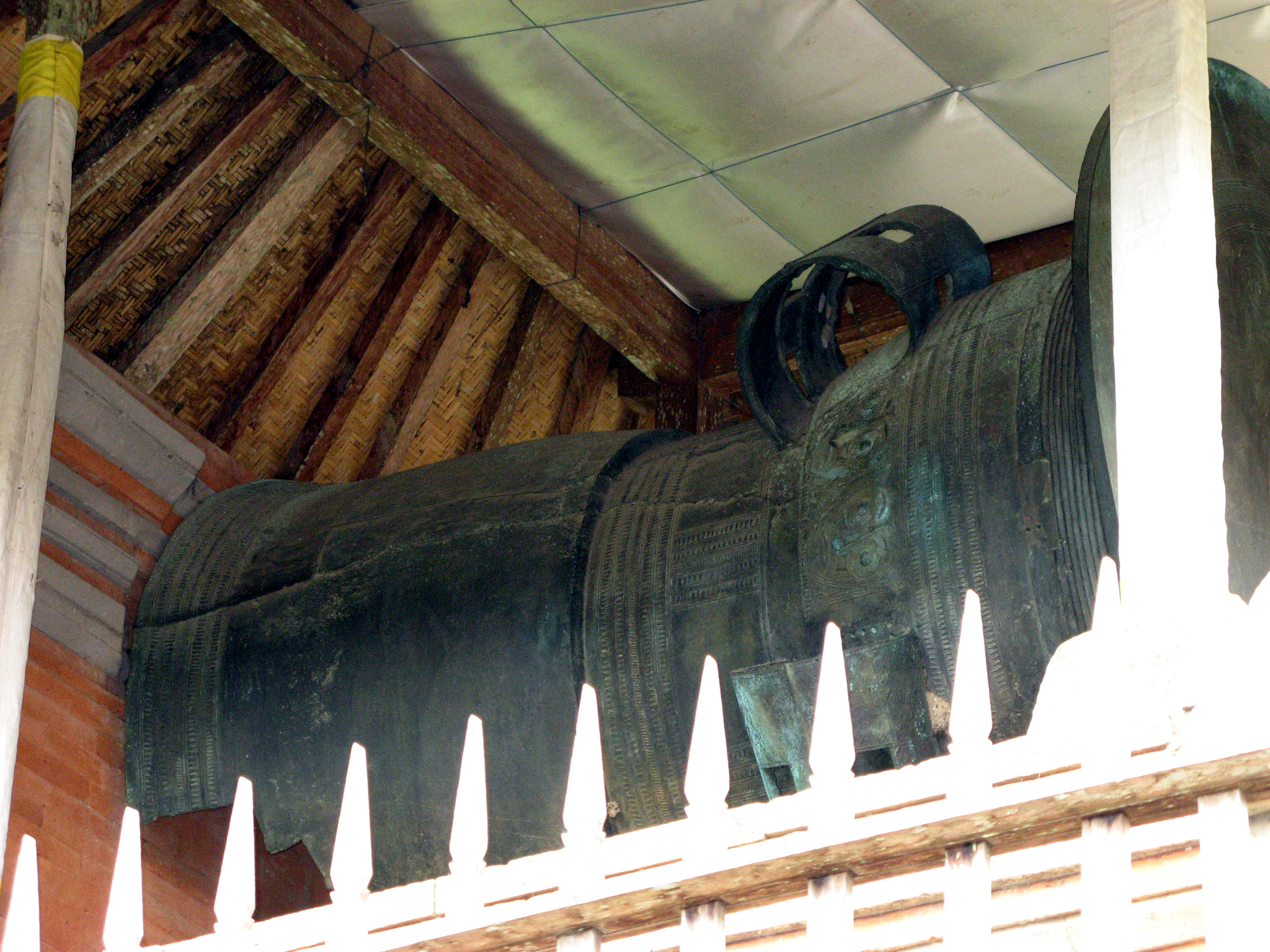
Moon of Pejeng

The Moon of Pejeng, also known as the Pejeng Moon, in Bali is the largest single-cast bronze kettle drum in the world. and "the largest known relic from Southeast Asia's Bronze Age period." It is "considered highly sacred by local people." It is thought to be a relic of early rice cultivation rituals.

The drum is 186.6 centimetres (73.5 in) high and the diameter of the tympano is 160 centimetres (63 in). It is kept at Pura Penataran Sasih Temple in Pejeng, near Ubud, in the Petauan River valley which, along with the adjacent Pakerisan River valley, forms the heartland of South Bali where complex irrigated rice culture first evolved on the island.

Its large mould was also found on the island.

== History ==
The Dong Son people made the drum around 300 BC, more than two thousand years ago. According to Balinese legend, the Pejeng Moon was a wheel of the chariot that pulled the real moon through the night sky. One night, as the chariot was passing over Pejeng, the wheel detached and fell to earth, landing in a tree, where it glowed nearly as brightly as the real moon. This light disturbed a thief who, annoyed, climbed the tree and urinated on it; the thief paid for his sacrilege with his life. The moon eventually cooled and has been preserved as a sacred relic by the local villagers.

It is the largest and most complete type of drum known as the Pejeng type drums which have been found in Bali and Java, Indonesia.

The Pejeng Moon was first reported to the western world by G.E. Rumphius in his book The Ambonese Curiosity Cabinet, published in 1705. The Moon was first systematically described by the Dutch artist W.O.J. Nieuwenkamp who reproduced the famous face motif.

== Possible use ==
Similar drums—albeit smaller—have been found in Bali, such as that discovered in 1997 in Manikliyu (west side of Bangli Regency), in a unique burial system thus far unknown in Indonesia.

A. Calo suggests that such kettle drums were associated with early rice cults—and cultivation—in Bali: most of them are found near sources of irrigation water (lakes, springs or weirs in rivers); their shape and decoration are reminded in modern representations of female deities associated with rice and irrigation water, the latter originating in a pre-Hindu culture and later integrated into the Hindu-Balinese panel of gods. Ritual ceremonies honouring these deities are still held to this day at places where irrigation water first enters fields (bedugul) and at crater lakes, the highest sources.

== See also ==
- Bronze drum
