= Pejeng =

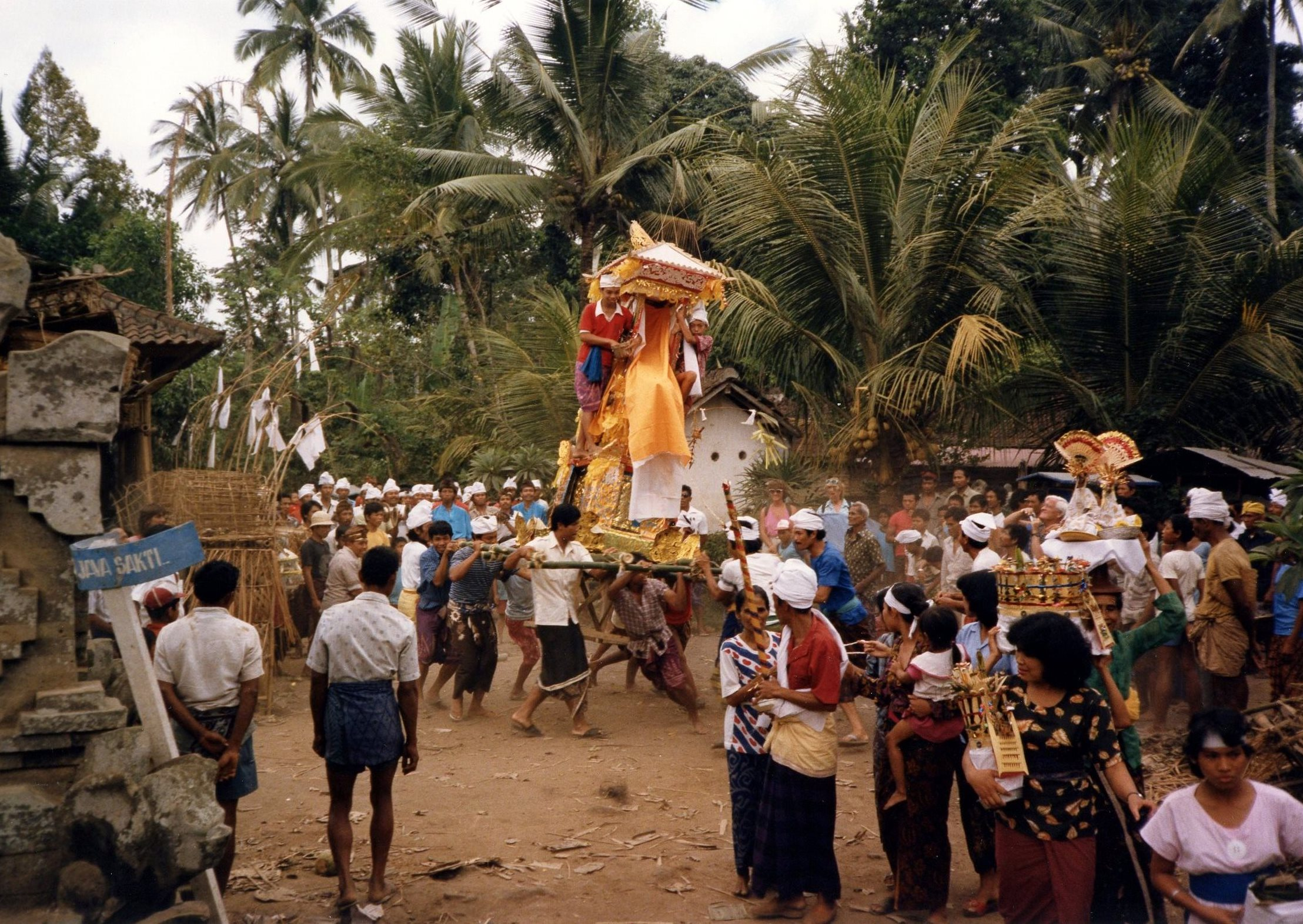
- A cremation procession in Pejeng

- Location in Bali
- Coordinates: 8°30′50″S 115°17′36″E
- Country: Indonesia
- Province: Bali

Pejeng is a village in Bali, Indonesia, in the Petanu River valley. It is a bit east of Ubud in Gianyar Regency. It is home to the Moon of Pejeng, the largest single-cast bronze kettle drum in the world. Pejeng is a rural area with extensive, and ancient, irrigated rice cultivation.

It is also home to Pura Pusering Jagat (Pura Puser Tasik), one of the nine directional temples of Bali and the one that stands for the center direction.
