= NBIA =

NBIA may refer to:

- Niels Bohr International Academy, a Center for Theoretical Physics at the Niels Bohr Institute, Copenhagen
- Neurodegeneration with brain iron accumulation, a group of degenerative diseases of the brain
- (New) Bangkok International Airport (Suvarnabhumi Airport), an international airport serving Bangkok, Thailand
- National Biomedical Imaging Archive, a National Cancer Institute repository of medical images for researchers and imaging tool developers
- Normandy Beach Improvement Association
- North Bali International Airport
