= Jembrana City International Airport =

Jembrana City International Airport Bandar Udara Internasional Kota Jembrana
- IATA: none; ICAO: none

Summary

Runways
| Direction | Length | | Surface |
| Direction | ft | m | Surface |
|---|---|---|---|
| | 11,811 | 3,600 | Asphalt |

Jembrana City International Airport, also known as New Bali International Airport, was a proposed airport in Jembrana Regency in the province of Bali, Indonesia. It was formerly planned to replace Ngurah Rai International Airport. However, this plan was officially removed from the Government Priority List by President Joko Widodo in July 2022, along with the North Bali International Airport plan.

The project was estimated to cost US$110 million.

== See also ==
- North Bali International Airport, another proposed site.
