= Negara, Bali =

Negara
- Nickname: ᬒᬁᬢᬶᬬᬂ

- Location in Bali Location in Indonesia
- Coordinates: 8°21′25″S 114°37′1″E
- Country: Indonesia
- Province: Bali
- Regency: Jembrana Regency

Area
  - Total: 97.56 km^{2} (37.67 sq mi)

Population (mid 2024 estimate)
  - Total: 100,074
  - Density: 1,026/km^{2} (2,657/sq mi)
- Time zone: UTC+8 (WITA)

Negara (Indonesian pronunciation: [nəˈɡara]) is an administrative district (kecamatan) which serves as the administrative capital of the Jembrana Regency in Bali, Indonesia.

== Etymology ==
Negara means 'town' or 'city' in the Balinese language. The word originates from the Sanskrit word nagara, with the same meaning.
