= Loloan Malays =

Malay subgroup lives in Bali, Indonesia

Orang Melayu Loloan ملايو لولون ᬮᭀᬮᭀᬯᬦ᭄

Total population
- Indonesia: 28,000

Regions with significant populations
- Bali (mainly in Jembrana Regency)

Languages
- Balinese Malay, Balinese, Indonesian

Religion
- Predominantly Sunni Islam

Related ethnic groups
- Malays and Buginese

Loloan Malays or Balinese Malays (Malay: Orang Melayu Loloan; Jawi: ملايو لولون; Balinese: ᬮᭀᬮᭀᬯᬦ᭄) are a sub-ethnic group of the Malays who have lived in East Loloan and West Loloan villages, Jembrana, Bali, Indonesia, since the 17th century. There are approximately 28,000 Loloan Malays living in Bali.

The Loloan Malays are predominantly Sunni Muslim, which is distinguished from the majority Balinese ethnic group who are predominantly Hindu.

== History ==
The arrival of Malays in Bali was recorded in 1669 when four ulama and their followers arrived in Jembrana to spread the teachings of Islam in Bali. This mission was permitted by King of Jembrana namely I Gusti Arya Pancoran. The four scholars are Dawan Sirajuddin of Sarawak, Empire of Brunei; Sheikh Bashir of Yemen, Ottoman Empire; Mohammad Yasin of Makassar; and Syihabbudin who also comes from Makassar.

In 1799, four ships from Pontianak City, Pontianak Sultanate arrived in Jembrana and were welcomed by the King of Jembrana namely Putu Seloka. The delegation was led by Syarif Abdullah Yahya al-Qadri and brought a scholar from Terengganu namely Muhammad Ya'qub. By King of Jembrana, the group was allowed to live on 80 hectares of land in Loloan Barat (West Loloan) and Loloan Timur (East Loloan).

However, according to the Loloan elder, Haji Achmad Damannuri, the development of Loloan Malay society was the result of encounters between Buginese who initially fled to Perancak, Jembrana from the pursuit of VOC in Makassar in 1653 with a scholar from Sarawak, Buyut Lebai, in 1675 who taught Islam using Malay as the instruction language. The Buginese people then received approval from Jembrana to occupy the Loloan area.

Another study conducted by the Udayana University academics agrees with Haji Achmad Damannuri's narrative, suggesting that the Loloan Malays was the result of mixed marriages between the Buginese people who were allowed to settle in Loloan and the Balinese who lived in the vicinity. The second wave of Loloan Malays identity formation in Loloan was explained by the arrival of migrants from Pontianak which also led to mixed marriages.

== See also ==
- Malays (ethnic group)
- Ampenan Malays
