= Jembrana Regency =

Regency in Bali, Indonesia

Jembrana Regency Kabupaten Jembrana
- Regency

Native transcription(s)
  - Balinese: ᬓᬪᬹᬧᬢᬾᬦ᭄ᬚᭂᬫ᭄ᬩ᭄ᬭᬡ Kabupatén Jĕmbŕ‌‌ana
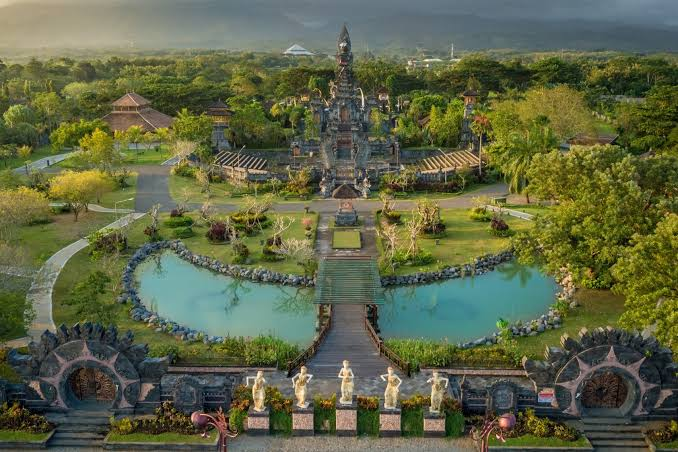
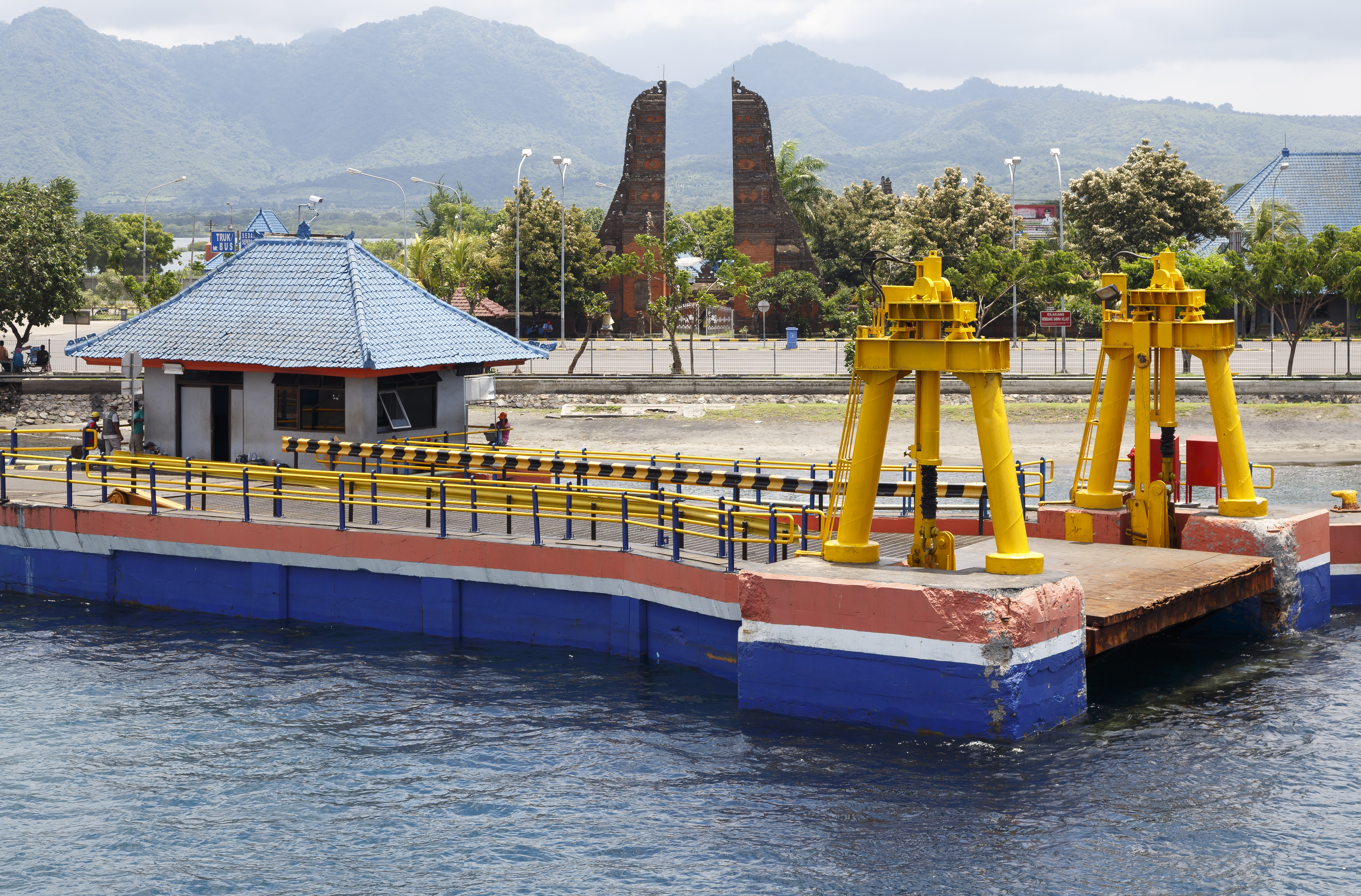
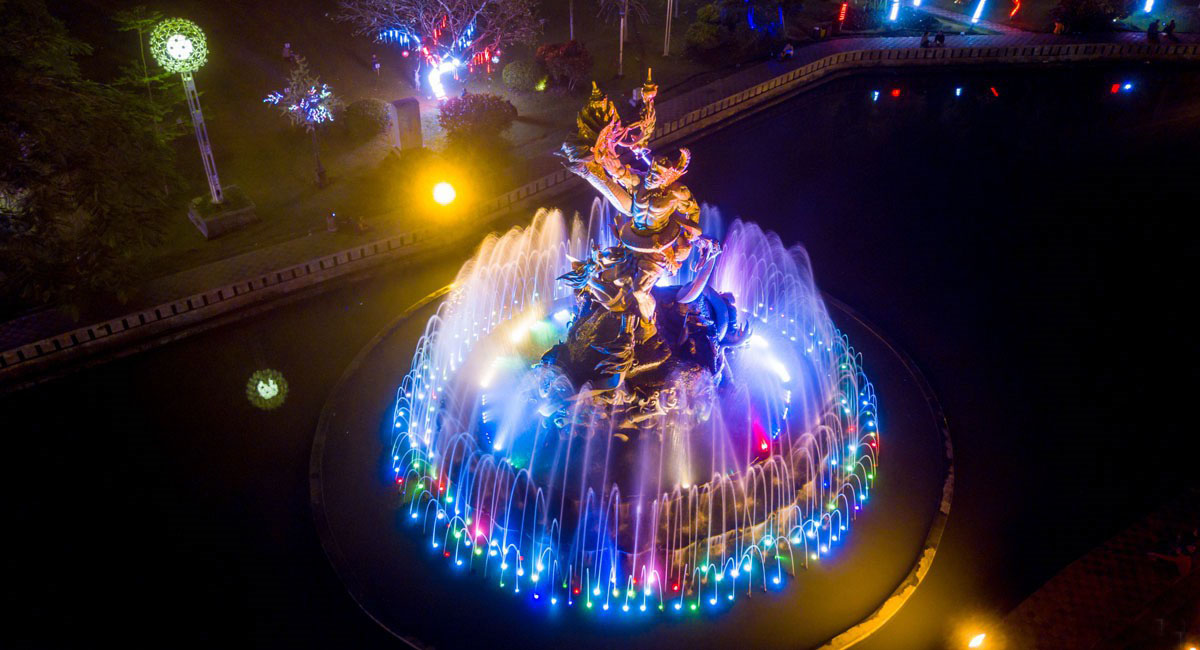
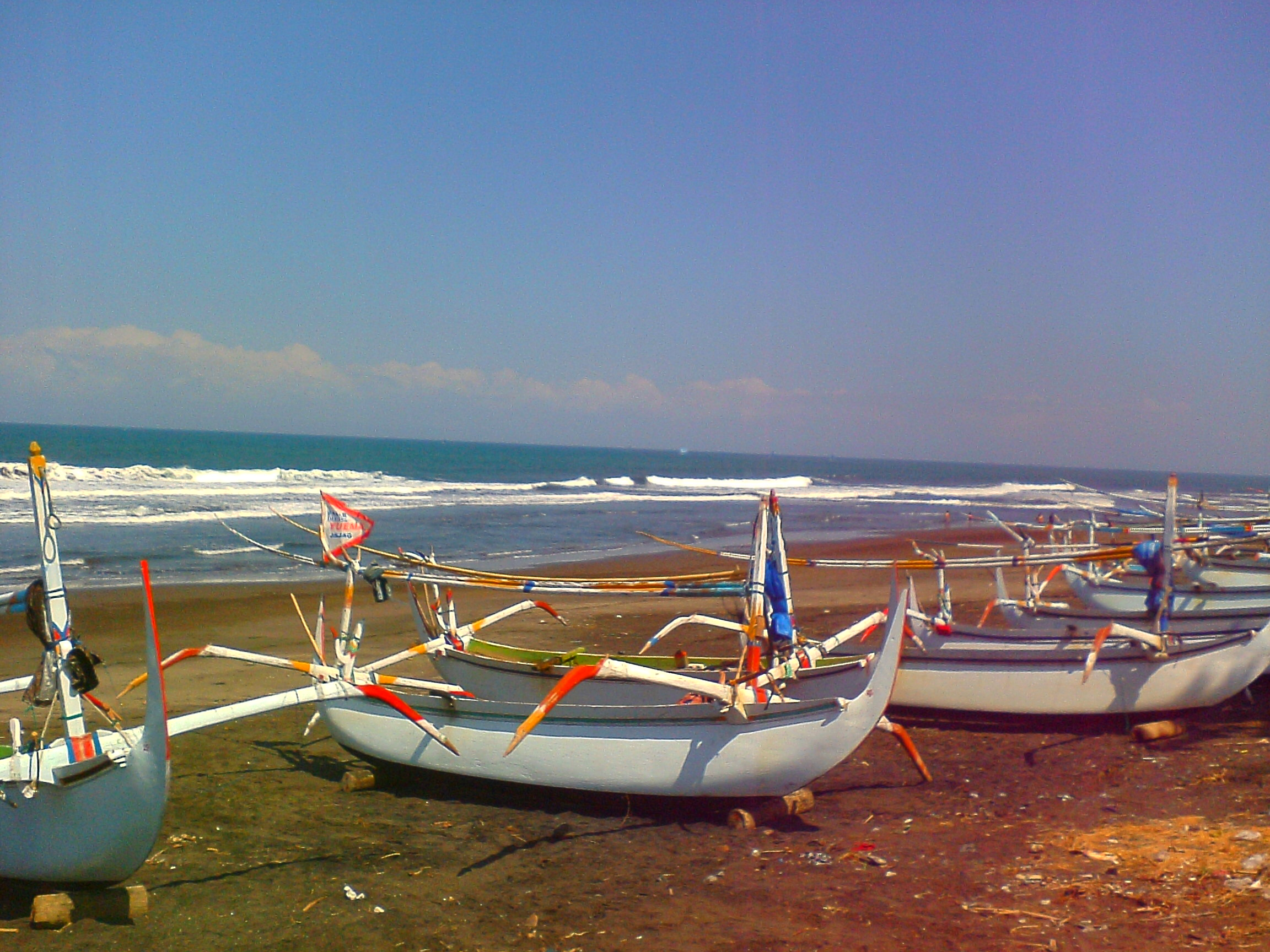
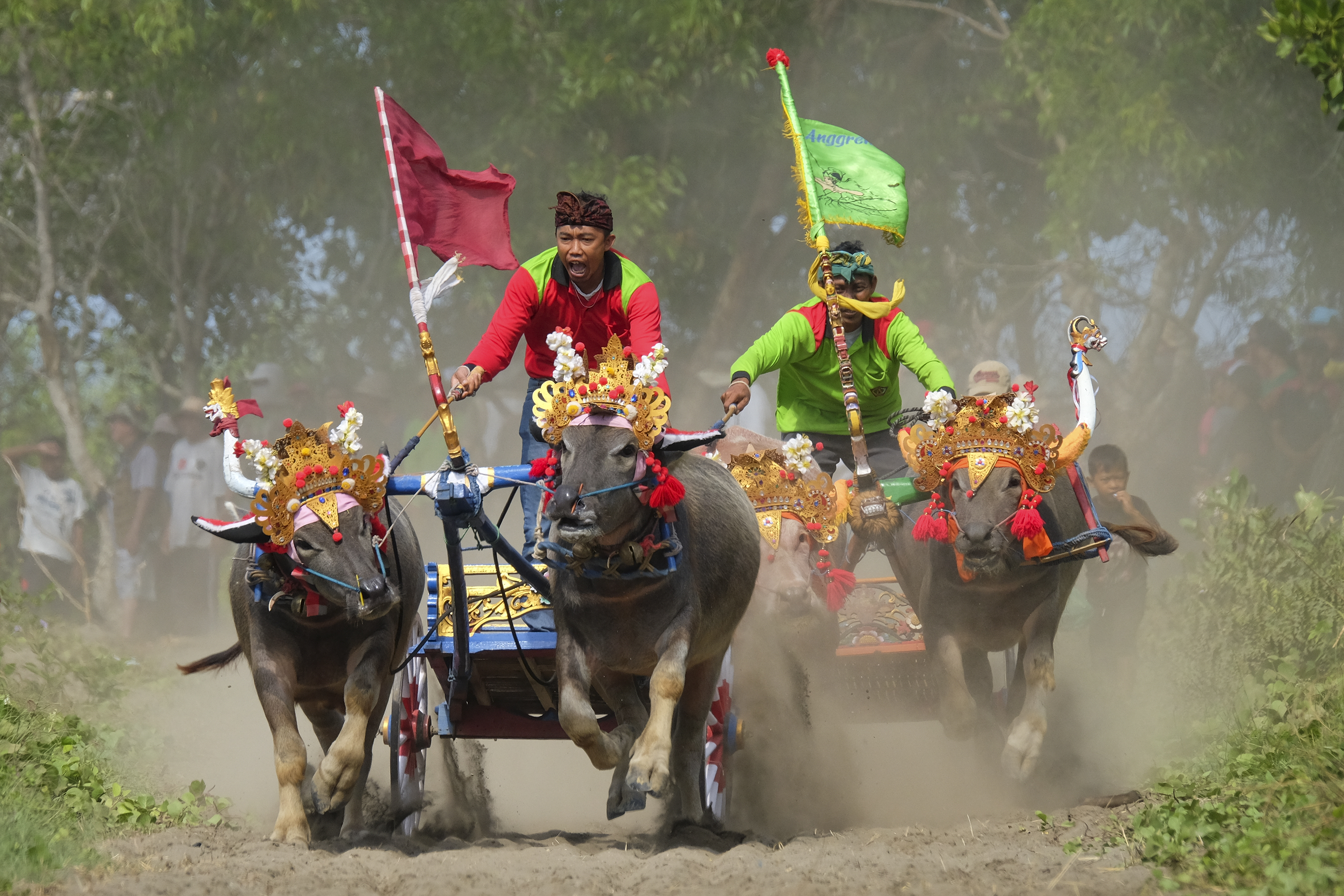
- Jagatnatha Botanic Garden Gilimanuk Port Pecangakan Park, Negara Cupel Beach Mekepung tradition

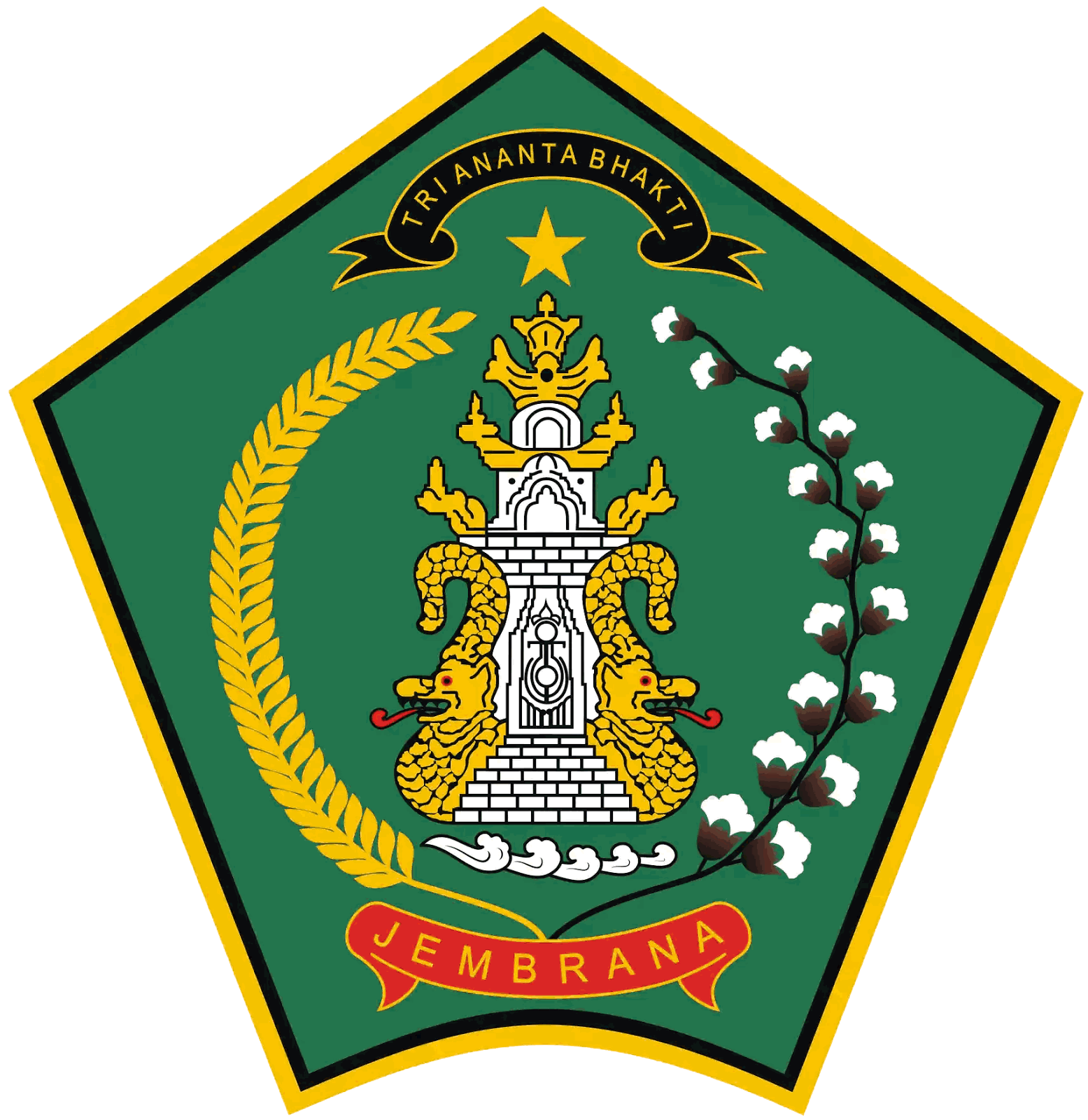
- Coat of arms
- Nickname: Gumi Mekepung ('Land of Mekepung')
- Motto(s): Tri Ananta Bhakti (Sanskrit) ᬢ᭄ᬭᬶᬅᬦᬦ᭄ᬢᬪᬓ᭄ᬢᬶ "Three Eternal Devotions: to God, Homeland, and Life"
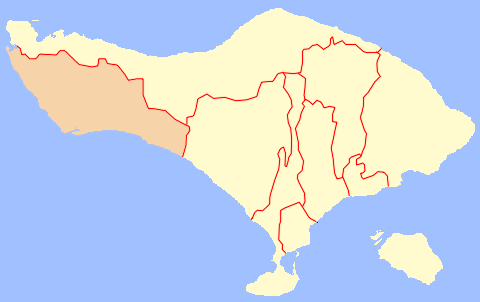
- Location within Bali

- Location in Bali Location in Lesser Sunda Islands Location in Indonesia Location in Southeast Asia Location in Asia
- Coordinates: 8°18′S 114°40′E
- Country: Indonesia
- Region: Lesser Sunda Islands
- Province: Bali
- districts: List: Melaya; Negara; Jembrana; Mendoyo; Pekutatan
- Established: 14 August 1958
- Capital: Negara

Government
  - Body: Jembrana Regency Government
  - Regent: I Made Kembang Hartawan (PDI-P)
  - Vice Regent: I Gede Ngurah Patriana Krisna
  - Legislature: Jembrana Regency Regional House of Representatives (DPRD)

Area
  - Total: 327.85 sq mi (849.13 km^{2})

Population (mid 2024 estimate)
  - Total: 329,353
  - Density: 1,004.6/sq mi (387.87/km^{2})

Demographics
  - Ethnic groups (2010): 77.50% Balinese; 10.77% Javanese; 7.70% Malays; 1.62% Bugis; 1.14% Madurese; 0.19% Sundanese; 0.12% Chinese; 0.09% Sasak; 0.06% Flores; 0.81% other
  - Religion (2024): 70.91% Hinduism; 26.72% Islam; 2.07% Christianity; 1.26% Protestanism; 0.81% Catholicism; 0.29% Buddhism; 0.01% Confucianism
  - Languages and dialects: Indonesian (official); Balinese (native); Lowland Balinese; Jembrana Balinese; Balinese Malay; Javanese other
- Time zone: UTC+08:00 (Central Indonesia Time)
- Postal code: 822
- Area code: (+62) 365
- ISO 3166 code: ID-BA-JM
- Vehicle registration: DK
- HDI (2023): ▲0.740 high
- Website: jembranakab.go.id

Jembrana Regency (Indonesian: Kabupaten Jembrana; Balinese: ᬓᬪᬹᬧᬢᬾᬦ᭄ᬚᭂᬫ᭄ᬩ᭄ᬭᬡ, Kabupatén Jĕmbŕ‌‌ana) is a regency (kabupaten) in the southwest of Bali, Indonesia. It has an area of 841.8 km^{2} and had a population of 329,353 in 2024. It is bordered by Tabanan Regency to its east, Buleleng Regency to its east and north, and the Bali Strait to its west and the Indian Ocean to its south. Its regency seat is the town of Negara.

== History ==
Based on archaeological evidence, it can be interpreted that settlements in Jembrana have existed since 6000 years ago. From a semiotic perspective, the origin of the name of a place or area refers to the names of fauna and flora. The emergence of the name Jembrana comes from the wilderness area (Jimbar-Wana) inhabited by the snake king (Naga-Raja). The mythological nature of the naming of places has become a tradition through stories passed down from generation to generation among the population.

Based on folklore and oral traditions (folklore) that emerged, inspiring the builders of traditional power institutions (kings and kingdoms) The King and his followers, namely the people from the Balinese Hindu ethnic group and from non-Balinese ethnic groups who are Muslim, have built a palace as a center of government named Puri Gede Jembrana in the early 17th century by I Gusti Made Yasa (ruler of Brangbang). The first king who ruled in the palace (Puri) Gede Agung Jembrana was I Gusti Ngurah Jembrana. In addition to the palace, the people were also given followers (wadwa), royal clothing equipped with heirlooms in the form of spears and tulup. Likewise, the heirloom keris named "Ki Tatas" to increase the authority of the kingdom. It is recorded that there were three kings who ruled in the center of government, namely in Puri Agung Jembrana.

Since the power of the kingdom was held by King Jembrana I Gusti Gede Seloka, a new Puri as the center of government was built. The palace that was built was named Puri Agung Negeri in the early 19th century which was later better known as Puri Agung Negara. It is worth noting that the kings who ruled in the Jembrana Kingdom later also centralized their government bureaucracy in Puri Agung Negara. It is also worth noting that there were two periods of government bureaucracy centered in Puri Agung Negara.

The first period was marked by the traditional royal government bureaucracy that lasted until 1855. It is recorded on the government archive document sheets of the Gubernemen that the autonomous Jembrana kingdom was occupied by King Jembrana V (Sri Padoeka Ratoe) I Goesti Poetoe Ngoerah Djembrana (1839–1855). During his reign, a bilateral friendship agreement was signed between the royal government and the Dutch East Indies Colonial government (Gubernemen) on June 30, 1849.

The second period was then replaced by a modern bureaucracy, through regional governance (Regentschap) which was part of the Banyuwangi Residency administrative area. The Regentschap regional government was headed by a native leader (Regent) as an official included in the Modern Colonial Gubernemen bureaucratic structure centered in Batavia. The status of regional government (Regentschap) lasted for 26 years (1856–1882).

During the Jembrana VI Kingdom, I Gusti Ngurah Made Pasekan (1855–1866) experienced two status changes, namely 1855–1862 as King of Jembrana and 1862–1866 as Regent (Regent) the seat of the kingdom was in Puri Pacekan Jembrana. When the reorganization of regional government was implemented based on Staatblad Number 123 of 1882, the administrative areas of Bali and Lombok were given the status of separate administrative areas of Residency. The Residency areas of Bali and Lombok were divided again into two regions (Afdelingen), namely Afdeling Buleleng and Afdeling Jembrana based on Staatblad Number 124 of 1882 with one capital city, Singaraja.

Since then, the names of the capital city began: Singaraja for the Bali and Lombok Residency and its sub-districts in the Buleleng Afdeling, and Negara for the Jembrana Sub-district. The emergence of the names Jembrana and Negara until now, has its own meaning from a historical perspective. The inherited name has been in the pages of history since it was used as the name of the Puri, namely Puri Gede / Agung Jembrana and Puri Agung Negeri Negara. Because Puri is the center of the bureaucracy of the traditional kingdom government, it can be said that Jembrana and Negara are Puri built in the early 18th century and the early 19th century are types of Hindu-style royal cities.

Jembrana as a kingdom that also filled the pages of history of eight kingdoms (asta negara) in Bali. Since July 1, 1938, the Jembrana Region (Afdeling, regentschap) and also other afdeling regions (Onder-afdeling, regentschap) in Bali were designated as autonomous regions (Zelfbestuurlandschapen) each headed by a Zelfbestuurder (King).

The King in the Jembrana Swapraja (Anak Agoeng Bagoes Negara) and the Kings in other autonomous regions throughout Bali had previously declared their loyalty to the Government. Anak Agung Bagoes Negara held the reins of government in the Jembrana autonomous region continuously for 29 years despite changes in the state system. His leadership in Jembrana lasted the longest compared to the leadership held by previous officials.

During his leadership, two names, namely Jembrana with its capital Negara, were always etched in the history of the government in Jembrana, both in the period of the Japanese Occupation (1943–1945), the period of the Republic of Indonesia which only lasted a few months (1946–1950) and when returning to the period of the form of the State of East Indonesia (1946–1950) and when returning to the period of the Unitary State of the Republic of Indonesia (1950–1958).

It can be said that, since the title of "Bupati" who heads the government in the Jembrana Level II Region was first implemented in 1959 until now, the name "Negara" as the capital of the Jembrana Regency Region has been preserved.

== Geography ==
Jembrana Regency is one of 9 (nine) Regencies and Cities in Bali Province. Jembrana Regency is located in the western part of the island of Bali, stretching from West to East at 8°09'30"–8°28'02" LS and 114°25'53"–114°56'38" BT. The total area of Jembrana Regency is 841.80 km^{2} or 84,180 Ha.

=== Borders ===
The boundaries of Jembrana Regency are as follows:

=== Northern ===
- Buleleng Regency

=== Southern ===
- Indian Ocean

=== Western ===
- Bali Strait

=== Eastern ===
- Tabanan Regency

=== Topography ===
The topographic conditions of the Jembrana Regency area include mountainous areas in the north and lowlands (coastal) in the south bordering the Indonesian Ocean. The central part is an urban area. Based on the slope gradient, the Jembrana Regency area can be classified into four (4) groups, namely:

1. Areas with a slope gradient of 0–2% (flat), spread across all sub-districts of Jembrana Regency, especially in Jembrana District and Negara District.
1. Areas with a slope gradient of 2–15% (gentle), spread across almost all sub-districts in Jembrana Regency.
1. Areas with a slope gradient of 15–40% (undulating/hilly), spread across almost all sub-districts in Jembrana Regency.
1. Areas with a slope gradient of >40% (steep to very steep), are the largest part of the total area of Jembrana Regency.

The northern part of Jembrana Regency has a mountainous morphology and physiography formed by the Penginuman mountain range, Mount Klatakan, Mount Bakungan, Mount Nyangkrut, Mount Sanggang and Mount Batas. The altitude varies between 250 and 700 m above sea level. Meanwhile, the southern part of Jembrana Regency has a relatively flat to undulating topography with altitudes ranging from 1–250 m above sea level.

=== Geology ===
Geologically, Jembrana Regency consists of volcanic rocks consisting of lava, breccia, tuff, which are estimated to be from the crater quaternary and plain areas, some of which are rice fields formed from rocks that are combined and called the Palasari Formation consisting of sandstone, conglomerate and reef limestone and are estimated to be from the quaternary, while for coastal areas in general alluvium deposits consisting of sand, silt, clay and gravel, which are found around the coastal areas in Pengambengan, Tegalbadeng, Perancak, Yeh Kuning, Mendoyo and on Gilimanuk beach.

The Jembrana Regency area is composed of five types of rocks, namely

- Gamping Agung Formation
- Jembrana Volcanic Rock
- Palasari Formation
- Alluvium Formation
- Alluvium Sorga Formation

There are 17 mountains in Jembrana Regency, including inactive mountains. Of these, Melaya District has the most mountains, so the topography in Melaya District is hilly. Of the 17 mountains found in Jembrana Regency, it turns out that Mount Merbuk is the highest mountain (1,386 m above sea level) in Jembrana Regency, located in Jembrana District, followed by Mount Mesehe (1,300 m above sea level) in Mendoyo District, Mount Bangul (1,253 m above sea level) in Negara District, and Mount Lesung (1,047 m above sea level) in Mendoyo District.

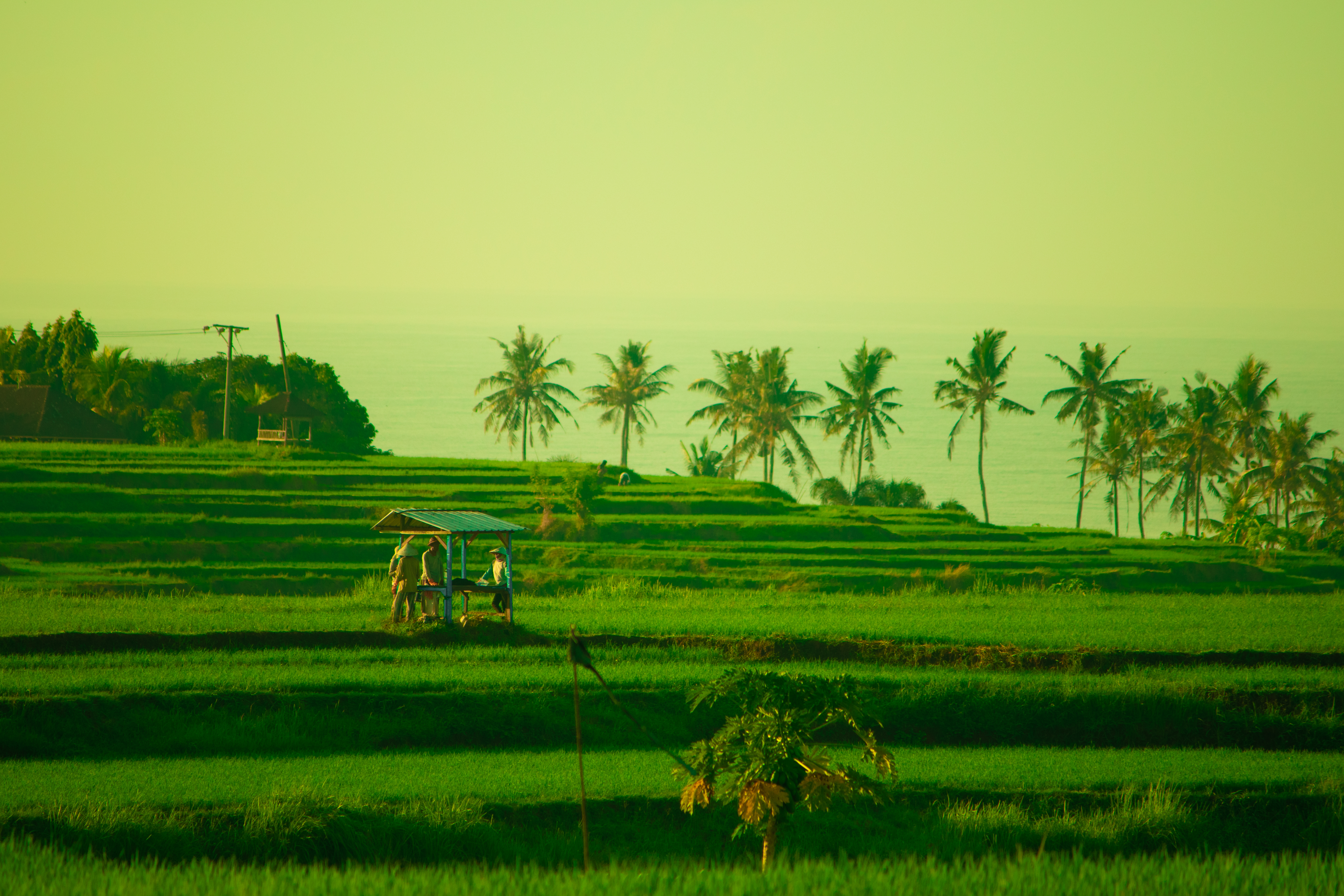
Rice fields in Melaya village, Negara, Jembrana district

The types of soil in Jembrana Regency consist of:

1. Brown Latosol and Litosol (Inceptisol) Soil, This type of soil is spread across five areas of Jembrana Regency, the largest of which is in Mendoyo District (25,985 ha), in Melaya District (16,319 ha), Negara and Jembrana Districts (14,130 ha), and Pekutatan District (12,169 ha).
2. Gray Brown Alluvial Soil, this type of soil is river sediment with an area of approximately 10,750 Ha, most of which are found in Negara District and Jembrana District (5,725 ha).
3. Gray Brown Regosol Soil, this type of soil is mostly found in Negara District and Jembrana District covering an area of 772 ha and in Mendoyo District covering an area of 648 ha. This soil is formed by an intermediate volcanic parent with a sloping to wavy shape.
4. Alluvial Hydromorphic Soil, this type of soil is found in Negara District and Jembrana District, especially along the southern coast and around Pengambengan Village and Cupel Village. The area of this type of soil is approximately 1,420 Ha. This soil is land and sea sediment formed by sand plates and coral fragments.

=== Climate ===
The air temperature in Jembrana Regency varies between 19°–33 °C, for hilly and mountainous areas the temperature can usually be less than 19 °C. The relative humidity level in this area also varies every month between 75%–81%. Jembrana Regency has a tropical monsoon climate (Am) with two seasons influenced by the movement of the monsoon winds, namely the rainy season influenced by the blowing of the humid and wet west monsoon winds and the dry season influenced by the dry and cold east-southeast monsoon winds. The dry season in the Jembrana region occurs in the period of May–September, which is the period when the east-southeast monsoon winds blow, and the peak of the dry season occurs in July. Meanwhile, the rainy season in Jembrana Regency occurs in the wet months of November–March and the peak of the rainy season occurs in January with a monthly rainfall of more than 290 mm per month. Annual rainfall in Jembrana Regency ranges from 1,300 to 1,900 mm per year with the number of rainy days ranging from 80 to 140 rainy days per year. In addition to these two seasons, there is also a transitional season which is the transition season between the rainy season and the dry season or vice versa and this season occurs in the months of April and October.

Climate data for {{{location}}}
Month	Jan	Feb	Mar	Apr	May	Jun	Jul	Aug	Sep	Oct	Nov	Dec	Year

== Government and politics ==
No.	Regent	Start of office	End of office	Vice Regent
18	I Made Kembang Hartawan	February 20, 2025	Incumbent	I Gede Ngurah Patriana Krisna

The current regent in Jembrana Regency is I Made Kembang Hartawan, accompanied by the vice regent I Gede Ngurah Patriana Krisna. They won the 2024 Jembrana regency election, and were inaugurated on February 20, 2025.

=== Administrative districts ===
The Regency is divided into five districts (kecamatan), listed below from west to east with their areas and their populations at the 2010 Census and the 2020 Census, together with the official estimates as at mid 2024. The table also includes the locations of the district administrative centres, the number of administrative villages in each district (totaling 41 rural desa and 10 urban kelurahan), and its postal codes.

Kode Wilayah	Name of District (kecamatan)	Area in km^{2}	Pop'n 2010 Census	Pop'n 2020 Census	Pop'n mid 2024 Estimate	Admin centre	No. of villages	Post code
51.01.04	Melaya ^{(a)}	229.62	50,381	61,494	64,183	Melaya	10 ^{(b)}	82252
51.01.01	Negara	97.56	77,812	95,539	100,074	Baler Bale Agung	12 ^{(c)}	82218 ^{(d)}
51.01.05	Jembrana (district)	89.58	51,634	61,812	63,982	Dauhwaru	10 ^{(e)}	82218 ^{(f)}
51.01.02	Mendoyo	297.41	56,222	67,536	70,003	Pergung	11 ^{(g)}	82261
51.01.03	Pekutatan	134.96	25,583	30,483	31,111	Pekutatan	8	82262
	Totals	849.13	261,638	317,064	329,353	Negara	51	

Notes: (a) including the small offshore islands of Pulau Buring and Pulau Kalong. (b) including the kelurahan of Gilimanuk.
(c) comprising 4 kelurahan (Baler Bale Agung, Banjar Tengah, Lelateng and Loloan Barat) and 8 desa.
(d) except four villages with different post codes - Baler Bale Agung (postcode of 62212, with 12,110 inhabitants in mid 2023),
Banjar Tengah (postcode 62213, with 6,243 inhabitants), Lelateng (postcode 62214, with 10,963 inhabitants) and Loloan Barat (postcode 62215, with 5,056 inhabitants).
(e) comprising 4 kelurahan (Dauhwaru, Loloan Timur, Pendem and Sangkaragung) and 6 desa.
(f) except the villages of Pendem (62211) and Loloan Timur (62216). (g) including the kelurahan of Tegal Cangkring.

Districts in Jembrana Regency

Melaya district

Negara district

Jembrana district

Mendoyo district

Pekutatan district

=== Jembrana District ===
The ten villages are Air Kuning, Batu Agung, Buteng, Dangin Tukadaya, Dauhwaru, East Loloan, Pendem, Perancak, Sangkararung, Yehkuning (Yeh Kuning).

Perancak is the place where Nirartha purportedly landed upon arriving in Bali, around 1492. The temple called Pura Gegé Perancak commemorates this event.

=== Melaya district ===
Its ten villages are Belimbingsari (or Blimbingsari), Candikusuma, Ekasari, Gilimanuk, Manistutu, Melaya, Nusasari (or Nusa Sari), Tukadaya, Tuwed and Warnasari.

A part of West Bali National Park is on Gilimanuk, Melaya and Belimbingsari territories.

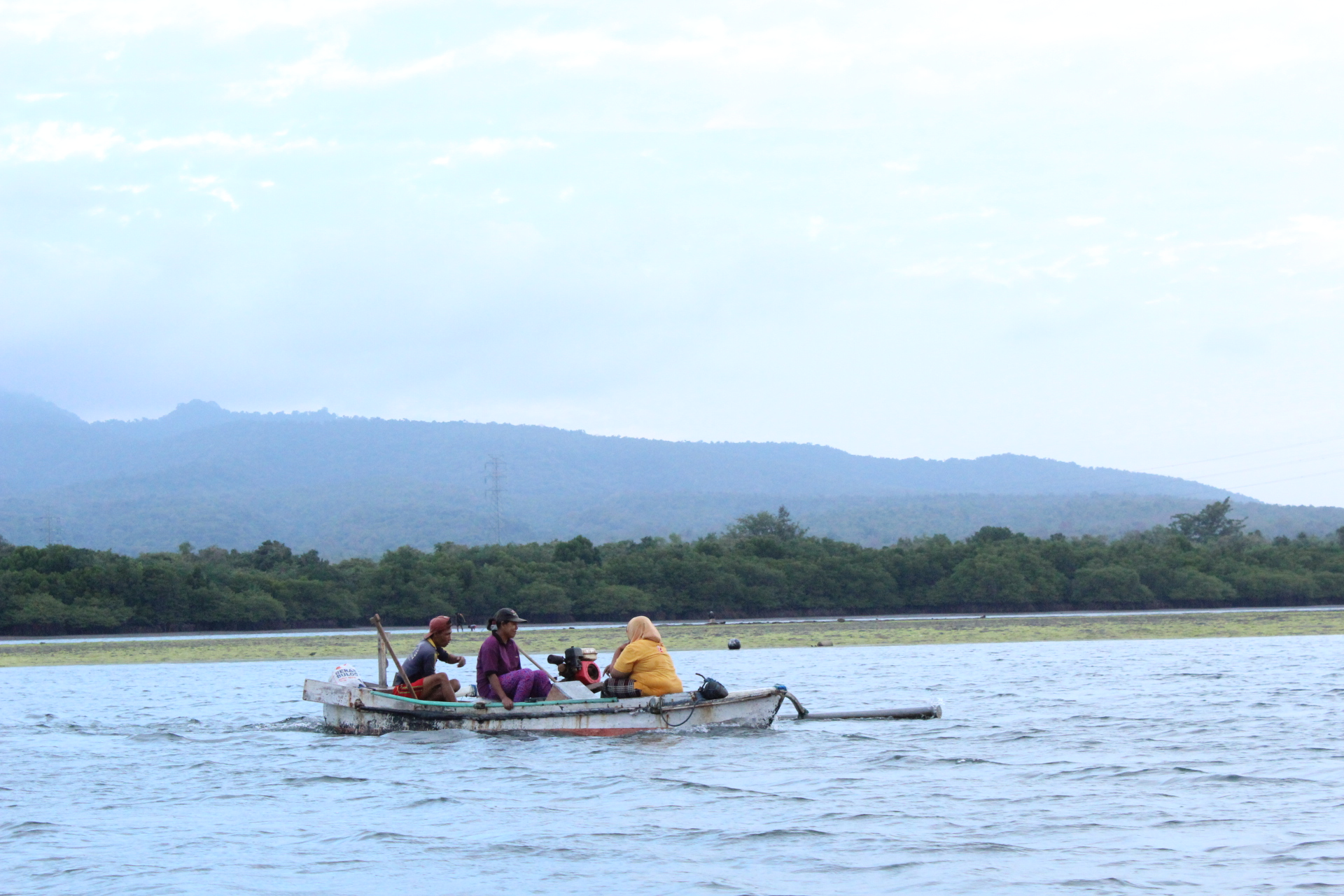
Fishing in Gilimanuk Bay

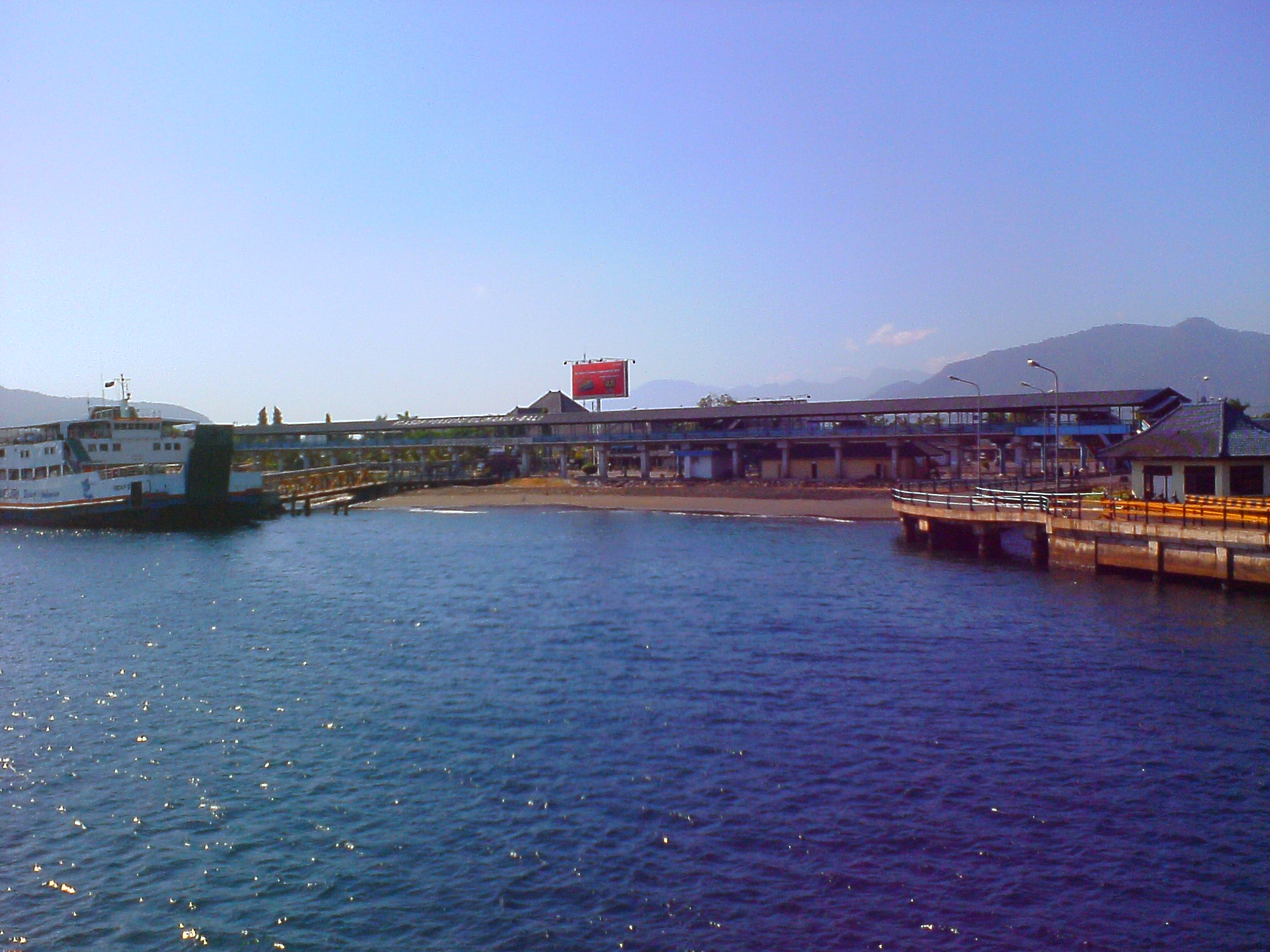
Gilimanuk port

=== Palasari and Belimbingsari ===
This district includes the two christian communities, founded on land given by the colonial administration to stop conflicts between newly converted Christians and their original social environment: Belimbingsari ("essence of the star fruit"), founded with 39 families in November 1939; and Palasari ("the place of the nutmeg trees") - which later became a quarter in Ekasari - in September 1940 with 18 people from the village of Tuka and 6 people from Gumbrih (who started the village with a core of 24 families), all fleeing Gianyar.

The land, covered with wild jungle and very much a virgin territory, was then known as Alas Rangda, the forest of the evil-witch Rangda. Nevertheless, the settlers perceived it as a "promised land". There have been economic difficulties in managing agricultural land, notably in the late 60s to early 70s; scarcity of water is a factor, another is that many residents have only limited agricultural land. Some villagers decided to relocate elsewhere in Indonesia. A study in 1990 notes that these two villages "stand in marked contrast to the adjacent Bali-Hindu desa of Nusasari, where the 'work-ethic' is less evident."

In 2020 Palasari, a Catholic village that still maintains the local culture, (Note: For example the custom of the penjors, or rather pepenjorans (ornaments similar to penjors) as Christmas trees: "Les fêtes chrétiennes balinaises marquées par l'inculturation". missionsetrangeres.com (in French). December 24, 2022.) has 388 families and a population of 1,350. Palasari has the Catholic Church of the Sacred Heart. It has become the seat of a pilot project for a successful Catholic mission.

Belimbingsari has the Jemaat (congregation) "Pniel" church, largest Protestant church in Bali (Gereja Kristen Protestan di Bali or GKPB) and the center point of the village. Its original church did not look like a Balinese temple; but an earthquake destroyed it in 1971, and it was rebuilt in the local style and now can easily be mistaken for a Hindu temple - with the addition of some crosses on the roof, and a large signboard near the main antrance. It integrates the principles of kosala-kosali, (Note: kosala-kosali, similar to feng shui, is a complex system of architecture deeply intertwined with Balinese culture and spirituality. Its rules are described in a lontar known as Kosala Kosali, dating from the arrival of the Aryans from the Majapahit kingdom to Bali. It results in an architecture called Bali Arya's architecture.) respecting the rules about the cardinal directions in relation to the human anatomy and, in accordance with that principle, its intermediate zone includes supporting buildings (bale kulkul - where the kulkul, or drum from a hollowed tree trunk, replaces the bell - and bale bengong); it applies the principle of tri angga, in harmony with the orientation concept; it uses a fence (penyengker) and barrier walls (kori agung) with Balinese decorative carvings; the main area of the building is divided according to traditional Balinese temple architecture; Balinese carvings adorn the aling wall, completing its fonction as a repellant to negative energies; many other features follow the same architectural directives as that of a Balinese temple, including its ornaments, as well as the way services are conducted: during the service the villagers wear ceremonial clothes traditionally worn in Hindu temples, and gamelan music accompanies the liturgies. This earned it the nickname "Pura Gereja" or "Temple of Church". The World Council of Churches has saluted it as one of the most unique churches of the world.

Belimbingsari has seen significant progress in sanitation, security, economy, and population growth. both local and foreign tourists increasingly visit the village. In 2017 it won the national Community Based Tourism Award for the best community-based tourism village, and the government has formed a team dedicated to Blimbingsari tourism. 85 homestays have been opened in and around the village. But in 2020 health care is still a problem.

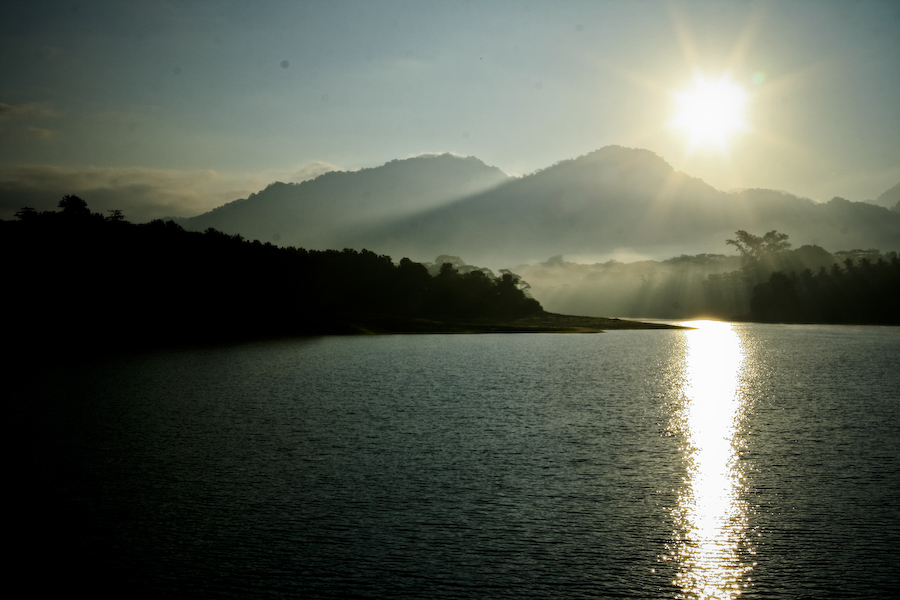
Pala Sari reservoir

Pala Sari reservoir

East of Eka Sari is the largest dam in Bali; it retains the Pala Sari reservoir and serves as flood control, irrigation, fisheries and recreation. It is also part of a tourism development plan concerning Eka Sari that also includes Palasari Old Church and Goa Maria, and cocoa agrotourism.

=== Mendoyo district ===
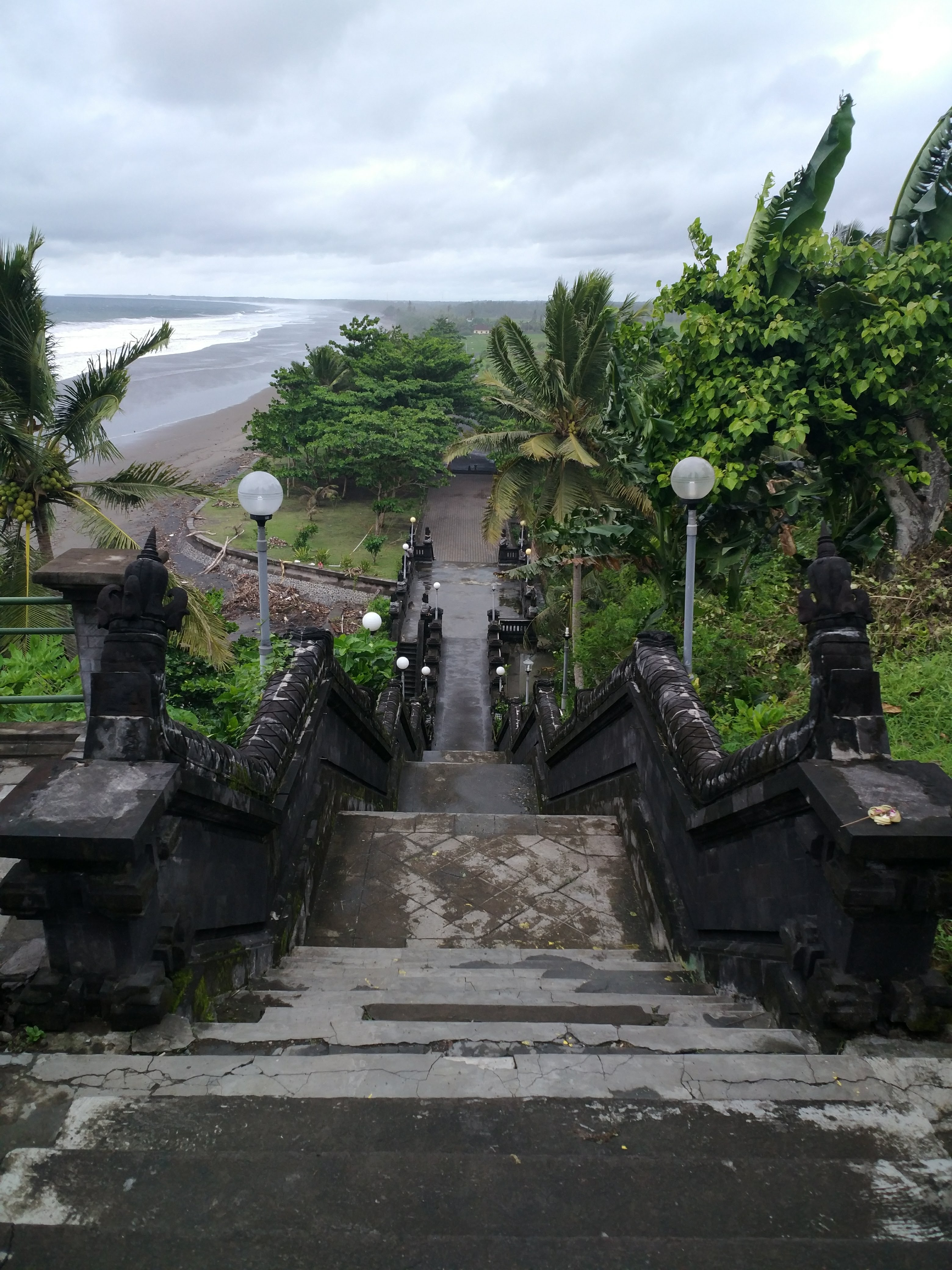
Pura Rambut Siwi Temple, stairs to the beach, looking west

Its eleven villages are Delodberawah (Delod Berawah), Mendoyo Dangin Tukad, Mendoyo Dauh Tukad, Penyaringan, Pergung, Pohanten, Tegalcangkring (Tegal Cangkring), Yeh Sumbul, Yehembang (Yeh Embang), Yehembang Kangin (Yeh Embang Kangin), Yehembang Kauh (Yeh Embang Kauh).

Rambut Siwi Temple is on Yeh Embang Kangin territory, between Yeh Satang and Yeh Embang. overlooking the beach, 500 m south off the coastal road between Pulukan (3,5 km) and Jehembang (2 km). Mendoyo, the district capital, is 10 km west. It is the biggest temple in the Jembrana regency. The word rambut means "hair", an allusion to the legend that Nirartha left a lock of his hair to protect the temple.

=== Negara district ===
Its twelve villages are Baler Bale Agung, Baluk, Banyu Biru (Banyubiru), Berangbang, Central Banjar, Cupel, East Tegal Badeng, Kaliakah, Lelateng, Pengambengan, West Loloan, West Tegal Badeng.

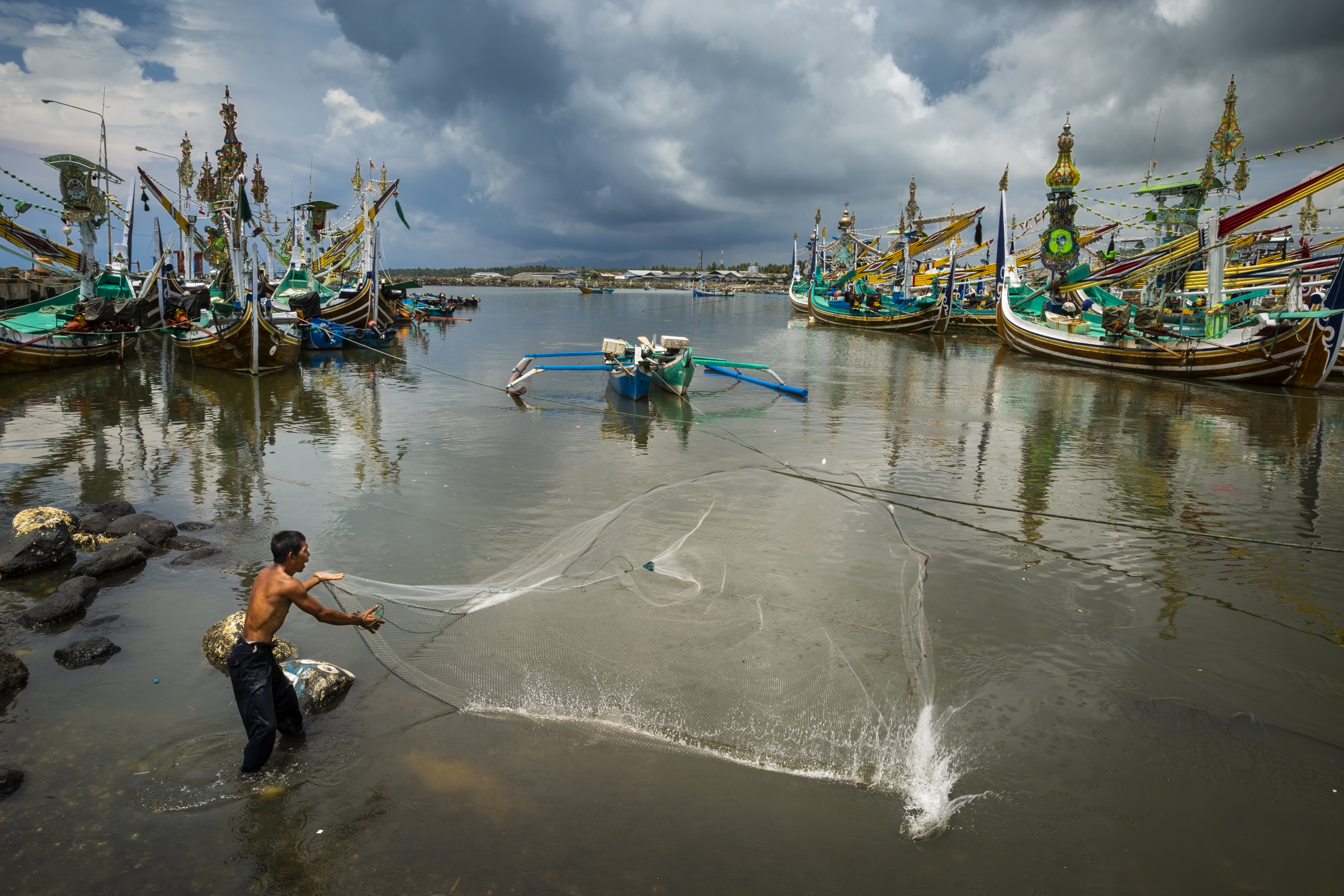
Fisherman in Pengambengan port

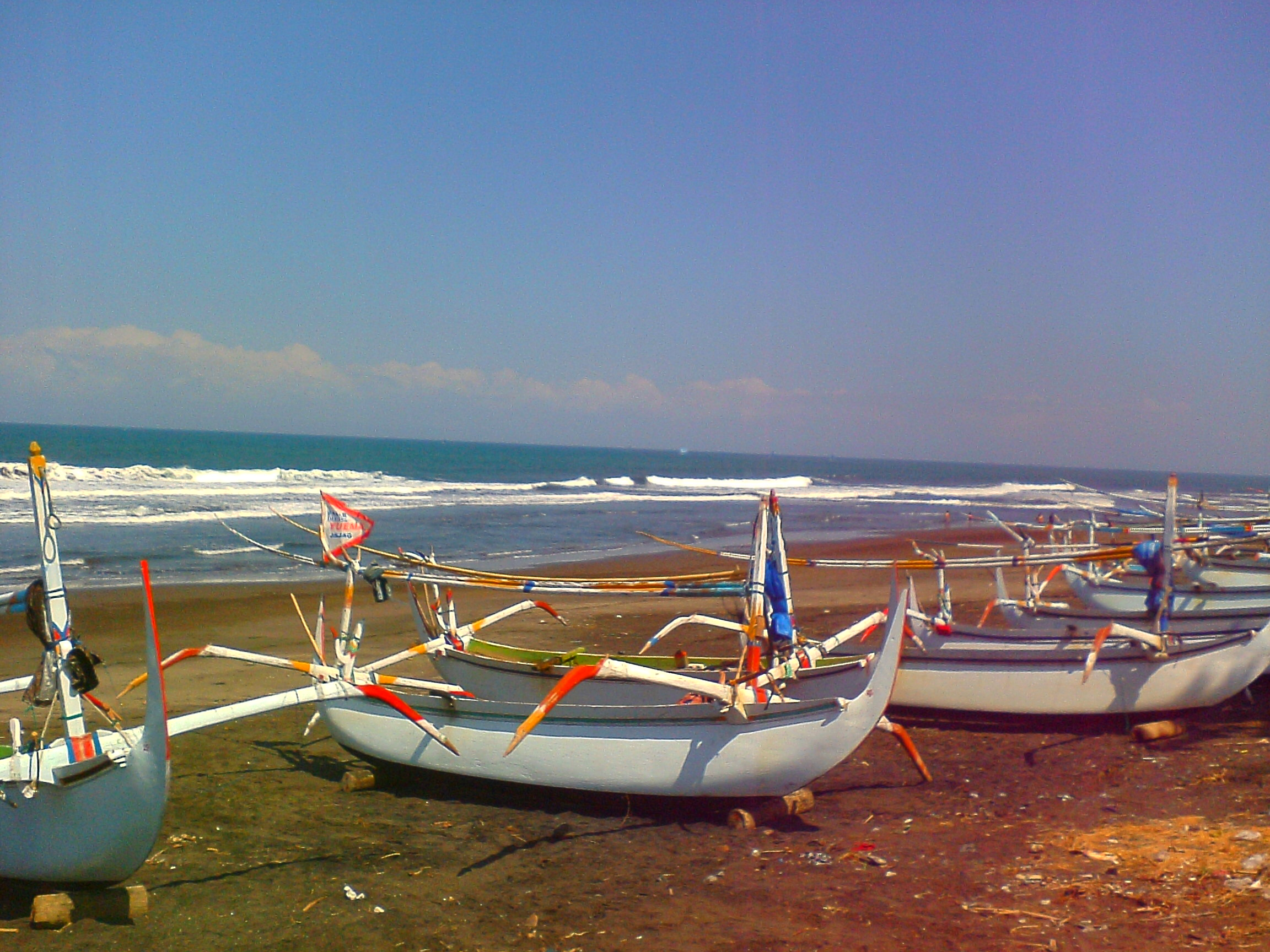
Cupel

=== Pekutatan district ===
Its eight villages are Asahduren, Gumbrih, Manggissari, Medewi, Pangyangan, Pekutatan, Pengeragoan (Pengragoan), Pulukan.

In front of the Puri Dajuma Resort in Pekutatan, is a concrete memorial to I Gusti Ngurah Rai, who landed at that spot in 1946 with 95 men to fight the Dutch colonials.

The road from Pekutatan going north towards Pupuan, passes through a tunnel made by the aerial roots of a multisecular banyan tree (and not, as often said, through the hollowed trunk). The tree, called Bunut Bolong, stands between Asahduren and Manggissari, 9 km from Pekutatan. It is considered as sacred and there are two shrines at the foot of the tree on its south side.

The Juwuk Manis twin waterfall is also on Manggissari territory.

== Demographics ==
=== Ethnic groups ===
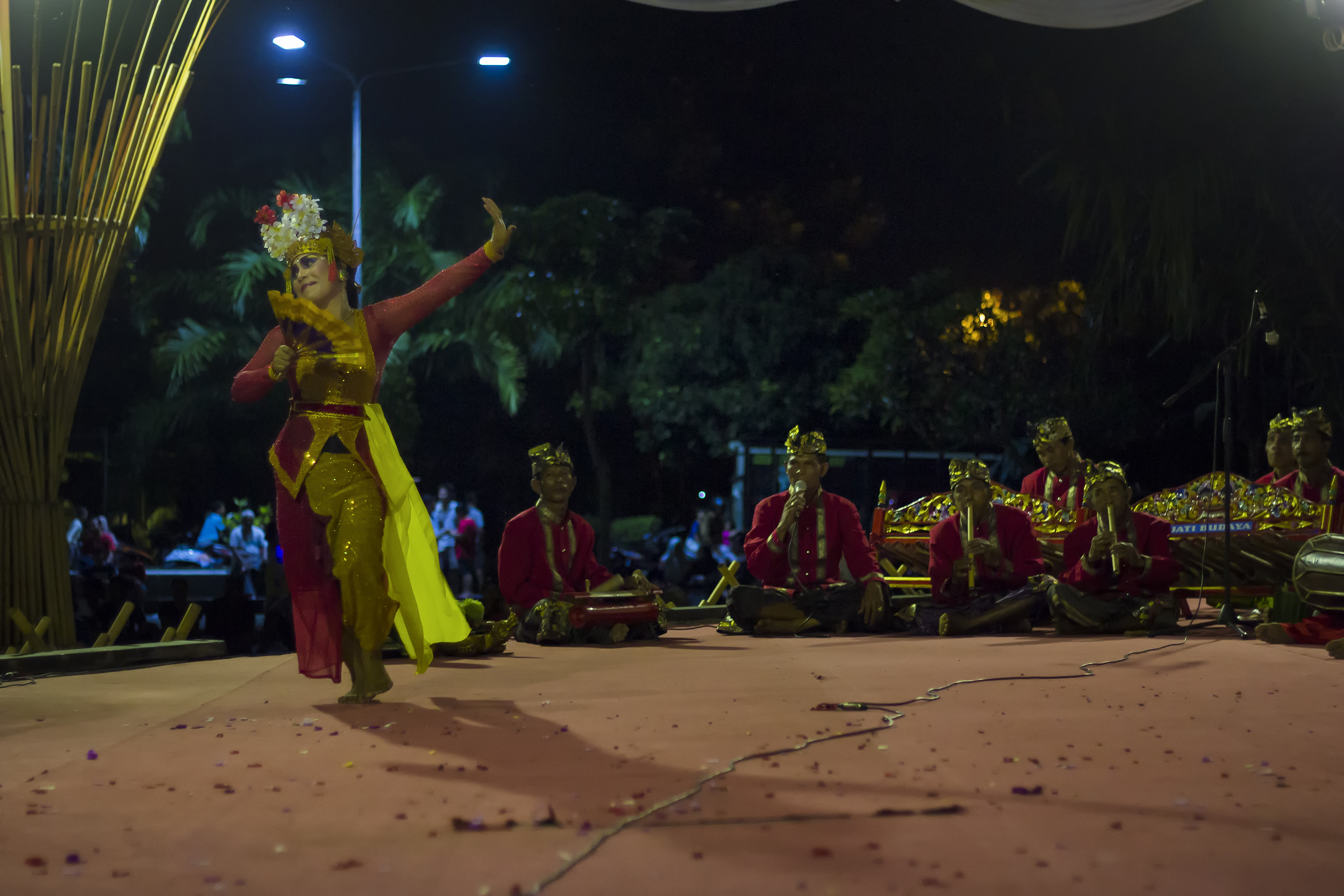
Berko art, a gamelan art typical of Balinese in Jembrana

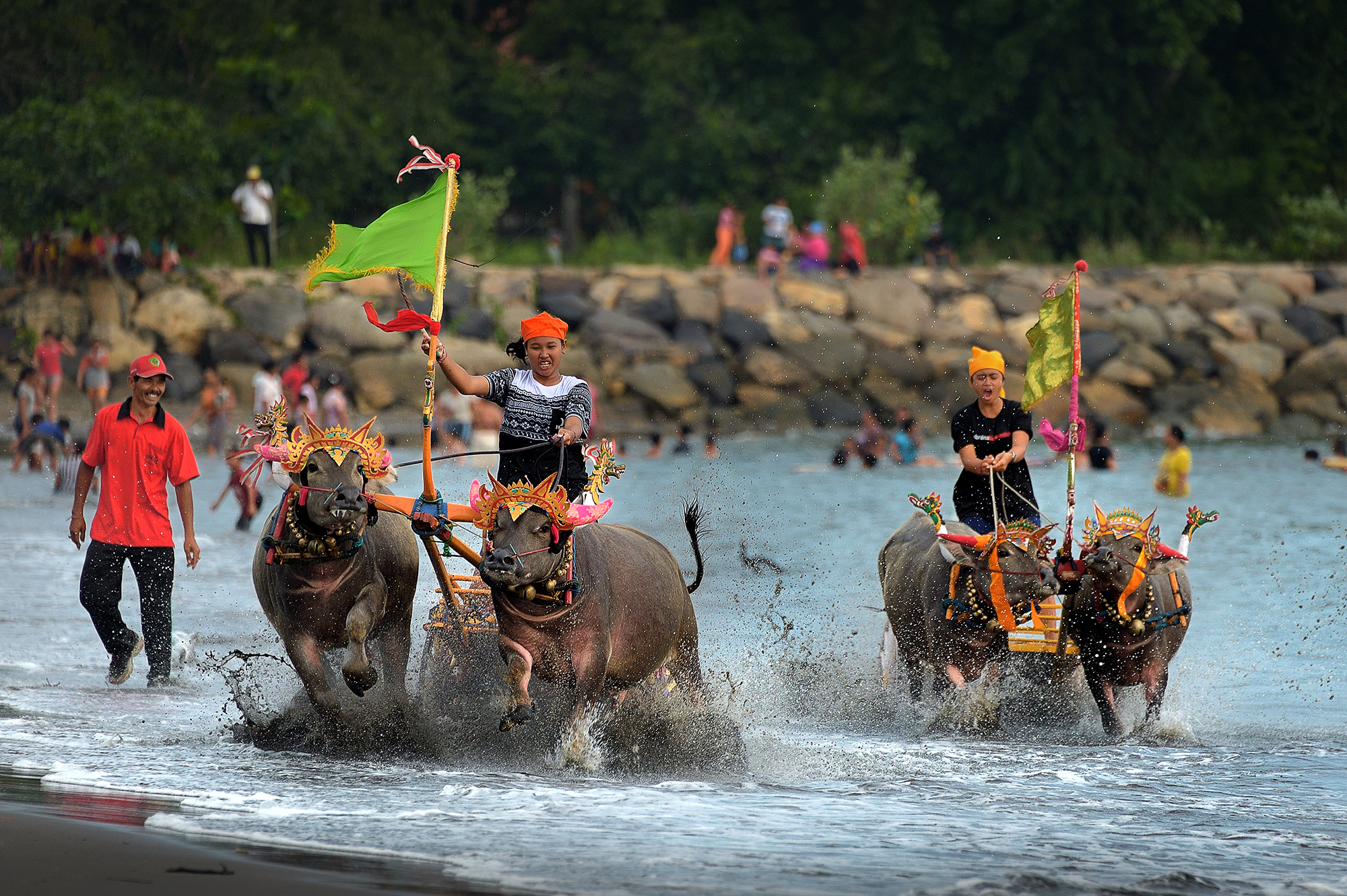
Makepung Tradition in Jembrana, riding a cart with a pair of buffalo.

Bali Province is home to the Balinese and Bali Aga ethnic groups, as is the case in this regency. Based on data from Central Bureau of Statistics in Indonesian Population Census 2010, as many as 202,777 people or 77.50% of the 261,638 people of Jembrana Regency are of the Balinese people. The population of Jembrana from other tribes, many come from the Javanese ethnic, and some are Malays, Bugis, Madurese, Chinese, Sasak, Flores, Batak, and several other ethnic groups.

The following is the population of Jembrana Regency based on ethnicity in 2010:

No.	Ethnic groups	Pop. (2010)	Pct. (%)
1	Balinese	202,777	77.50%
2	Javanese	28,180	10.77%
3	Malays	20,150	7.70%
4	Bugis	4,228	1.62%
5	Madurese	2,984	1.14%
6	Sundanese	490	0.19%
7	Chinese	321	0.12%
8	Sasak	231	0.09%
9	Flores	164	0.06%
10	Others	2,113	0.81%
	Jembrana Regency	261,638	100%

=== Religion ===
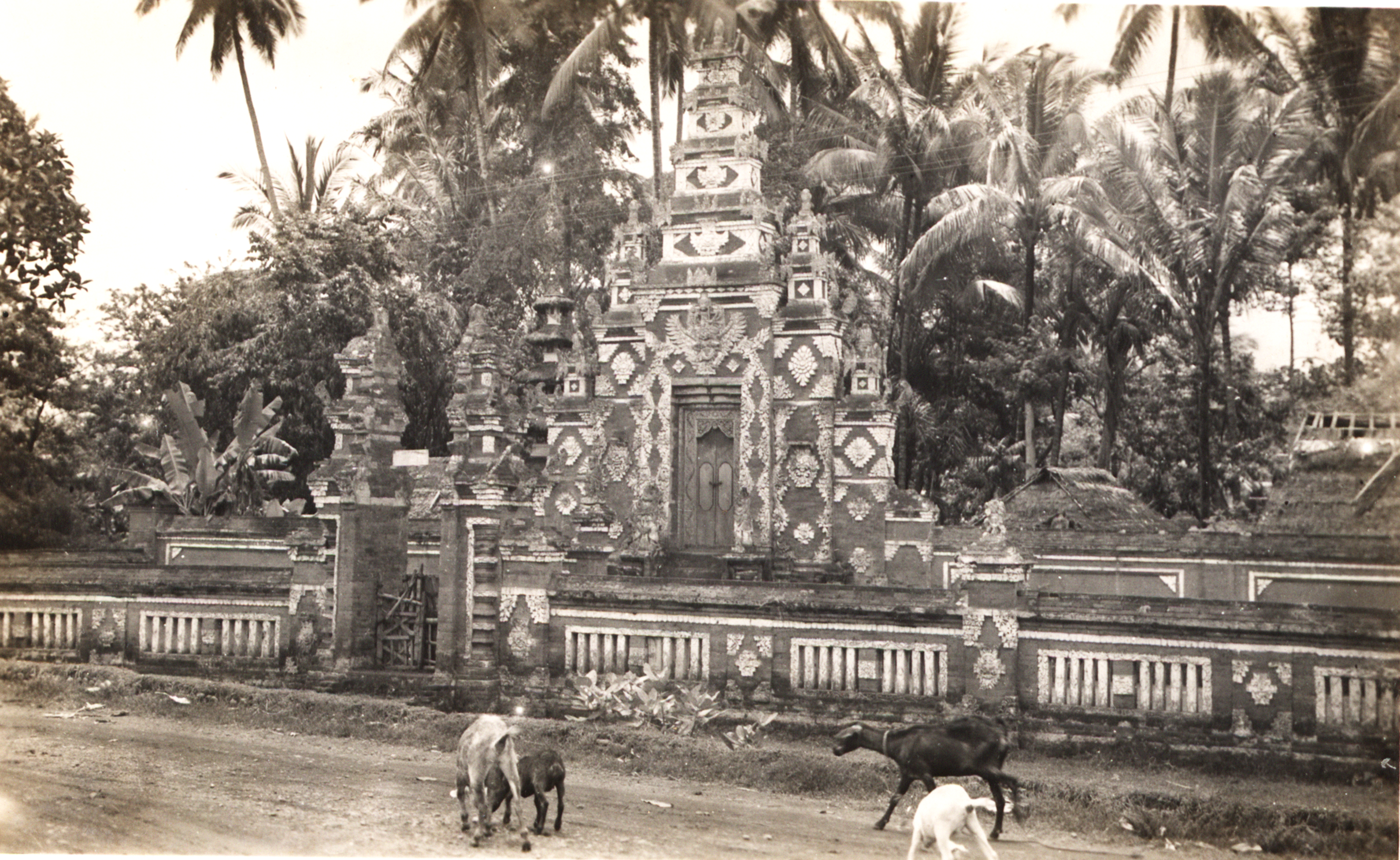
A Temple in Jembrana in 1935

The religions practiced by the people of Jembrana Regency are very diverse with the majority being Hindu. The Balinese people are mostly Hindu, and some are Christian and Islam. Meanwhile, the population of the Javanese, Malay, Bugis, Sundanese are generally Islam. Some people of Flores, Batak, and some Chinese are Christian.

Based on data from the Ministry of Home Affairs in 2024, as many as 70.91% of the population of Jembrana adheres to the Hinduism religion. Then the population of Islam is 26.72%. The rest are Christian as many as 2.07%, of which Protestant as many as 1.26% and Catholic as many as 0.81%. The population of Buddhism is 0.29%, and Confucianism is less than 0.01%. For places of worship, there are 912 temples, then 63 mosques, 105 prayer rooms, 34 Protestant churches, 3 Catholic churches and 7 monasteries.

== Products and economy ==
In 2018, Jembrana's agricultural sector produces rice, soybean, banana, coconut, cloves, coffee, cocoa, beef, buffalo, and sea fishing. The manufacturing industry covers copra and coconut cooking oil industry, rice milling unit, fish canning, brick making, fish processing, tempe and tofu making, various chips, powder coffee processing, cag-cag weaving (Note: Cag-cag is the hand loom used to weave songket. See Pebryani, Nyoman Dewi; Ratna, Tjok Istri C.S.; Prihatini, Putu Manik (2022). "Design Application for Balinese Songket Weaving Motif". Mudra. 37 (3): 312–318. doi:10.31091/mudra.v37i3.2025..) (hand loom).

The main tourism attractions are West Bali National Park, Madewi Beach, Palasari dam, Rambut Siwi temple, and Bunutan agrotourism.

== Culture ==
=== Buffalo racing (makepung lampit) ===
The word kepung means "to chase", and lampit is "the plow". The tradition of buffalo racing celebrates the rice harvest. It started with farmers racing each other to bring the rice from the fields back to the farm.

The jockeys or sais used to wear a headband (destar), shawl and sling (selempod), and a sword tucked in their belt, all of it as reminders of the dress of ancient Balinese royal warriors. These days there is no sword and they wear long-sleeved batik shirts. Since the 1960s, the races are no longer carried out with plows in wet mud but on paths among the rice fields. This modification occurred at the same time as the formation of the Makepung organisation, with the creation of two groups, namely the Regu Ijo Gading Timur, bearing a red flag; and the Regu Ijo Gading Barat bearing a green flag. The ploughs are gone and the jockeys ride in their stead small, light carts pulled by a pair of buffalos elaborately adorned. To minimize the risks, the race is in a line: the teams start one after the other with an equal distance between each team, and there usually is no overtaking. At the end of the race, the spacing between each team determines the winner: if the gap has widened, the first team wins; if it has reduced, the second team wins. The starting distance between tems is usually 10 m.

The Makepung season generally starts in July and ends in November, across various circuit locations. In Jembrana Regency there are seven circuits: Sangyang Cerik near the village of Tuwed, Tuwed (Melaya district), Delod Berawah (Mendoyo district), Pangkung Dalem (7 km west of Negara), Kaliakah (Negara district), Merta Sari (just south of Negara) and Awen (just south-west of Lelatang, Negara district). The teams run several races until the final governor's cup: "Jembrana Regent's Сup". The races occur generally on Sundays and usually start in the early mornings, around 7:30 am, and last some 5 hours. In Negara, the races are located 10 km south of town, in Perancak, each 28 of the month between July and November, gathering some 250 participants (pepadu) each year.

The races are usually followed by the Buffalo Fashion Show, with hundreds of buffaloes entirely adorned in elaborate attire, vying for the best-dressed title; makepung dances to the sound of jegog musical instruments; dangdut orchestra, bumbung dance and occasionnally cockfighting.

This series of events has now become a cultural spectacle and a significant contributor to the region's tourism industry - all the more important in the remote west. It also helps preserving traditional farming practices while stimulating the advance in animal husbandry practices. No less important, makepung is one of the traditions that strengthen relations between Hindus and Muslims, the latter adopting that tradition as a mark of respect for their host land when they arrived in that area. Thus both socio-religious groups participate, which fosters togetherness.

Buffalo race (Makepung lampit) in Jembrana

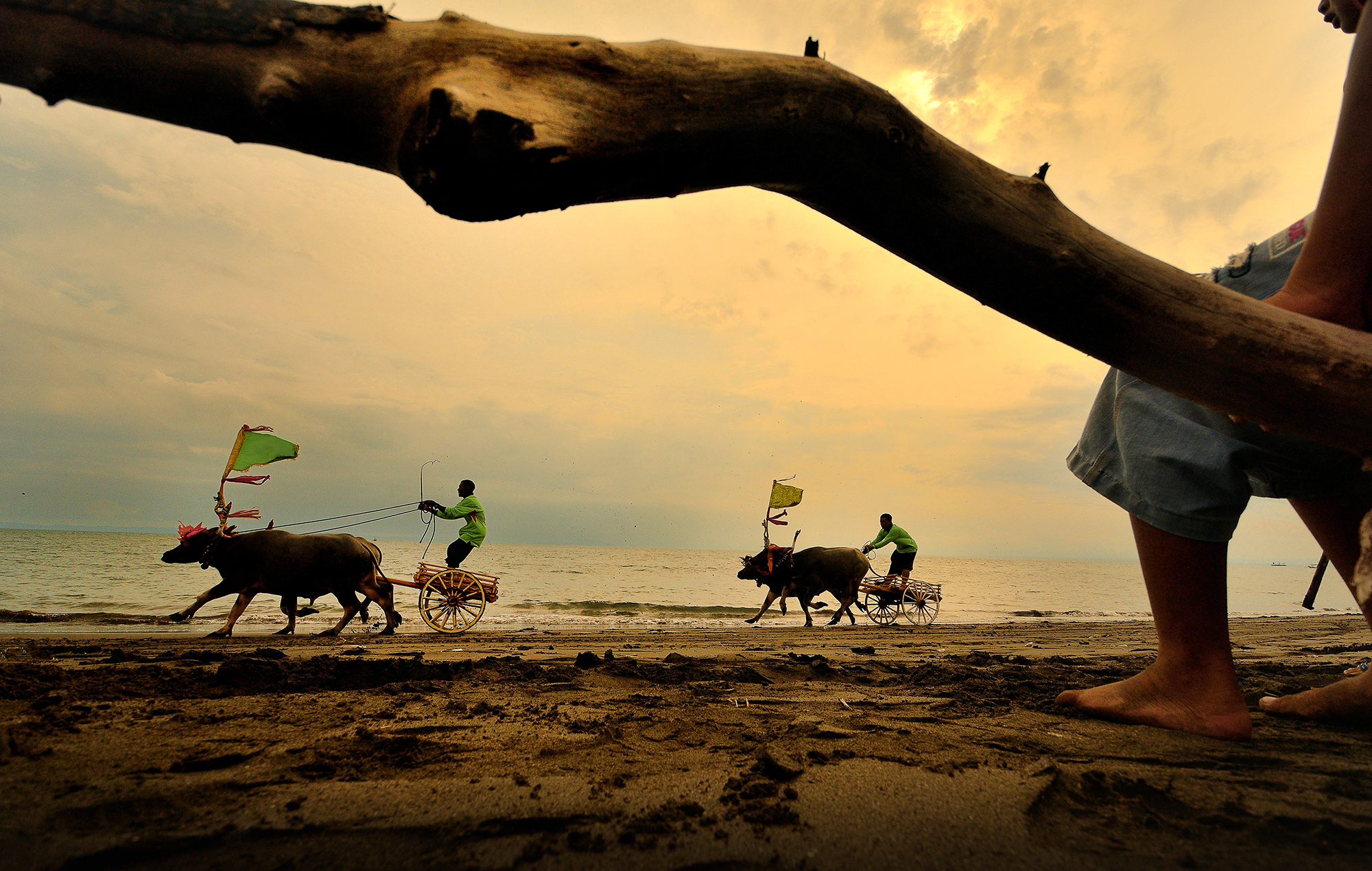
February 29, 2020

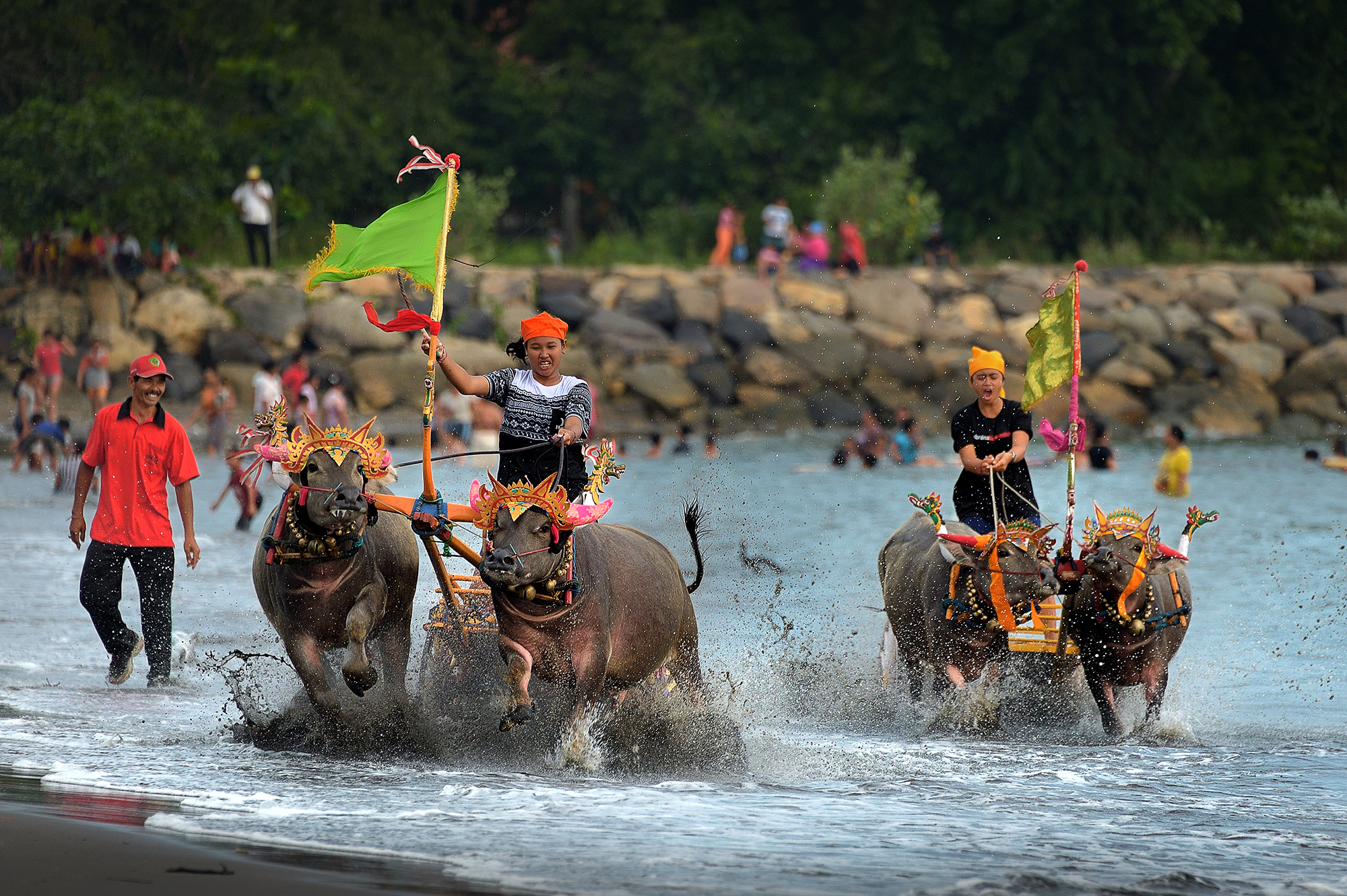
February 29, 2020

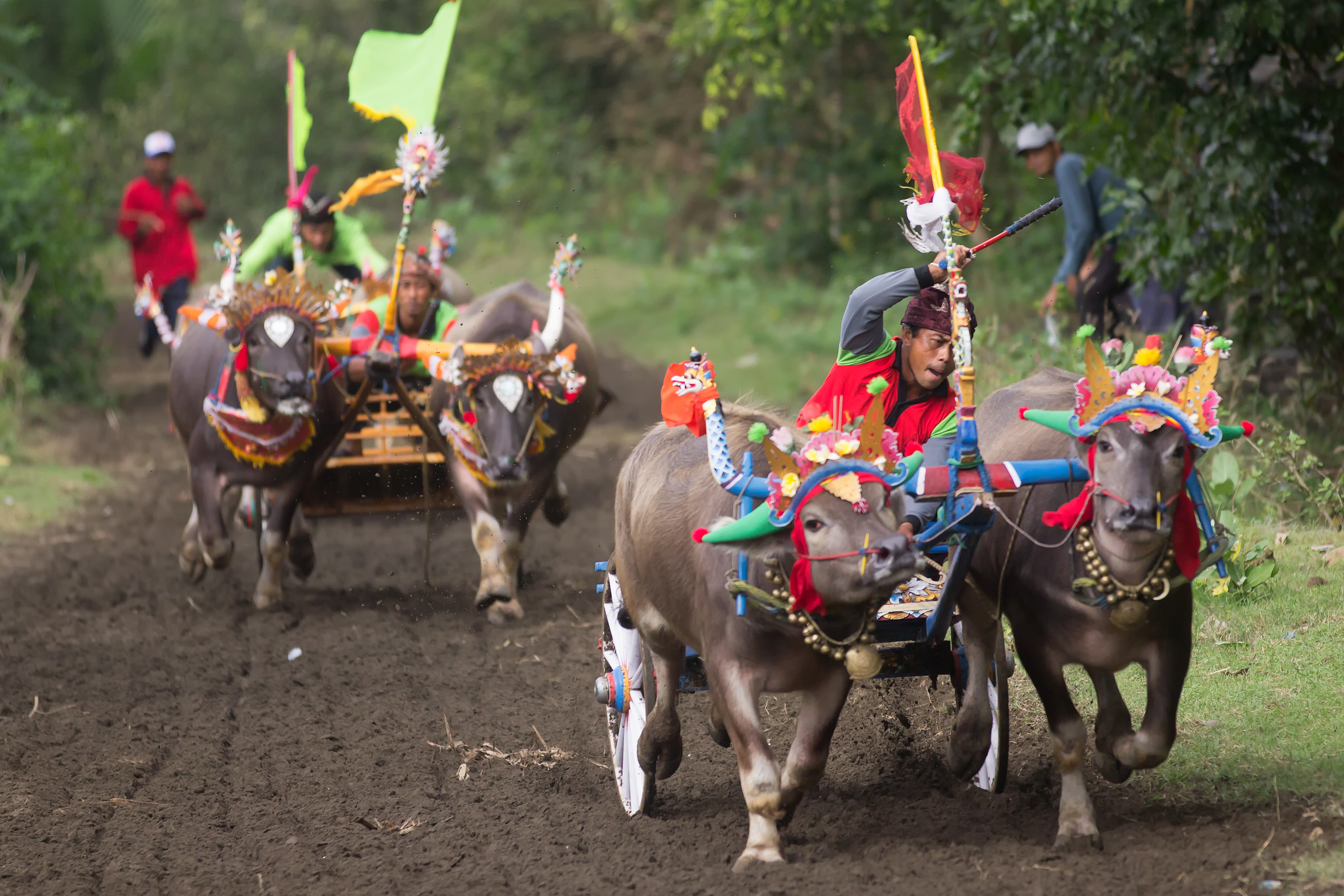
July 30, 2017

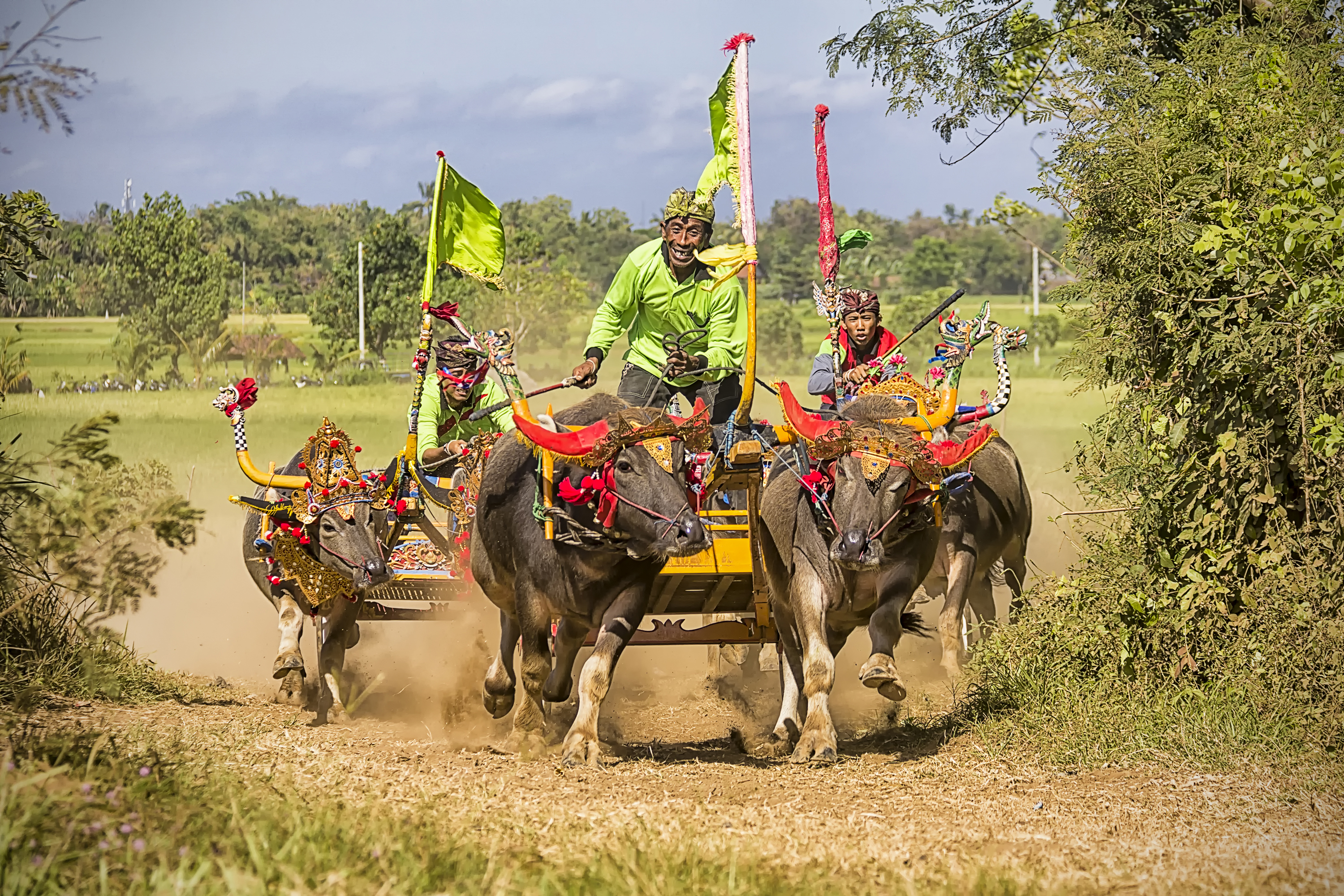
September 11, 2016

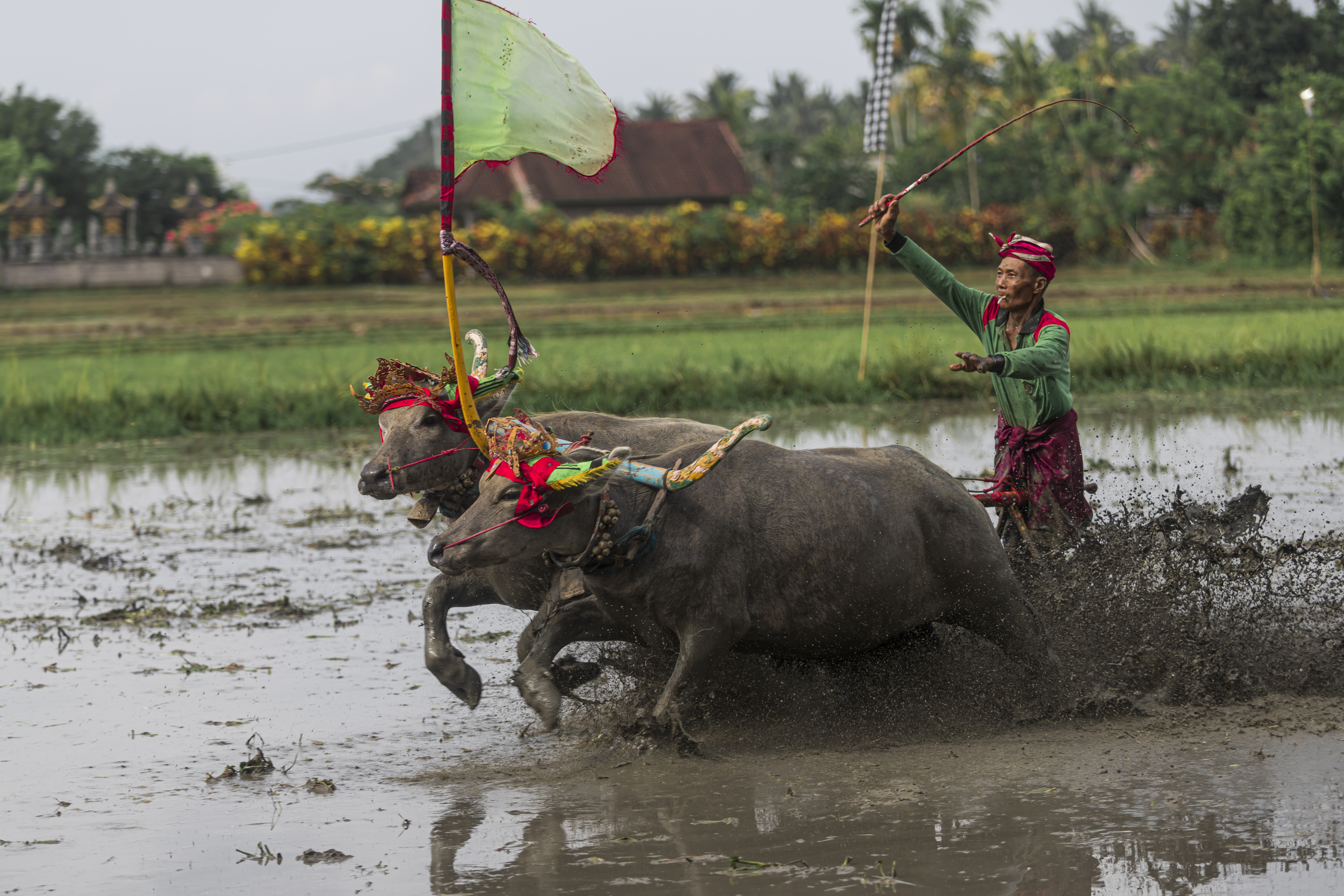
November 13, 2022

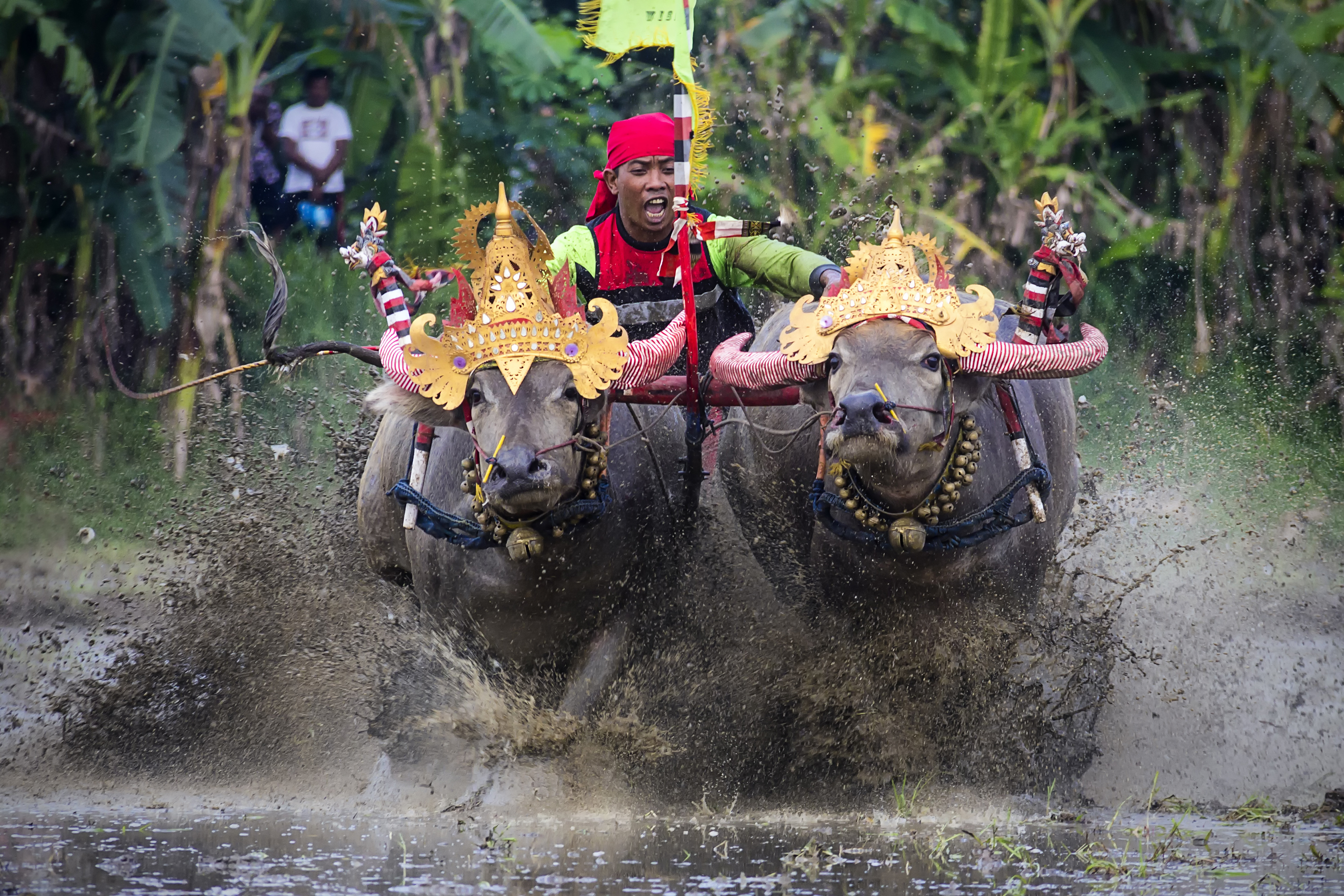
November 26, 2017

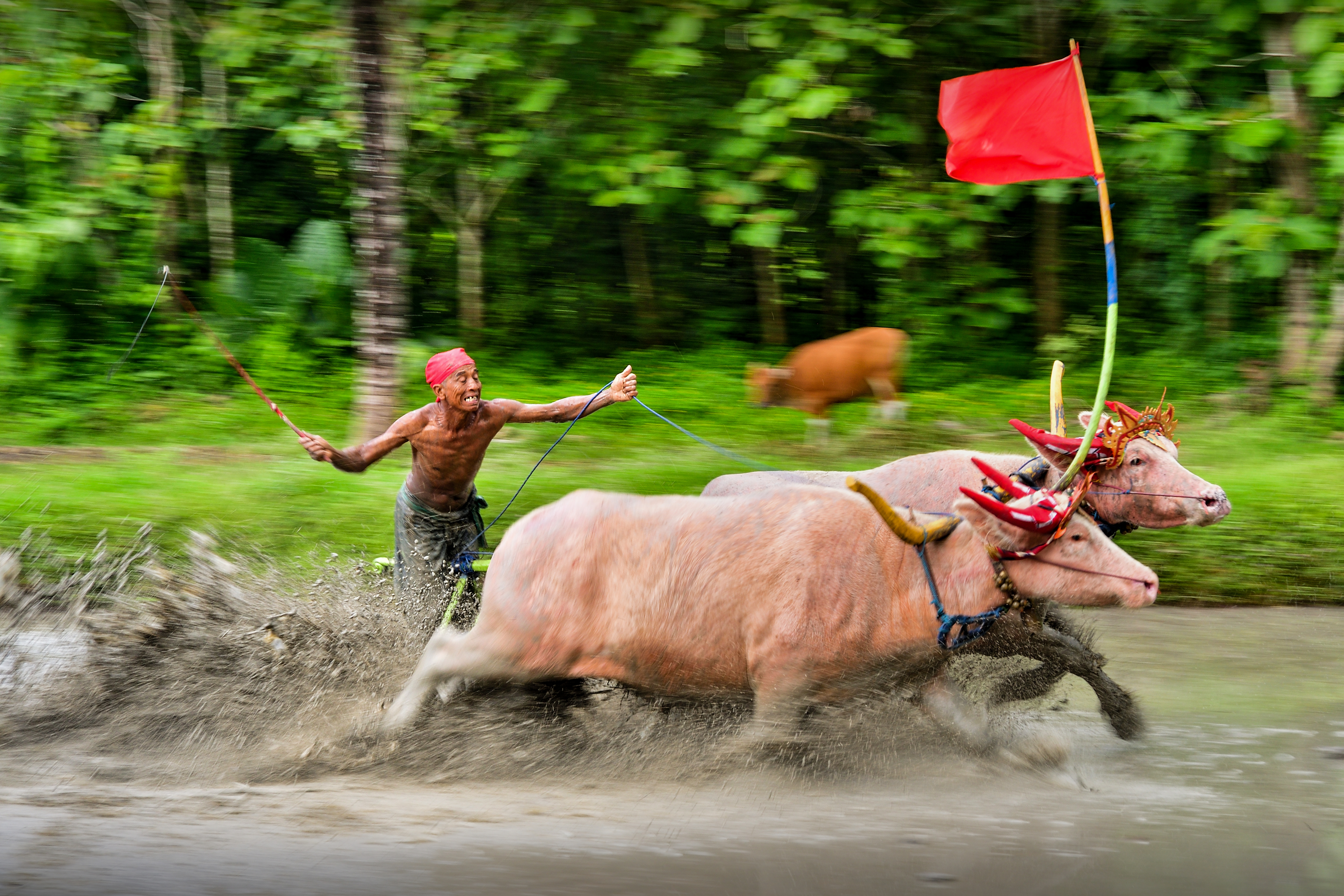
November 28, 2020

== Tourism ==
Tourism is the mainstay of the economy of Jembrana Regency.

Some of the tourist attractions in Jembrana Regency:

- Rambut Siwi Temple
- Jati Temple
- Majapahit Temple
- Baluk Rening Beach
- Delod Berawah Beach
- Perancak
- West Bali National Park
- Palasari Dam
- Medewi Beach
- Tukad Gelar
- Benel Dam
- Bunut Bolong
- Pengeragoan Beach
- Gilimanuk Bay
- Gilimanuk Shiva Mahadewa Park
- Juwuk Manis Waterfall
- Jagatnatha Park and Temple
- Pecangakan Park

=== Other places ===
Part of West Bali National Park is in the north-west point of this district.

== Gallery ==
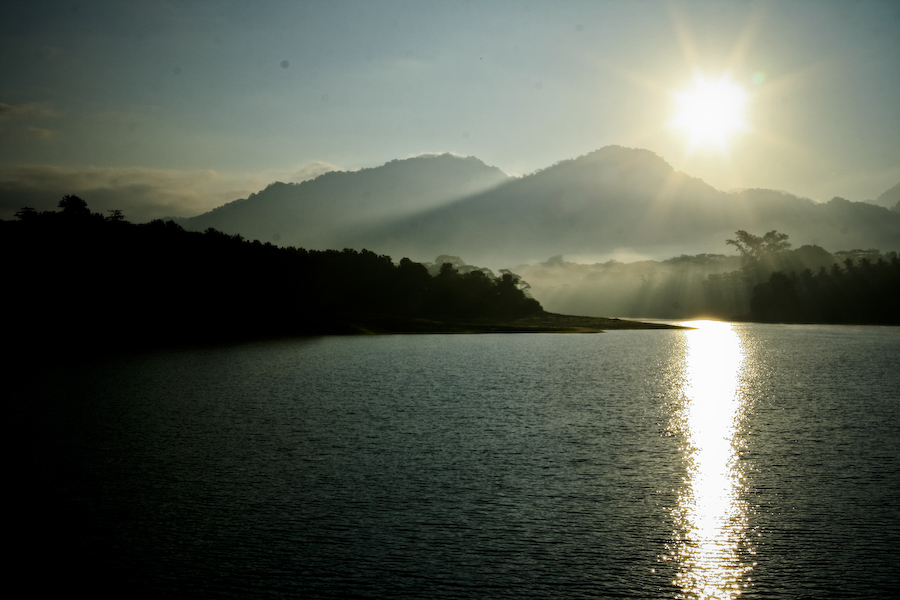
Palasari Dam

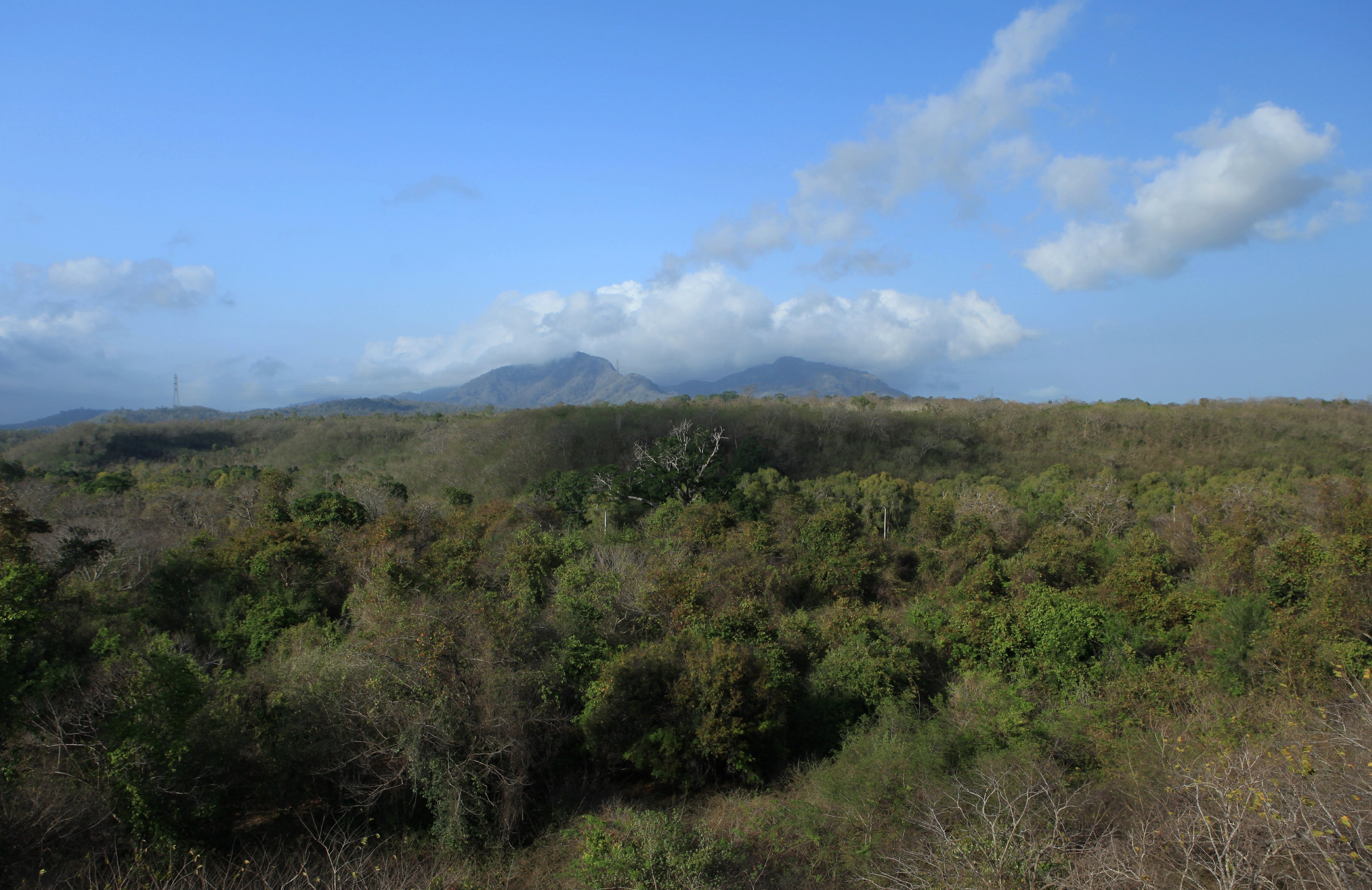
West Bali National Park

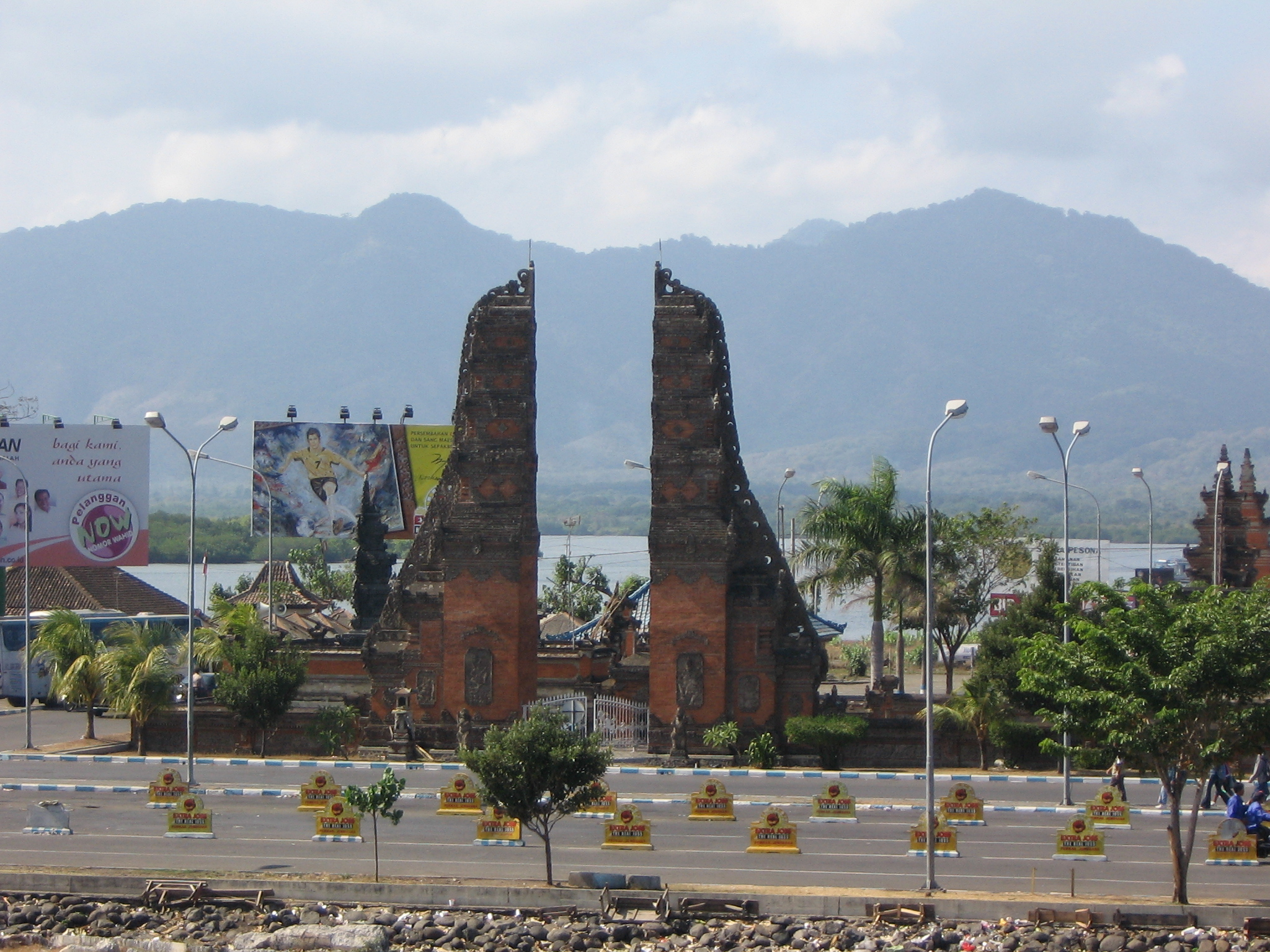
Gilimanuk Port
