= National Biomedical Imaging Archive =

Open-source software

National Biomedical Imaging Archive (NBIA) is an Open-source software Web application managed by the United States National Cancer Institute (NCI) intended to create searchable repositories of in vivo images. The software is described in detail and can be downloaded from the NBIA wiki. A re-factoring analysis which examined the current status of development and future strategies was completed in 2015 and published on the NCI wiki. A demo instance of NBIA is deployed at https://wiki.nci.nih.gov/x/UYOhH. Initially this was leveraged by NCI's Cancer Imaging Program to support the data sharing needs of the cancer imaging research community, but most of that data has been migrated to The Cancer Imaging Archive (TCIA). TCIA continues to leverage the NBIA software as part of its infrastructure.
