= North Bali International Airport =

Proposed airport in Indonesia

North Bali International Airport Bandar Udara Internasional Bali Utara
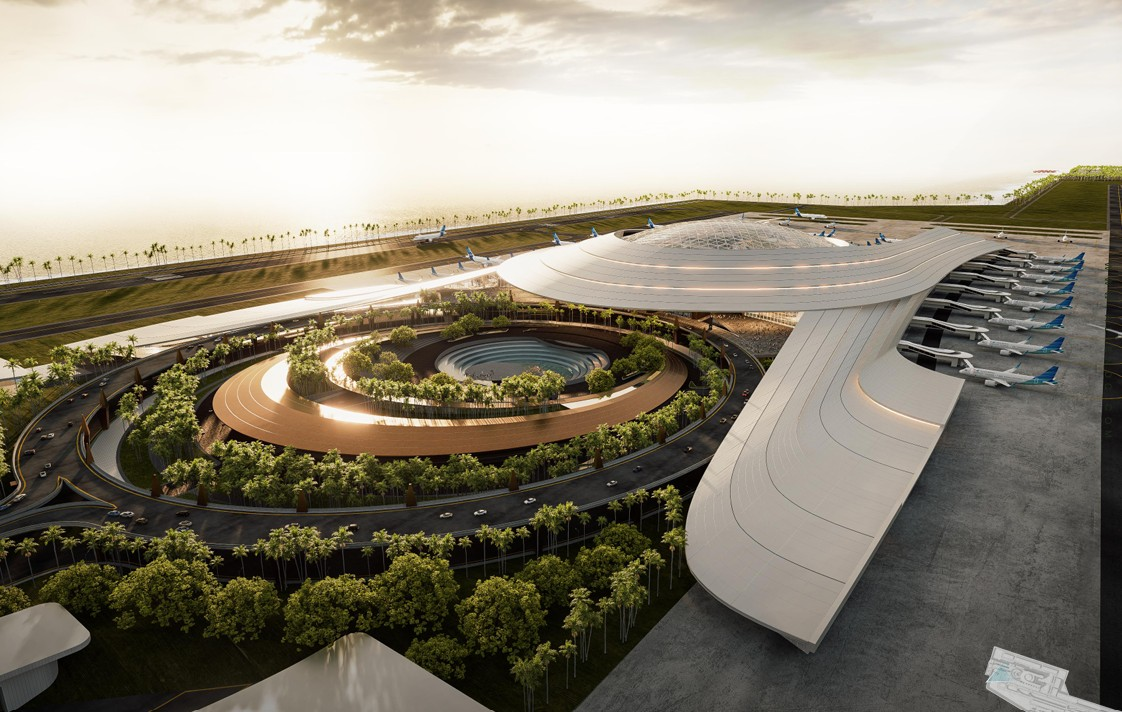
- IATA: none; ICAO: none

Summary
- Airport type: Public
- Owner: Kinesis Capital & Investment
- Operator: PT Bandara Internasional Bali Utara
- Location: Sumber Klampok, Buleleng Regency, Bali, Indonesia
- Elevation AMSL: 26 ft / 8 m
- Coordinates: 8°3′28.318″S 115°12′14.337″E

Map
- Location of airport in Bali / Indonesia NBIA (Indonesia) NBIA (Southeast Asia)

North Bali International Airport (Indonesian: Bandar Udara Internasional Bali Utara; commonly abbreviated as NBIA), is a proposed airport on the island of Bali, Indonesia, to be constructed at Sumber Klampok Village in Buleleng. Initiated by the Governor of Bali, I Made Mangku Pastika, on 9 July 2015, it was initially planned to be constructed in Kubutambahan. After being removed from the Government Priority List by President Joko Widodo in July 2022, the project was reprioritised by the Prabowo government in 2024, and shifted to the current planned location.

== Airport ==
With a capacity of up to 50 million passengers, NBIA is planned to be Indonesia's second largest airport. Built entirely on the sea, the site is divided into two parts: the Aerotropolis and the airport. The latter consists of a main terminal and three boarding satellites, and has two parallel runways, a heliport and a seaport. The site also includes a cargo terminal and maintenance area.

== Planning ==
=== The beginnings ===
The Ministry of National Development Planning has included in its PPP Book 2013 (Public - Private Partnerships), a programme for the development of a new airport in North Bali under project code D-001-10-004.

This project consists of relieving congestion at Ngurah Rai International Airport. Bali Province is one of Indonesia's largest tourist attractions. The only airport, located in the South, welcomed nearly 20 million passengers in 2017 and is expected to grow by 8% the following year. The local government considered that a new airport will reduce traffic congestion in Denpasar municipality and Nusa Dua district.

=== 2015 ===
After studying several concepts, the Governor of Bali selected an airport at sea project in his letter of recommendation No. 553/11583/DPIK of 9 July 2015.

This project proposes to develop a THKON Aerotropolis in Kubutambahan in the Buleleng Regency. THKON comes from the term Tri Hita Karana. It is a new urban development strategy in accordance with an ancient Balinese tradition based on quality of life.

=== 2018 ===
The project of construction on the sea was the culmination of many political debates which led to an extension of the feasibility studies. The subject of the debates is equity between North and South Bali. The Governor asks for a balance in the development plan of the two zones.

In March 2018, the Coordinating Minister of Maritime Affairs, Luhut Panjaitan, gave the go-ahead for a feasibility study at the chosen location.

At the same time, expansion of the existing airport as well as transport links between the north and the south of the island are being prioritised by the Transport Minister, Budi Karya Sumadi.

=== 2024 ===
Indonesian State-Owned Enterprises Minister Erick Thohir on Nov. 21, 2024, said he expected construction of an international airport in North Bali to begin from 2027.

=== 2025 ===
Indonesian Minister of People's Empowerment Coordination Muhaimin Iskandar on July 6, 2025, said President Prabowo Subianto approved construction of the North Bali International Airport.

=== 2026 ===
The company behind the project, PT BIBU Panji Sakti, confirmed that it partnered with South Korea-based transportation and infrastructure company S-Transport Co., Ltd to develop the digital ecosystem for the airport and surrounding infrastructure.

== See also ==
- Jembrana City International Airport
