= List of beaches in Indonesia =

Beaches in Indonesia

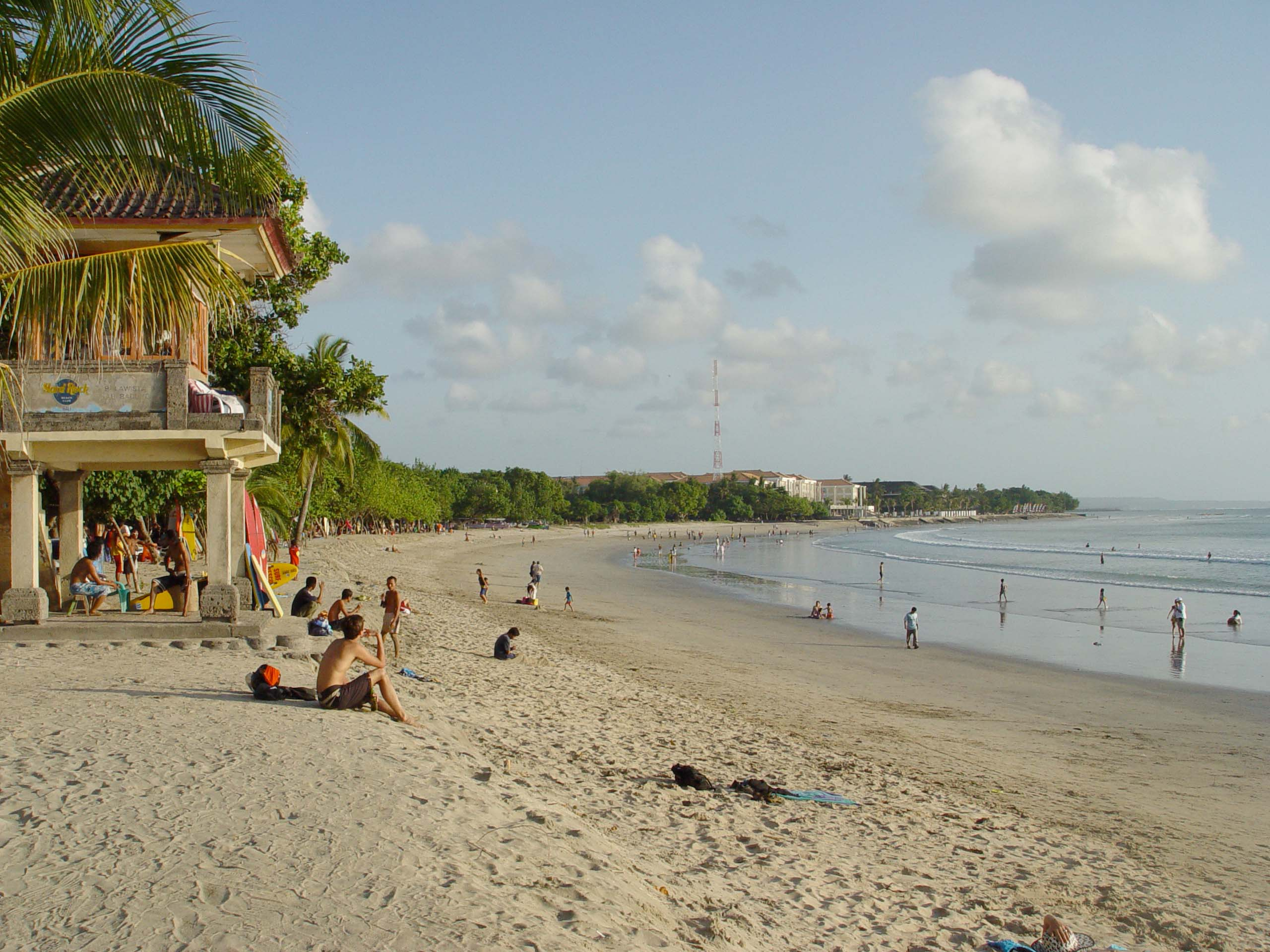
Kuta Beach in Bali.

Beaches in Indonesia are extensive, characterized by coral reefs, deposits from volcanoes, rich marine biodiversity, strong ocean currents, and associated with diverse cultural traditions. With around 17,500 islands, Indonesia has an intricate coastline of over 80,000 km (50,000 mi), the fourth longest in the world.

Indonesia is located in a region of abundant coral reefs known as the Coral Triangle as well as being the country with the most volcanoes in the world. Some beaches are derived from fluvial sands and gravels, others from cliff erosion. Coral reefs form white or yellow sanded beaches, while beach sediments derived from volcanic rocks are typically black or grey, such as those of northern Bali and southern Java. In the granitic zone of the Riau, Bangka and Belitung Islands, white quartz sands as well as granite boulders dominate. Sandy backshores are colonized by coastal vegetation, notably Ipomoea pes-caprae and Spinifex littoreus, then coconut and casuarina trees. Coastal dunes are poorly developed in the humid tropics, but on the southern shores of Java and Sumatra, prograded beaches are backed by dunes, some of which carry woodland vegetation. Large deposits of lava and ash from volcanic eruptions may transport large quantities of pyroclastic sediment down to the coast, such as at Mount Merapi in southern Java and Mount Agung in Bali. The area within the Coral Triangle is associated with rich marine biodiversity. Beaches in the area, such as those that are important turtle nesting beaches, are protected by the government.

Wave action in Indonesian waters is largely generated by local winds, gentle in the equatorial zone but stronger on the northern and southern coasts subject to northeast and southeast trade winds, respectively. Ocean swell moves into the southern coast from the Indian Ocean and to the northern coast from the southwest Pacific, are creating particularly large waves in this area.

Some beaches are considered sacred and ritual processions are held on these. Sea temples are erected on the coasts of Bali, Lombok, and Java to appease the god or goddess of the Sea. Some beaches on the southern coast of Java are considered sacred because of their association with the figure of Nyai Roro Kidul, Queen of the Southern Sea. In accordance with Javanese beliefs, people are warned not to wear green clothes on these beaches because the color is sacred to her and wearing it may offend her and cause the person to drown into the sea. Rituals are enacted on beaches such as Parangtritis, Pangandaran, Karang Bolong Beach, Ngliyep, Puger, and Banyuwangi.

Below is a list of notable Indonesian beaches. The list is sorted by provinces roughly west to east, north to south; and then alphabetically by the name of the beach, ignoring the words "beach" or "pantai" (Indonesian "beach"). To avoid mistranslation, the names of the beaches are listed by translating the word pantai into "beach". Translation of other words, such as Tanjung (Indonesian for "cape") or Pasir Putih (Indonesian for "white sand"), are ignored.

== Aceh ==
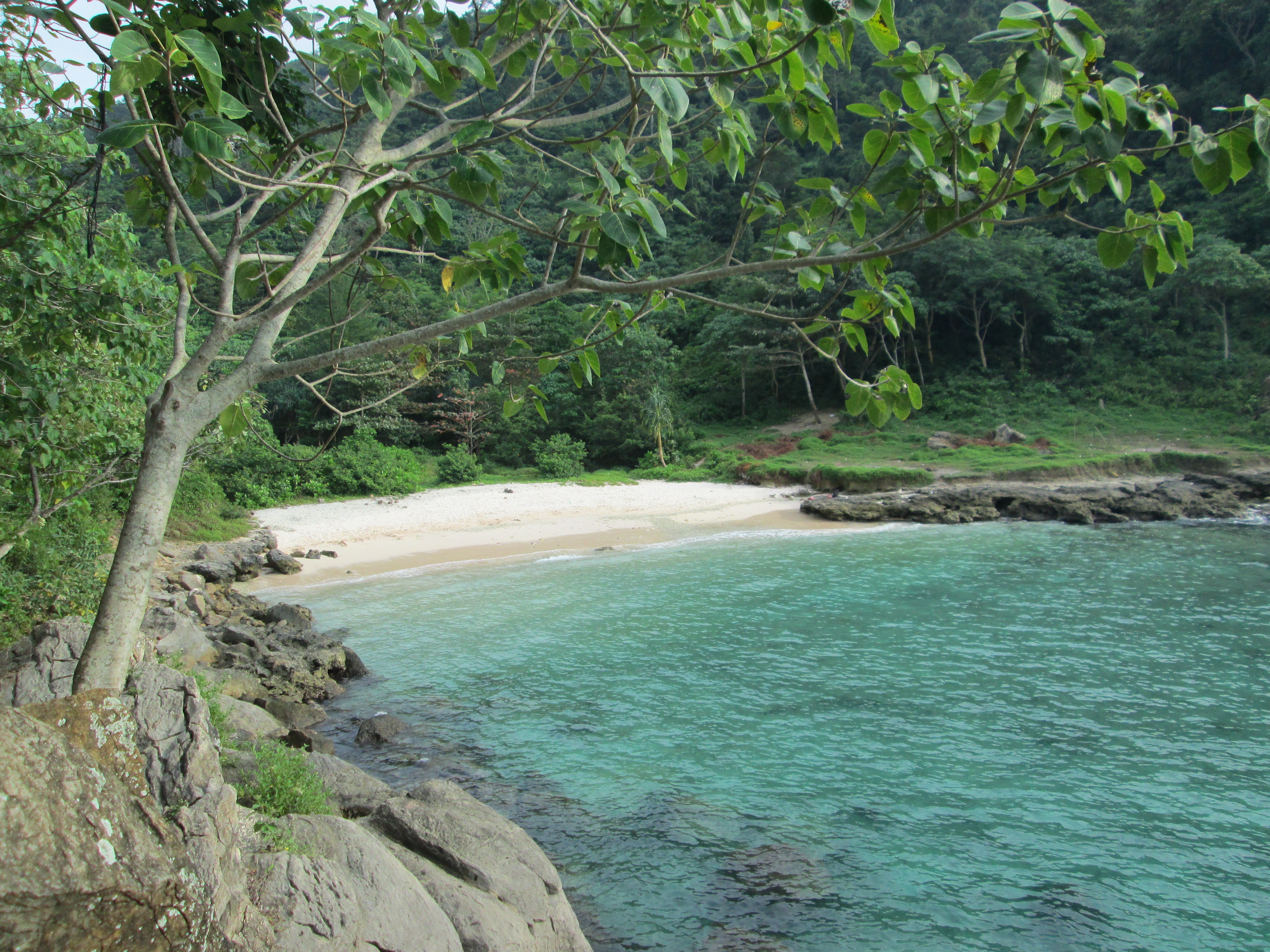
Lhôk Mata Ië Beach

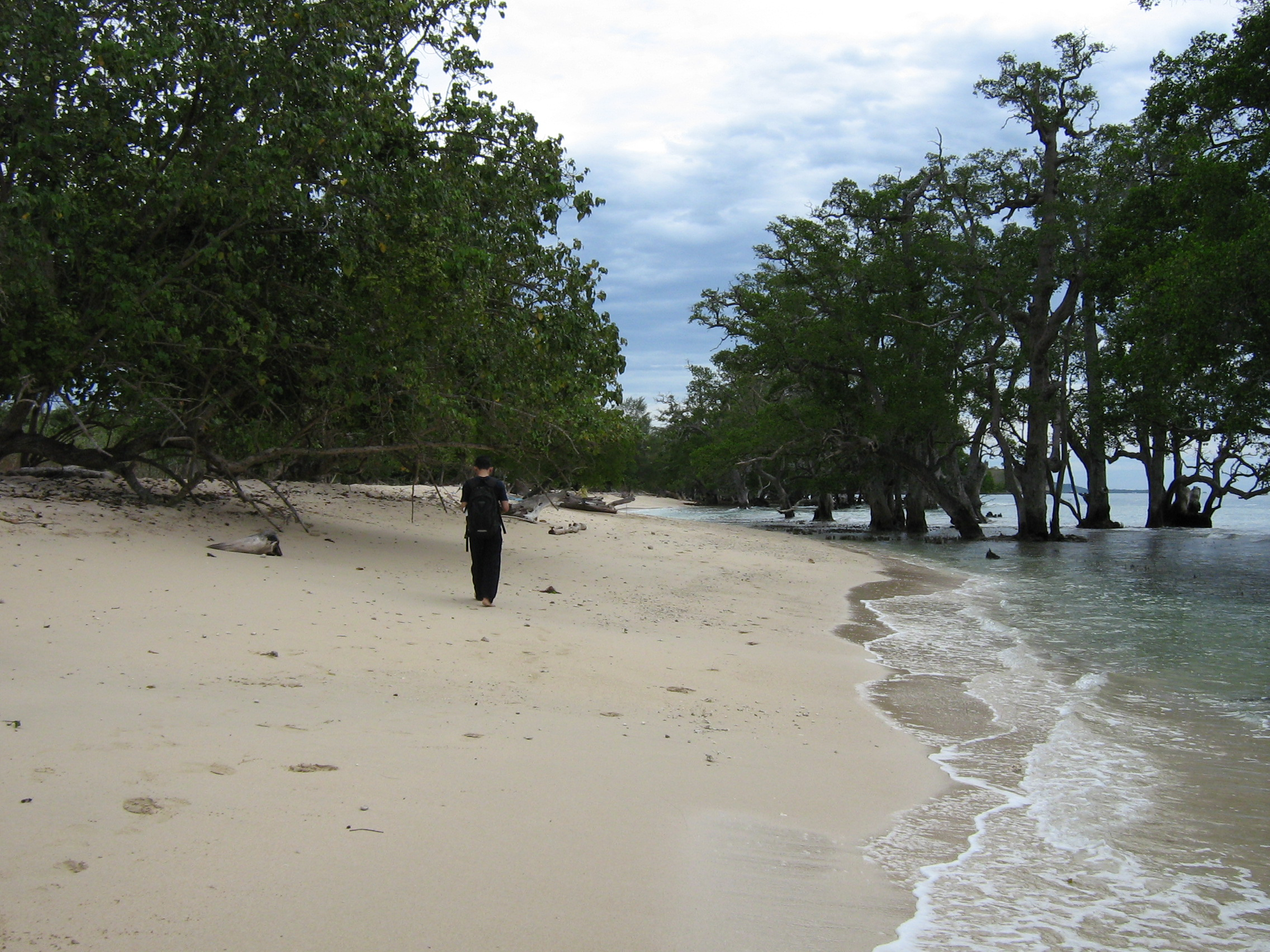
Lhôk Mè Beach

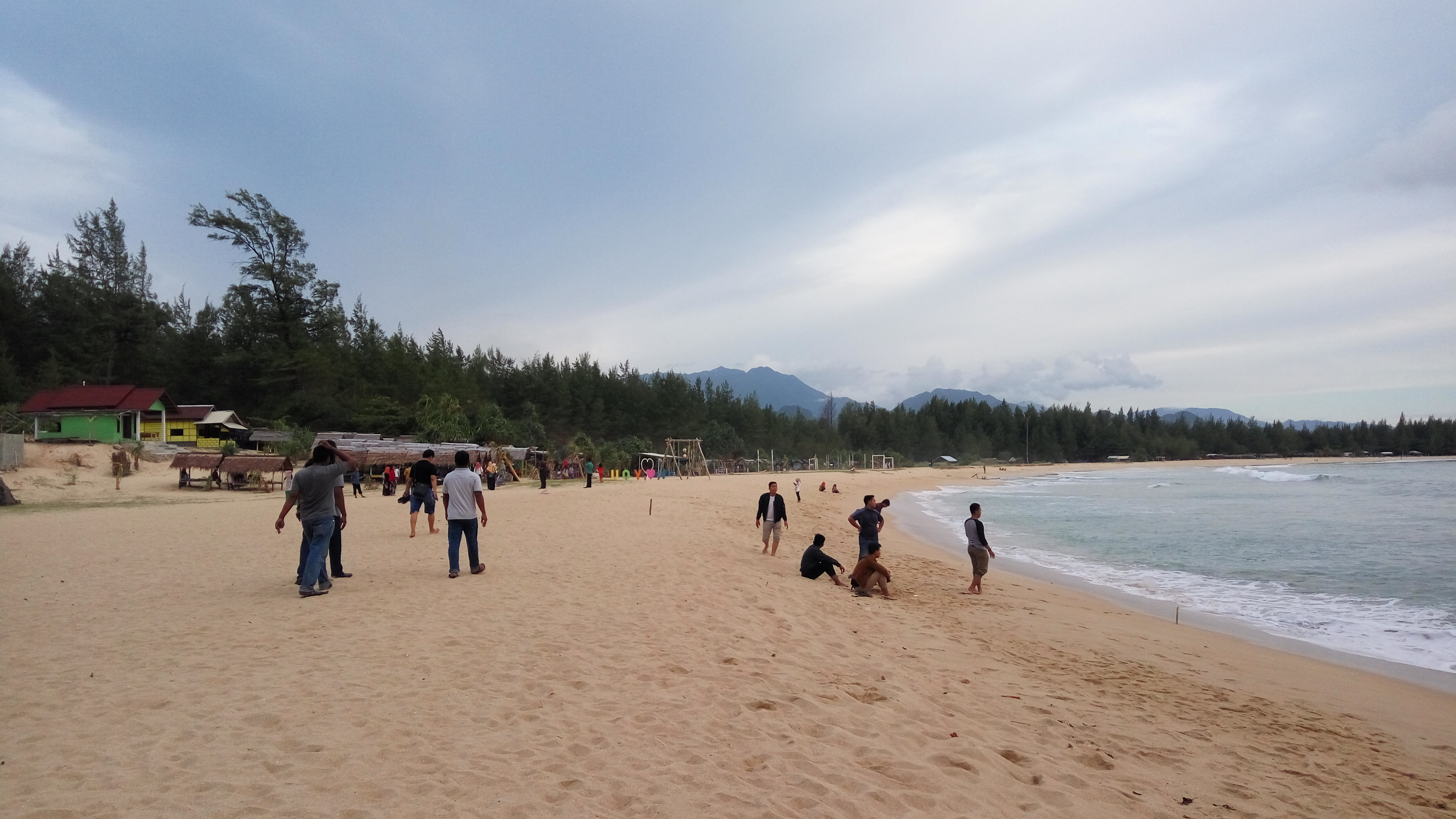
Lampu'uk Beach

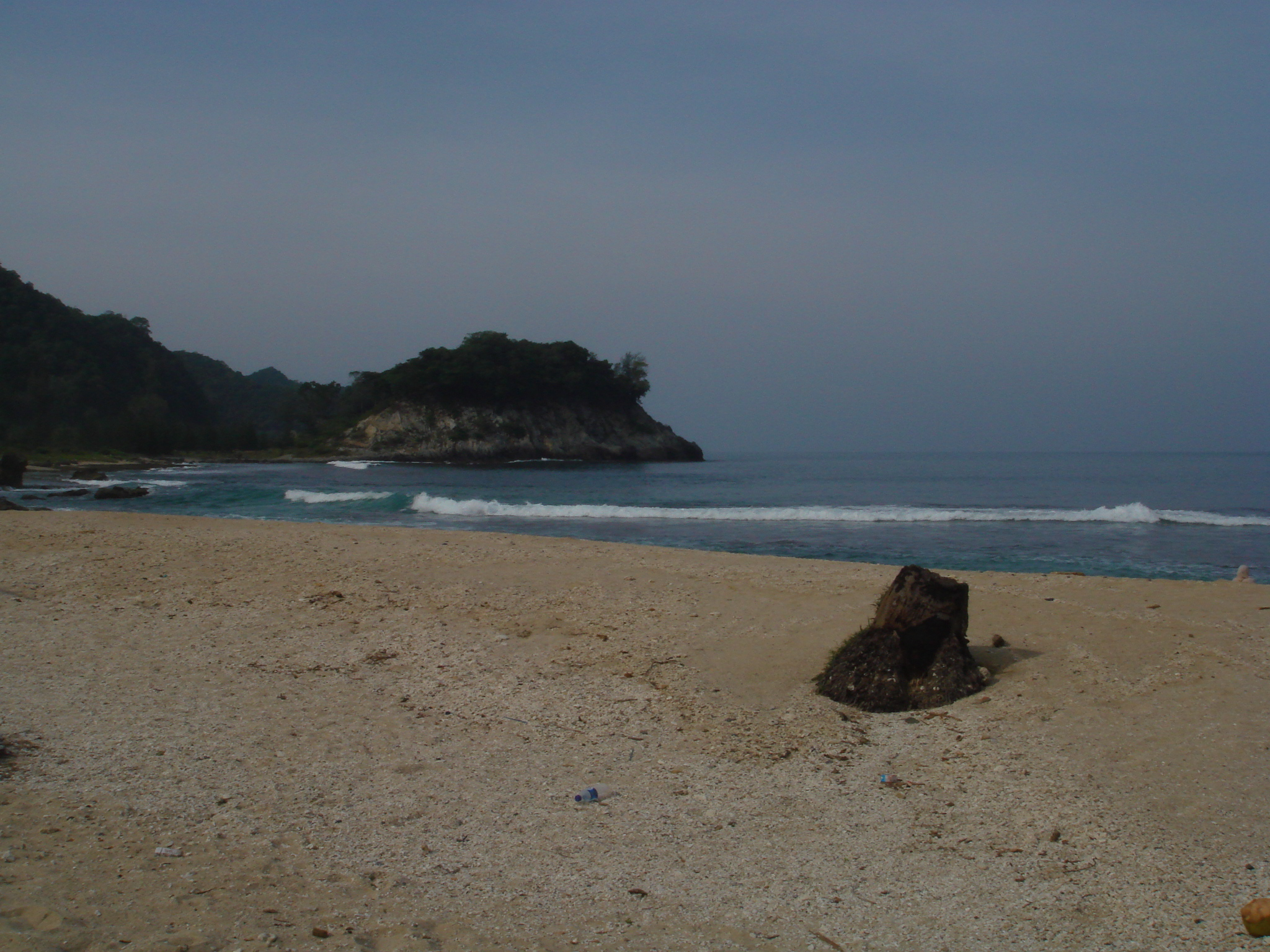
Lhok Nga Beach

The most notable beaches for tourism in Aceh are located to the northern tip of the province, near the archipelago of Sabang, the capital city of Banda Aceh and the northern regency of Aceh Besar. Normally formed in a bay area, many beaches contains the word Lhok, Acehnese for "bay". Owing to their strategic location during World War II, some of the northern beaches contain bunkers and concrete pillboxes constructed by the Japanese troops.

The western coastal areas of Aceh were among the areas hardest hit by the 2004 tsunami. Many of the pristine beaches and coral reefs were devastated. The area was slowly rebuilt after the disaster and tourism is slowly returning to normal.

=== Weh Island ===
Weh Island is a volcanic island known for its underwater fumaroles which can be accessed by diving. There are many beaches in this island:

- Gapang Beach. The beach contains the highest variation of accommodation in the Weh Island. The sea of Gapang Beach contains underwater fumaroles called Hydrothermal Point and is suitable for diving
- Iboih Beach. A few meters from Iboih is the Rubiah islet that is known for its coral reefs and the beach is popular for diving.
- Kasih Beach
- Paradiso Beach
- Sumur Tiga Beach

=== Aceh Besar Regency ===
There are many beautiful beaches in Aceh Besar Regency:

- Lampu'uk Beach, Lhoknga subdistrict. The beach was devastated by the 2004 Tsunami. The beach has been restored and tourists are returning to the beach.
- Lhoknga Beach, Lhoknga subdistrict. The beach and the neighboring town of Lhoknga was completely wiped out by the 2004 tsunami. The beach has been restored and tourists are returning to the beach.
- Lhok Me Beach in Mesjid Raya subdistrict.
- Hidden beaches of Ujông Pancu:
  - Lhôk Mata Ië Beach
  - Lhôk Keutapang Cut Beach
  - Lhôk Keutapang Rayek Beach
  - Ië Rah Beach
  - Langè Beach
- Ujong Batee Beach. The beach is known for the concrete pillboxes constructed by the Japanese during the World War II.

=== Lhokseumawe ===
Located in the northern side of Sumatra, the insular city of Lhokseumawe (part of the North Aceh Regency until its separation in 2001 to form an independent city) contains beaches that is known for its calm water.

- Meuraksa Beach
- Rancong Beach
- Ujong Blang Beach

== North Sumatra ==
Notable beaches of North Sumatra province are on the island of Nias and are surfing destinations. Despite the long history of surfing in Nias, international surfing in has slowed down in part due to the 2004 tsunami and following earthquakes. The situation is slowly changing, however.

- Cermin Beach, Serdang Bedagai
- Beaches of Nias Island.
  - Lagundri Beach and Sorake Beach, Teluk Dalam, South Nias. The two beaches enclose the Sorake Bay, an international surfing spot.

== Riau Islands ==
Riau Islands Province being insular in character, contains many beaches. The most notable of these are located in Bintan Island, the largest island in the province. Bintan Resorts contains beach-front International hotels and resorts. Many of the resorts are Singaporean owned and the island is marketed to Singaporeans for whom Bintan is a short ferry trip away. Currently, Indonesian government is promoting Bintan as the next best tourist destination after Bali.

- Palawan Beach, Great Karimun
- Pongkar Beach, Great Karimun

== West Sumatra ==
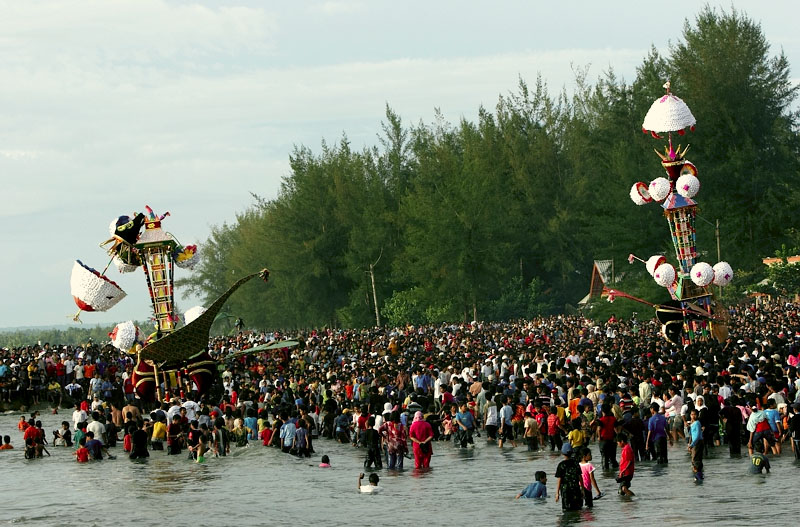
The ritual of Tabuik in Gandoriah Beach.

The beaches of West Sumatra are located on the western coast of the province.

- Air Manis Beach, Padang
- Arta Pariaman Beach
- Bungus Beach, Bungus Bay, Padang
- Carocok Beach, Painan
- Caroline Beach
- Gandoriah Beach, Pariaman. Tabuik, The local interpretation of the Islamic festival of Muharram is held on the beach.
- Padang Beach, Padang
- Pasir Bajak Beach, Padang

== Bangka-Belitung Islands ==
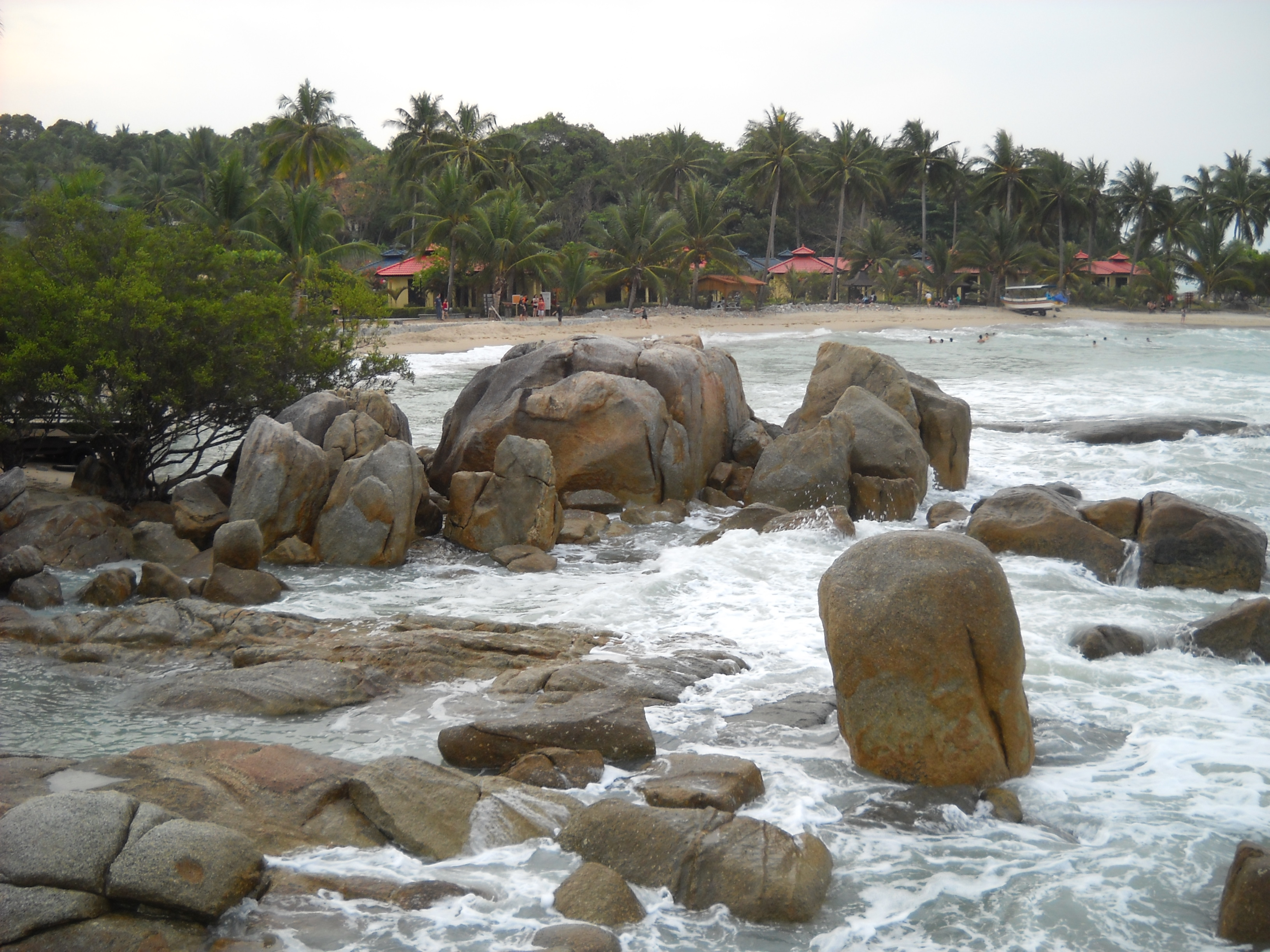
Parai Tenggiri Beach of Bangka Island.

Bangka-Belitung Islands are known for their white sanded beaches with clear blue water and granite boulders. Granite boulders and white sand quartz that dominate the beaches are associated with the late Paleozoic-early Triassic Era's Granite Belt formation on the western side of Indonesia.

- Beaches of Bangka Island:
  - Air Anyir Beach
  - Batu Bedaun Beach
  - Matras Beach
  - Parai Tenggiri Beach
  - Pasir Padi Beach
  - Penyusuk Beach
  - Rambak Beach
  - Romodong Beach
  - Tanjung Kalian Beach
  - Tanjung Pesona Beach
  - Tanjung Ular Beach
  - Teluk Uber Beach
  - Temberan Beach
  - Tikus Beach
- Beaches of Belitung:
  - Beaches of Lengkuas Island
  - Punai Beach
  - Tanjung Binga Beach
  - Tanjung Kelayang Beach
  - Tanjung Tinggi Beach

== Bengkulu ==
The beaches of Bengkulu are located on the Indian Ocean western coast of the province.

- Panjang Beach, Bengkulu
- Pasir Putih Beach, Baii Island

== South Sumatra ==
The northern coastline of South Sumatra is mostly covered in mangrove forests with rare well-formed beaches. The water carry large sandy deposits, forming a deltaic plains in the river mouth. Most cities or towns are located to the south of the province.

== Lampung ==
The beaches of Lampung are located to the east, west, and south of the province. The beaches of the southeast coast in the Sunda Strait were affected by the historical volcano blast of Krakatau in 1883.

- Bagus Beach, South Lampung
- Merak Belantung Beach, South Lampung
- Mutun Beach, Lempasing
- Sapenan Beach, South Lampung
- Terbaya Beach, Kota Agung. Hindu people performs the Melasti ritual on Terbaya beach.

== Banten ==
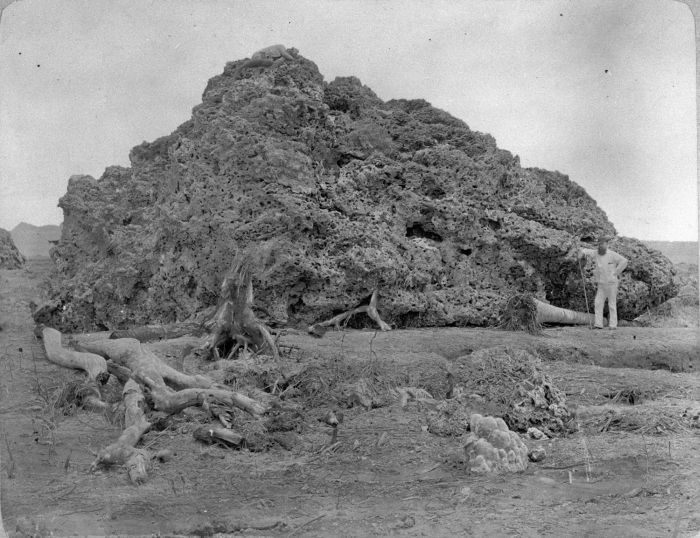
Large block of coral washed by the tsunami to the beach of Anyer after the Krakatau explosion in 1883.

Notable beaches of Banten are located on the western coast of the province. The coast between Anyer and Labuan is mainly formed by an emerged fringing coral reef. Coral boulders are widespread along the shore, swept in from fringing coral reefs by the 1883 tsunami and deposited on the shore platform and the coastal plain. Monuments are erected on several beach to commemorate the victim of the tsunami.

- Anyer Beach, Anyer
- Carita Beach, Pandeglang
- Karang Bolong Beach, Karangbolong, Pandeglang.
- Sawarna Beach, Sawarna, Lebak
- Tanjung Lesung Beach, Pandeglang
- Ciputih Beach
- Peucang Beach

== West Java ==
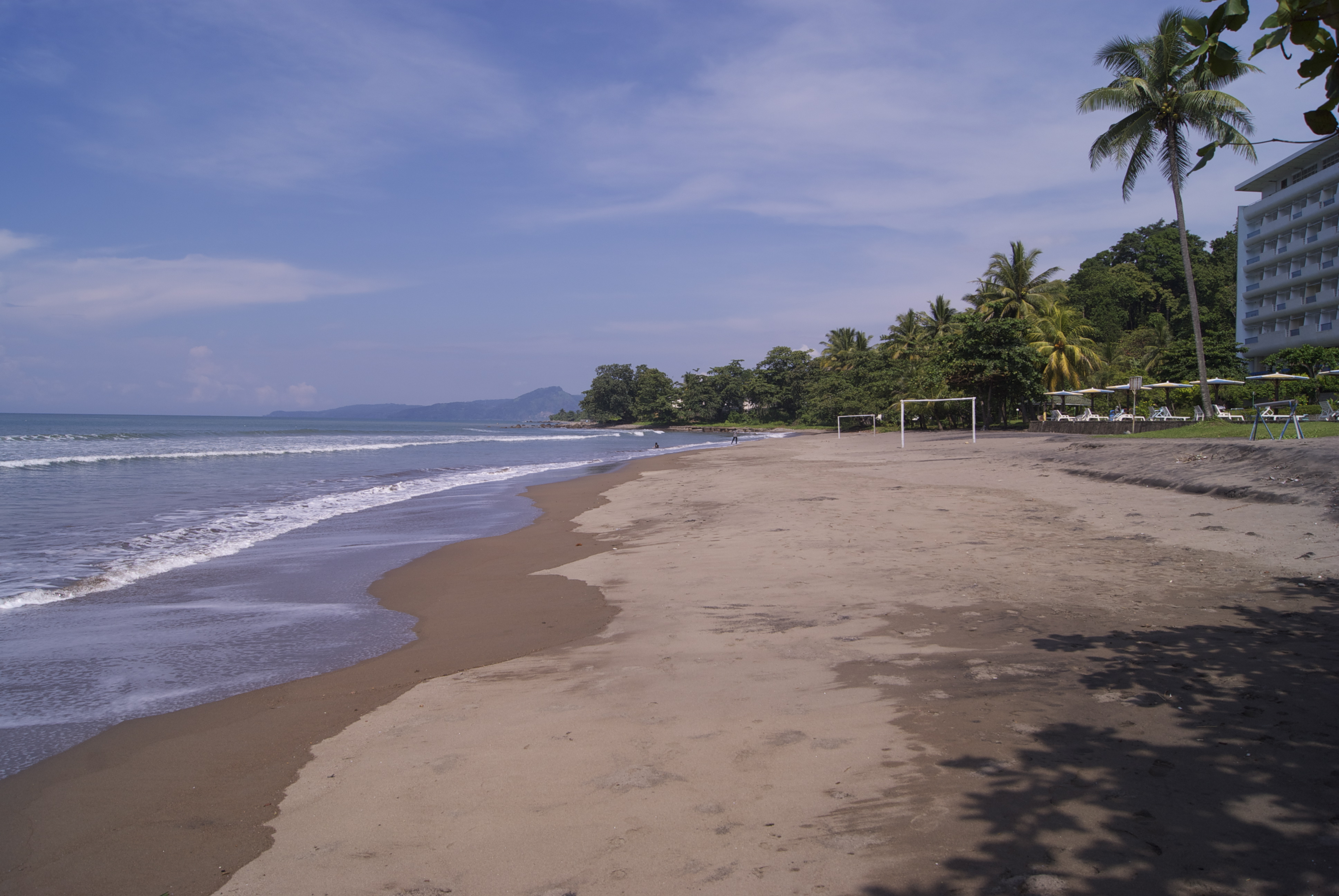
Samudra Beach Hotel and the Cimaja Beach. Samudra Beach Hotel is a historic hotel with one of its room reserved for Nyai Roro Kidul, queen of the southern sea.

The province of West Java contains beaches on both its northern coast and southern coast. The beaches of the northern coast are known for its calm water due to the low wave-energy of the Java Sea. The more notable beaches on the southern coast are known for the big waves and famous for surfing. Some beaches on the southern coast are considered sacred due to their association with Nyai Roro Kidul. The Javanese beliefs warn people not to wear green clothes on these beaches because the color is sacred and wearing one may offend her and cause the person to drown into the sea.

The Samudra Beach Hotel, one of the first resort of Indonesia in Pelabuhan Ratu Beach, keeps one of its room, room 308, furnished with green colors as part of the sacred reservation for Nyai Roro Kidul, a sacred figure believed to be the ruler of the Southern Sea.

- Batu Hiu Beach. Batu Hiu translates as "shark rock", it is called so because of a nearby rock formation shaped like a shark's fin.
- Batukaras Beach, Batukaras
- Cijayana Beach, Garut
- Cimaja Beach, Pelabuhan Ratu Subdistrict, Sukabumi.
- Karang Hawu Beach, Sukabumi Regency. The beach is one of the sacred beach of Nyai Roro Kidul; the place where Nyai Roro Kidul leapt into the ocean to regain her lost beauty and never returned. A shrine was built on top of the cliff.
- Karang Paranje Beach, Garut
- Pangandaran Beach, Pangandaran. The beach is one of the sacred beach of Nyai Roro Kidul.
- Pelabuhan Ratu Beach, Pelabuhan Ratu, Sukabumi. The beach is one of the sacred beach of Nyai Roro Kidul.
- Rancabuaya Beach, Garut
- Santolo Beach, Garut
- Ujung Genteng Beach, Sukabumi Regency

== Jakarta Special Capital Region ==
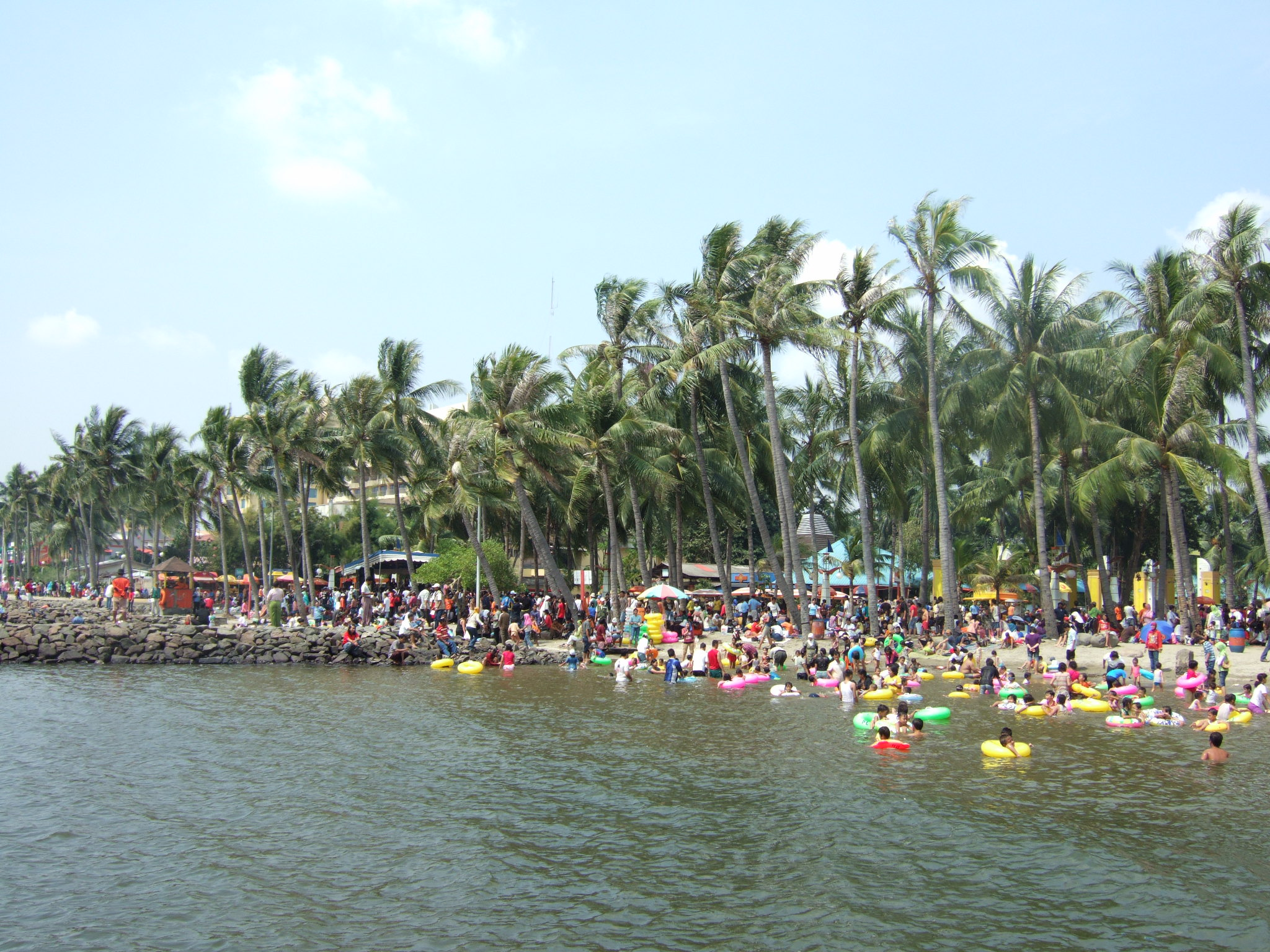
Festival Beach in North Jakarta.

Jakarta, the capital of Indonesia, has a beach on its northern coast in Jakarta Bay. The water of Jakarta Bay is relatively polluted, the result of the poor living condition of the majority of people living along the bay, as well as nutrient inputs from agricultural runoff, industrial pollution, and waste water.

The more pristine beaches of Jakarta are located in Thousand Islands, the only regency of Jakarta Special Capital Region. Being located further away from Java island, the islands' beach are less affected by pollution coming from the Jakarta Bay. Being a coral island, the beaches of Thousand Islands are white-sanded.

- Festival Beach, Ancol, North Jakarta
- Beaches of the Thousand Islands

== Central Java ==
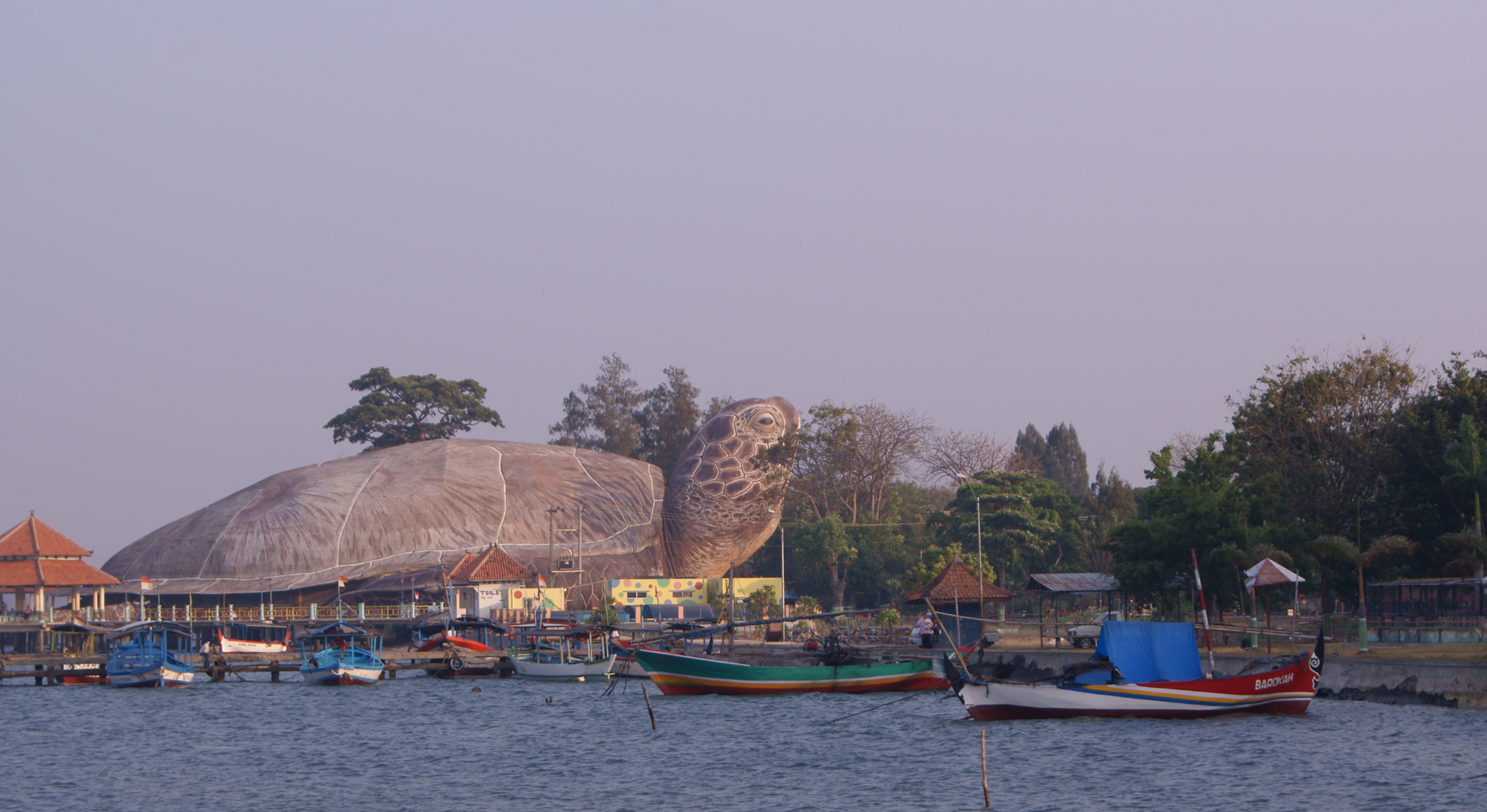
A giant marine turtle sculpture in Kartini Beach, Jepara.

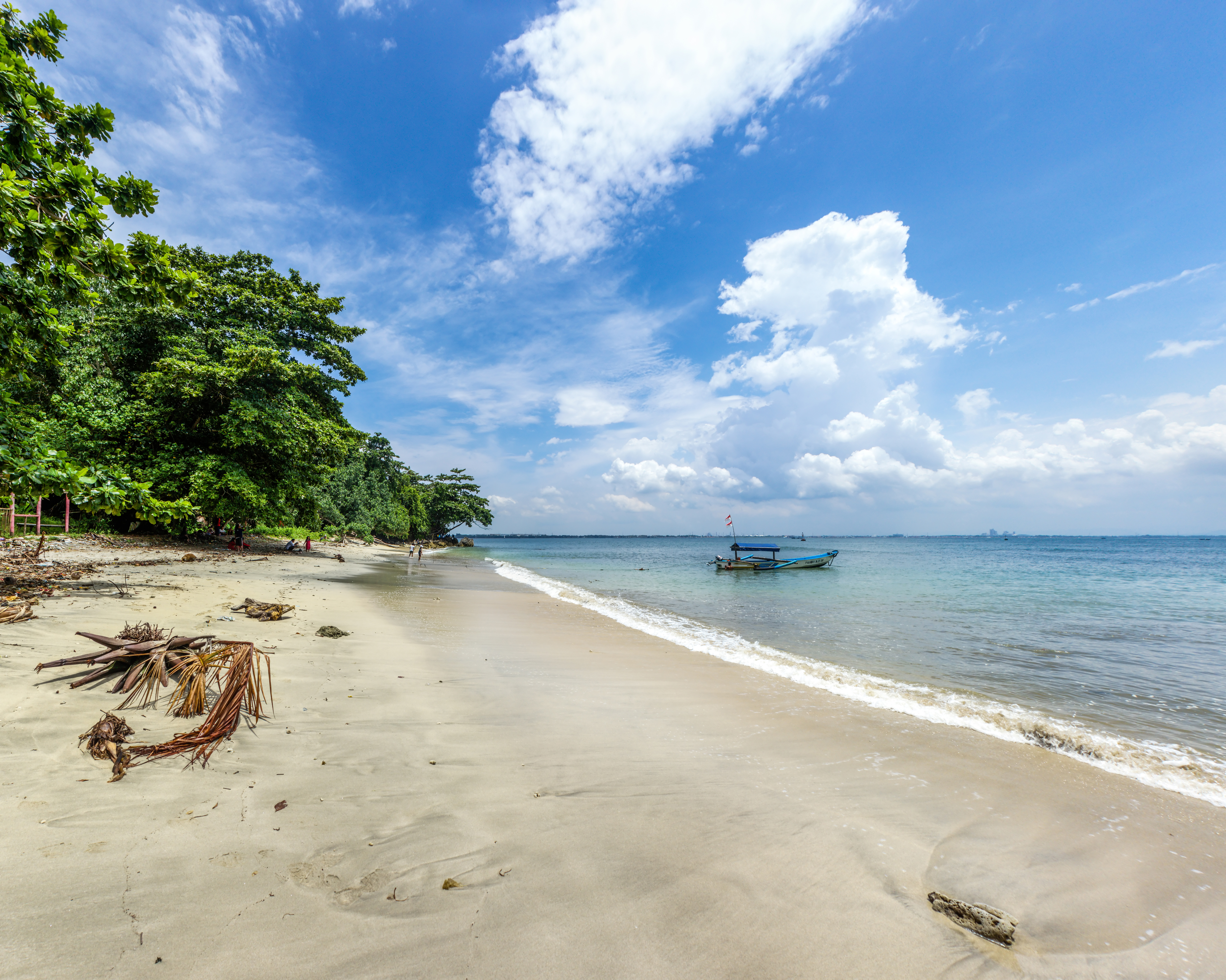
Karang Bolong Beach, Cilacap

The beaches of Central Java are located both on the northern and southern coast. Many of the notable beaches are located to the northern coast, known for the relatively calm water of the Java Sea

- Alam Indah Beach, Tegal
- Tirto Samodra Beach (Bandengan Beach), Jepara
- Kartini Beach, Jepara
- Blebak Beach, Jepara
- Ombak Mati Beach, Jepara
- Pecatu Beach (Gua Manik Beach), Jepara
- Pailus Beach, Jepara
- Suweru Beach, Jepara
- Empurancak Beach, Jepara
- Beaches of Karimun Jawa.
  - Barakuda Beach
  - Legon Lele Beach
  - Tanjung Gelam Beach
- Karang Bolong Beach, Cilacap
- Jatimalang Beach, Purworejo
- Marina Beach, Semarang
- Beaches of Nusa Kambangan
- Purwahamba Beach, Tegal
- Sembukan Beach, Wonogiri Regency. According to the local myth, the beach is the thirteenth gate of the Kingdom of Ratu Kidul and a meeting point of the queen of the Kingdom, Nyai Roro Kidul, and the kings of Surakarta Sunanate. An offering ritual is held on Sembukan beach annually.
- Teluk Penyu Beach, Cilacap
- Widuri Beach, Pemalang
- Menganti Beach, Kebumen
- Petanahan Beach, Kebumen
- Lembupurwo Beach, Kebumen
- Suwuk Beach, Kebumen
- Logending Beach, Kebumen

== Yogyakarta (special region) ==
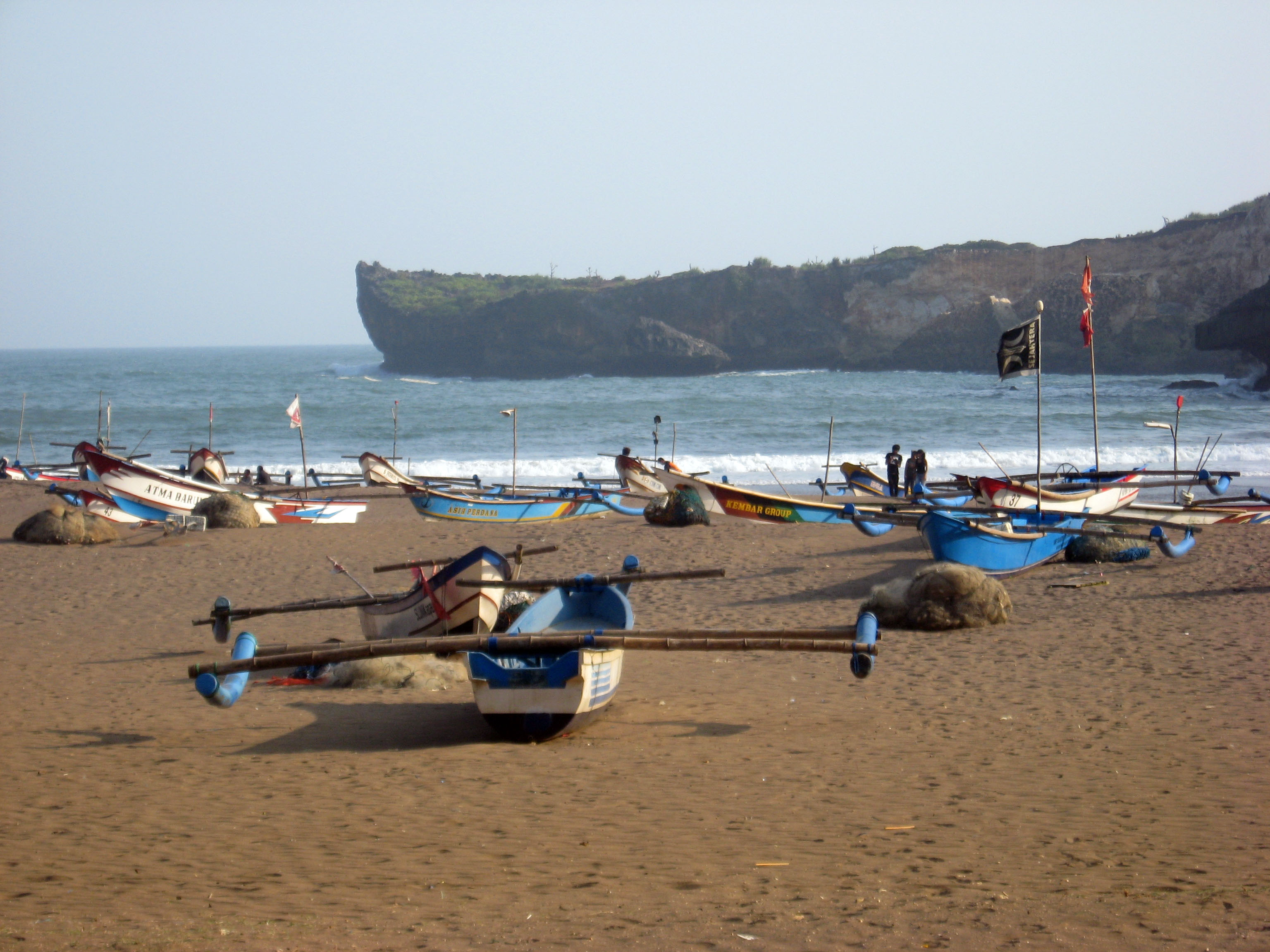
Baron Beach with a limestone cliff in the background.

Beaches in Yogyakarta are located on the southern coast. In Gunung Kidul Regency, the beaches are known for its karst formation, forming hills and limestone caves near the beach.

Other notable beaches are the ones around Parangtritis: Parangtritis Beach and Parangkusumo Beach. The sacred Parangkusumo beach is considered as the place where Panembahan Senopati sought the support of the goddess of the Southern Ocean, Nyai Roro Kidul, Queen of the Southern Sea. A procession of the labuhan alit (giving an offering by throwing out certain things to the sea) is done annually on the beach. These beaches are also known for the coastal sand dune formations.

- Baron Beach, Gunung Kidul
- Congot Beach, Kulon Progo
- Depok Beach, Bantul
- Drini Beach, Gunung Kidul
- Glagah Beach, Kulon Progo
- Indrayanti Beach, Gunung Kidul
- Krakal Beach, Gunung Kidul
- Kukup Beach, Gunung Kidul
- Ngobaran Beach, Gunung Kidul
- Ngrenean Beach, Gunung Kidul
- Parangkusumo Beach, Bantul
- Parangtritis Beach, Bantul
- Pok Tunggal Beach, Gunung Kidul
- Sadeng Beach, Gunung Kidul
- Sepanjang Beach, Gunung Kidul
- Siung Beach, Gunung Kidul
- Sundak Beach, Gunung Kidul
- Trisik Beach, Kulon Progo
- Wediombo Beach, Gunung Kidul

== East Java ==
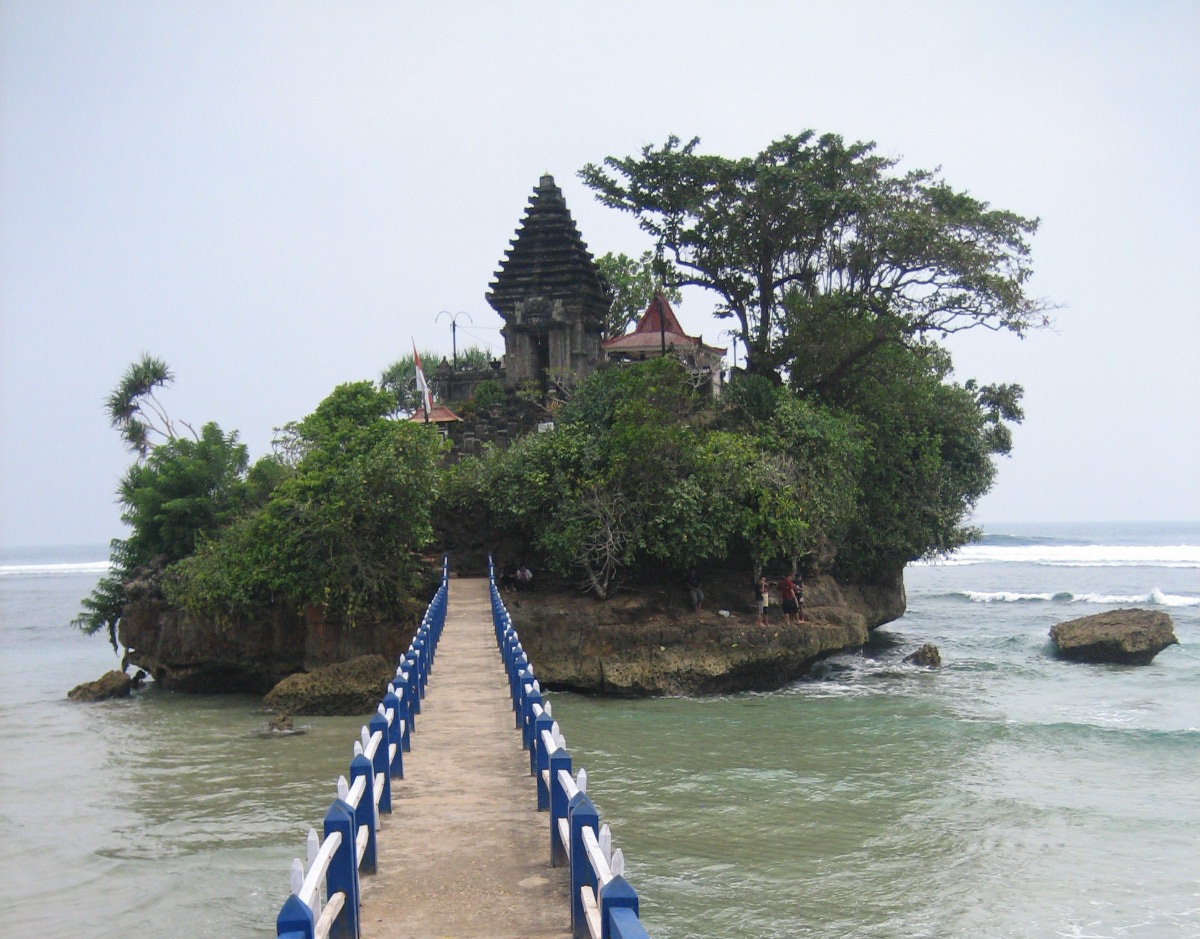
A temple at Balekambang Beach.

Both the north and south coasts of East Java contain beaches. As with the other provinces of Java, the southern beaches are known for their large waves while the northern beaches are known for their calm waters. Several beaches on the southern coast are considered sacred due to their association with Nyai Roro Kidul.

- Balekambang Beach, Malang
- G-Land or Plengkung Beach, Alas Purwo National Park
- Goa China Beach, Bantengan Village, Malang. The beach is known for its large rocky outcrops and white sand beach.
- Klayar Beach, Pacitan
- Ngliyep Beach, Malang. The beach is one of the sacred beach of Nyai Roro Kidul.
- Puger Beach, Jember. The beach is one of the sacred beaches of Nyai Roro Kidul. Puger Beach is known as a surfing spot and the beach also contains extensive sand dunes which reach the height up to 20 meters.
- Sendang Biru Beach, Malang
- Sukamade Beach, Meru Betiri National Park. A turtle conservation area was established on the beach in 1972, older than the National Park itself.
- Tamban Beach, Malang, www.tambanindah.tk
- Watu Karung Beach, Pacitan
- Wedi Ireng Beach, Pancer, Banyuwangi.

== Bali ==
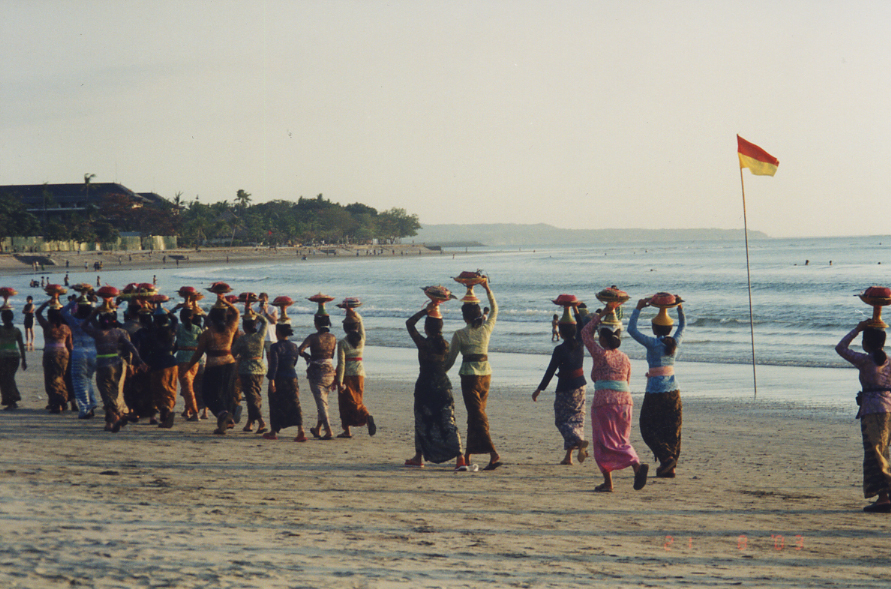
A Balinese funeral procession on a beach.

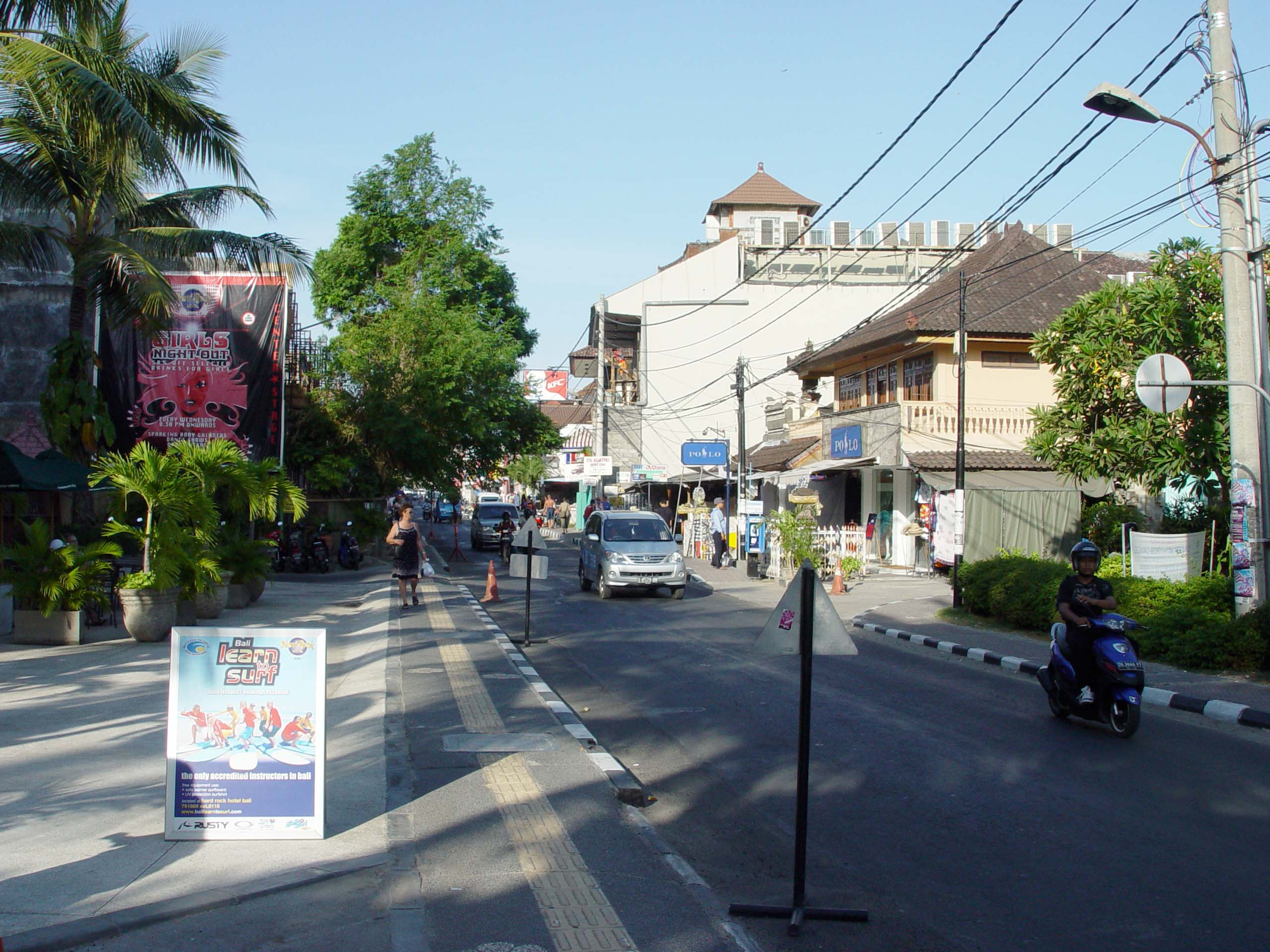
Kuta main street along the beach of Kuta.

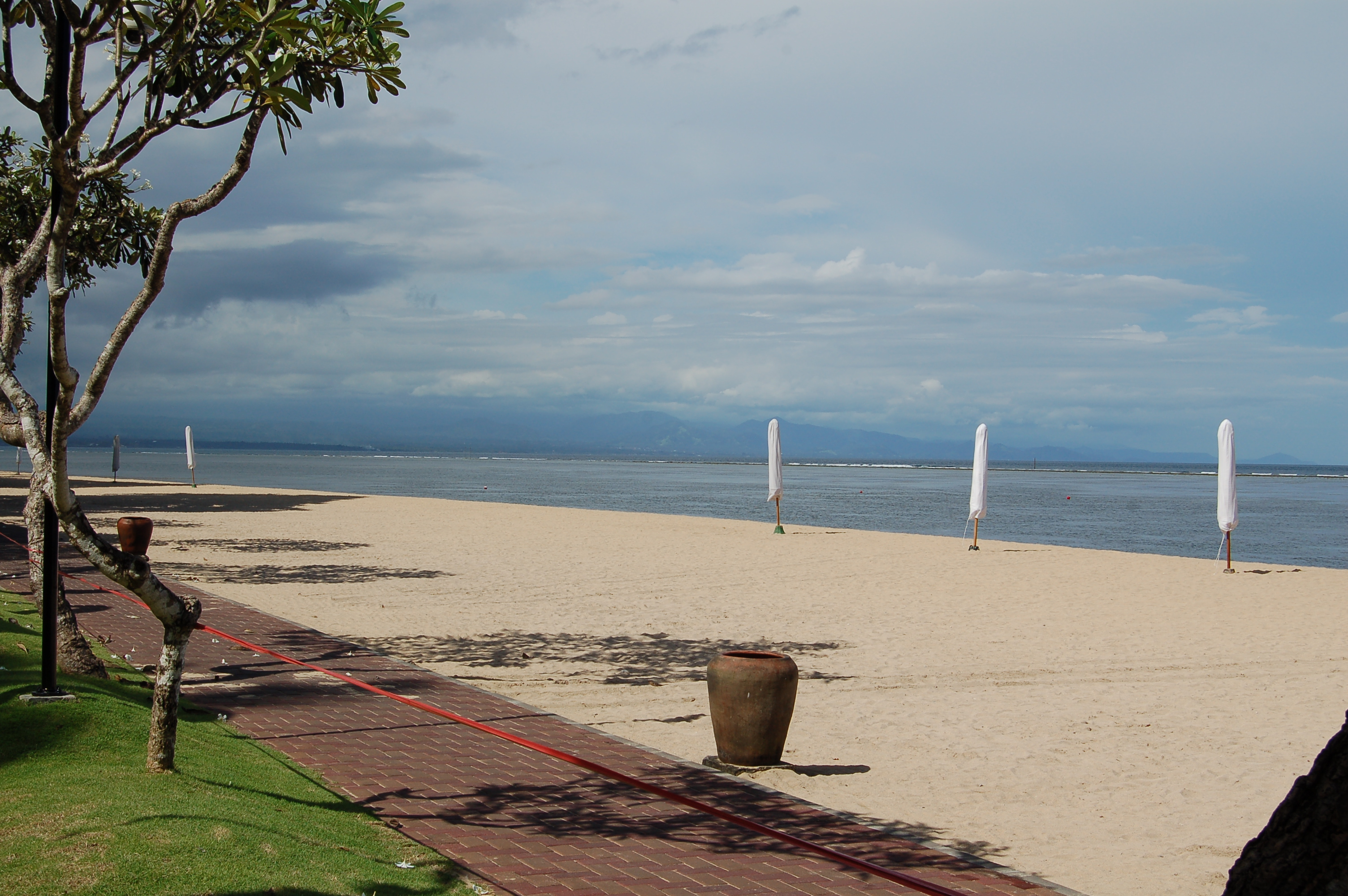
Sanur Beach, southeastern coast of Bali.

Bali is surrounded with beaches and coral reefs. Most of the beaches are variation of tan or grey sanded beaches, while the white sand beaches are not that common. Surf conditions range from limp to torrid, depending on whether there is an offshore reef.

The beach of Bali plays an important part in the Balinese Hindu ritual. Before the day of Nyepi, Hindu worshipers have to perform the Melasti Ritual, which should be enacted in a Balinese temple that is located near the sea (Pura Segara or "Sea Temple"). This is done to purify the sacred objects belonging to several temples, as well as to acquire the sacred waters from the sea.

- Amed Beach, Karangasem. Amed Beach is a black sand beach lined with traditional outrigger fishing boats. The beach is known for it marine sea life and is a snorkeling spot.
- Beaches of Nusa Lembongan
  - Mushroom Bay Beach
- Beaches of Nusa Dua. Nusa Dua is home to some of the most exclusive resorts in Bali.
  - Geger Beach. The beach contains a seaweed farming area.
- Beaches of Nusa Penida
- Beaches of Pecatu. The resort area contains beaches surrounded with cliffs. The beaches are popular surfing spot.
  - Bingin Beach
  - Balangan Beach
  - Crystal Bay Beach. The water is best known for the sightings of Mola mola
  - Impossible Beach
  - Padang Padang Beach
  - Pandawa Beach
  - Suluban Beach
- Candidasa Beach, Karangasem
- Canggu Beach, Canggu
- Dreamland Beach.
- Kuta Beach, Kuta, Bali. Kuta beach is the most popular beach. Originally a surfing destination Kuta Beach is nowadays Bali's party beach and is packed with hotels, restaurants, bars and night clubs. The district is known as the location of the 2002 Bali bombings.
- Jimbaran Beach, Jimbaran. The beach is populated by many luxurious resorts.
- Legian Beach
- Lovina Beach, Lovina. Lovina contains black sand beaches, and is also known for dolphin spotting.
- Padang Bai Beach.
- Sanur Beach, Sanur. The historic beach is known for its old time flavor and local feeling.
- Seminyak Beach

== West Nusa Tenggara ==
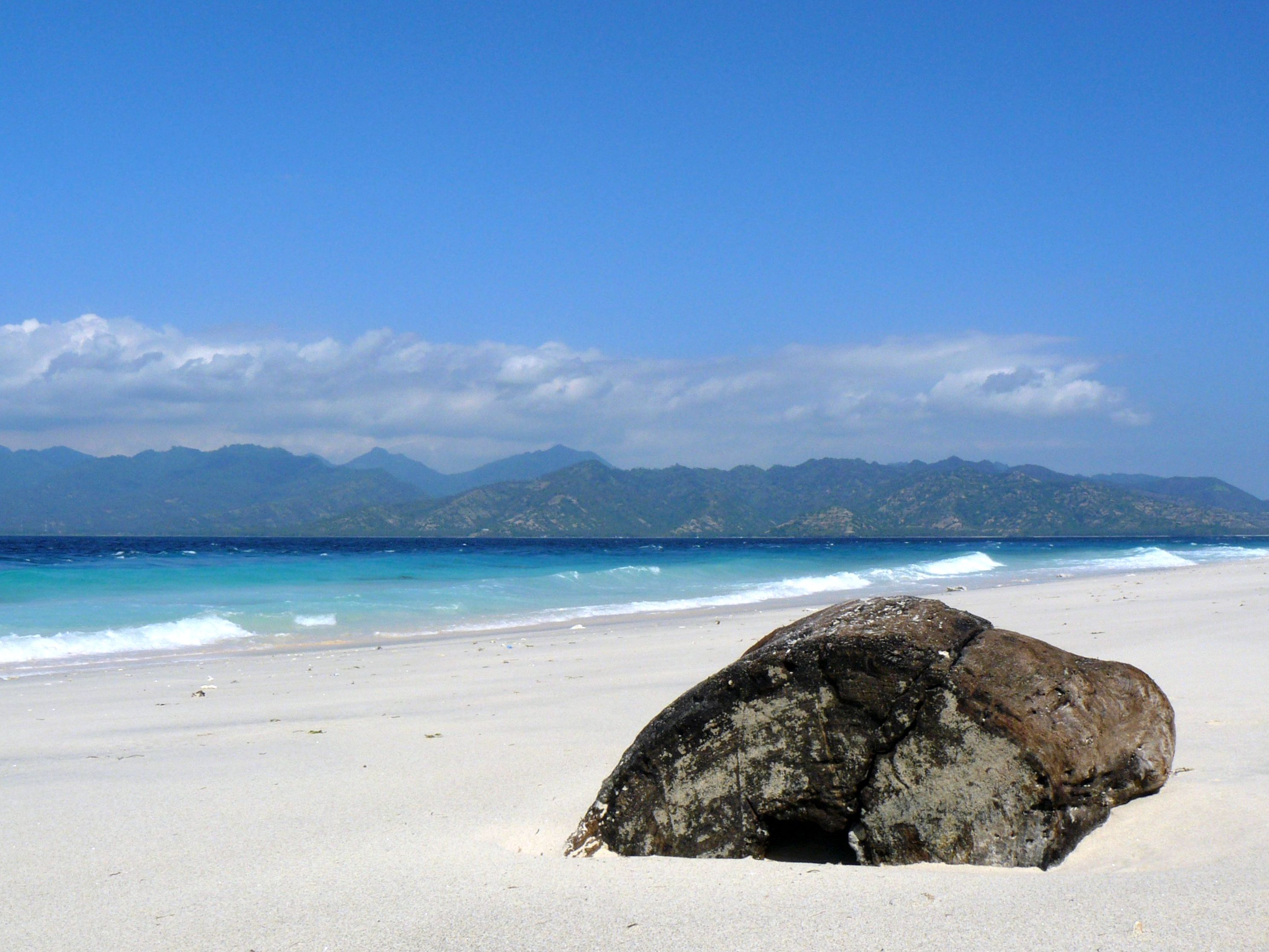
Gili Meno Beach, Gili Islands, probably the most popular beach in Lombok

The beaches of the islands in the West Nusa Tenggara is less promoted than the neighboring island of Bali. Being surrounded by coral reefs, the white sand beach of the islands are the most notable.

The second largest island of West Nusa Tenggara, Lombok, as well as the closest island to Bali, is gaining more popularity for the western tourists who are looking for a remote island experience.

The largest island of West Nusa Tenggara, the island of Sumbawa, is less promoted and less developed than Lombok, although some of the beaches have become a popular spot for surf culture.

- Beaches of Gili Islands.
- Beaches of Lombok
  - Kuta Beach, named after a nearby village of Kuta. The beach is known for the traditional ritual of Bau Nyale, which is a marine worm hunting ritual, a prelude for the larger Pasola festival.
  - Mawun Beach
  - Senggigi Beach, one of the most popular beach of Lombok
- Beaches of Sumbawa:
  - Hu'u Beach
  - Lakey Beach
  - Lawar Beach
  - Sekongkang Beach
  - Supersuck Beach

== East Nusa Tenggara ==
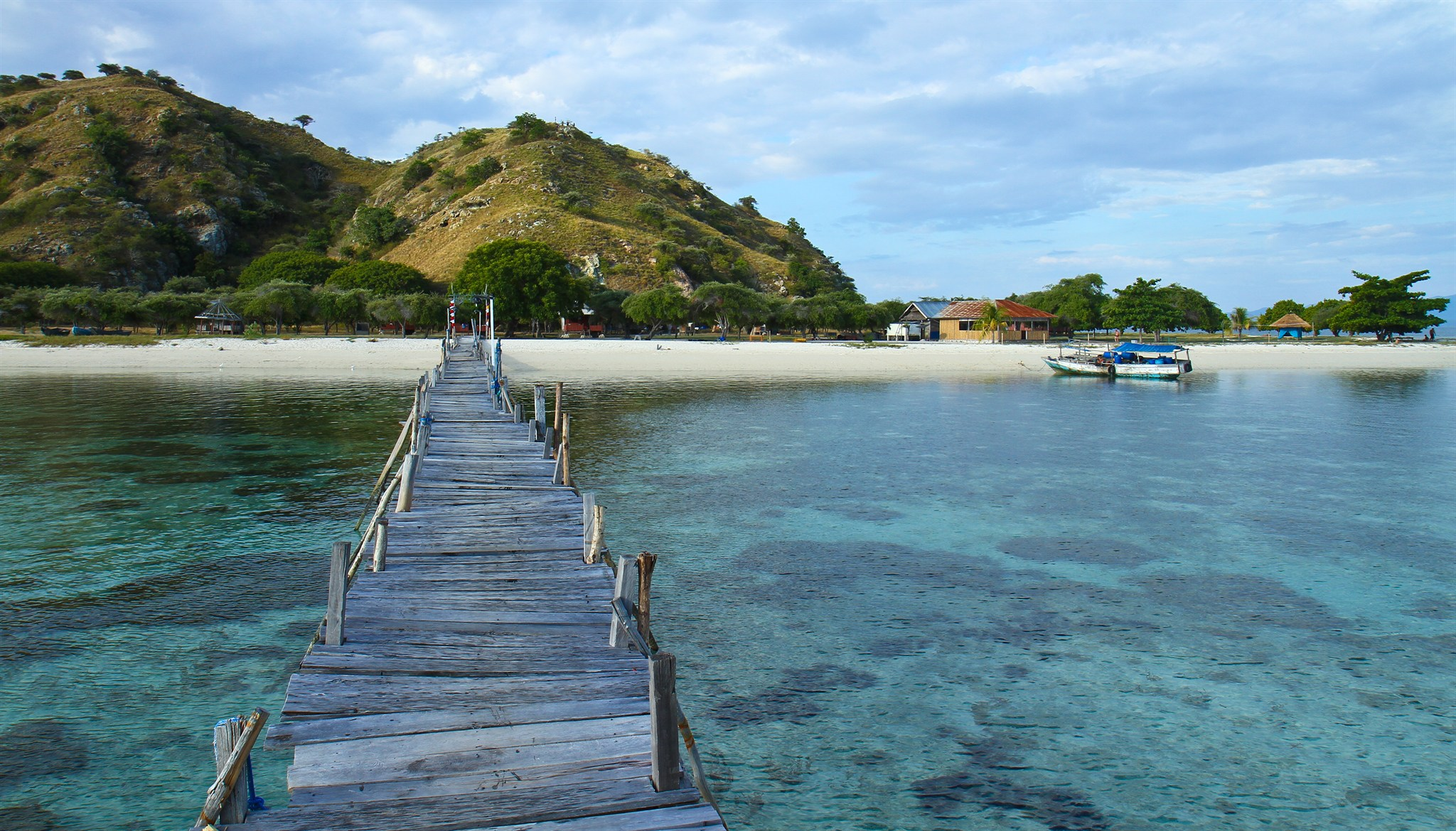
Kanawa Island at the borders of the Komodo Island.

East Nusa Tenggara is the southernmost province of Indonesia. The province consists of many small islands, often divided by deep oceanic trenches. The island's southern coast is affected by the swell of the Indian Ocean and produces large waves popular with surfers.

The relatively isolated position of these islands of the southern part of the Lesser Sunda Islands means that the evolution of life is localized. The most famous of the islands is the Komodo Island, the only island where the Komodo dragon can be found. Climate on this part of Indonesia is the driest climate in Indonesia. This combination of effects create a rare form of beaches in Indonesia: a relatively dry beach surrounded with endemic plants or dry cliffs.

- Beaches of Flores:
  - Pede Beach, Labuan Bajo.
- Beaches of Kanawa Island
- Beaches of Komodo Island
  - Pink Beach
- Beaches of Sumba:
  - Etreat Beach
  - Marosi Beach
  - Nihiwatu Beach. The world class surf spot known as Occy's Left featured in the film The Green Iguana is located on this beach. It is also a private beach that is owned by Nihi Sumba Resort. There are only 10 "surf slots" per day for Occy's Left which cost US$100 per surfer.
  - Tarikaha Beach
  - Wanokaka Beach
- Lasiana Beach, Kupang

== West Kalimantan ==
Notable beaches of West Kalimantan are located to the south of province, usually in the regencies of Bengkayang, Sambas, Mempawah, Ketapang Regency and Singkawang.

- Batu Payung Beach, Bengkayang
- Jawai Beach, Sambas.
- Kijing Beach, Mempawah, Pontianak Regency
- Kura-kura Beach, Bengkayang.
- Pasir Panjang Beach, Bengkayang
- Selimpai Beach, Sambas. The beach is known as a nesting beach for green sea turtle, hawksbill sea turtle, and olive ridley sea turtle
- Pantai Tanjung Burung, Mempawah
- Sungai Jawi Beach, Ketapang
- Tanjung Batu Beach, Ketapang

== Central Kalimantan ==
Beaches of Central Kalimantan is located to the south of the province.

- Kubu Beach, West Kotawaringin
- Sabaru Beach, Pahandut Subdistrict
- Ujung Pandaran Beach, East Kotawaringin

== South Kalimantan ==
- Swarangan Beach, Swarangan, Jorong Subdistrict, Tanah Laut
- Takisung Beach, Banjarmasin

== East Kalimantan ==
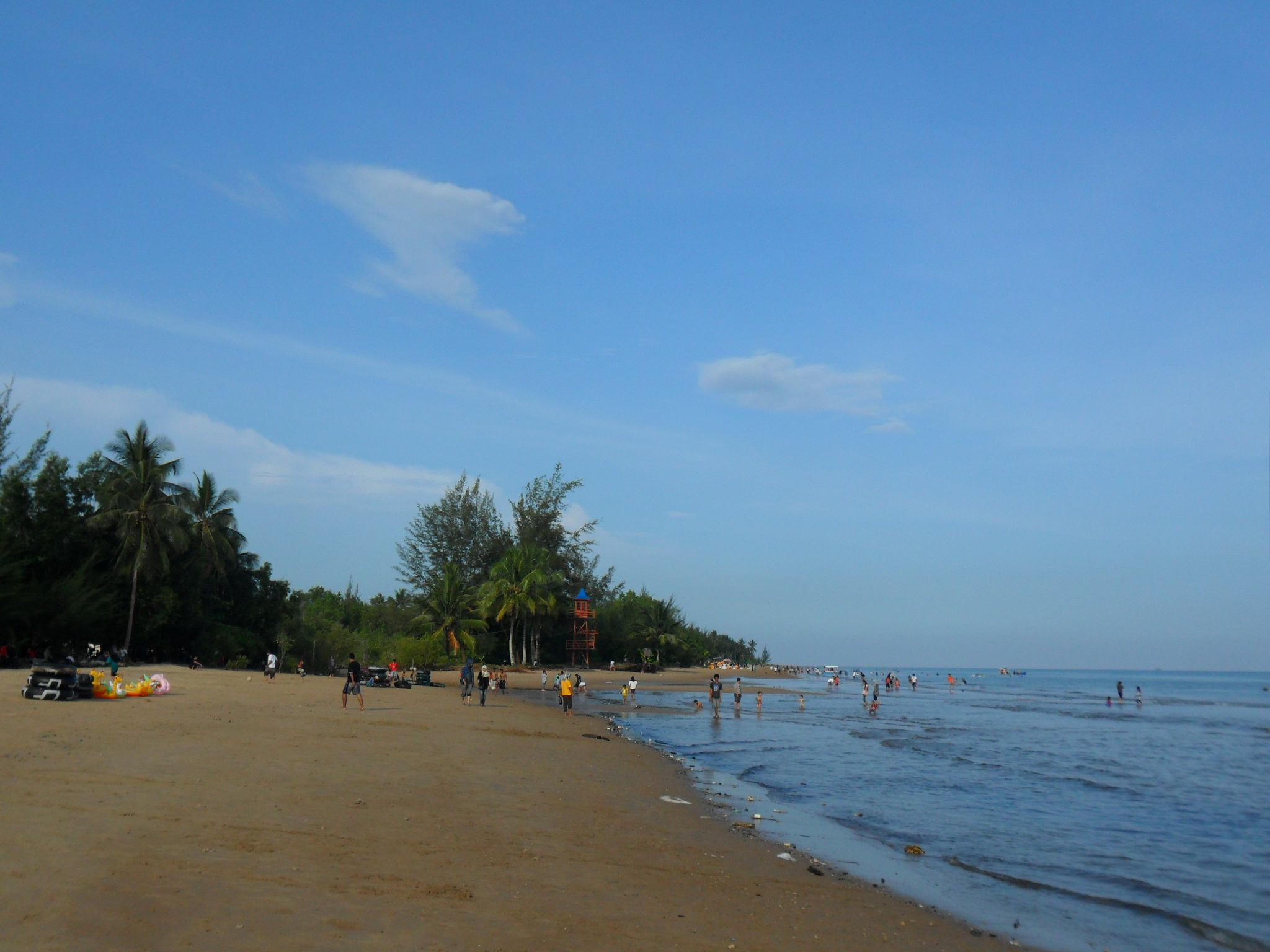
Manggar Beach near Balikpapan.

- Batu Lamampu Beach, Nunukan
- Lamaru Beach, Balikpapan
- Manggar Sagara Sari Beach, Balikpapan
- Marina Beach, Balikpapan
- Senipah Beach, Balikpapan
- Derawan Islands, Berau Regency, East Kalimantan. Derawan islands is a part of Coral Triangle and have at least two ponds contain unpoisoned jellyfish, one in Kakaban Island and the other in Maratua Island with Haji Buang Pond.

== Gorontalo ==
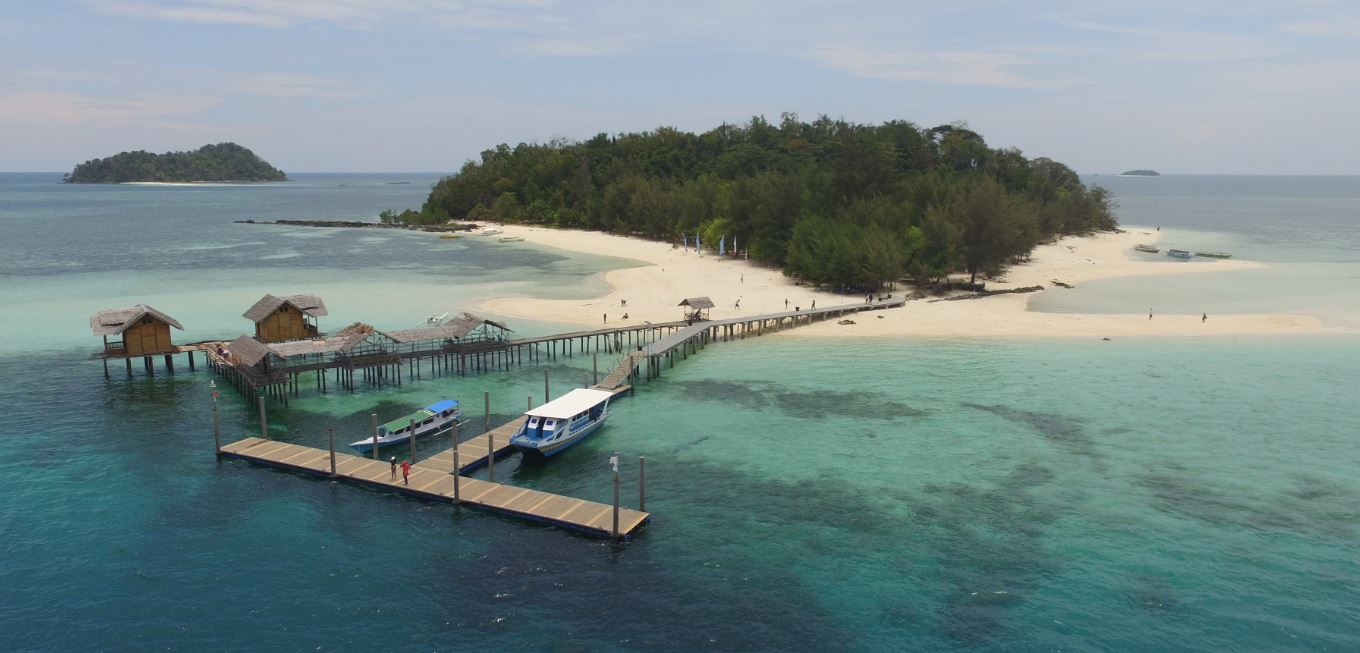
Saronde island

- Saronde Island. This is one of the most beautiful white sand beach in Indonesia. Can be reach in 40 minutes from Gorontalo Airport. Many International Cruiser and yacht visit this Island frequently every year.
- Lahilote Beach, Gorontalo. This brown sand beach has a clear calm water and contains a natural landmark which is a rock formed like the palm of a foot. The rock is said to be the footprint of Lahilote, a figure in local folklore.

== North Sulawesi ==
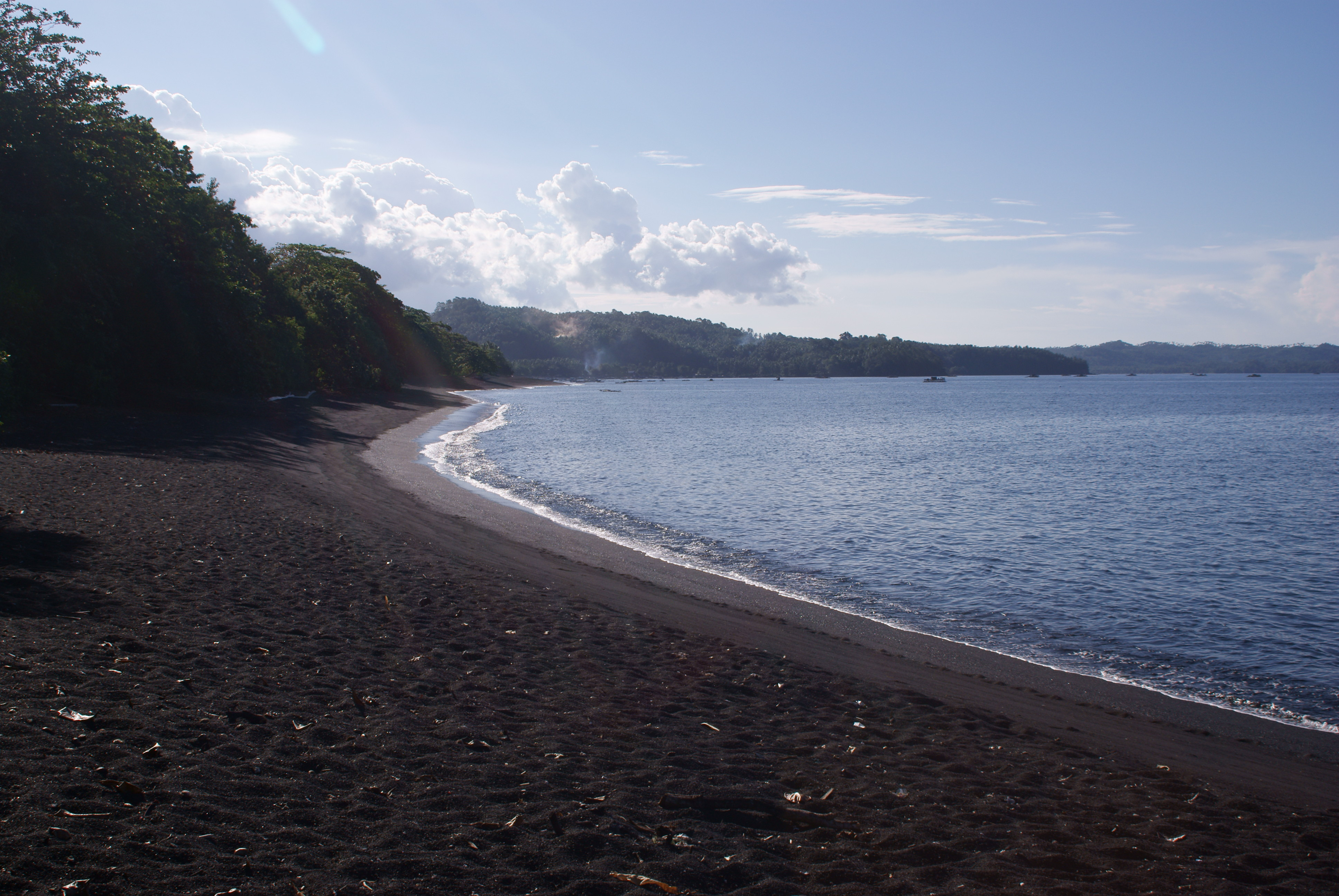
The black sand beach of Batuputih with Tangkoko Nature Reserve in the background.

The beaches of North Sulawesi are known for their high level of biodiversity due to their location within the Coral Triangle, making them a popular destination for snorkeling and diving.

- Batu Nona Beach, North Minahasa
- Batu Putih Beach, near Tangkoko Batuangus Nature Reserve
- Beaches of Bunaken Island
- Likupang Beach, Bitung. The beach is known for its white sand and the clear blue water.
- Tasik Ria Beach, Manado
- Temboko Lehi Beach, Siau

== Central Sulawesi ==
Some of the most notable beaches of Central Sulawesi are the beach resorts of Togian Islands, with their characteristic coral reefs and white sanded beaches. Togian is known as the only place in Indonesia with three major reef environments; atoll, barrier, and fringing reefs.

- Tanjung Karang Beach
- Boneoge Beach, Donggala
- Pusat Laut Beach, Donggala
- Lalos Beach, Toli-Toli
- Madale Beach, Poso
- Matako Beach, Poso
- Moian Beach, Taopa Subdistrict, Parigi Moutong
- Toini Beach, Poso
- Tumbelaka Beach, Palu
- Talise Beach, Palu
- Tumpapa Beach, Malakosa Village, Sausu Subdistrict, Parigi Moutong
- Togean Beach, Togean National Park

== Southeast Sulawesi ==
The beaches of Southeast Sulawesi are well known for marine biodiversity and are notable spot for scuba diving.

- Batauga Beach, Baubau
- Lanowulu Beach, Rawa Aopa Watumohai National Park. The beach is known for the mangrove forests.
- Nambo Beach, Kendari
- Nirwana Beach, Baubau

== South Sulawesi ==
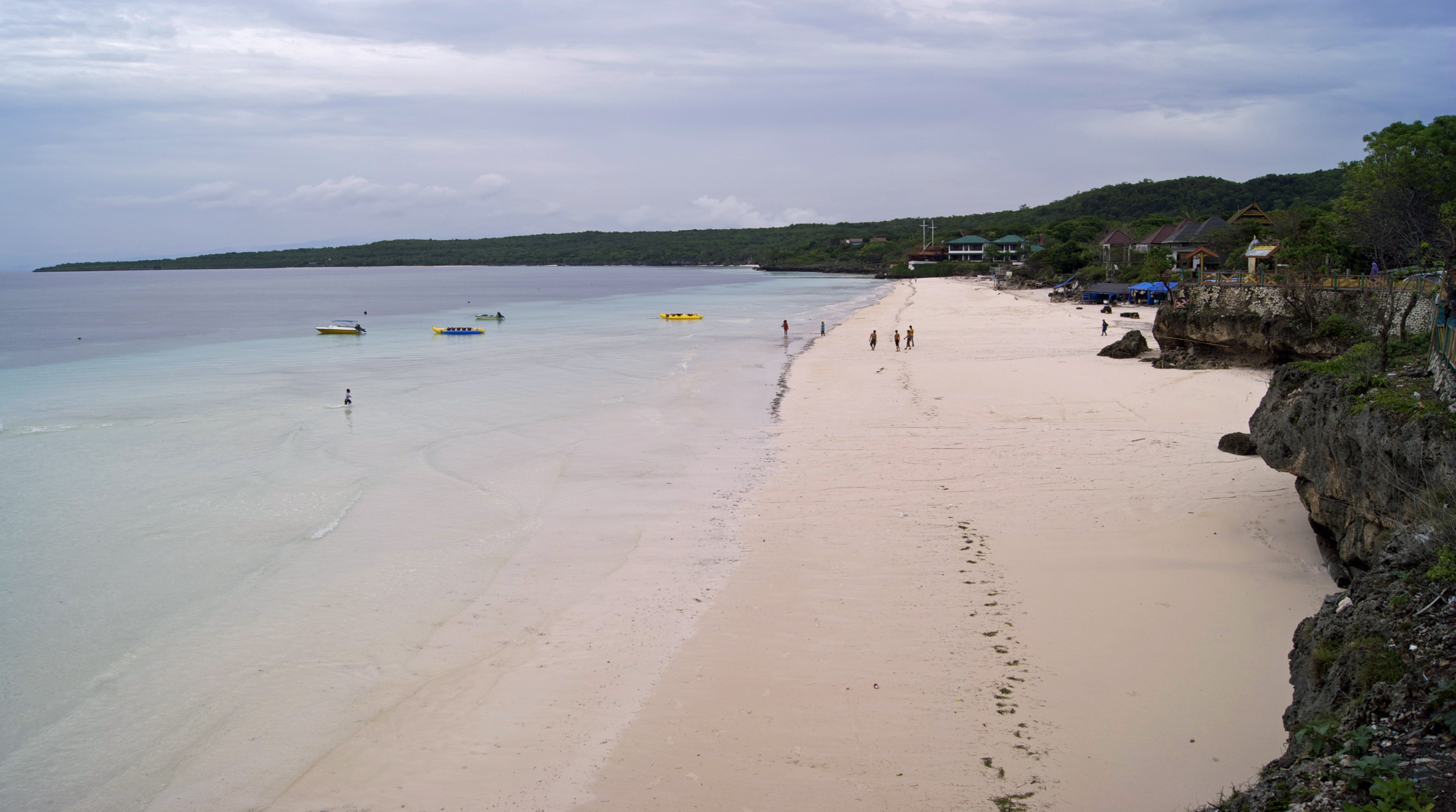
The beach of Tanjung Bira

The beaches of South Sulawesi are well known for its marine biodiversity and are noted for its scuba diving.

- Losari Beach, Makassar
- Beaches of Selayar Islands. The island is known for its white sand and clear water.
  - Baloyya Beach
- Tanjung Bira Beach, Bulukumba Regency. Tanjung Bira (English "Cape of Bira") contains three beaches: Pantai Bira, Pantai Timur, and Pantai Barat.

== North Maluku ==
Being insular in character, beaches are extensive in North Maluku. The beaches are well known for their white sand and calm blue water. The largest island of Maluku, Halmahera, has a yet unexploited potential for diving and beach tourism. Relic of World War II can be found in the white-sand beach of Zum Zum (Sum Sum) Island where locals still look for discarded WWII machine guns, shell casings, and other valuable scrap.

- Akasahu Beach, Tidore. The beach is popular for its hot spring pool.
- Sulamadaha Beach, Ternate

== Maluku ==
The more notables beaches of Maluku are well known for their white sand and clear water.

- Debut Beach, Debut Village, Southeast Maluku Regency A shrine was built on top of the cliff.
- Namalatu Beach, Ambon
- Natsepa Beach, Ambon
- Ngurbloat Beach (Pasir Panjang Beach), Ngilngof Village, Kai Kecil. The 3 km beach is best known for its white sanded beach whose softness is comparable to the softness of the flour.
- Ohoidertawun Beach, Ohoidertawun
- Ohoidertutu Beach, Kai Kecil
- Ora Beach, Saleman, North Seram
- Santai Beach, Ambon
- Serbat Beach, Dullah Island

== West Papua ==
One of the notable beaches of West Papua is the beach around Raja Ampat Islands. The sea around Raja Ampat contains the highest recorded marine life diversity on Earth.

== Papua ==
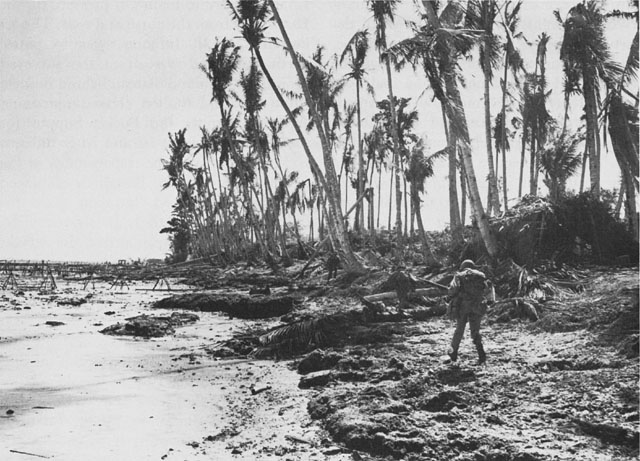
The southern beaches of Biak were used as landing sites by the United States Army during the Battle of Biak.

The northern coast of Papua is exposed to the Pacific Ocean. There are bordering beaches of sand and gravel, supplied mainly from rivers. Coral reefs are extensive in the northern coast. The southern coast of Papua is mainly covered in extensive swamps and beach formations are limited.

- Amai Beach, Jayapura
- Amban Beach, Amban
- Base-G Beach, Jayapura
- Beaches of Biak Island. During World War II, the beach in Biak Island was the site of the Battle of Biak, which was the first major tactical use of an ambush by the Japanese during the war.
  - Bosnik Beach
  - Korem Beach. The beach was destroyed by an earthquake and tsunami in 1996; the beach and the surrounding village has been rebuilt.
  - Marau Beach
  - Parai Beach. The beach contains a World War II Monument built by the Japanese government.
  - Warsa Beach
- Hamadi Beach, Jayapura. The beach is the site of a US amphibious landing on April 22, 1944. The beach contains a number of World War II wrecks and a World War II monument.
- Holtekamp Beach, Jayapura
- Ketuapi Beach, Yapen
- Mariadei Beach, Yapen
- Tanjung Ria Beach, Jayapura

== See also ==
- List of beaches
