= Padang (disambiguation) =

Padang is a city in West Sumatra, Indonesia.

Padang may also refer to:

== Indonesia ==
- Padang Island, in Riau province, Indonesia
- Padang Padang is a beach in Bali, Indonesia
- Padang dialect of the Minangkabau language
  - Padang cuisine, the cuisine of the Minangkabau people
  - Sate Padang a meat dish from Padang, West Sumatra

== Malaysia ==
- Merdeka Square, Kuala Lumpur, formerly Padang, a square in Malaysia

== Singapore ==
- Padang, Singapore, a playing field

== Sudan ==
- Padang people, an ethnic group indigenous to Sudan, a subgroup of the Dinka
  - Dinka language
