= Dreamland Beach =

Beach in Bali, Indonesia

Coordinates: 08°47′58″S 115°07′04″E

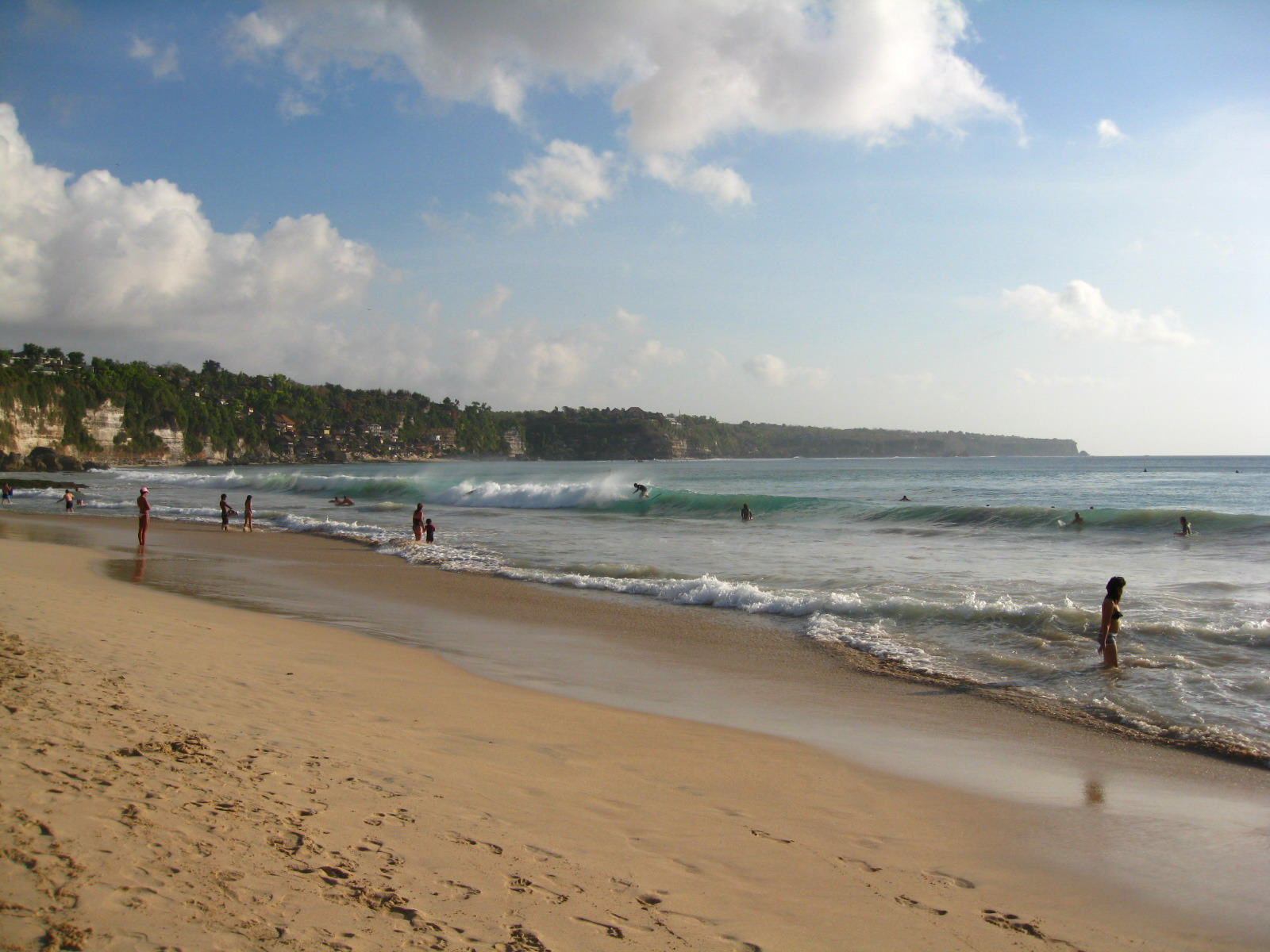
Dreamland Beach, 2008

Dreamland Beach, now officially known as New Kuta Beach, is a beach located in Pecatu on the Bukit Peninsula on the island of Bali, Indonesia. A popular surfing beach, it was formerly secluded and had casual refreshment stands and inns. It has since become the beach of an extensive tourist development.

The beach, called Cimongka by the Balinese, was named Dreamland Beach by Australians. It was popular with surfers and also with nudists, and became the most popular beach in Pecatu. Starting in the 1980s, warungs (refreshment shacks) and cheap inns were built at the beach.

PT Bali Pecatu Graha, a company owned by Tommy Suharto, the youngest son of former Indonesian president Suharto, bought land including the beach in 1995 and the following year began development of the 400-hectare Pecatu Indah Resort; the beach was renamed New Kuta Beach and the resort eventually also became New Kuta Beach. Development was paused from 1998 to 2004 because of the Asian financial crisis and the 2002 Bali bombings; in the late 2000s, at least 38 businesses were relocated from the beach to purpose-built shops.

The beach remains open to the public.

== Uluwatu Temple ==
Uluwatu Temple is about 12 km from the Dreamland Beach.

== See also ==
- List of beaches in Indonesia
