= Amban Beach =

Beach in Indonesia

Coordinates: 0.815389°S 134.079389°E

Pantai Amban is a beach on the northeast head of the Bird's Head Peninsula, West Papua, Indonesia, 3 kilometres (1.9 mi) north of Amban village and 7 kilometres (4.3 mi) north of Manokwari. Surrounded by tropical forest and swampland, the black sand beach is a notable surfing spot.

== See also ==
- List of beaches in Indonesia
