= Blebak Beach =

Tourist beach in Central Java, Indonesia

Coordinates: 6.1268°S 110.4°E

Blebak Beach also known as Pantai Blebak is a tourist beach in Sekuro Village, Jepara, Central Java. This beach is located 10 km southward of the hall of the Office of the Regent of Jepara.

== Access ==
Blebak Beach is located in the village of Sekuro, District Mlonggo, Jepara regency. No need to worry about the access road to the beach Blebak in the District of Mlonggo. Besides not too far from the center of Jepara, All access road condition is very good.

== Panorama ==
A clean beach among the fragments of fine coral is truly uplifting for comfort and peace of mind. The location is very far from the crowds, with dry and cool air that soothes the soul in tranquility, in line with the fatigue that compels us to rest. It is an area that has not been widely reached, with simple mangrove forests and views of fishermen's boats, accompanied by a stunning sunset atmosphere. It is indeed simple, but in its simplicity, you may not find a similar ambiance elsewhere. There is nothing wrong with trying to clear our minds amidst the white sand and the clean atmosphere among the relentless waves that never tire of chasing each other.

== Vehicle ==
Blebak Beach has several rides, namely:

- Sapta Pesona Boats
- Water Bike Pedal Boats
- pedicab Water
- Canoe
- Banana Boat
- Donut buoy (float tire in the car)
- Duck Buoy (buoys form of a duck)
- Kid's Park (Playground Children)

== Facility ==
Blebak beach has several facilities, namely:

- Mosque
- Rinse Room
- Toilet
- Trash can
- Parking Park for Car, Motorcycle, and Bicycle
