= Mesjid Raya =

District of Aceh Besar, Aceh

- District
- Interactive map of Mesjid Raya
- Coordinates: 5°35′27.3682″N 95°30′46.228″E
- Country: Indonesia
- Province: Aceh
- Regency: Aceh Besar
- District seat: Krueng Raya

Area
  - Total: 129.93 km^{2} (50.17 sq mi)

Population (2020)
  - Total: 21,231
  - Density: 163.40/km^{2} (423.21/sq mi)
- Time zone: UTC+7 (WIB)
- Postal Code: 23381
- Villages: 13

Mesjid Raya is a district (kecamatan) in Aceh Besar Regency, Aceh, Indonesia. As of 2020, it had a population of 21,231 and covers an area of 129.93 km².

== Geography ==
=== Mukims and villages ===
There are two mukims (townships/subdistricts) in Mesjid Raya, which are Mukim Krueng Raya and Mukim Lamnga with 13 villages (gampong):

Mukim Krueng Raya

- Beurandeh
- Ie Seum (Ie Seuuem)
- Lamreh (Lam Reh)
- Meunasah Keude
- Meunasah Kulam
- Meunasah Mon
- Paya Kameng
- Ruyung

Mukim Lamnga

- Durung
- Gampong Baro
- Ladong
- Lamnga
- Neuheun
