= Logending Beach =

Beach in Central Java, Kebumen, Indonesia

Coordinates: 7.7277°S 109.3939°E

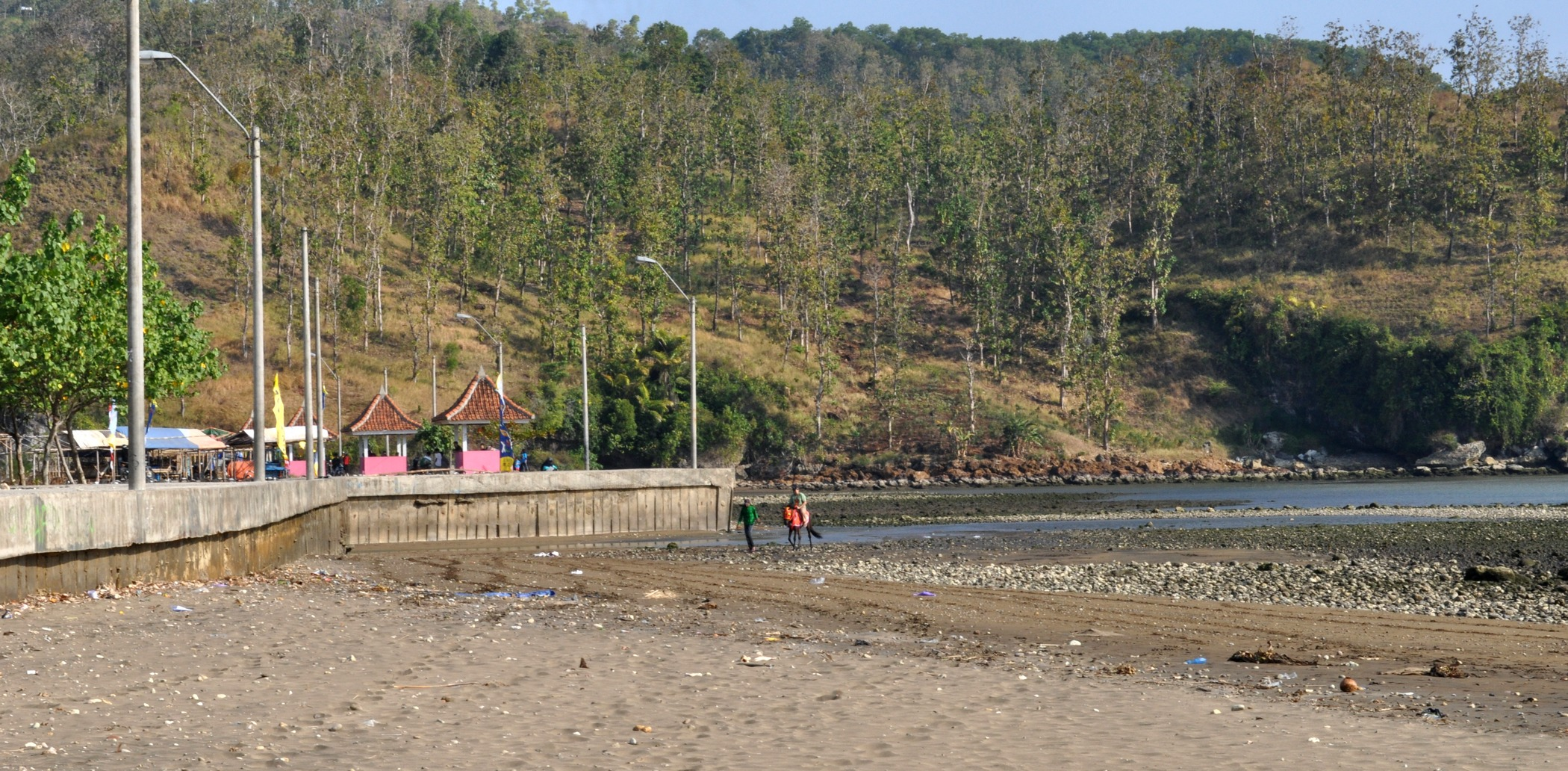
Logending Beach

Logending Beach is a beach located in the district of Central Java province, Kebumen, Indonesia. Logending Beach is also referred to as Ayah Beach because it is located in the coastal village of Ayah. Facilities at Logending Beach include a parking area, toilets, boat rental, and a lookout tower.
