= Wedi Ireng Beach =

Beach in East Java, Indonesia

- Beach
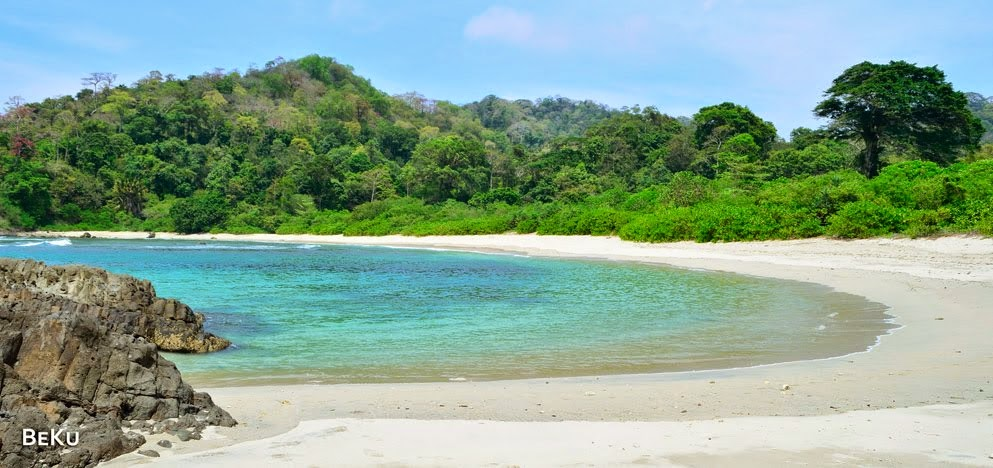
- Wedi Ireng, Pancer, Banyuwangi

- Location within Java
- Coordinates: 8°19′58″S 112°19′17″E

Wedi Ireng beach is located in Pancer, Banyuwangi, East Java, Indonesia. It is approximately 3 km from Red Island (Pulau Merah) and 65 km to the south of Banyuwangi city. The beach does not attract many visitors, allowing it to remain natural. It is called “Wedi Ireng” because of the color of its sand. In Javanese, wedi means sand and ireng means black. The sand color of the beach is actually white, but if the white sand was dredged, the black sand would appear.

== Gallery ==
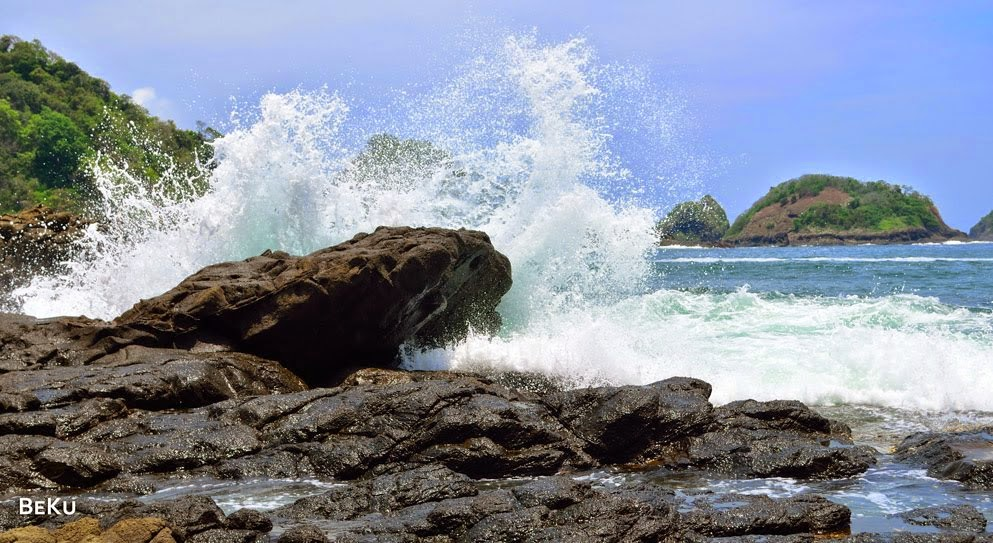
The Wave of Wedi Ireng

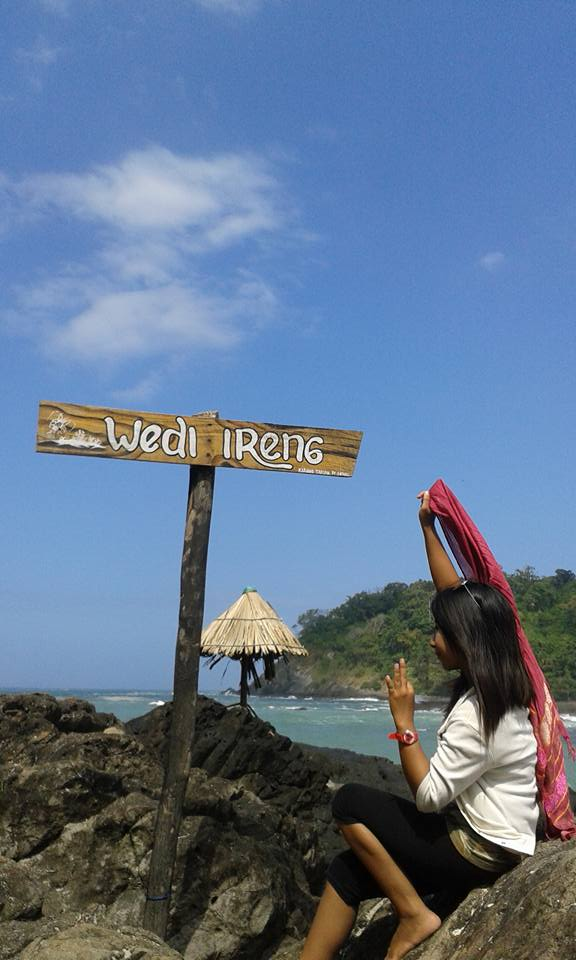
The Scenery of Beach

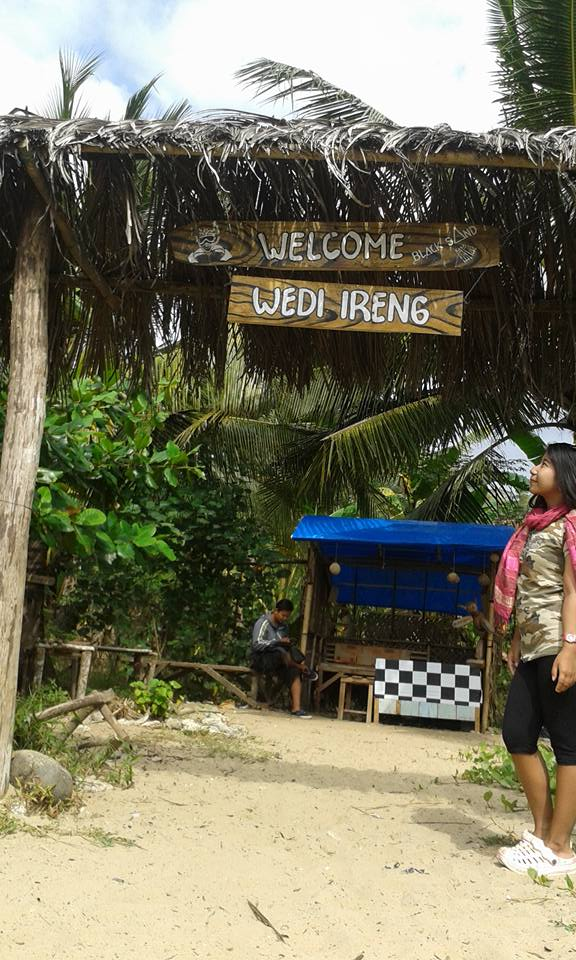
The Main Gate of Wedi Ireng
