= Pecatu =

Region of the Bukit Peninsula of Bali

Coordinates: 8.8247°S 115.1119°E

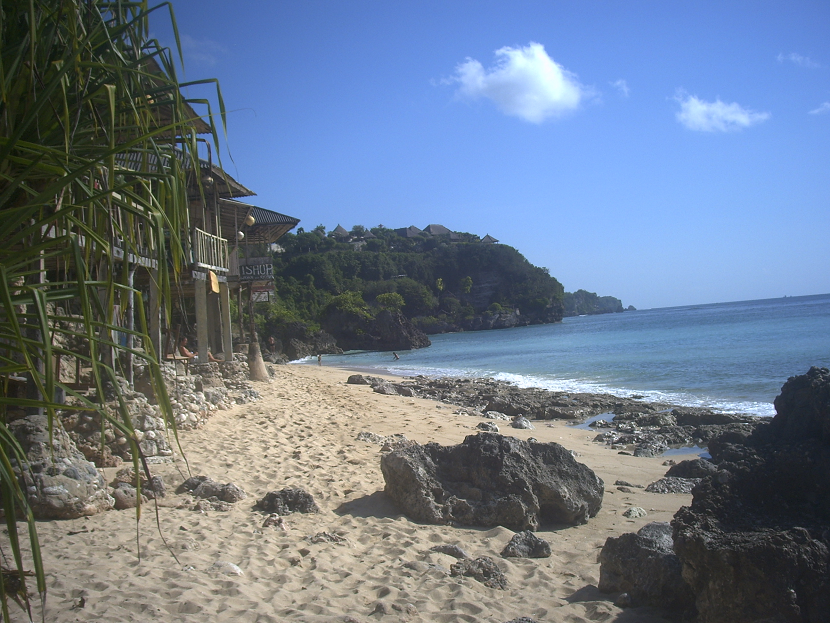
Bingin Beach

Pecatu is a village (desa) in South Kuta, Bali, Indonesia. Located in the western side of the Bukit Peninsula, its hilly landscape creates smaller, more isolated beaches than at Nusa Dua on the eastern side of the peninsula. It is popular with surfers and also with nudists. The Uluwatu Temple is also located at Pecatu.

== Location and administration ==
Pecatu is located in South Kuta District of Badung Regency. It is at the western end of the Bukit Peninsula in south Bali, and has a hilly topography with limestone cliffs isolating small, short beaches that have been privately developed. Nusa Dua, on the opposite side of the peninsula, is flat and is a government-run resort with free access. Beaches at Pecatu have historically been popular with surfers and because of limited access, with nudists.

Ungasang is east and Jimbaran is north-east.

== History ==
Beaches at Pecatu such as Dreamland Beach, now New Kuta Beach, were well known to surfers and also prized by nudists; Dreamland was named by Australian tourists. Warungs (refreshment shacks) and cheap accommodations grew up on and near the beaches.

Development started in 1996 with Pecatu Indah Resort, on a site including Dreamland Beach, by Bali Pecatu Graha, a company owned by Tommy Suharto. Macadamed roads and a golf course had been created when the 1997 Asian financial crisis caused work to be stopped. The financial crisis and the 2002 Bali bombings reduced tourism in Bali, but tourists returned and development resumed in the mid-oughties, including Kuta Golf Links Resort, developed in partnership with Made G. Putrawan, and another golf course resort, Hole 17, developed by Panorama Development Utama. The warungs were removed and have been replaced with permanent shops that are not on the beach. The development of New Kuta Beach was planned to include a convention center and several luxury hotels.

== Desalination ==
The area lacks fresh water. A seawater desalination plant with a production capacity of 3,000 cubic meters per day has been constructed.

== Tourism ==
=== Waterpark ===
A waterpark named New Kuta Green Park opened in December 2010 and fully opened in January 2011. According to Tommy Suharto, it was hoped that this attraction would also be affordable to local people who could not afford the resorts.

=== Beaches ===
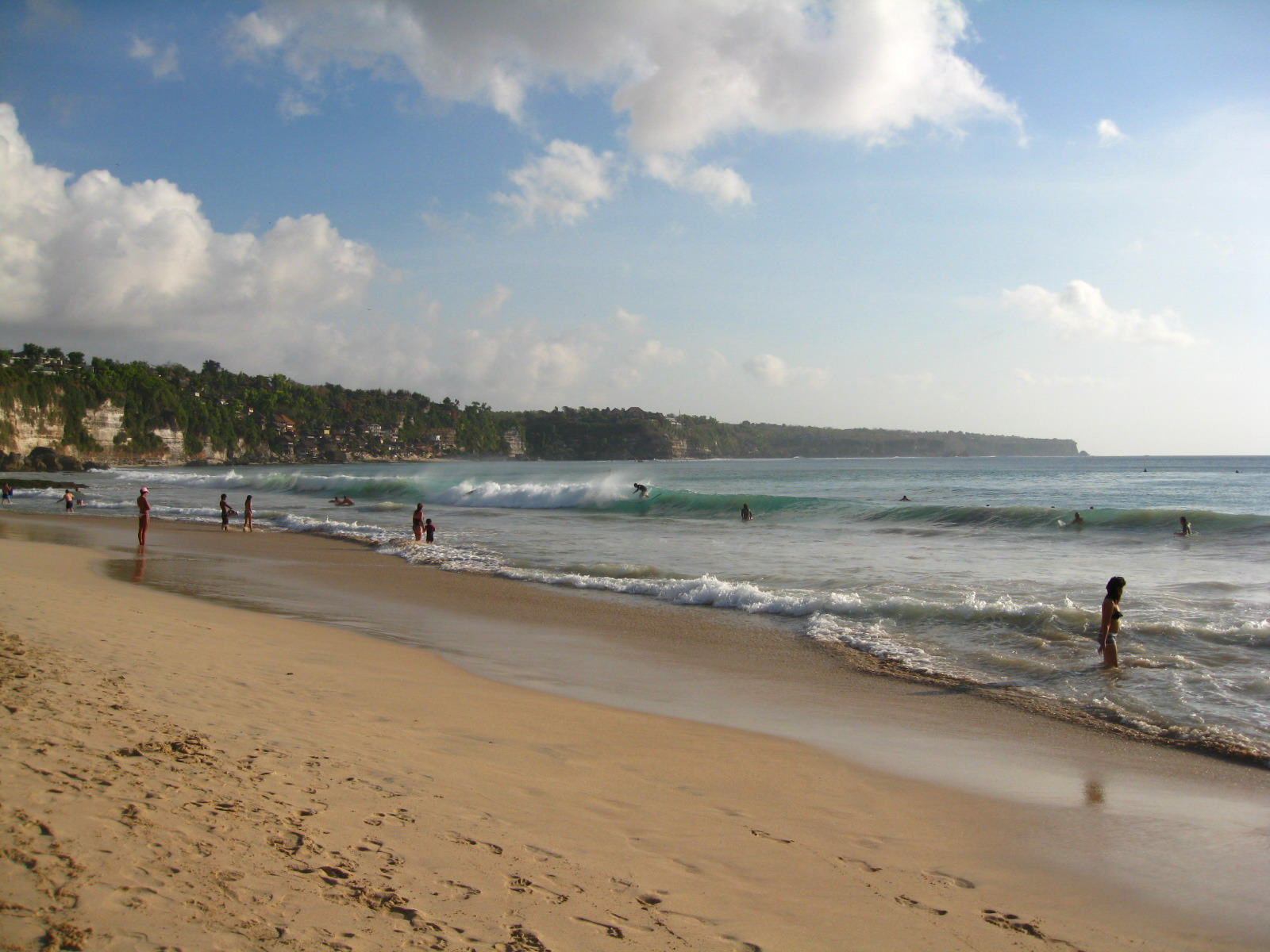
New Kuta Beach, formerly Dreamland Beach

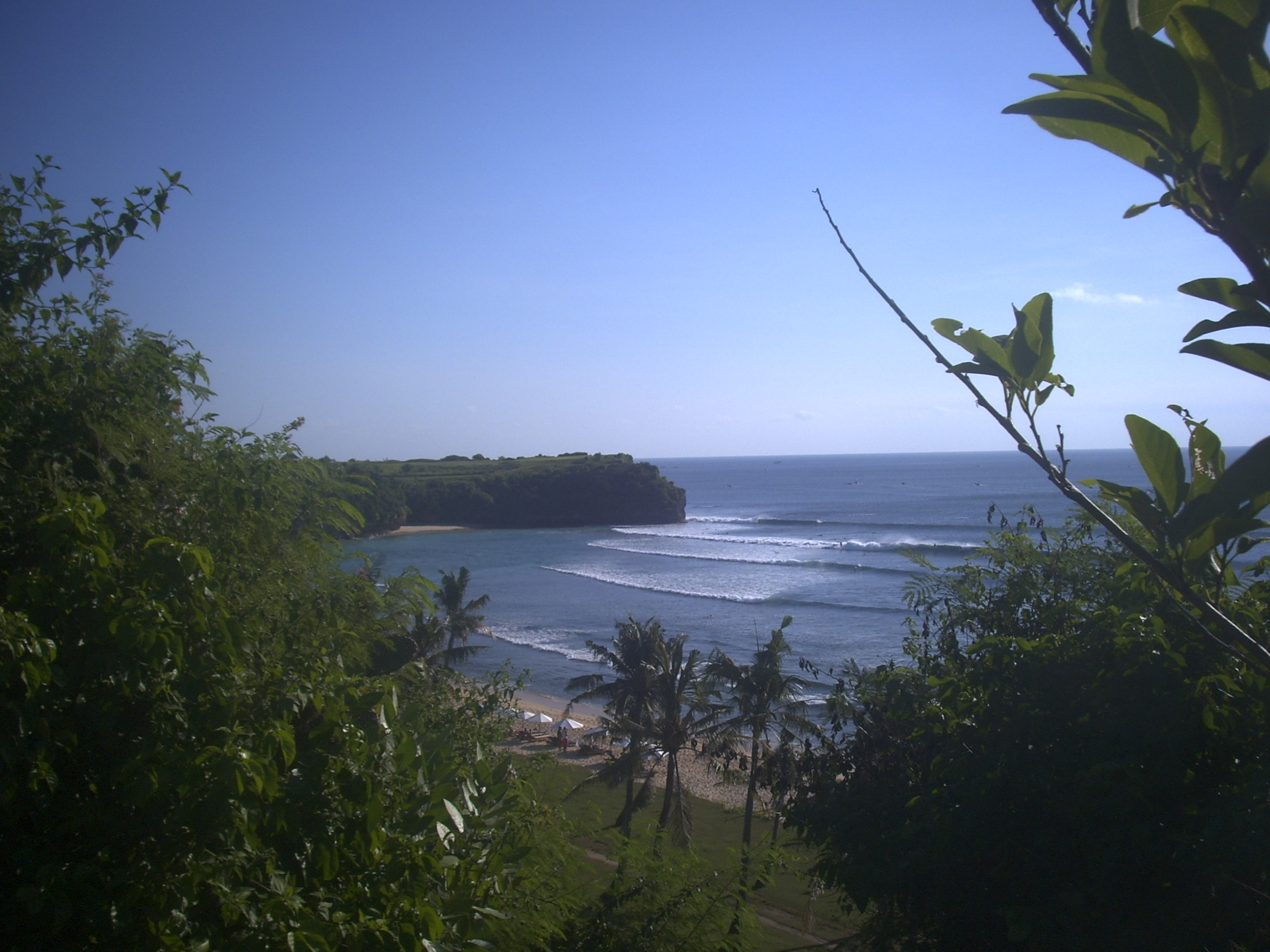
Balangan Beach

The village has several beaches that are particularly popular for surfing.

New Kuta Beach is a popular surfing beach concealed by cliffs. Originally named by Australians, it was renamed New Kuta Beach as part of the development of the Pecatu Indah Resort and New Kuta Golf.

Balangan Beach is a surf spot located just north of New Kuta Beach. It has road access but is less crowded than Kuta or other surfing beaches in Bali.

Bingin Beach is 1 km south of New Kuta Beach, 10 km by road. It is a popular surfing beach but not recommended for novices because of a reef bed. Its beauty makes it more appealing than New Kuta Beach for nonaquatic activities.

Padang Padang Beach is 3 km southwest of Bingin Beach. The access to the beach is a path between a fallen rock and a cliffside. The beach remains natural. The beach is a world class surf beach and the site of the annual Rip Curl surfing contest. It was a filming location for Eat Pray Love, starring Julia Roberts.

Suluban Beach is west of Padang-Padang Beach; access is through a cave, and the beach is usually quiet. It has a wide expanse of sand even at high tide.

Impossible Beach is located between Bingin and Padang Padang, and is so called for its fast racing wave that is almost impossible to surf.

Nyang Nyang Beach is a hidden beach, reached via a jungle pathway and a long stairway. It has large waves suitable for surfing.

Pandawa Beach is the newest beach to be developed in the area. Located a 20-minute drive from Garuda Wisnu Kencana, it has been developed by the administration of Badung Regency in Kutuh Village, South Kuta District. It was formerly known as the "secret beach" because it lay behind two cliffs with limited access. A 1.5-kilometer flanking cliff-cut road now provides full vehicle access. Paragliding can be done at Timbis Hill, not far away from the Pandawa Beach. There are no hotels or condos in the beach and access road areas, because of opposition from the local Kutuh people.

=== Hotels and resorts ===
Since the discovery of Pecatu to the West in the 1970s, the village has become a magnet for international luxury hotels and resorts that take advantage of the village's cliffside setting. These include Alila, Anantara, Bulgari, Jumeirah, Radisson Blu, Six Senses, and Wyndham.
