= Bau Nyale =

Festival in Lombok

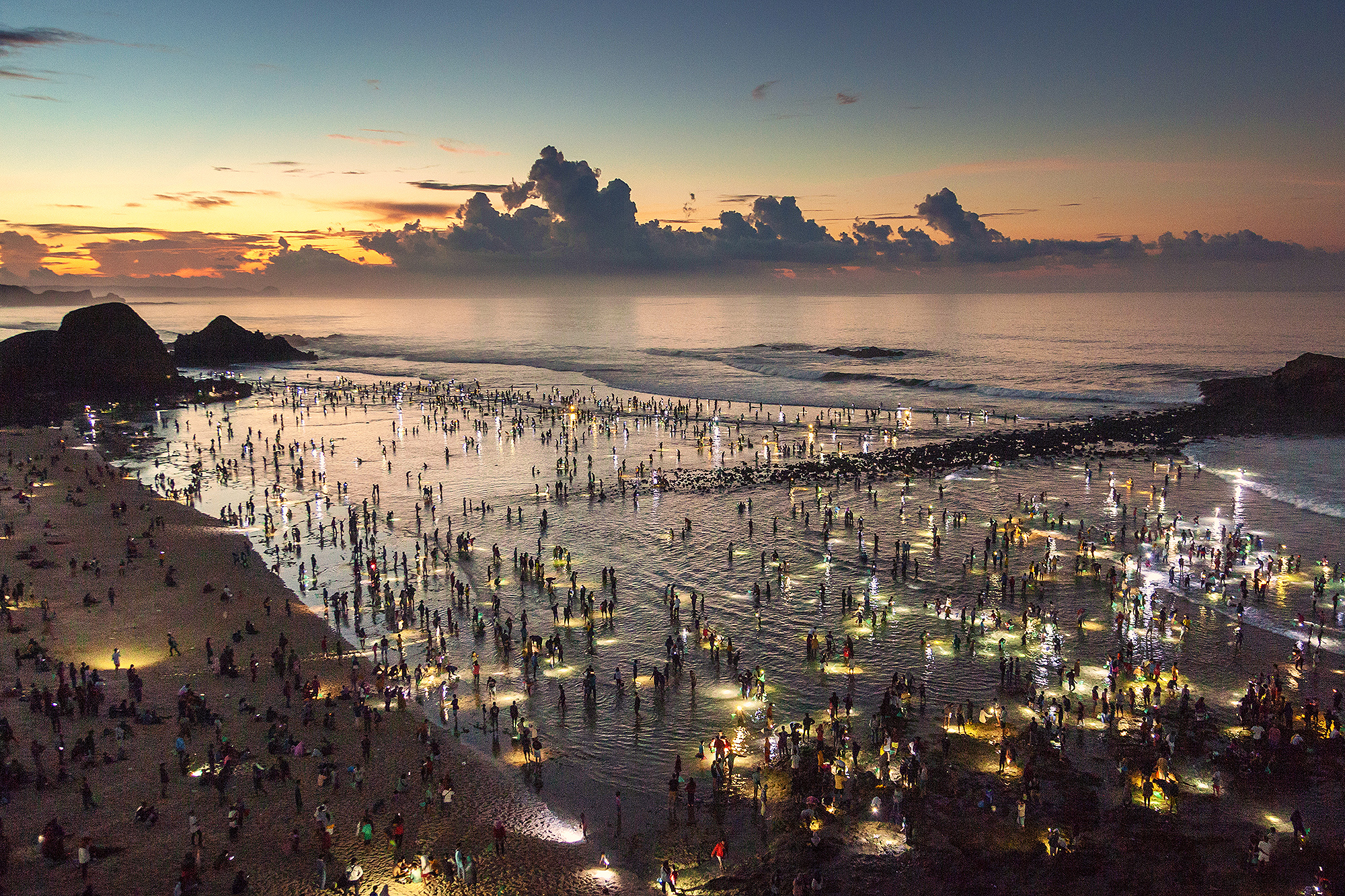
- The worms emerge at night, and are collected before sunrise.
- Observed by: People of Lombok, along with tourists
- Type: Ethnic
- Date: Sasak Calendar: 20th Day of the 10th Month
- 2026 date: 7-8 February

Bau Nyale is a festival on the island of Lombok, being the culmination of several days of festivities. Based on the Sasak Calendar, it occurs in February or March of a given year, and involves the collection of marine worms (referred to as "nyale" and predominantly being polychaetes) as they emerge to spawn.

Bau Nyale is officially recognized as part of Indonesia's non-material cultural heritage.

== Origins ==
According to legend, the worms are linked to a princess, sometimes recounted as Princess Denda Sukadana, but most often as Princess Mandalika. The princess was sought after by many suitors, though she was unable to select one. To prevent conflict and maintain harmony between the kingdoms of Lombok, she gathered the people and declared that she would not belong just to one of them, before casting herself into the ocean. Eventually, there emerged a swarm of sea worms, which were believed to be the incarnation of the princess. From then on, the people of Lombok would descend to the seashore to collect these worms, partaking in the bounty.

An alternate legend originates from Western Sumbawa; here, it is believed that the worms originate from Adam, who is said to have lost his turban near the coastline. The turban was unraveled by the waves, and its threads became sea worms that would benefit the children of Adam (mankind).

== Events ==
Various festivities accompany Bau Nyale, such as the presentation of offerings, singing, dancing, traditional music, recitation of poetry, gift-giving, boat racing, and a reenactment of Princess Mandalika's tale. The festival is mainly held on Seger Beach, though may occur elsewhere when MotoGP is held (see Mandalika International Street Circuit).

People gather the night before Bau Nyale and make camp. Worm-collecting begins after midnight and ends at sunrise, and collectors use lights and hand nets to collect the worms. The worms are divided into the early emergers (nyale tunggak) and the late emergers (nyale poto). 3 polychaete species were collected and identified during the Bau Nyale of 1992 to 1993: Lysidice collaris, Eunice siciliensis, and Dendronereides heteropoda. The worms are seen as bringing luck, and are used as ritual ingredients, traditional medicine, as food, along with improving relations between community members, as well as to generate tourism.

Similar practices are done throughout the Pacific, including on Ambon.
