= Padang Padang Beach =

Famous beach in Indonesia

- Tropical beach
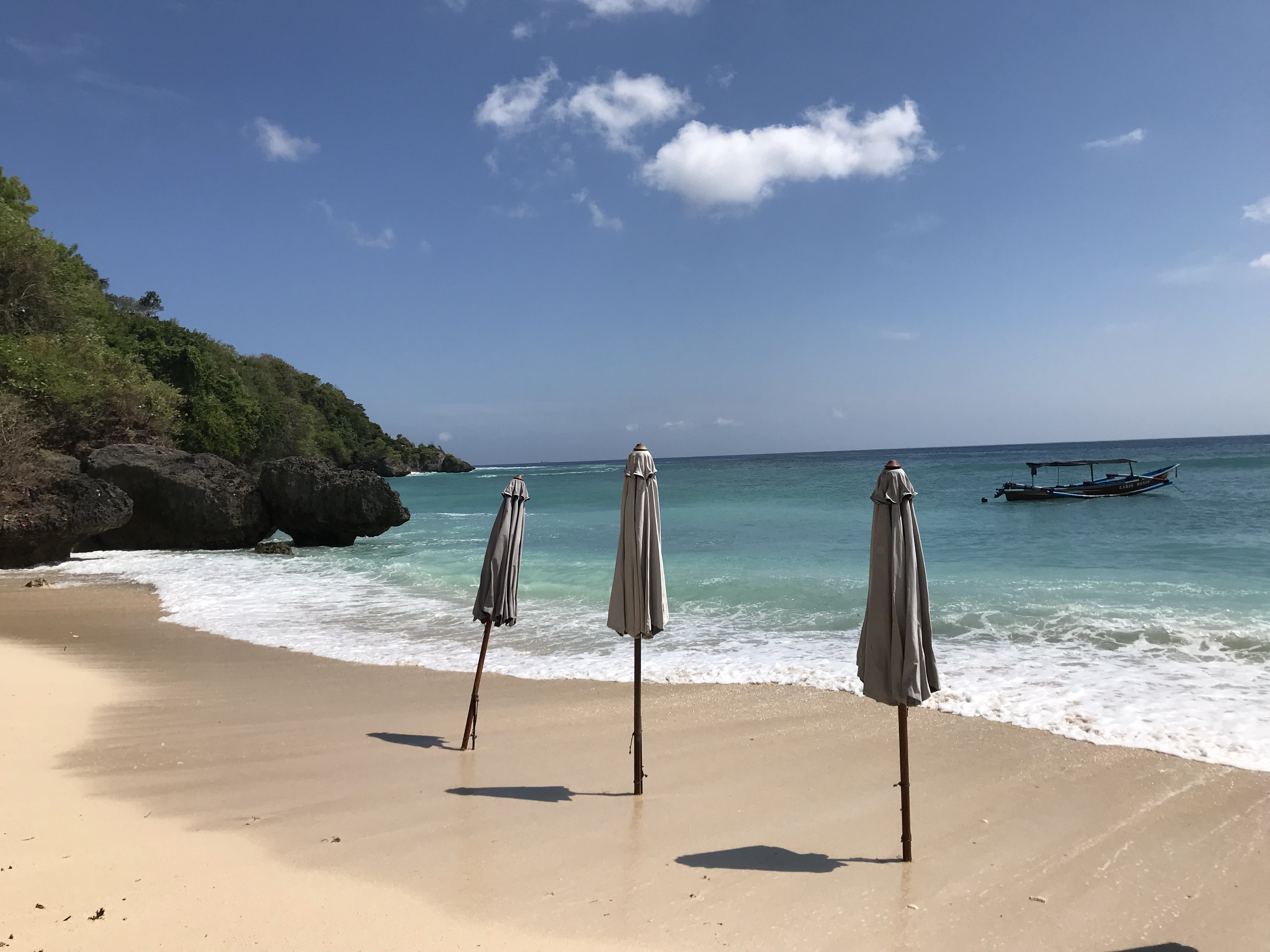
- View of Padang Padang Beach
- Coordinates: 8.81114°S 115.1012°E
- Location: Pecatu, Bali, Indonesia

Padang Padang Beach (Pantai Padang Padang) is a 110-metre-long (120 yd) sandy beach in Pecatu on the Bukit Peninsula in Bali, Indonesia. It is characterised by fine white sand and tall cliffs.

The beach is known by locals as Labuan Sait Beach.

== Location ==
Padang Padang Beach is situated on the west coast of the Bukit Peninsula, approximately 3km southwest of the popular Bingin Beach and about one hour drive from Denpasar.

The access to the beach is down 120 steps and a path between a fallen rock and the cliffside. There is an entrance fee. The beach is renowned for monkeys that steal people's belongings.

== Activities ==
The beach is a world-class surf beach with a famous surf break known as Padang Padang Left (nicknamed the Balinese Pipeline). The spot is among the top five surfing spots in the world when the conditions are right.

It is the site of the annual Rip Curl Cup surfing contest that sees some of the world's most renowned and talented tube riders compete against one another.

== Filming Location ==
Padang Padang gained international fame as one of the filming locations for the 2010 movie Eat Pray Love, starring Julia Roberts. The film showcased the stunning beauty of the beach and contributed to its popularity among tourists.

== Go Boat ==
The GoBoat is a fast boat service that connects Uluwatu with Canggu, reducing the journey time to 35 minutes. Padang Padang Beach is the location of the ferry terminal in Uluwatu and Nelayan Beach is the ferry terminal in Canggu.
