= List of districts and sub-districts in Badung Regency =

The following is a list of districts and villages in Badung Regency. Badung Regency comprises 6 districts, sub-divided into 16 urban (kelurahan) and 46 rural (desa) villages. As at mid 2025, the population was officially estimated at 539,718, with an area of 398,75 km² and a density of 1,353.5 people per km^{2}.

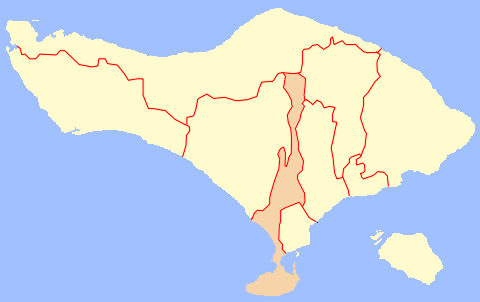
Map of Badung Regency in Bali

Map of districts in Badung Regency

List of districts and villages in Badung Regency as follows:

Code	Districts	Urban villages	Rural villages	Status	List
51.03.03	Abiansemal	-	18	Rural villages	Abiansemal; Angantaka; Ayunan; Blahkiuh; Bongkasa; Bongkasa Pertiwi; Darmasaba; Dauh Yeh Cani; Jagapati; Mambal; Mekar Bhuana; Punggul; Sangeh; Sedang; Selat; Sibang Gede; Sibang Kaja; Taman
51.03.01	Kuta	5	-	Urban villages	Kedonganan; Tuban; Kuta; Legian; Seminyak
51.03.05	South Kuta	3	3	Rural villages	Pecatu; Ungasan; Kutuh
51.03.05	South Kuta	3	3	Urban villages	Benoa; Tanjung Benoa; Jimbaran
51.03.06	North Kuta	3	3	Rural villages	Canggu; Dalung; Tibubeneng
51.03.06	North Kuta	3	3	Urban villages	Kerobokan; Kerobokan Kelod; Kerobokan Kaja
51.03.02	Mengwi	5	15	Rural villages	Baha; Buduk; Cemagi; Gulingan; Kekeran; Kuwum; Mengwi; Mengwitani; Munggu; Penarungan; Pererenan; Sembung; Sobangan; Tumbak Bayuh; Werdi Bhuwana
51.03.02	Mengwi	5	15	Urban villages	Abianbase; Kapal; Lukluk; Sading; Sempidi
51.03.04	Petang		7	Rural villages	Belok; Carangsari; Getasan; Pangsan; Pelaga; Petang; Sulangai
	TOTAL	16	46		

== See also ==
- List of districts of Indonesia
- List of districts of Bali
- Subdivisions of Indonesia
