= Kuta District =

Kuta
- District

- Location of Kuta District within Badung Regency
- Country: Indonesia
- Region: Lesser Sunda Islands
- Province: Bali
- Regency: Badung

Area
  - Total: 22.19 km^{2} (8.57 sq mi)

Population (mid 2025 estimate)
  - Total: 58,474
  - Density: 2,635/km^{2} (6,825/sq mi)
- Website: kuta.badungkab.go.id

Kuta District (Indonesian: Kecamatan Kuta) is an administrative district (kecamatan) within Badung Regency of Bali, Indonesia. It is Bali's and Indonesia's most internationally oriented and touristic district, home to the world famous Kuta Beach. The district covers a land area of 22.19 km^{2} and was home to 86,657 people as of the 2010 census, after phenomenal growth in the previous decade as workers moved in to support the tourist industry. To the north is Kuta North District, and the south is Kuta South District (which encompasses the Bukit Badung Peninsula and the fishing village of Jimbaran). It contains five villages, listed below from south to north with their areas and their populations at the 2010 Census and 2020 Census, together with the official estimates as at mid 2025.

Name	Area in km^{2}	Pop'n 2010 Census	Pop'n 2020 Census	Pop'n mid 2025 Estimate
Kedonganan	2.27	19,735	8,539	7,895
Tuban	5.64	22,947	21,235	22,863
Kuta (village)	7.78	37,902	20,228	18,796
Legian	3.04	8,759	4,902	4,773
Seminyak	3.47	6,140	4,256	4,147
Totals	22.19	95,482	59,160	58,474

Subsequent to 2010 the population of Kuta District has declined, reaching 59,160 at the 2020 census, and with an estimated 58,474 people in mid 2025, notably including a large number of Muslims although the majority is still Hindu, unusually high for any virtually any part of Bali outside of Denpasar. This includes Tuban where the Ngurah Rai International Airport sits on reclaimed land.
