= Pandawa Beach =

Beach in Bali, Indonesia

- Beach
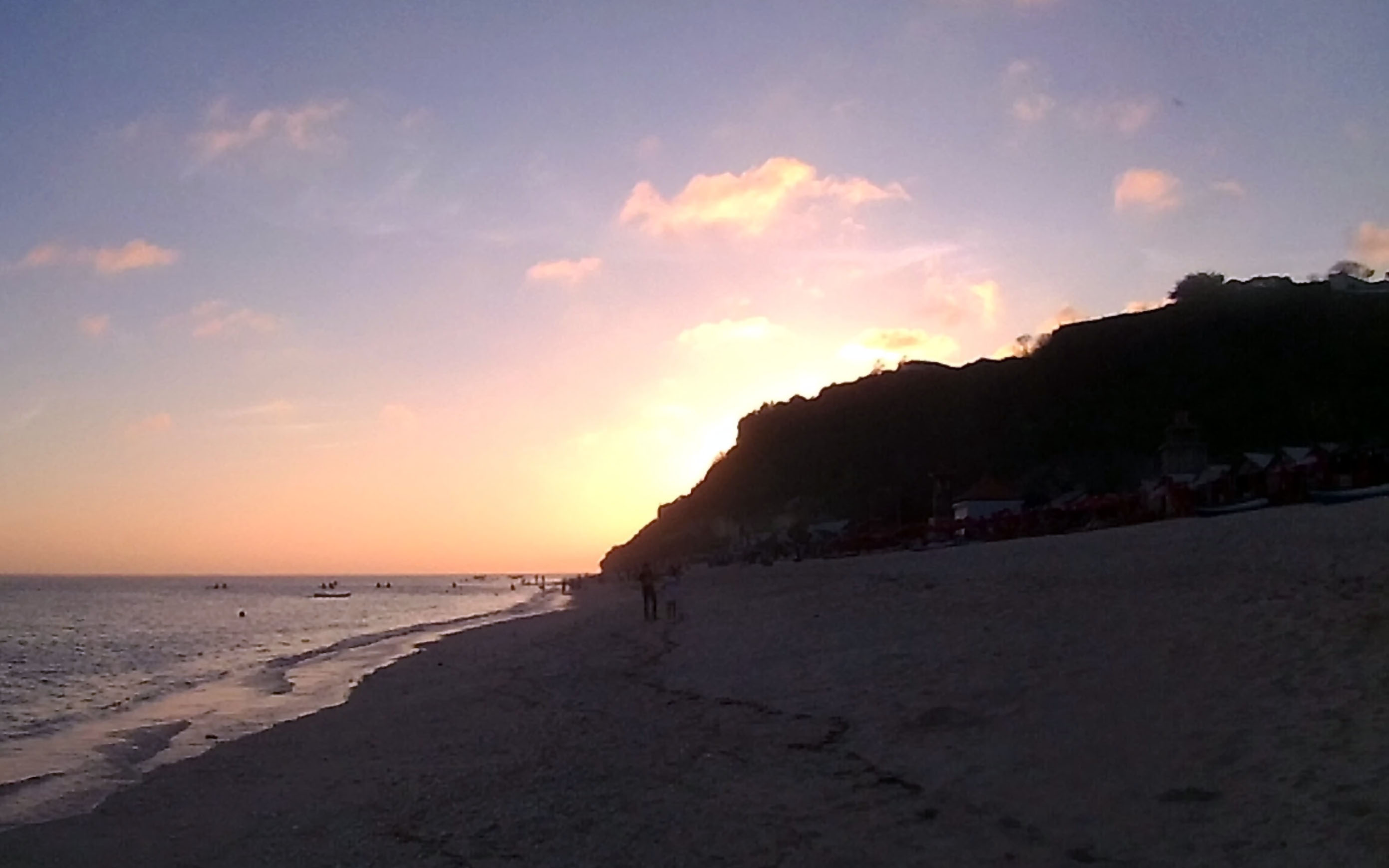
- Sunset at Pandawa Beach

- Coordinates: 8.845474°S 115.185014°E
- Location: South Kuta, Badung Regency, Bali, Indonesia

Dimensions
  - Length: + 1 km
- Access: Road

Pandawa Beach (or Pandava Beach, Indonesian: Pantai Pandawa; Balinese: ᬧᬲᬶᬄᬧᬵᬡ᭄ᬟᬯ, romanized: Pasih Pāṇḍawa) is located at Badung – South Kuta tourist region and one of the many beaches in Bali. In the past, this beach is well known to be one of the regions secret beaches because of the location behind a mountainous area that secluded its location to the unknown. Pandawa beach is surrounded by two cliffs with one of them, carved into the cliff face the statues of the Pandavas and the Kunti goddess. The six statues from top to bottom are Kunti, Yudhishthira, Bhima, Arjuna, Nakula, and Sahadeva.

The beach is well known as a tourist attraction and its water sport use but it is also known as a seaweed algaculture farm. It has a shallow long beach face that is suitable for farming seaweed by the locals. Water sports are also a favorite pass time for tourist at the beach. Surfing is not ideal at the beach although many other sports are known to be favored like beach volley, jet skiing, and paragliding from Timbis cliff to the beach.

Production houses and film studios often use the beach for filming TV serials and film for TV or FTV's.

== Ongoing Improvements ==
The increasing number of tourist to the beach pushed the local government to continually improve the facilities and road infrastructure to the beach. In the future they hope that Pandawa beach will become one of the best beaches in Bali following Kuta Beach and Sanur Beach.

== Photo Gallery ==
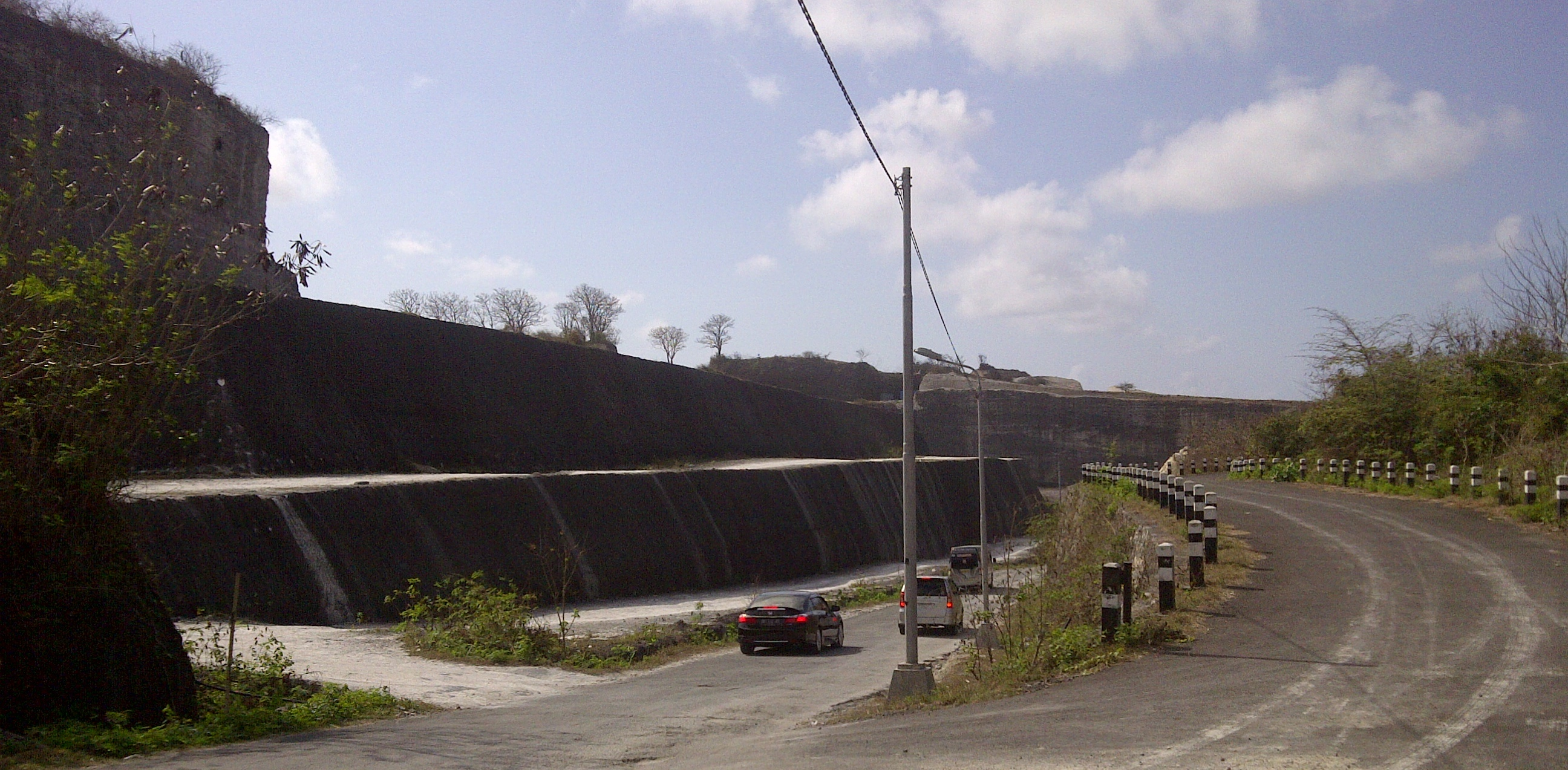
Road to Pandawa beach formerly a rock quarry.

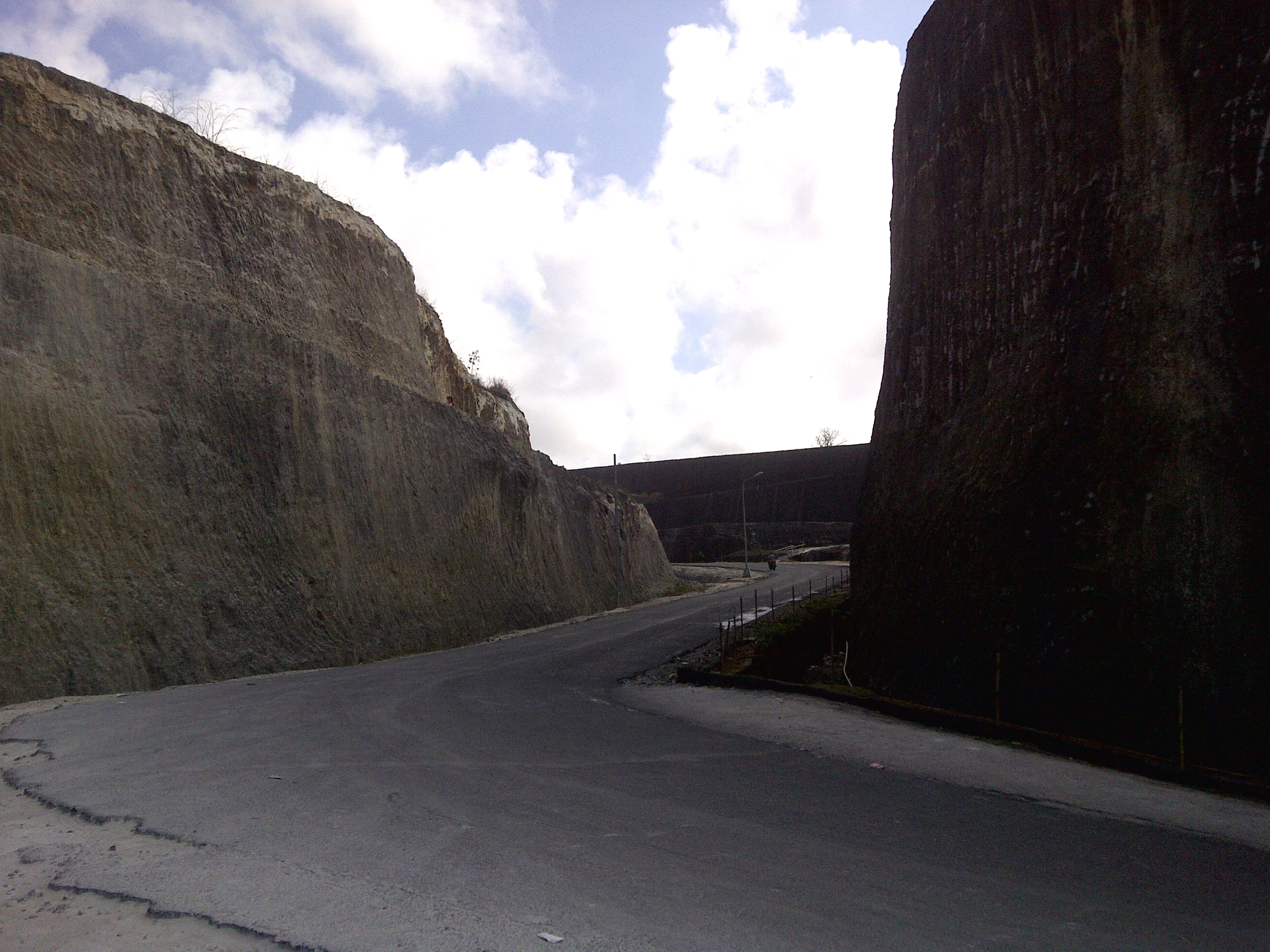
Entrance to the beach between two rock faces.

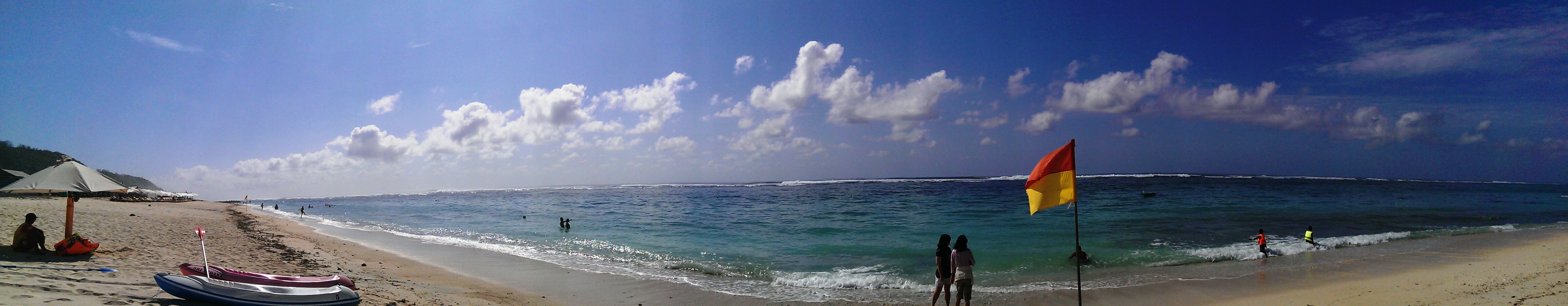
Panoramic view of the beach
