= Dalung, Kuta Utara =

Dalung
- village
- Location within Bali
- Coordinates: 8°37′03″S 115°10′16″E
- Country: Indonesia
- Province: Bali

Dalung is a Village in North Kuta District, Badung Regency of Bali, Indonesia.
