= I Wayan Adi Arnawa =

Indonesian politician

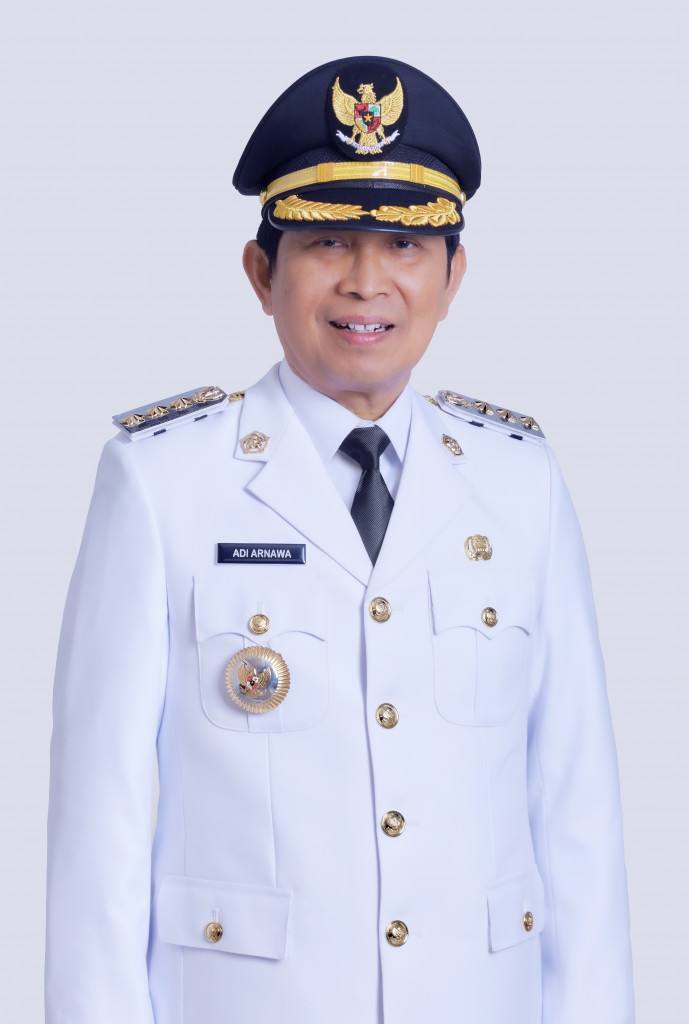
- 2025 portrait

Regent of Badung
- Incumbent
- Assumed office 20 February 2025
- Preceded by: I Nyoman Giri Prasta

Personal details
- Born: 9 March 1966 (age 60) Badung, Bali, Indonesia

I Wayan Adi Arnawa (born 9 March 1966) is an Indonesian politician of the Indonesian Democratic Party of Struggle and former bureaucrat who is the regent of Badung Regency, Bali, serving since February 2025.

== Early life ==
I Wayan Adi Arnawa was born on 9 March 1966 in Pecatu, South Kuta. He studied at an elementary school in Pecatu, and then at middle and high schools in Denpasar. Afterwards, he received his bachelor's degree from Udayana University.

== Career ==
He began working as a civil servant for Badung Regency in 1998, and joined the municipal government's legal department. In 2004, he was appointed as district head of North Kuta, and then became head of the municipal police unit of Badung in 2006. In 2011, he was head of the municipal revenue department, and in 2017 he was appointed regional secretary. He maintained this post until his resignation in 2024 to run in Badung's regency election.

In the election, Arnawa secured the endorsement of the Indonesian Democratic Party of Struggle (PDI-P) after he became a party member. He also secured further support from Demokrat and three parties without DPRD seats. As his running mate was I Bagus Alit Sucipta, a PDI-P member of the Bali Regional House of Representatives. Arnawa and Sucipta won the election with 221,802 votes (70.2%), defeating Wayan Suyasa–I Putu Alit Yandinata. They were sworn in on 20 February 2025.

As regent, Arnawa has pushed for boarding houses and villas (commonly used by foreign tourists in Bali) to be taxed as hotels in order to increase municipal revenues, in addition to pushing for the increase of tax registrations of local businesses. He also initiated a municipally funded English-language course for children, a scholarship program from the municipal government, and began construction of new roads in the Kuta area.

== Personal life ==
Arnawa has married twice, with Sapuh Ayu Dewi (divorced) and then with Ni Putu Rasniati. He has a daughter from his first marriage. His second wife Rasniati worked as a civil servant in Badung's municipal government.
