= North Kuta =

District in Badung Regency, Bali Province, Indonesia

Location of North Kuta in Badung

North Kuta (Indonesian: Kecamatan Kuta Utara) is an administrative district (kecamatan) in Badung Regency of Bali, Indonesia.

It lies just north of Kuta District and west of Denpasar city. It covers an area of 34.72 square kilometres, and had a population of 103,775 as of 2010 Census, having seen the heaviest brunt of suburbanization of all districts in the decade up to 2010 as the region was formerly mostly uninhabited fields. However the population then declined somewhat to 95,189 at the 2020 Census and to 90,769 by mid 2025.

It contains six desa/kelurahan (villages), listed below with their areas and their populations at the 2010 Census and 2020 Census, together with the official estimates as at mid 2025.

Name	Area in km^{2}	Pop'n 2010 Census	Pop'n 2020 Census	Pop'n mid 2025 Estimate
Kerobokan Kelod	7.79	16,804	11,119	11,108
Kerobokan	4.42	13,815	11,488	10,779
Kerobokan Kaja	3.38	21,414	20,765	18,612
Tibubeneng	6.85	14,366	12,876	12,452
Canggu	5.63	7,378	6,796	7,003
Dalung	6.65	30,228	32,145	28,439
Totals	34.72	103,775	95,189	90,769
