= Mangupura =

Town in Bali, Indonesia

- Town

Native transcription(s)
  - Balinese: ᬫᬗᬸᬧᬸᬭ
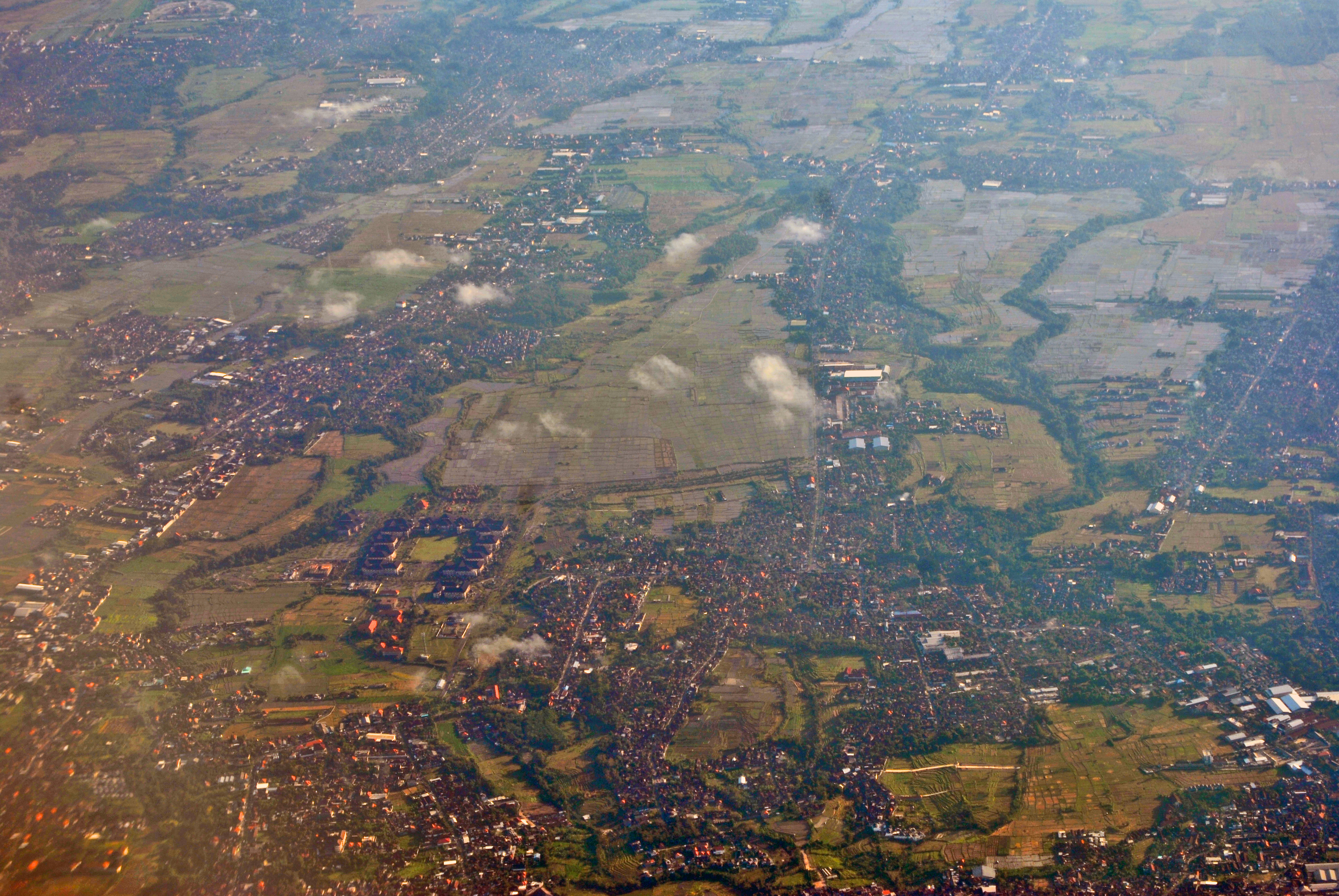
- Mangupura seen from the air

- Location in Badung Regency Location in Bali
- Coordinates: 8°36′10″S 115°10′43″E
- Country: Indonesia
- Province: Bali
- Regency: Badung Regency
- District: Mengwi District
- Metropolitan area: Sarbagita

Area
  - Total: 39,875 km^{2} (15,396 sq mi)

Population
  - Total: 73,092
- Time zone: UTC+8 (WITA)

Mangupura (Balinese: ᬫᬗᬸᬧᬸᬭ. pronounced [maŋuˈpura]) is the capital (regency seat) of the Badung Regency of Bali, Indonesia. The city has been the capital of Badung Regency since the enactment of Regulation Number 67, of 16 November 2009. Previously, the capital was located in Denpasar. Mangupura's population was 73,092.

Mangupura specifically developed as an urban area complete with the infrastructure and public service standards of urban areas. Mangupura region includes 9 towns in Mengwi.

== Etymology ==
The name Mangupura is a compound of two words, mangu (from Old Javanese mango, lango, langu, and langen, all of which mean the feeling of being captivated or allured by beauty or everything wonderful in general), and pura (from a Sanskrit word pur, which means a town, castle, or fortified city). Thus, the name Mangupura implies that it is a captivating city, a place to find beauty, peace and happiness, a city that brings prosperity to its people, and the capital that fosters a sense of security for the people.

== Administration ==
The Mangupura area includes 4 villages and 5 sub-districts (kelurahan) in the Mengwi district, namely:

1. Village Mengwi
2. Village Gulingan
3. Village Mengwitani
4. Village Kekeran
5. Village Kapal
6. Village Abianbase
7. Village Lukluk
8. Village Sempidi
9. Village Sading
