= Abiansemal District =

District in Badung Regency, Bali Province, Indonesia

Coordinates: 8.509705°S 115.209994°E

Location withn Badung Regency

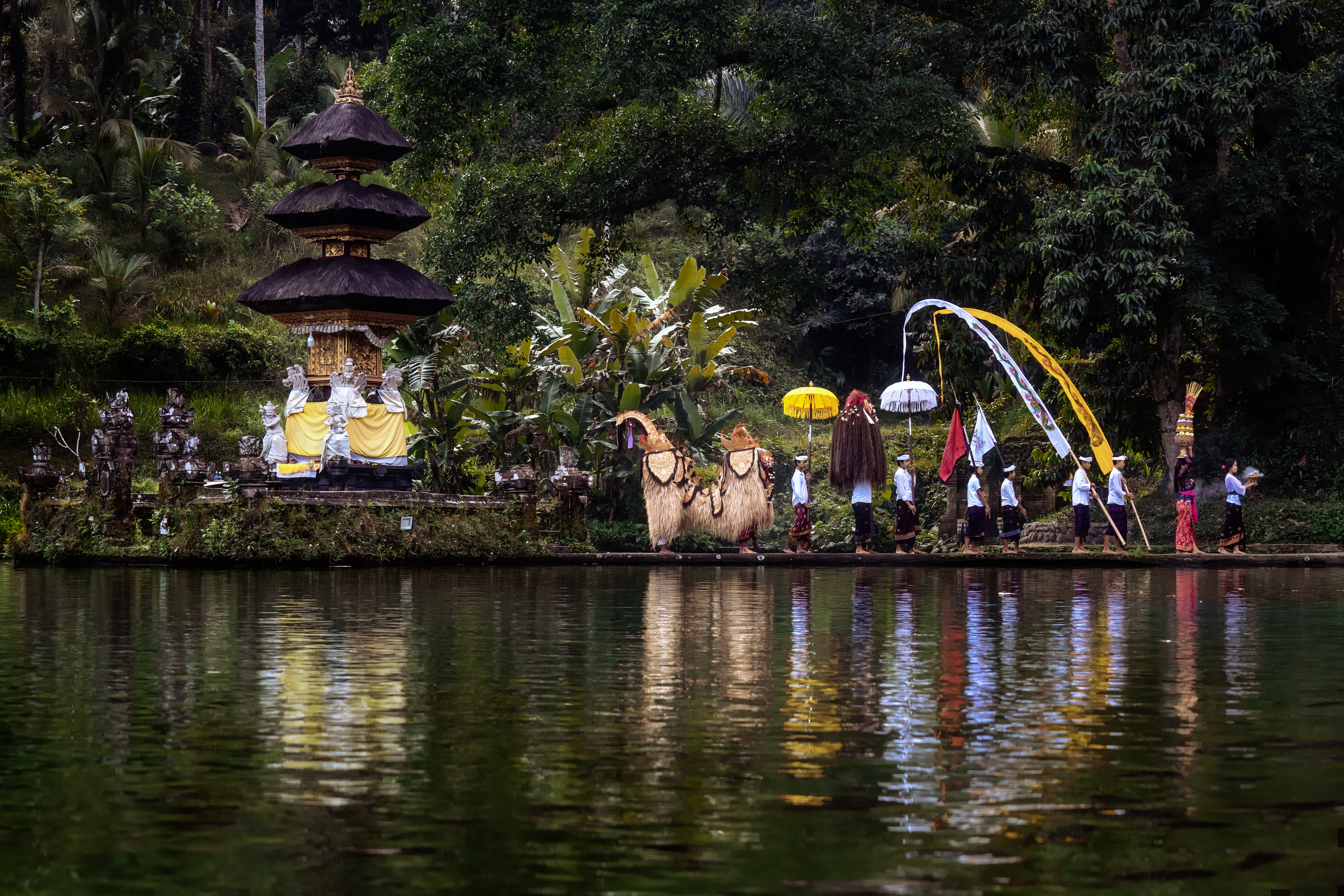
Mumbul park

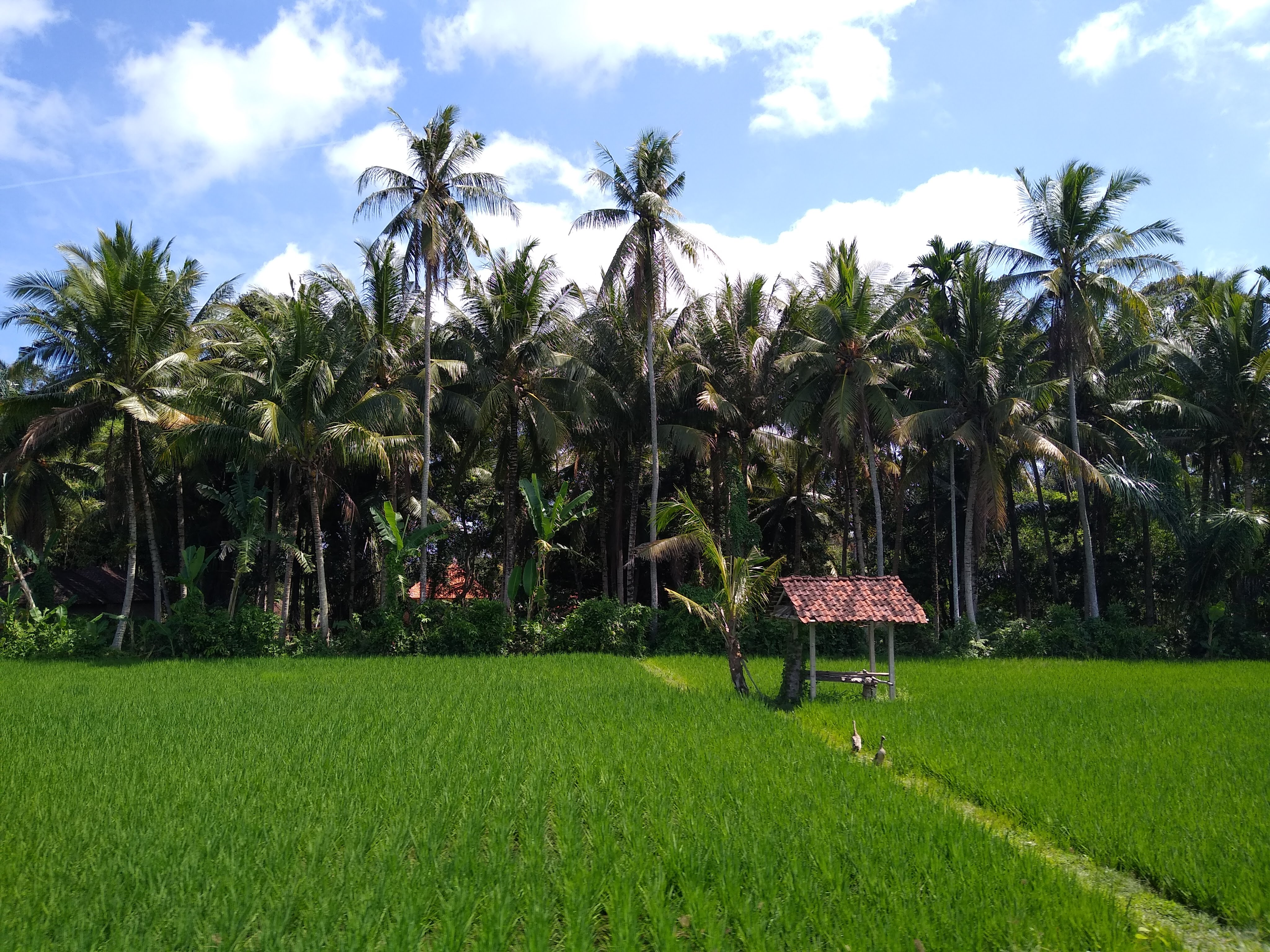
A rice field in Abiansemal District

Abiansemal is a district (kecamatan) in the Badung Regency of Bali, Indonesia. It covers an area of 69.01 km^{2}, and had a population of 88,144 at the 2010 Census and 98,904 at the 2020 Census. The capital of the district is Abiansemal.
