= Petang =

- District
- Location in Badung Regency
- Country: Indonesia
- Province: Bali
- Regency: Badung

Area
  - Total: 115.00 km^{2} (44.40 sq mi)

Population (2020)
  - Total: 31,013
  - Density: 269.68/km^{2} (698.46/sq mi)
- Time zone: UTC+08:00 (Indonesia Central Standard Time)
- Postal Code: 80353

Petang (Balinese: ᬧᭂᬢᬂ) is a district (kecamatan) in Badung Regency, Bali, Indonesia.
