= Legian =

Suburban and beach area on Bali, Indonesia

Coordinates: 8°42′02″S 115°09′54″E

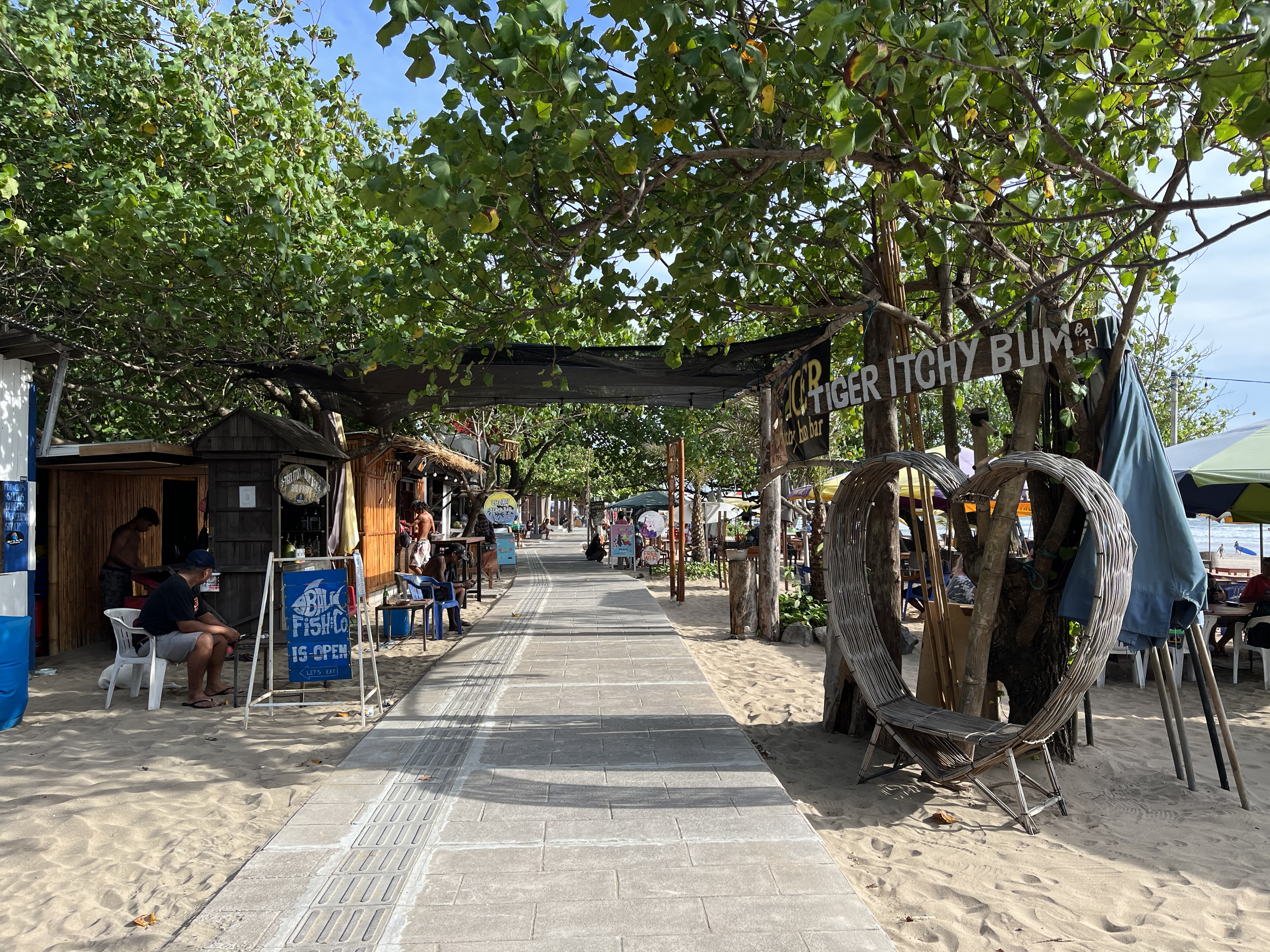
Legian Beach

Legian (Balinese script: ᬍᬕᬶᬬᬦ᭄) is a suburban and beach area on the west coast of Bali in Indonesia, just north of Kuta and south of Seminyak, the area between Jl. Melasti and Jl. Dhyana Pura. Administratively it is a subdistrict of Kuta District within Badung Regency.
