= Abiansemal =

Village in Badung Regency, Bali, Indonesia

Abiansemal ᬅᬩᬶᬬᬦ᭄ᬲᭂᬫᬮ᭄
- Village
- Location within Bali
- Coordinates: 8.527078°S 115.211896°E
- Country: Indonesia
- Province: Bali
- Regency: Badung
- District: Abiansemal

Government
  - camat: Ida Bagus Bhisma Wiratma S.H.

Area
  - Total: 4.089 km^{2} (1.579 sq mi)

Population (2010)
  - Total: 7,508
  - Density: 1,836/km^{2} (4,756/sq mi)
- Postal code: 80352
- Website: desaabiansemal.wordpress.com

Abiansemal is a village (desa) and capital of Abiansemal District in the Badung Regency of Bali, Indonesia. As of 2016, the population was estimated at 7,215.
