= Badung Regency =

Regency in Bali, Indonesia

Badung Regency Kabupaten Badung
- Regency

Native transcription(s)
  - Balinese: ᬓᬪᬹᬧᬢᬾᬦ᭄ ᬩᬤᬸᬂ Kabupatén Badung
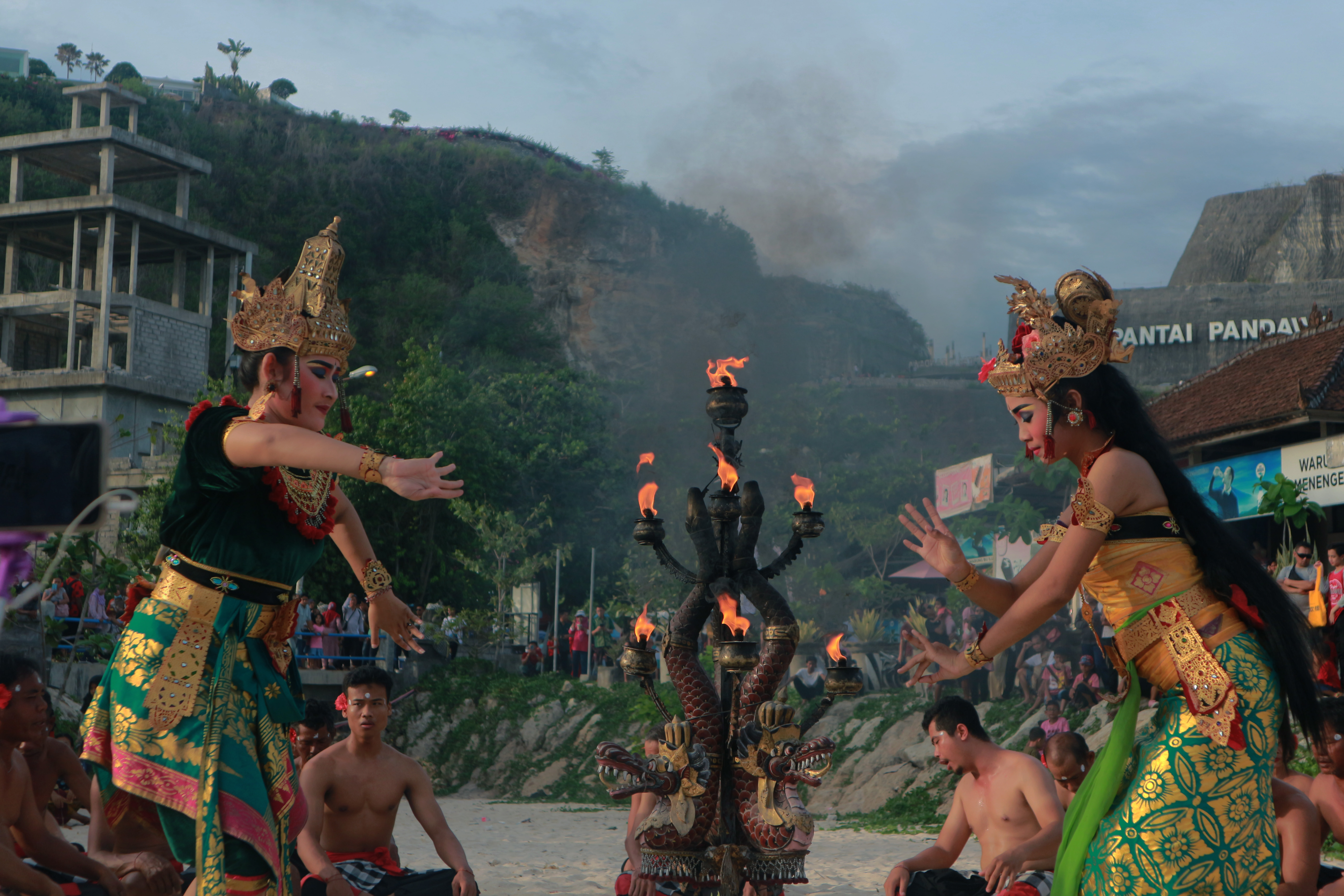
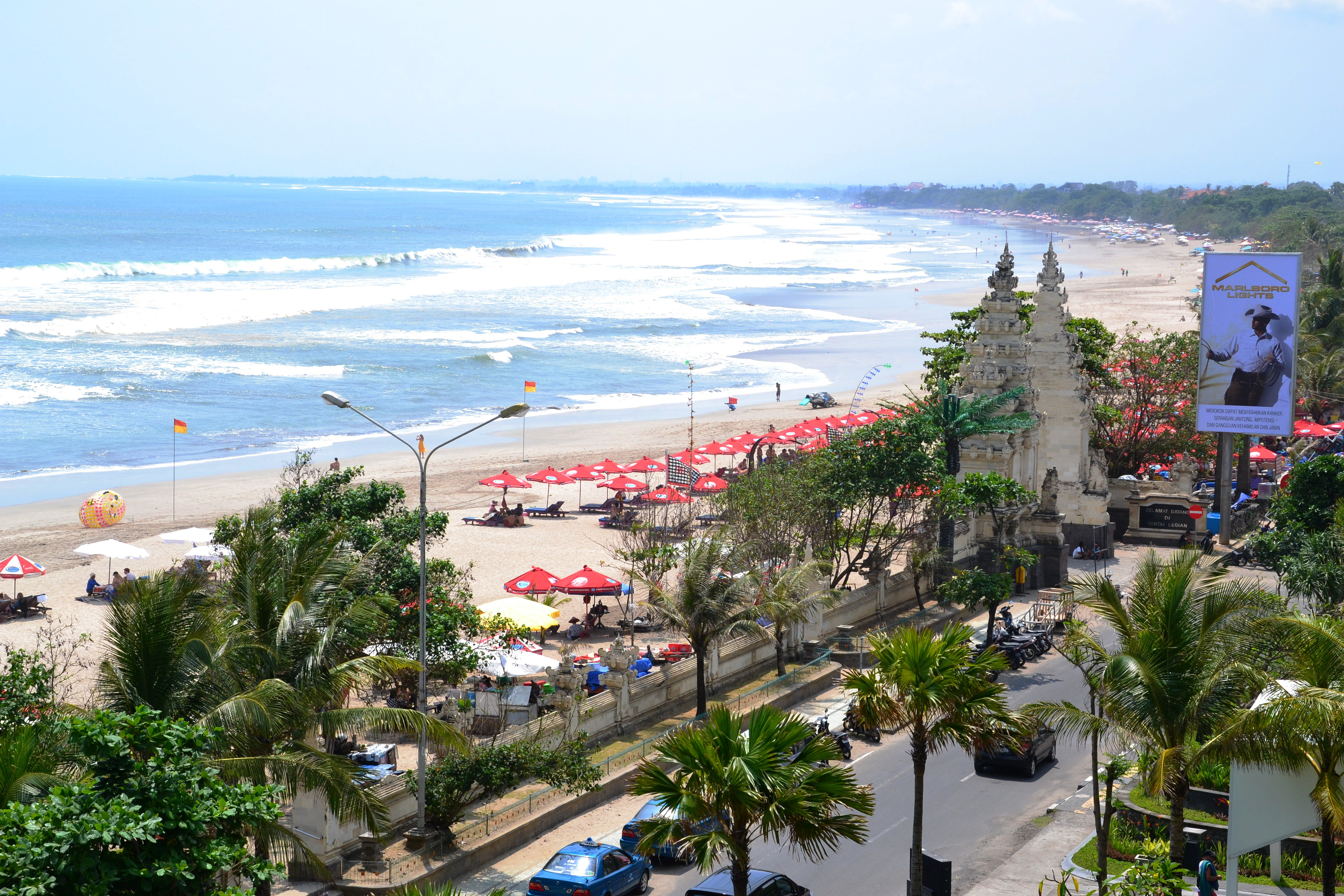
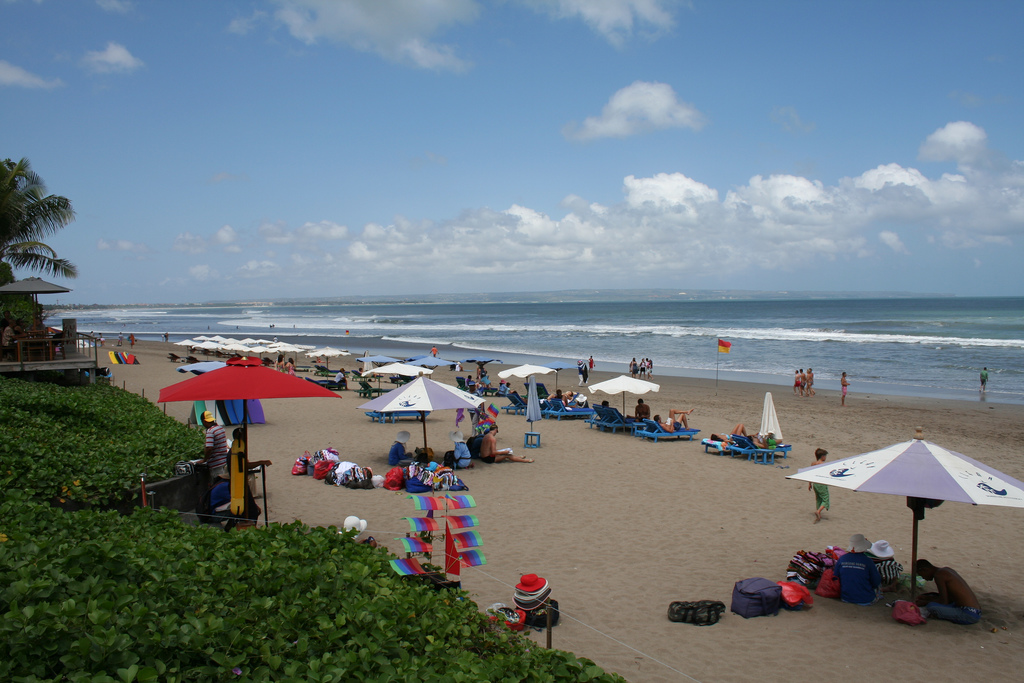
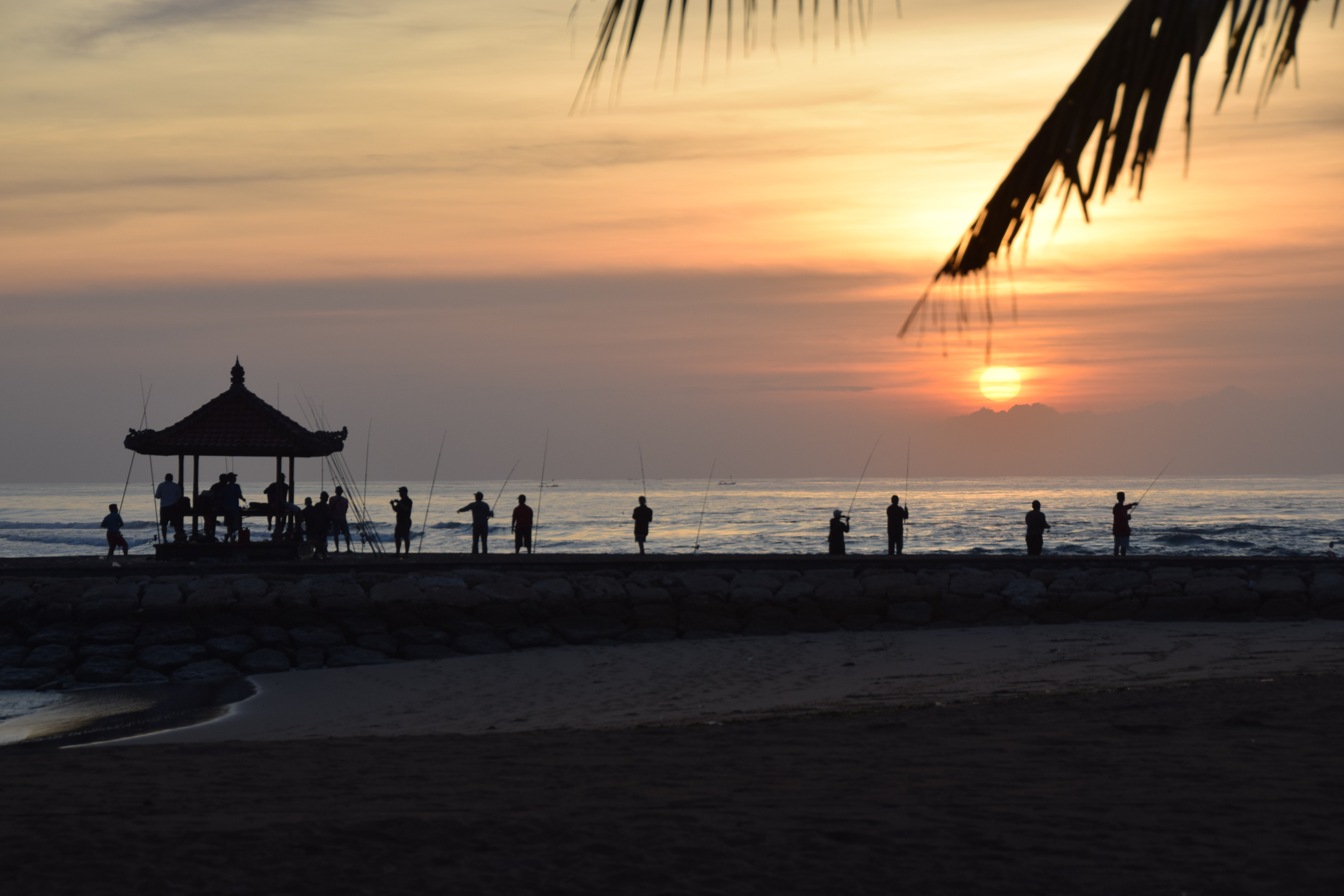
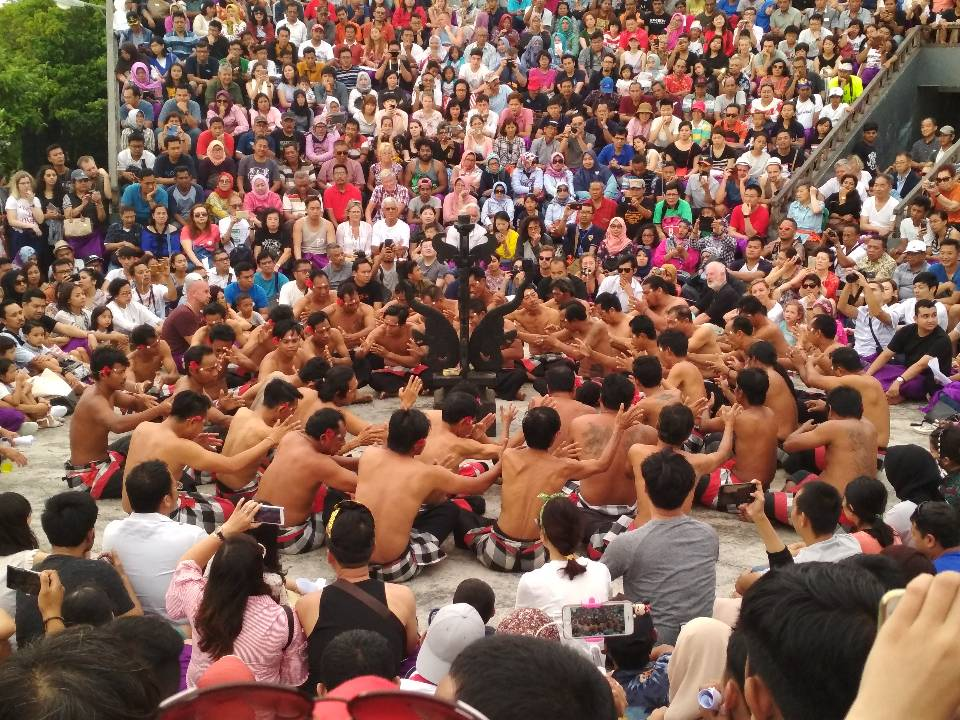
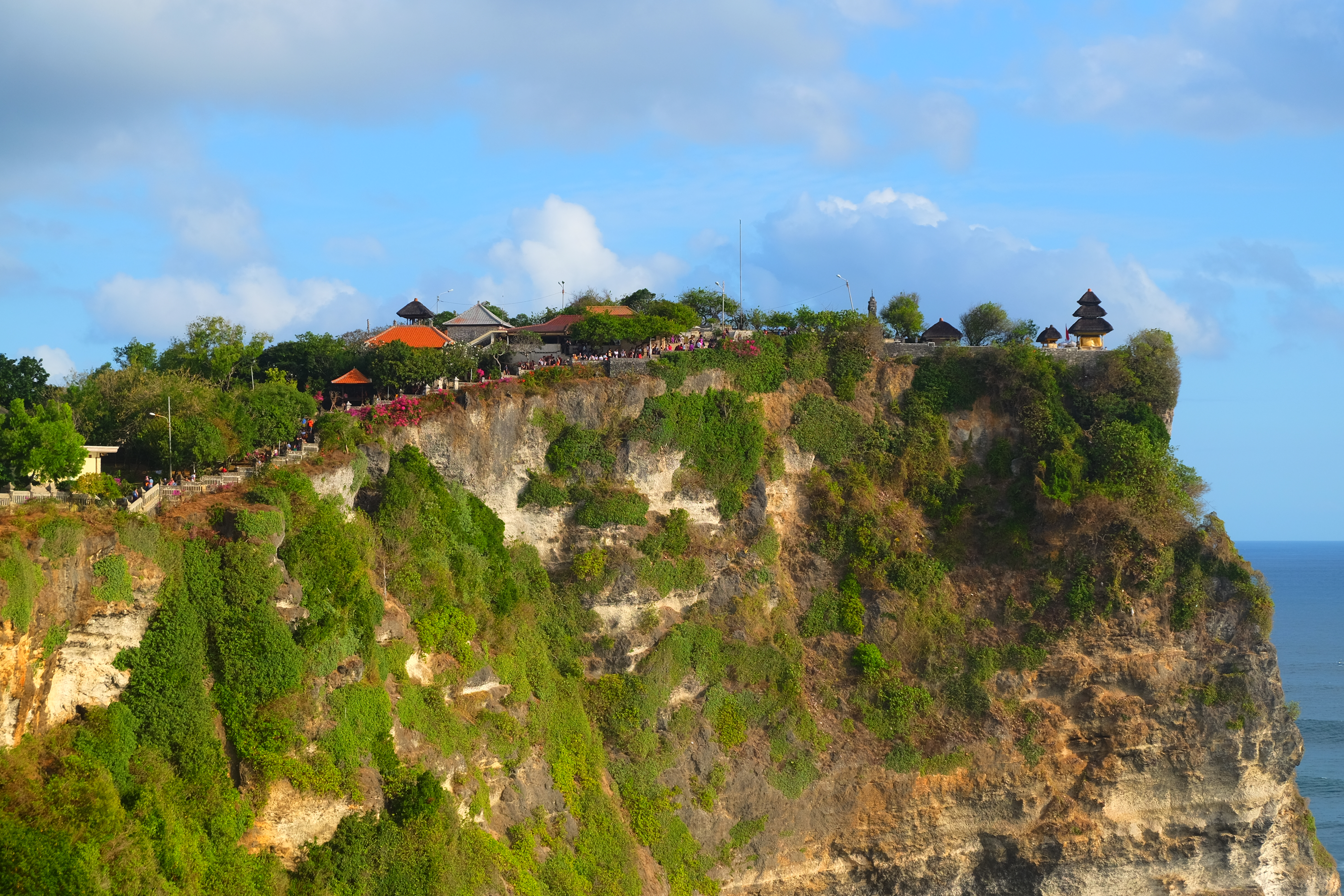
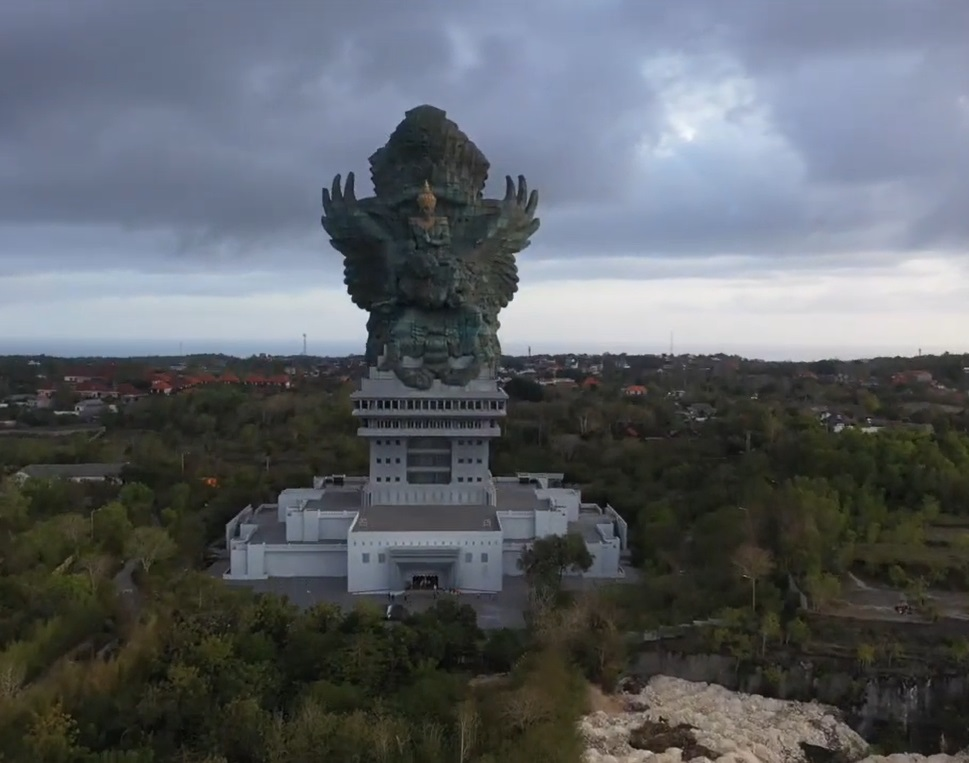
- Kecak dancers in Pandawa Beach Kuta Beach Seminyak Beach Nusa Dua Kecak dancers at Uluwatu Uluwatu Temple Garuda Wisnu Kencana statue

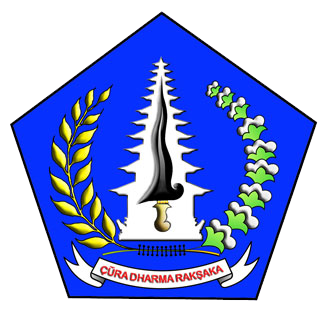
- Coat of arms
- Nicknames: Gumi Keris ('Land of Keris'), Hawaii Van Bally
- Motto: Çūra Dharma Rakṣaka (Sanskrit) ᬘᬹᬭᬟᬃᬫᬭᬓ᭄ᬱᬓ "The Government is Obliged to Protect the Truth and the People"
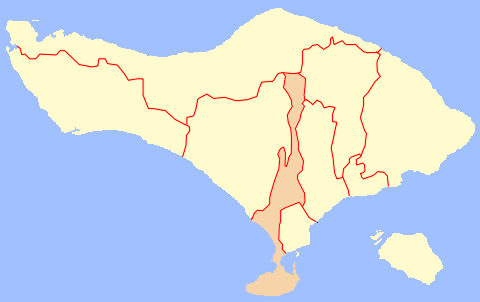
- Location within Bali

- Location in Bali Location in Lesser Sunda Islands Location in Indonesia Location in Southeast Asia Location in Asia
- Coordinates: 8°35′0″S 115°11′0″E
- Country: Indonesia
- Region: Lesser Sunda Islands
- Province: Bali
- Metropolitan area: Sarbagita
- Districts: List: South Kuta; Kuta; North Kuta; Mengwi; Abiansemal; Petang
- Established: 14 August 1958
- Capital: Mangupura

Government
  - Body: Badung Regency Government
  - Regent: I Wayan Adi Arnawa (PDI-P)
  - Vice Regent: Bagus Alit Sucipta
  - Legislature: Badung Regency Regional House of Representatives (DPRD)

Area
  - Total: 398.75 km^{2} (153.96 sq mi)

Population (mid 2025 estimate)
  - Total: 539,718
  - Density: 1,353.5/km^{2} (3,505.6/sq mi)

Demographics
  - Ethnic groups (2010): 78.40% Balinese; 15.13% Javanese; 0.60% Sasak; 0.51% Sundanese; 0.33% Flores; 0.28% Chinese; 0.20% Bugis; 0.12% Malays; 3.12% other
  - Religion (2024): 81.96% Hinduism; 11.01% Islam; 6.24% Christianity; 3.92% Protestanism; 2.32% Catholicism; 0.78% Buddhism; 0.01% Confucianism
  - Languages and dialects: Indonesian (official); Balinese (native); Lowland Balinese; Badung Balinese; Highland Balinese (northern regions) other
- Time zone: UTC+8 (ICST)
- Area code: (+62) 361
- ISO 3166 code: ID-BA (Bali)
- Vehicle registration: DK
- HDI (2024): ▲0.831 (2th) – very high
- Website: badungkab.go.id

Badung Regency (Indonesian: Kabupaten Badung; Balinese: ᬓᬪᬹᬧᬢᬾᬦ᭄ ᬩᬤᬸᬂ) is a regency (kabupaten) of the province of Bali, Indonesia. Its regency seat is in the upland town of Mangupura. It covers districts to the west of the provincial capital of Denpasar, and it has a land area of 398.75 km^{2}. It is bordered by Tabanan Regency to its west, Denpasar City, Gianyar Regency and Bangli Regency to its east and Buleleng Regency to its north, and the Indian Ocean to its south.

The regency had a population of 543,332 at the 2010 Census and 548,191 at the 2020 Census; the official estimate as of mid-2025 was 539,718. It had undergone a population boom in recent decades (although not subsequent to 2010), and had grown into the largest of the suburban regions of Greater Denpasar (Sarbagita). It covers Bali's most heavily populated tourist regions, including Kuta, Legian, Seminyak, Jimbaran, Nusa Dua, Canggu, Uluwatu, Badung, and Mengwi. The northern part of the regency is relatively unpopulated, but the part near the coast and west of Denpasar from Jimbaran and up to Canggu is heavily populated. Ngurah Rai International Airport is located within the Regency.

== History ==
=== Establishment of the Badung Kingdom ===
In 1343 Majapahit came to power in Bali and was centered in Samprangan with its ruler, Dalem Sri Aji Kresna Kepakisan, who had a crown prince named I Dewa Anom Pemayun, which later, due to an incident, was renamed Sira Arya Benculuk Tegeh Kori by Dalem. According to folklore, Sira Arya Benculuk Tegeh Kori made a long journey to Ulun Danu Batur Temple and asked Ida Betari Ulun Danu Batur to be given "panugrahan" (blessing/wisdom) so that he would later become someone of authority and be respected by the people. its people. Sira Arya Benculuk Tegeh Kori's prayer was answered by Ida Betari Batur, and asked Sira Arya Benculuk Tegeh Kori to leave to the southwest (Gumi Badeng) precisely in Tonjaya, an area occupied by Ki Bendesa with his brothers Ki Pasek Kabayan, Ki Ngukuhin, and Ki Tangkas. On the initiative of Ki Bendesa and his brothers, it was decided through deliberation that Sira Arya Benculuk Tegeh Kori was appointed ruler of the area.

At the end of the 18th century the power of Puri Ksatriya fell to Kyayi Ngurah Made, as recipient of the throne from Kyayi Ngurah Jambe Ksatriya. Because Puri Ksatriya has been damaged due to the war for power. During his reign, Kyayi Ngurah Made ordered the construction of a new castle located in Tetaman Den-Pasar. > ('den-pasar' in Balinese means "north of the market"), which is to the south of the ruins of Puri Ksatriya. In 1788, Puri Agung Denpasar was officially used as the center of government for the Badung Kingdom and Kyayi Ngurah Made as King of Badung I used the title "I Gusti Ngurah Made Pemecutan", considering that he was a descendant of the Pemecutan Dynasty (1788–1813).

=== Conquest of Badung by the Dutch ===
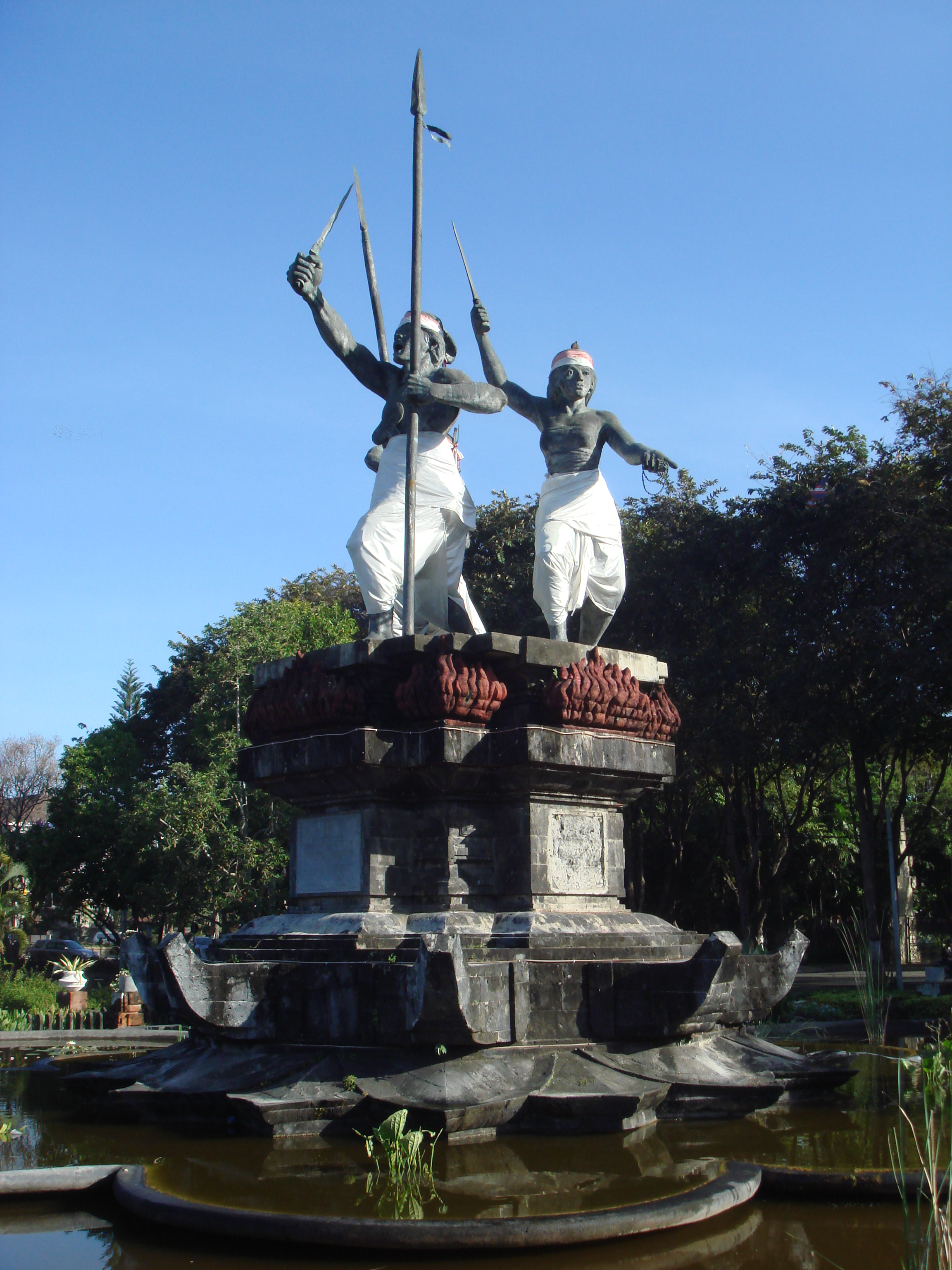
Puputan Badung monument in the city of Denpasar.

In 1826 the Netherlands was permitted by King I Gusti Made Ngurah to establish his station in Kuta, in return for this cooperation the king received a very beautiful gift. A Danish trader named Mads Johansen Lange who came to Bali at the age of 18 played a role as a mediator between the Dutch East Indies Government and Badung and other kingdoms in Bali. From then on, Mads Lange, who was born in 1806, was able to improve good relations with the kings in Bali. In 1856 Mads Lange was sick and asked to retire and decided to return to Denmark, but unfortunately he died when the ship he was on was leaving, and he was finally buried in Kuta.

In 1904 a Dutch-flagged merchant ship belonging to a Chinese from Banjarmasin named "Sri Komala" ran aground on Sanur Beach. The ship owner and the Dutch East Indies government accused the local community of stripping, destroying and seizing the contents of the ship and sued the kings of Badung for all the damage in the amount of 3,000 dollars silver and punish those who damaged the ship. The king's rejection of the accusations and payment of compensation, caused the Dutch East Indies government to prepare military expedition to Bali on 20 September 1906. Three infantry battalions and 2 artillery battalions immediately landed and attacked the Badung Kingdom.

After attacking Badung the Dutch invaded the city of Denpasar. The Dutch reached the city gate without encountering significant resistance, but suddenly they were greeted by a group of people dressed all in white, ready to carry out "war puputan" (fighting to death until the last drop of blood). Led by King I Gusti Ngurah Made Agung and the priests, bodyguards, relatives, men and women decorated themselves with gemstones and dressed in battle clothes went out into the middle of the battlefield. This was done because in Hinduism the goal of a warrior is to die on the battlefield so that his soul can go straight to heaven. Surrendering and dying in exile is the most humiliating thing. It was reported that before the puputan occurred, the crown prince of I Gusti Ngurah Made Agung named I Gusti Alit Ngurah, who was already 10 years old, was first rushed by several special soldiers of the royal guard, accompanied by his mother and several close family members of the castle, to the western area, precisely at Seminyak Village, Kuta. On 17 January 1907, I Gusti Alit Ngurah was captured and became a prisoner of war, and exiled to Mataram, Lombok, by the Dutch East Indies government.

After experiencing exile for approximately ten years, on 1 October 1917, at the urging of community leaders in Lombok such as I Gusti Putu Griya and Ida Pedanda Ketut Kelingan, as well as the pressure of the people of Badung, I Gusti Alit Ngurah was finally returned by the Dutch East Indies government to Denpasar, apart from that because security in Bali was relatively safe and there were no signs of a rebellion.

=== Dutch Occupation Period ===
In 1929, after the reconstruction of Puri Agung Denpasar which was destroyed during puputan, I Gusti Alit Ngurah was appointed by the Dutch Indies as Regent of Badung with the title Cokorda Alit Ngurah. The Dutch East Indies government began to implement a new system of government, namely Zelfbestuur (swapraja government ]) to make it easier to regulate such a large colonial area on 1 July 1938, and this system was implemented simultaneously throughout the entire region of Bali which was divided into 8 landschapen, namely Buleleng, Jembrana, Tabanan, Badung, Gianyar, Bangli, Klungkung and Karangasem. At each landschapen a regional head is appointed with the title Zelbestuurder (King).

The election of regional heads is still predominantly based on the descendants of the king or from the previous king's family. In connection with this, for Zelbestuur Badung power is held by I Gusti Alit Ngurah from Puri Agung Denpasar with the title Cokorda Alit Ngurah. His inauguration and appointment (abhiseka) was carried out simultaneously with 8 other kings at Besakih Temple, Karangasem on 30 June 1938. This inauguration and appointment was carried out by Resident L.J.J. Caron. The rulers of the self-swapraja (Zelfbestuur) were members of the federation of kings which called Paruman Agung.

=== Japanese occupation period ===
After several battles, the Japan army landed on Sanur Beach on 18 and 19 February 1942. From the direction of Sanur, the Japanese army entered the city of Denpasar without experiencing any resistance. Then, from Denpasar, Japan controlled all of Bali. First of all, what laid the foundations of Japanese power in Bali were the Japanese Army troops (Rikugun). Then, when the situation stabilized, control of the government was handed over to the civil government. When the Japanese entered Bali, Paruman Agung or the council of Balinese kings was changed to Sutyo Renmei.

=== Period of Indonesian Independence ===
In 1945 after the surrender of the Japan and the independence of the Republic of Indonesia, Bali became part of the Government of State of East Indonesia. The State of East Indonesia was dissolved and all of its territory was merged into the Republic of Indonesia on 17 August 1950. The self-swapraja (kingdom) government in Bali was changed to the Council of Kings with its seat in Denpasar and chaired by a king. In October 1950, the Badung Swapraja government took the form of the Badung Government Council which was chaired by the chairman of the Daily Government Council which was held by the Head of Swapraja (Raja) and assisted by members of the Daily Government Council.

Based on Law no. 69 of 1958 starting from 1 December 1958, the autonomous regions in Bali were changed to Level II Regions at the level of regency, including Badung. Denpasar became the capital of the regional government of Badung Regency, then based on the Decree of the Minister of Home Affairs Number Des.52/2/36-136 dated 23 June 1960, Denpasar was also designated as the capital of Bali Province which was originally domiciled in Singaraja.

Then based on Government Regulation Number 20 of 1978, Denpasar officially became an administrative city, and in line with the ability and potential of its region in implementing regional autonomy, on 15 January 1992, based on Law Number 1 of 1992, and Denpasar's status was upgraded to municipality, which was then inaugurated by the Minister of Home Affairs on 27 February 1992.

== Geography ==
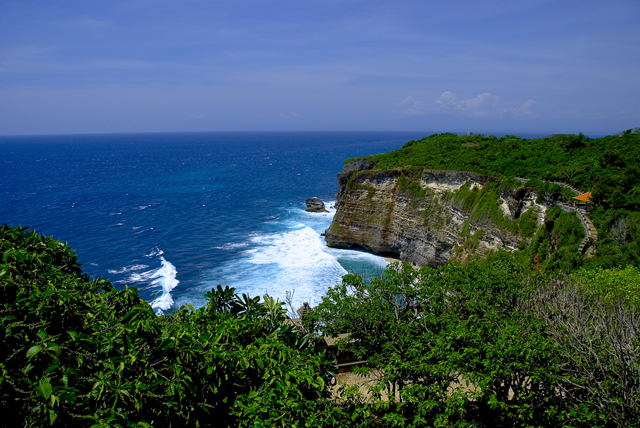
Pura Luhur at Uluwatu

Badung Regency is one of the regencies in Bali Province. This regency is located stretching from the center to the south of Bali Island. Astronomically, the Badung Regency area is located between 8°14' to 8°50' South Latitude and 115°5' to 115°14' East Longitude. Badung Regency has an area of 398.75 km^{2} (153.96 sq mi) which is divided into six administrative districts (kecamatan) with the largest district being Petang District with an area of 92.2 km^{2} (35.6 sq mi) and the smallest district being Kuta District with an area of 22.19 km^{2} (8.57 sq mi).

=== Borders ===
Administratively, Badung Regency borders several regencies/cities in Bali, namely:

=== Western ===
- Tabanan Regency

=== Eastern ===
- Denpasar City
- Gianyar Regency
- Bangli Regency

=== Northern ===
- Buleleng Regency

=== Southern ===
- Indian Ocean

=== Topography ===
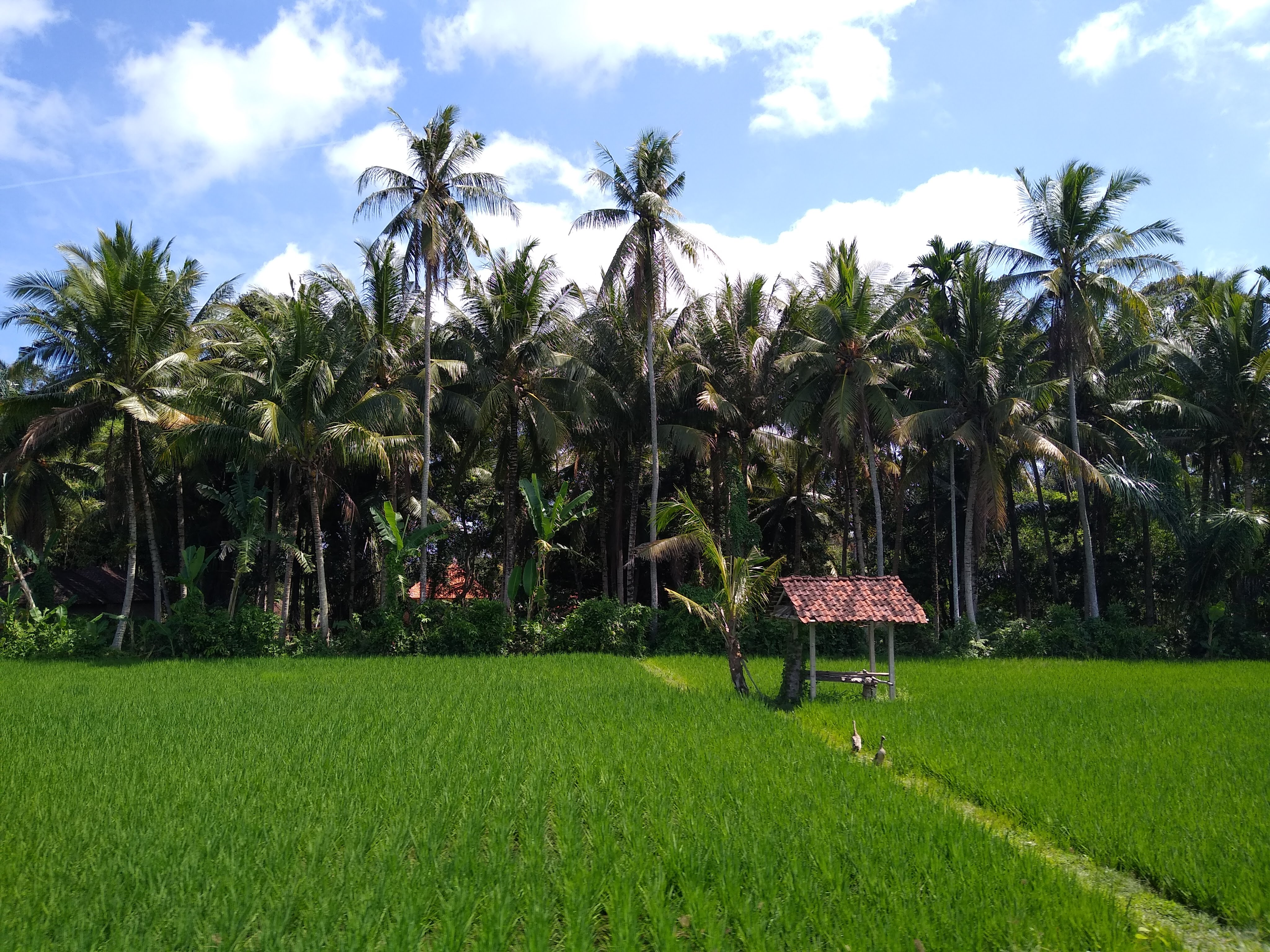
A rice field in Abiansemal

Topographically, Badung Regency has a variety of land surface contours. In the southern region, the dominant land surface contour is the lowlands to the coastal areas. Meanwhile, the central region is dominated by lowlands which are then followed by the land surface contours of hills and mountains in the northern region. The height of the land surface in Badung Regency varies between 0 and ±2000 meters above sea level. Based on its altitude, the districts of South Kuta, North Kuta, and Kuta are at an altitude of 0–65 meters above sea level, the Mengwi district is at an altitude of 0–350 meters above sea level, the Abiansemal district is at an altitude of 75–350 meters above sea level, and the Petang district is at an altitude of between 250 and 2075 meters above sea level.

=== Climate ===
Like other regions in southern Indonesia, Badung Regency has a tropical climate of the tropical monsoon climate type (Am) with two distinct seasons, namely the rainy season and the dry season. The rainy season in the Badung region occurs due to the blowing of the westerly monsoon winds which are wet, humid, and carry a lot of water vapor that produces rain clouds and the rainy season usually occurs between November to April with its peak usually occurring between January or February. Meanwhile, the dry season in the Badung region lasts from May to October which is caused by the blowing of the dry and cold easterly monsoon winds. The air temperature in the Badung region varies based on the height of the land surface. However, in general the air temperature in the Badung region ranges from 22°–34 °C, except for the hilly and mountainous areas where the average temperature is generally less than 26 °C. The relative humidity level in the Badung region usually ranges from 50%–90%.

Climate data for Badung Regency (Ngurah Rai Intl.)
Month	Jan	Feb	Mar	Apr	May	Jun	Jul	Aug	Sep	Oct	Nov	Dec	Year
Record high °C (°F)	34.2 (93.6)	34.5 (94.1)	34.7 (94.5)	34.6 (94.3)	34.1 (93.4)	33.6 (92.5)	33.2 (91.8)	33.4 (92.1)	34.0 (93.2)	34.6 (94.3)	34.3 (93.7)	34.1 (93.4)	34.7 (94.5)
Mean daily maximum °C (°F)	31.5 (88.7)	31.5 (88.7)	31.9 (89.4)	32.2 (90.0)	31.8 (89.2)	30.9 (87.6)	30.4 (86.7)	30.4 (86.7)	31.2 (88.2)	31.9 (89.4)	31.8 (89.2)	31.5 (88.7)	31.5 (88.7)
Daily mean °C (°F)	27.2 (81.0)	27.1 (80.8)	27.4 (81.3)	27.6 (81.7)	27.4 (81.3)	26.7 (80.1)	26.2 (79.2)	26.2 (79.2)	26.8 (80.2)	27.3 (81.1)	27.2 (81.0)	27.1 (80.8)	27.0 (80.6)
Mean daily minimum °C (°F)	23.6 (74.5)	23.5 (74.3)	23.7 (74.7)	24.0 (75.2)	23.7 (74.7)	23.0 (73.4)	22.6 (72.7)	22.5 (72.5)	22.9 (73.2)	23.5 (74.3)	23.4 (74.1)	23.5 (74.3)	23.4 (74.1)
Record low °C (°F)	20.0 (68.0)	20.3 (68.5)	20.6 (69.1)	21.1 (70.0)	20.9 (69.6)	20.4 (68.7)	19.7 (67.5)	19.5 (67.1)	19.9 (67.8)	20.5 (68.9)	20.4 (68.7)	20.1 (68.2)	19.5 (67.1)
Average precipitation mm (inches)	345 (13.6)	296 (11.7)	240 (9.4)	136 (5.4)	90 (3.5)	68 (2.7)	60 (2.4)	40 (1.6)	52 (2.0)	120 (4.7)	220 (8.7)	310 (12.2)	1,977 (77.8)
Average precipitation days (≥ 4)	20	18	20	13	10	7	6	4	5	10	16	19	148
Source: Climate-Data.org

== Government and politics ==
No.	Regent	Start of Term	End of Term	Vice Regent
10	I Wayan Adi Arnawa	26 February 2025	Incumbent	Bagus Alit Sucipta

=== Parliament ===
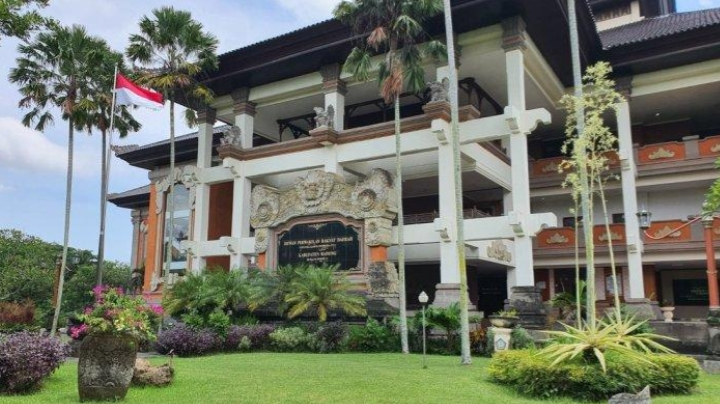
Badung's parliament (DPRD) building

=== Administrative districts ===
The Regency is divided into six districts (kecamatan), listed below from south to north with their areas and their populations at the 2010 Census and the 2020 Census, together with the official estimates as of mid-2025. The table also includes the locations of the district administrative centres, the numbers of administrative villages in each district (totaling 16 urban kelurahan and 46 rural desa), and its post codes.

Kode Wilayah	Name of District (kecamatan)	Area in km^{2}	Pop'n 2010 Census	Pop'n 2020 Census	Pop'n mid 2025 Estimate	Admin centre	No. of villages	Post code
51.03.05	South Kuta (Kuta Selatan)	101.45	115,918	131,139	123,540	Jimbaran	6 ^{(a)}	80362
51.03.01	Kuta	22.19	86,483	59,160	58,060	Kuta	5 ^{(b)}	80361
51.03.06	North Kuta (Kuta Utara)	34.72	103,715	95,189	90,270	Kerobokan	6 ^{(c)}	80363
51.03.02	Mengwi	81.82	122,829	132,786	134,198	Mengwi	20 ^{(d)}	80351
51.03.03	Abiansemal	66.36	88,144	98,904	100,410	Blahkiuh	18	80352
51.03.04	Petang	92.20	26,243	31,013	33,240	Petang	7	80353
	Totals	398.75	543,332	548,191	539,518		62	

Notes: (a) comprising three kelurahan (Benoa, Tanjung Benoa and Jimbaran) and three desa. (b) all five are kelurahan (Kedonganan, Tuban, Kuta, Legian and Seminyak).
(c) comprising three kelurahan (Kerobokan Kelod, Kerobokan and Kerobokan Kaja) and three desa. (d) comprising five kelurahan (Abianbase, Kapal, Lukluk, Sading and Sempidi) and 15 desa.

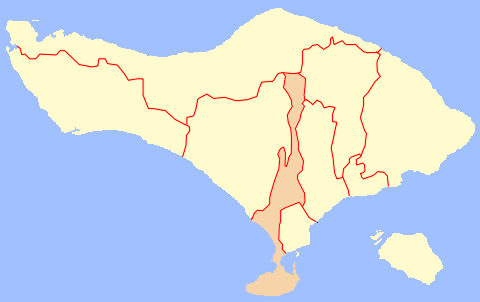
Map of Badung Regency in Bali

Map of districts in Badung Regency

List of districts and villages in Badung Regency as follows:

Code	Districts	Urban villages	Rural villages	Status	List
51.03.03	Abiansemal	-	18	Rural villages	Abiansemal; Angantaka; Ayunan; Blahkiuh; Bongkasa; Bongkasa Pertiwi; Darmasaba; Dauh Yeh Cani; Jagapati; Mambal; Mekar Bhuana; Punggul; Sangeh; Sedang; Selat; Sibang Gede; Sibang Kaja; Taman
51.03.01	Kuta	5	-	Urban villages	Kedonganan; Tuban; Kuta; Legian; Seminyak
51.03.05	South Kuta	3	3	Rural villages	Pecatu; Ungasan; Kutuh
51.03.05	South Kuta	3	3	Urban villages	Benoa; Tanjung Benoa; Jimbaran
51.03.06	North Kuta	3	3	Rural villages	Canggu; Dalung; Tibubeneng
51.03.06	North Kuta	3	3	Urban villages	Kerobokan; Kerobokan Kelod; Kerobokan Kaja
51.03.02	Mengwi	5	15	Rural villages	Baha; Buduk; Cemagi; Gulingan; Kekeran; Kuwum; Mengwi; Mengwitani; Munggu; Penarungan; Pererenan; Sembung; Sobangan; Tumbak Bayuh; Werdi Bhuwana
51.03.02	Mengwi	5	15	Urban villages	Abianbase; Kapal; Lukluk; Sading; Sempidi
51.03.04	Petang		7	Rural villages	Belok; Carangsari; Getasan; Pangsan; Pelaga; Petang; Sulangai
	TOTAL	16	46		

== Transportation ==
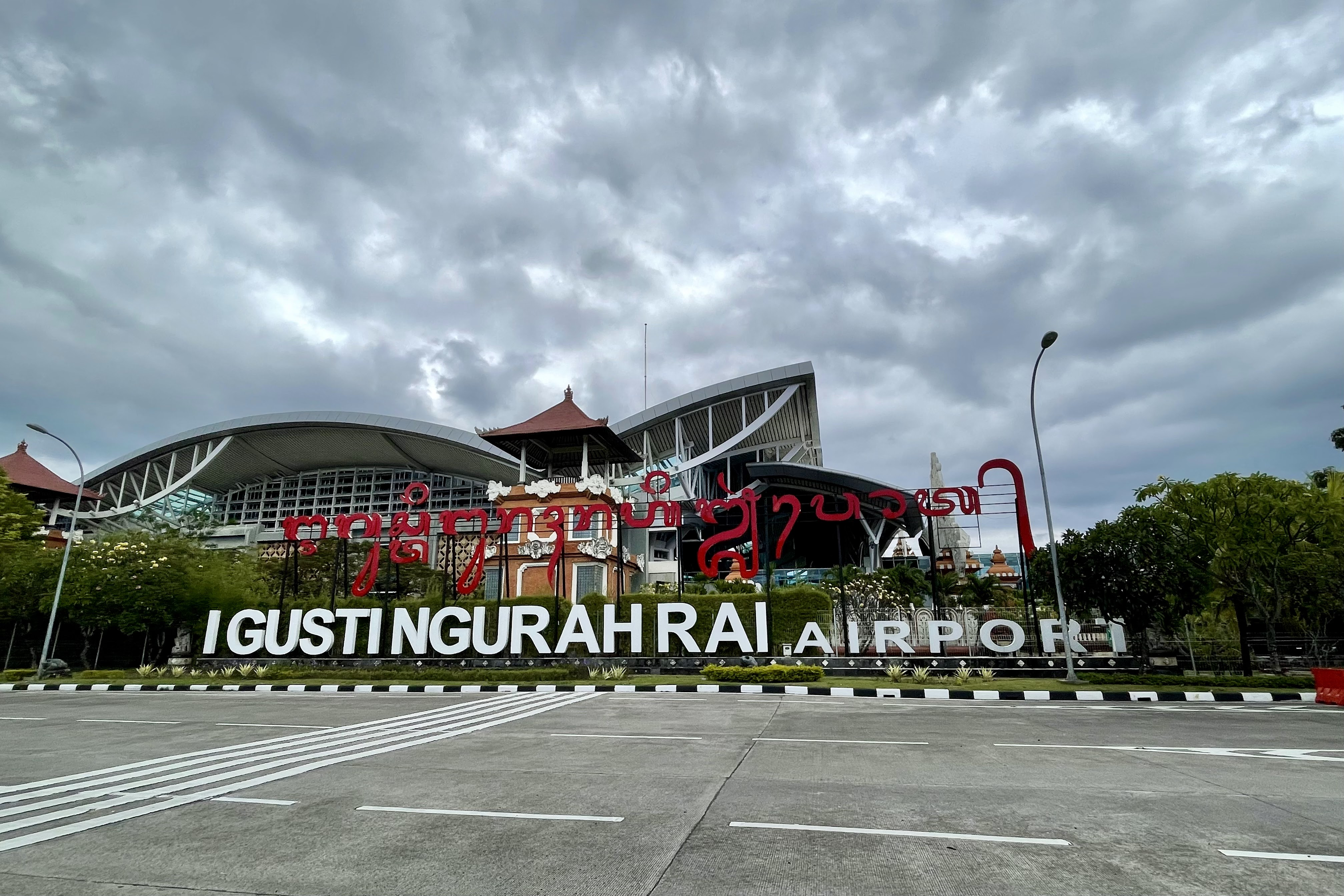
I Gusti Ngurah Rai International Airport

The Ngurah Rai International Airport is located near Jimbaran, on the isthmus at the southernmost part of the island. Lt. Col. Wisnu Airfield is in northwest Bali.

== Demographics ==
Badung Regency is home to many people from outside Bali who came for work. Therefore, its ethnic makeup is more cosmopolitan than rural Bali, although some parts of the regency itself are still agricultural and rural. It has an area of 418.52 square kilometres (161.59 sq mi) with a population of 548,191 (at the 2020 Census), giving a density of 1,309.8 per square kilometre. The official estimate as at mid 2022 was 549,527 (comprising 275,168 males and 274,359 females).

=== Ethnicities ===
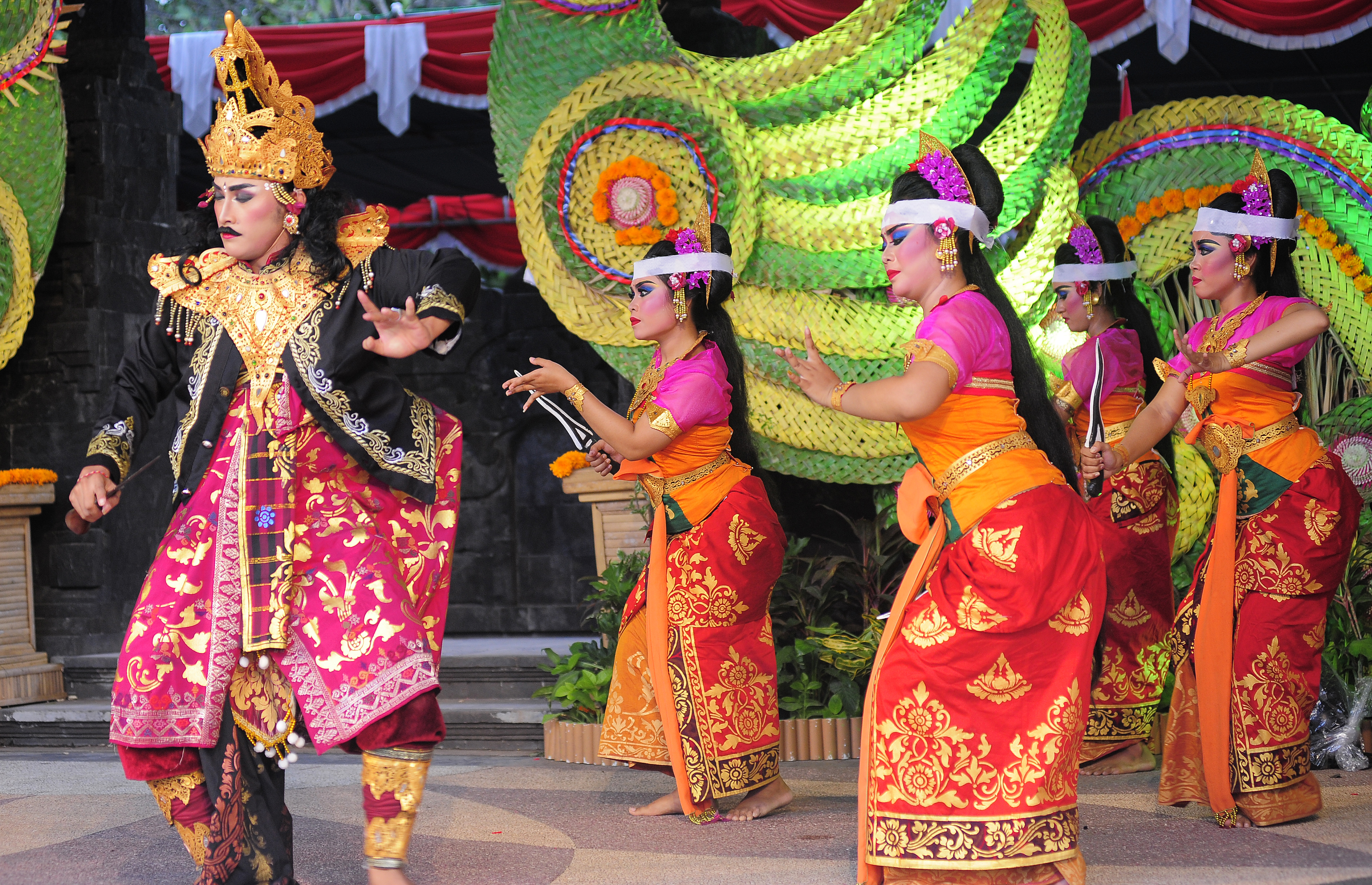
Story of the Badung people's struggle dance.

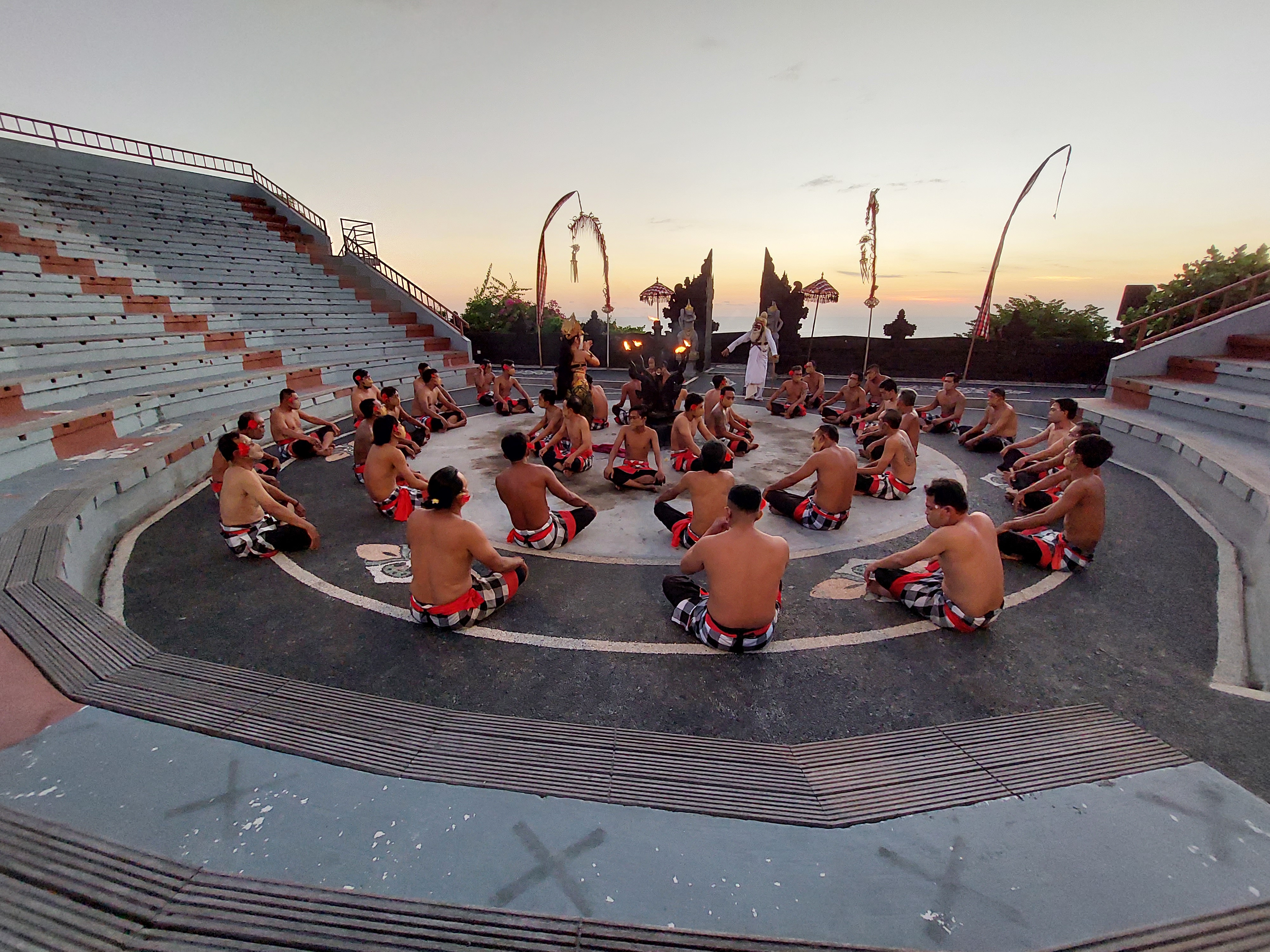
Kecak dancers at Pura Luhur Uluwatu.

Bali Province is home to the Balinese and Bali Aga ethnic groups, as is the case in this district. Based on data from the Central Bureau of Statistics in the Indonesian Population Census 2010, as many as 425,988 people or 78.40% of the 543,332 people of Badung Regency are of the Balinese ethnic group. Badung residents from other tribes, many come from the Javanese ethnic, and some are Madurese, Sasak, Sundanese, Chinese, Flores, Malays, Bugis, Batak, and several other ethnic groups.

The following is the population of Badung Regency based on ethnicity in 2010:

No.	Ethnic groups	Pop. (2010)	Pct. (%)
1	Balinese	425,848	78.40%
2	Javanese	82,218	15.13%
3	Madurese	7,099	1.31%
4	Sasak	3,234	0.60%
5	Sunda	2,776	0.51%
6	Flores	1,808	0.33%
7	Chinese	1,542	0.28%
8	Bugis	1,063	0.20%
9	Malays	656	0.12%
10	Others	16,948	3.12%
	Badung Regency	543,332	100%

=== Religion ===
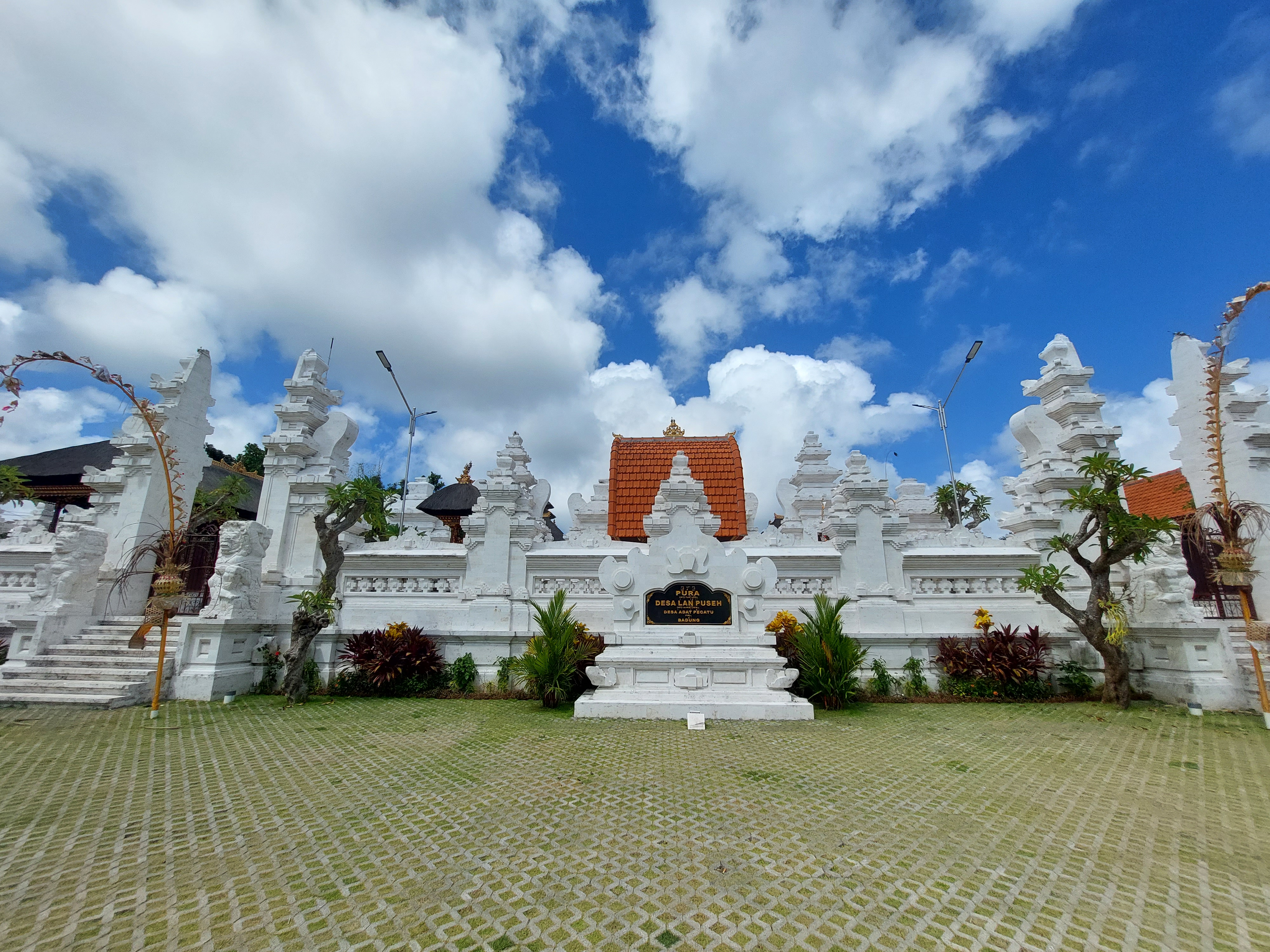
Pura Desa Lan Puseh, Pecatu Traditional Village

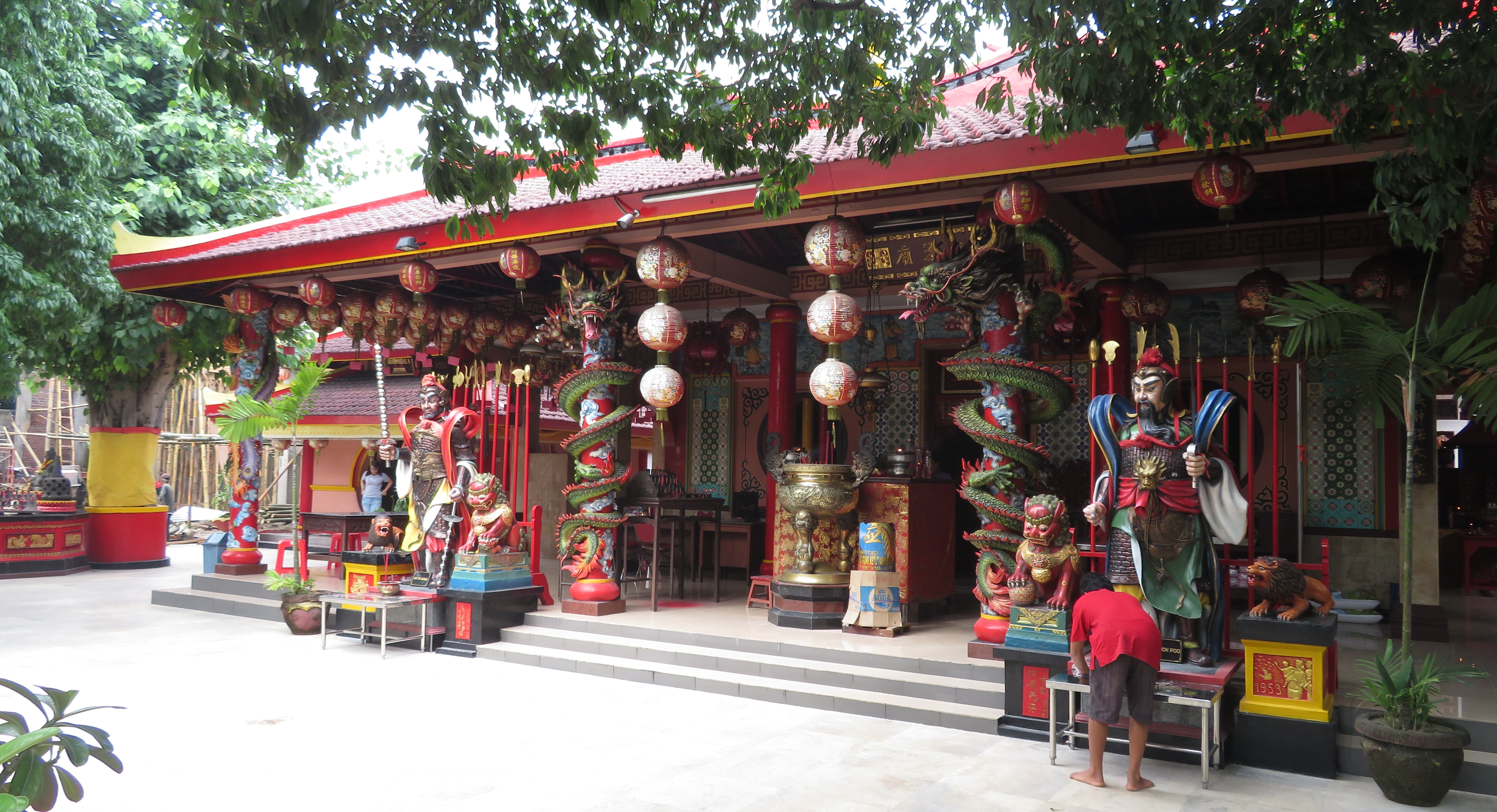
Vihara Viharaya Dharmayana, Kuta

The religions practiced by the people of Badung Regency are very diverse, with the majority being Hindu. The people of Balinese are generally Hindu, and some are Christian and Islam. Meanwhile, the people of Javanese, Malay, Bugis, Sundanese, Sasak are generally Islam, and some mixed with local residents choosing to convert to Hinduism. Some peoples of Flores, Batak, and some Chinese, are Christian.

Based on data from the Ministry of Home Affairs semester 2 of 2024, as many as 81.96% of the population of Badung Regency adheres to the Hinduism religion. Then the population who are Islam are 11.01%. The rest are Christian as much as 6.24%, where Protestant as much as 3.92% and Catholic as much as 2.32%. The population who are Buddhist as much as 0.78%, and Confucian as much as 0.01%. For places of worship, there are 6,244 temples, then 16 mosques, 77 prayer rooms, 113 Protestant churches, 17 Catholic churches and 8 monasteries.

== Health ==
Some of the hospitals in Badung Regency include:

- Badung Regency Mangusada Regional Hospital
- Siloam Hospital of Bali
- BIMC Special Surgery Hospital
- Graha Asih Hospital
- Kasih Ibu Hospital Kedonganan
- BIMC Special Surgery Hospital
- Surya Husadha Nusa Dua Hospital

== Tourism ==
Tourism is the main economy of Bandung Regency, tourism is the mainstay of the economy of this regency.

I Gusti Ngurah Rai International Airport

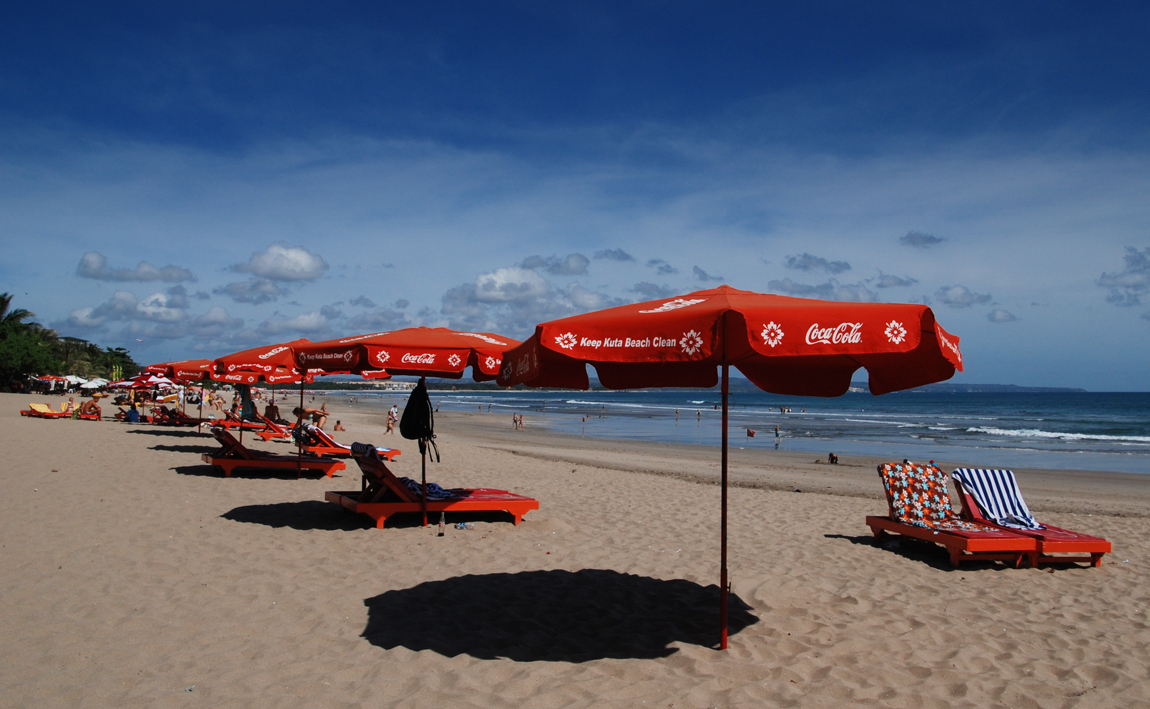
Kuta Beach, one of the beaches that is visited by many tourists in Badung Regency

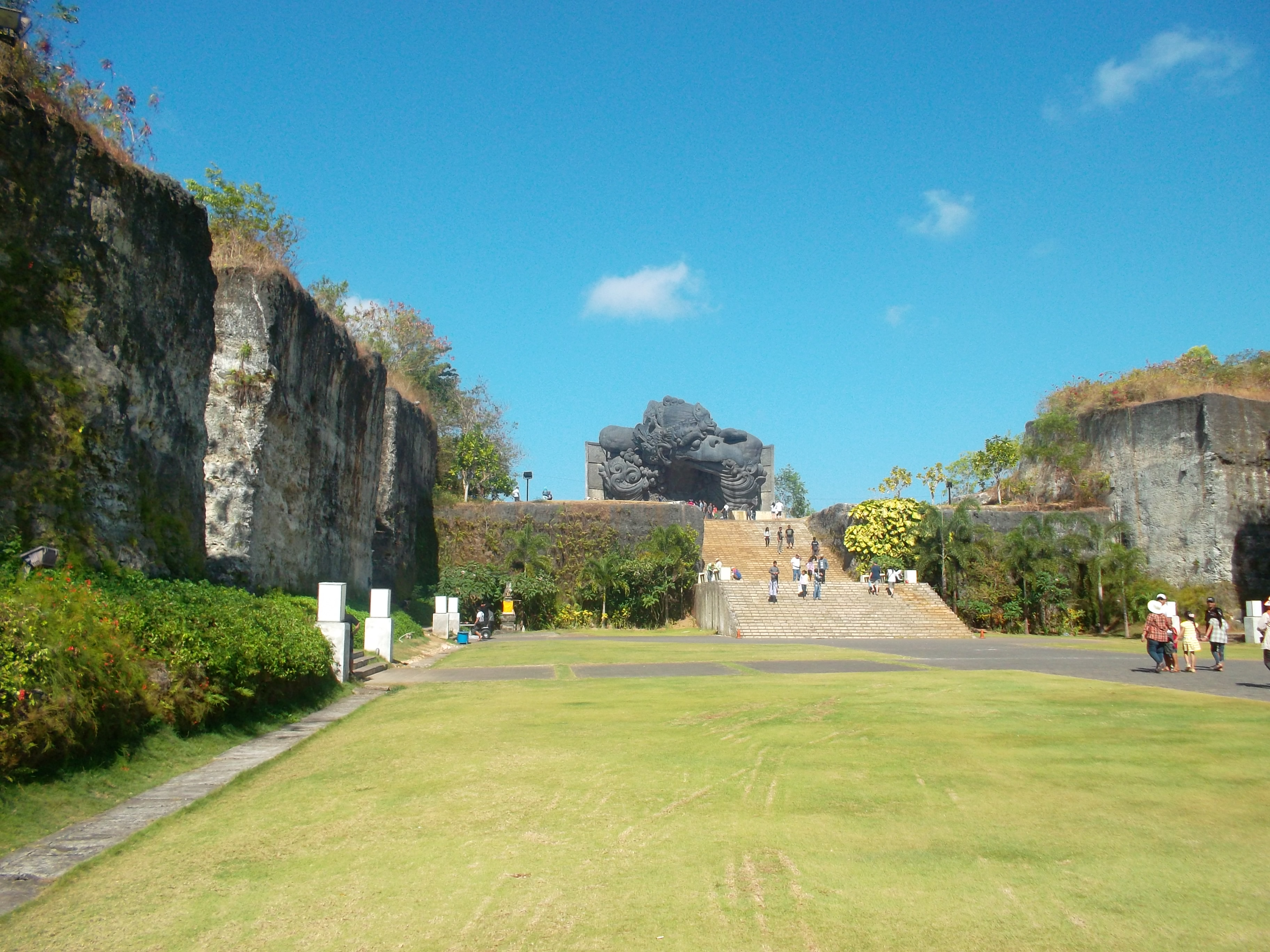
Garuda Wisnu Kencana (GWK) Complex

In Badung Regency there are many tourist attractions that are often visited by local and foreign tourists, for example:

1. Nungnung Waterfall
2. Makotek Attraction in Munggu Village
3. Ayung Rafting
4. Dukuh Camping Ground, Blahkiuh
5. Bungy Jumping
6. Petang Village
7. Plaga Village
8. Kapal Village
9. Tipat Bantal War (Kapal Village)
10. Beach Dreamland
11. Padang-Padang Beach
12. Tukad Bangkung Bridge (longest in Bali Nusa Tenggara and Highest in Southeast Asia
13. Penataran Temple Puspem Badung
14. Seseh Beach
15. Batu Bolong Beach
16. Brawa Beach
17. Badung Industrial Area (Bay Pass Sunset Road, Kuta)
18. Oberoi Night Tourism Area
19. Baha Tourism Village
20. Garuda Wisnu Kencana (GWK)
21. Geger Sawangan
22. Indonesia Tourism Development Corporation Area Nusa Dua
23. Mandala Wisata
24. Monument to the Humanitarian Tragedy Bali Bombing
25. East Kuta Arts Stage
26. Canggu Beach
27. Jimbaran Beach
28. Kedonganan Beach
29. Kuta Beach, Legian, Seminyak
30. Legian International Area
31. Labuan Sait Beach
32. Nyang-Nyang Beach
33. Beach Suluban
34. Gatot Kaca Warrior Statue
35. Deluang Sari Turtle Conservation
36. Peti Tenget Temple
37. Pucak Tedung Temple
38. Sadha Temple
39. Taman Ayun Temple
40. Uluwatu Temple
41. Horse Safari
42. Sangeh Nature Tourism Park
43. Indonesia Jaya Reptile Park
44. Mangupura City
45. Tanah Wuk
46. Tanjung Benoa
47. Waka Tangga
48. Water Boom Park, Kuta, Badung
49. Pelaga Agro Tourism
50. Puja Mandala Nusa Dua

== Wildlife conservation ==
On 8 November 2011 a breeding center for the endangered Bali starling was officially inaugurated in Sibang, Badung Regency inside the Green School area with an initial 73 starlings. Twenty of the birds came from various zoos in Europe, another three came from Jurong Bird Park in Singapore, and the others were already at the breeding center. If the breeding program gets success, some of them will be released into the wild, four of the breeding stock to Koelner Zoo and three to Jurong Bird Park. There were currently about 500 birds throughout Bali, 287 of them in breeding centers.

== Gallery ==
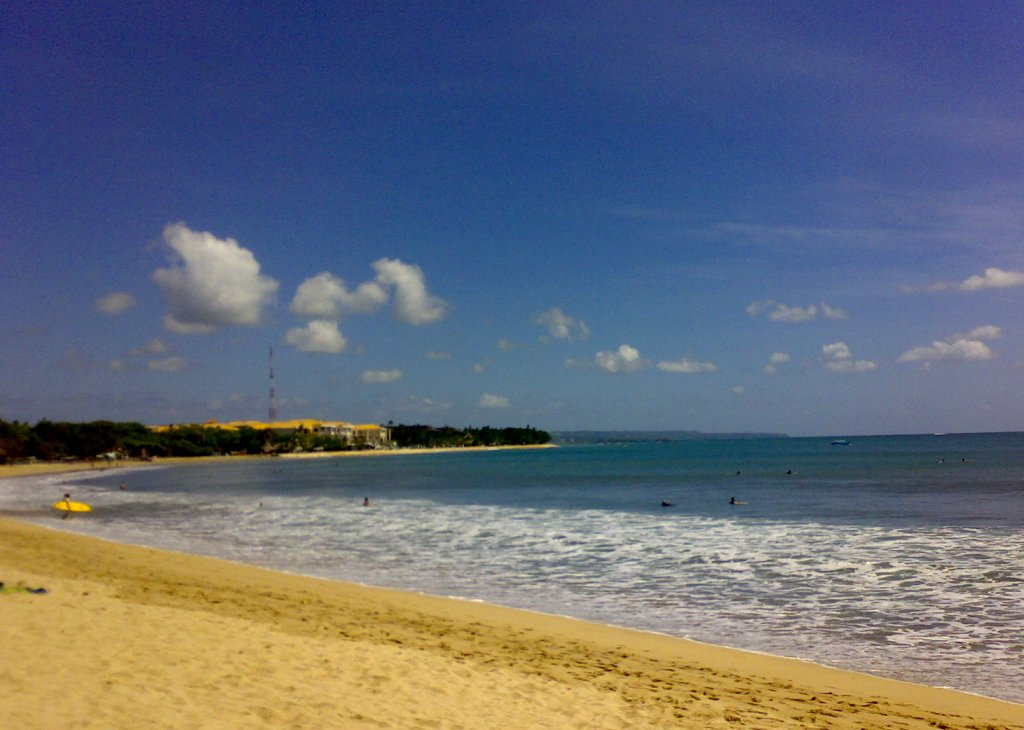
Kuta Beach

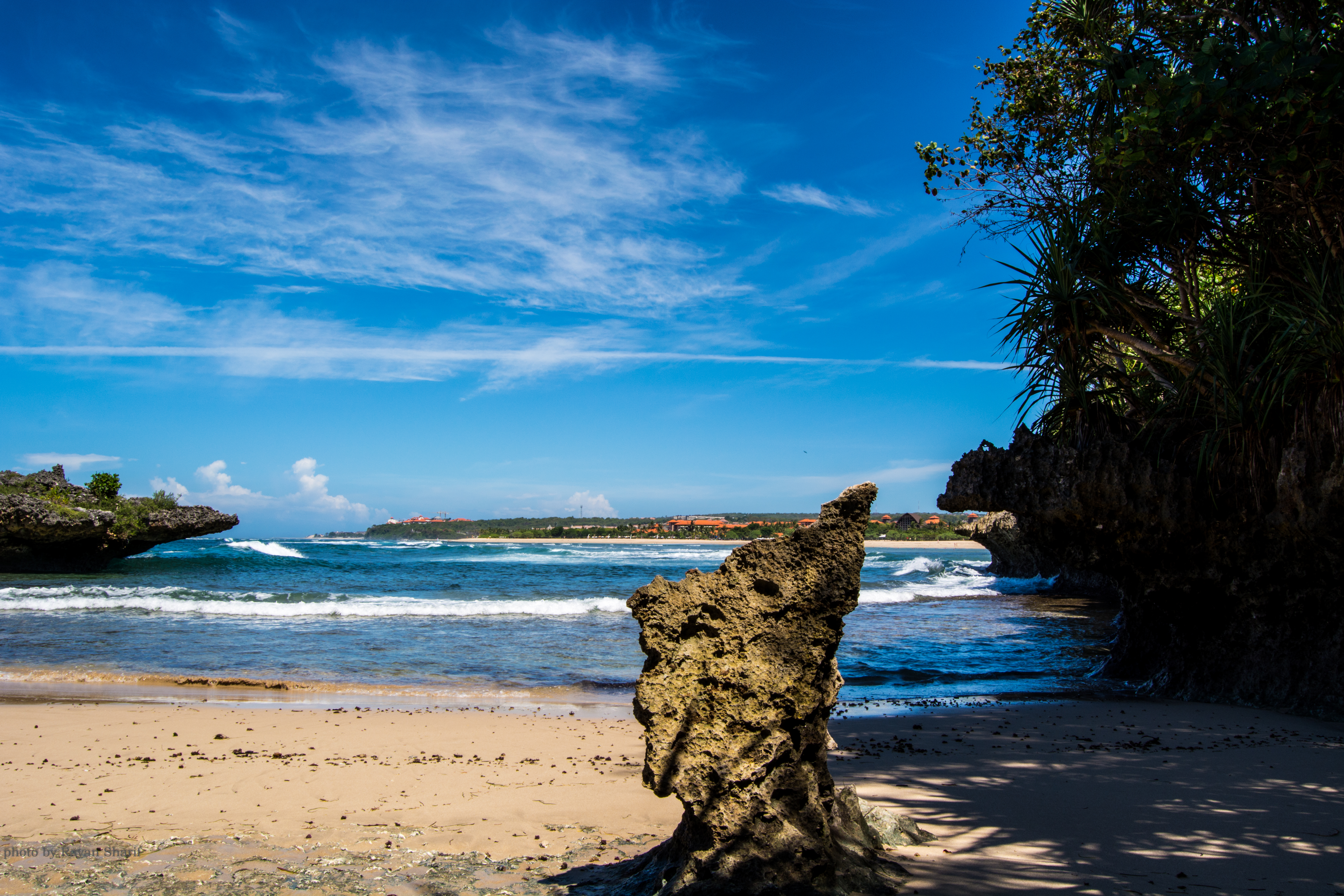
Nusa Dua

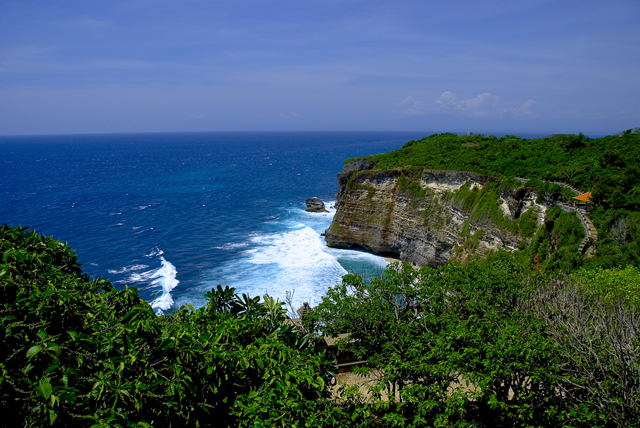
Uluwatu

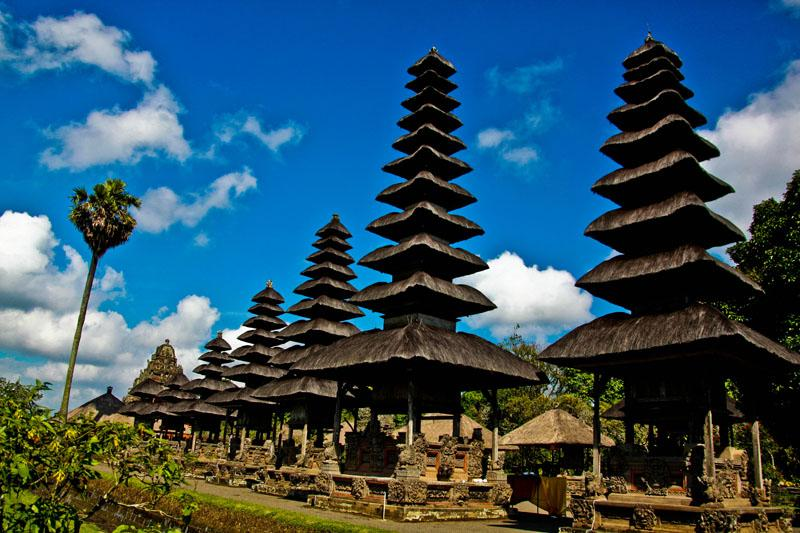
Taman Ayun Temple

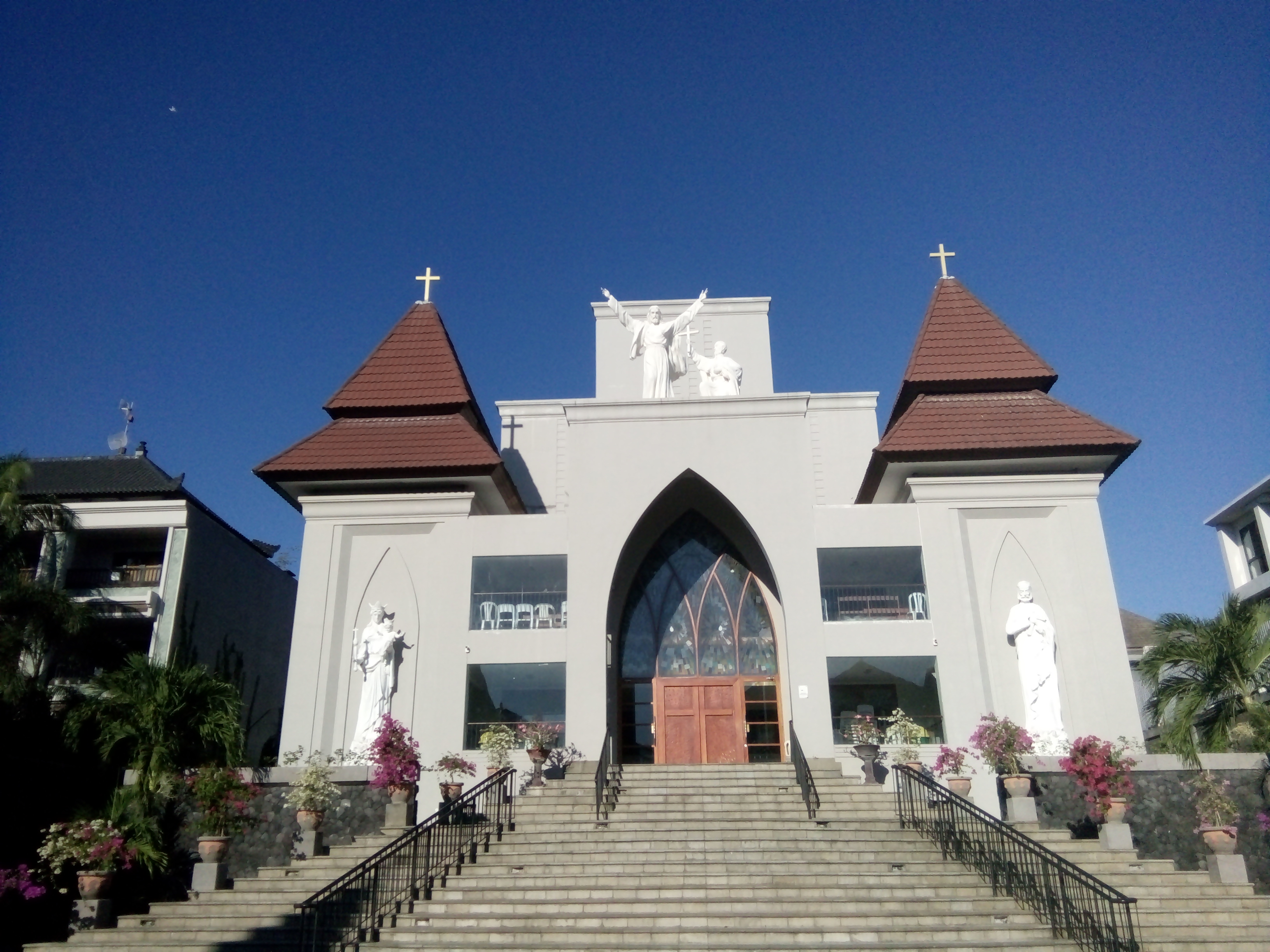
St. Francis Xavier Catholic Church, Kuta
