= Seminyak =

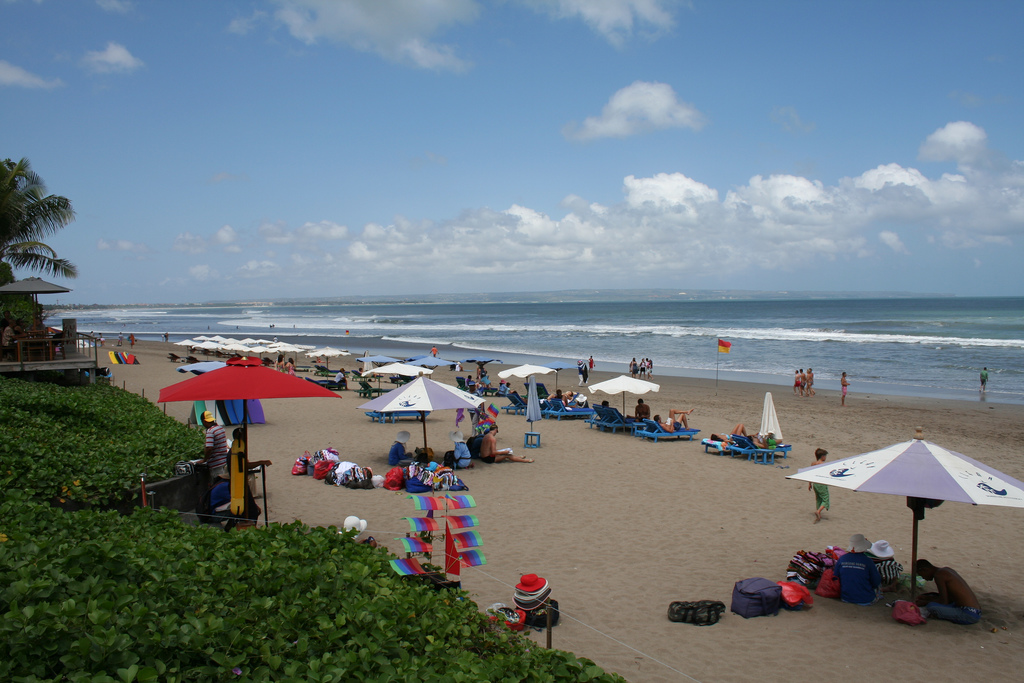
- Seminyak Beach

- Location in Badung Regency Location in Bali
- Coordinates: 8°41′S 115°10′E
- Country: Indonesia
- Province: Bali
- Metropolitan area: Sarbagita

Seminyak is a mixed tourist residential area on the west coast of Bali in Indonesia, just north of Kuta and Legian.

Originally a separate township, this is now a suburb of Kuta. This area is very popular with resident expatriates; land and accommodation prices are amongst the highest in Bali. Luxury spas and hotels abound. Owing to its high density of high-end shopping, combined with the clustering of many fine eating establishments, it has rapidly become one of the busiest tourist areas on the island.

In addition to a few commercial strips with popular and lively restaurants, bars, villas, and crafts/furniture shops, there is at least one hotel.

Jalan Raya Seminyak (more often referred to as Jalan Legian), runs parallel with the beach, bisecting the district and acts as its main road artery.

== See also ==
- Jalan Legian
- List of beaches in Indonesia
