= Tibubeneng =

- Village
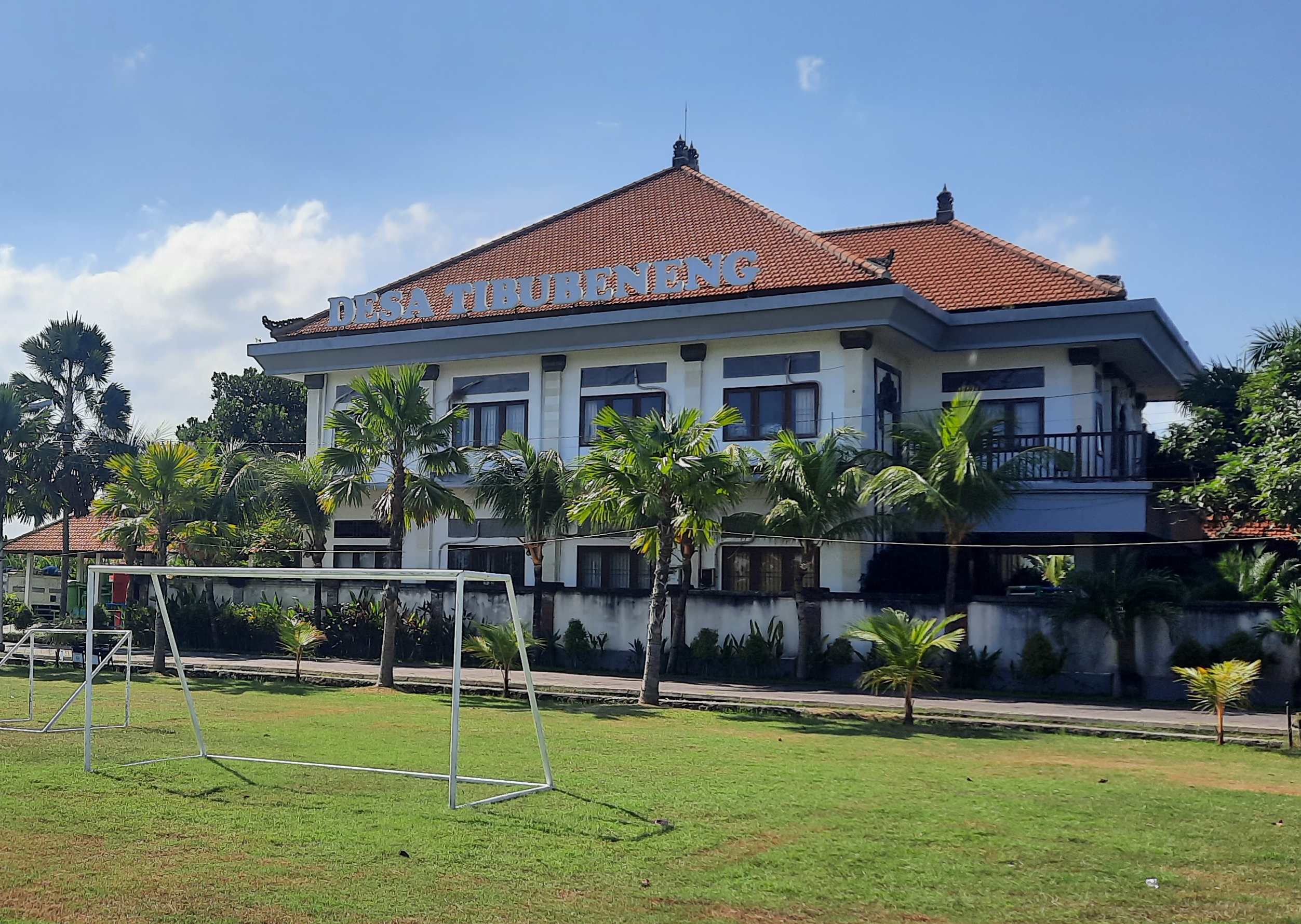
- Tibubeneng village admin building

- Location within Bali
- Coordinates: 8°38′49″S 115°09′1″E
- Country: Indonesia
- Province: Bali

Government
  - Perbekel: I Made Kamajaya

Area
  - Total: 6.50 km^{2} (2.51 sq mi)

Population (2018)
  - Total: 10,919
- Postal code: 80361
- Website: desatibubeneng.badungkab.go.id

Tibubeneng is a village in the south of Bali, Indonesia.

Tibubeneng was part of Canggu until it was split off in 1997. It is headed by an elected perbekel, or village head. The village has five elementary schools and one junior high school. The majority of the inhabitants follow Balinese Hinduism, although there is a large Muslim minority. In 2018, as part of the Berawa Beach Festival, a total of 5,555 kecak dancers performed simultaneously, setting a world record.
