= South Kuta =

District in Badung Regency, Bali Province, Indonesia

South Kuta Kuta Selatan
- District
- Location of South Kuta District within Badung Regency
- Country: Indonesia
- Region: Lesser Sunda Islands
- Province: Bali
- Regency: Badung

Area
  - Total: 101.45 km^{2} (39.17 sq mi)

Population (mid 2025 estimate)
  - Total: 124,939
  - Density: 1,231.5/km^{2} (3,189.7/sq mi)
- Website: kutaselatan.badungkab.go.id

South Kuta (Indonesian: Kuta Selatan) is a district (kecamatan) within Badung Regency of Bali. It consists of the Bukit Peninsula, a large peninsula projecting south from Bali island.

It covers 101.45 km^{2} and had a population of 116,143 people as of the 2010 Census and 131,139 at the 2020 Census; the official estimate as at mid 2025 was 124,939 (comprising 61,974 males and 62,965 females).

It includes six villages, listed below with their areas and their populations at the 2010 Census and 2020 Census, together with the official estimates as at mid 2025.

Name	Area in km^{2}	Pop'n 2010 Census	Pop'n 2020 Census	Pop'n mid 2025 estimate
Pecatu	26.08	7,378	13,713	8,637
Unggasan	15.52	14,221	16,716	16,530
Kutuh	9.76	3,606	5,322	5,853
Benoa	26.04	39,570	41,722	42,305
Tanjung Benoa	1.35	6,767	6,376	6,094
Jimbaran	22.71	44,376	47,290	45,520
Totals	101.45	115,918	131,139	124,939

Jimbaran lies at the southern end of the isthmus connecting the Bukit Peninsula – a harsh, scrubby limestone plateau off the south side of Bali – with the urban areas of Kuta and Tuban further north. Pecatu, Unggasan and Kutuh are villages high up on the plateau, while Benoa lies at the eastern end of the peninsula and contains the resort area of Nusa Dua, with Tanjung Benoa forming a narrow sandbar extending north towards Denpasar.
