= Amed (Bali) =

Group of fishing villages in Karangasem Regency on the north coast of Bali

Coordinates: 8°20′S 115°39′E

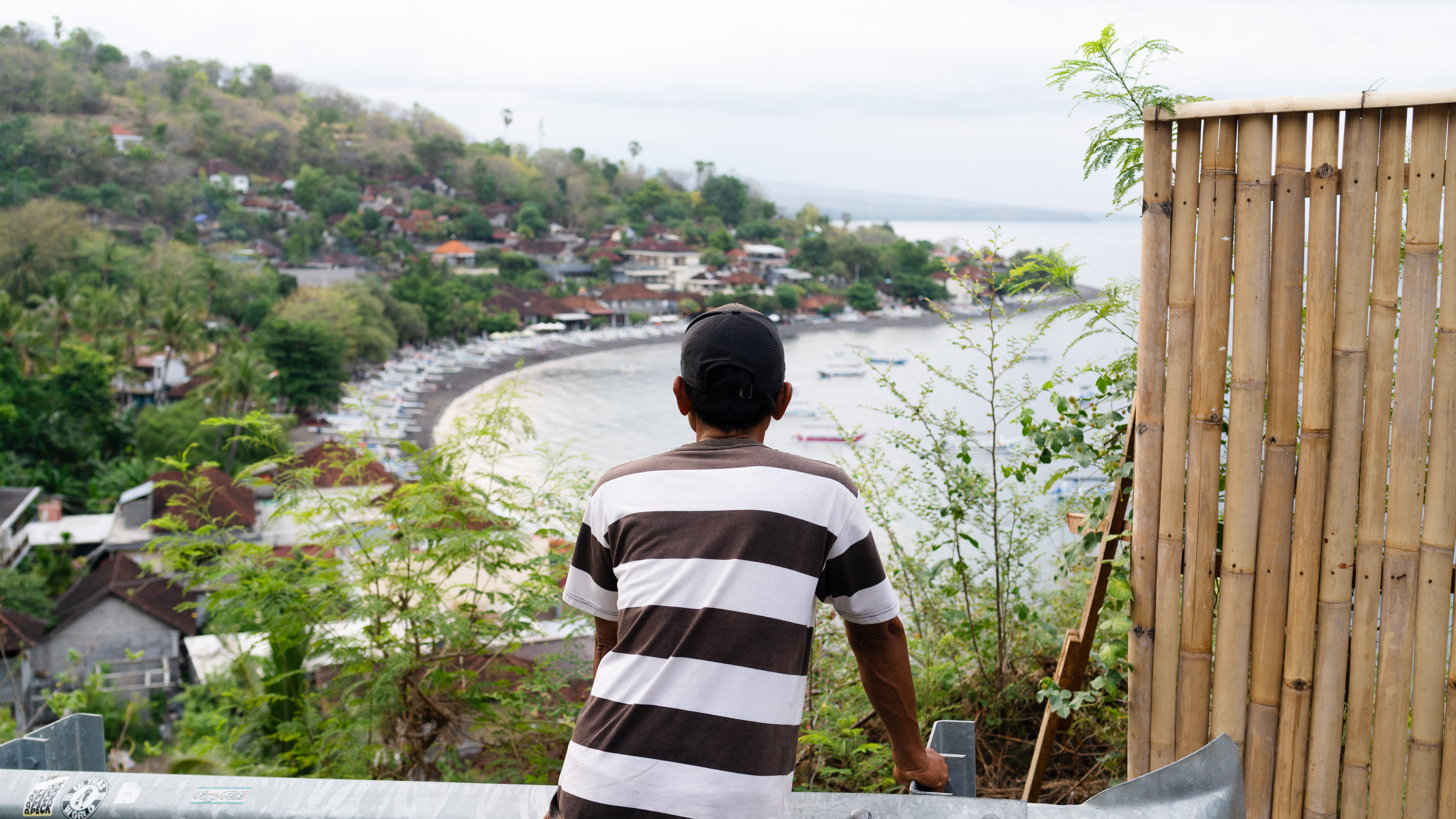
A local enjoys the view overlooking Amed Beach

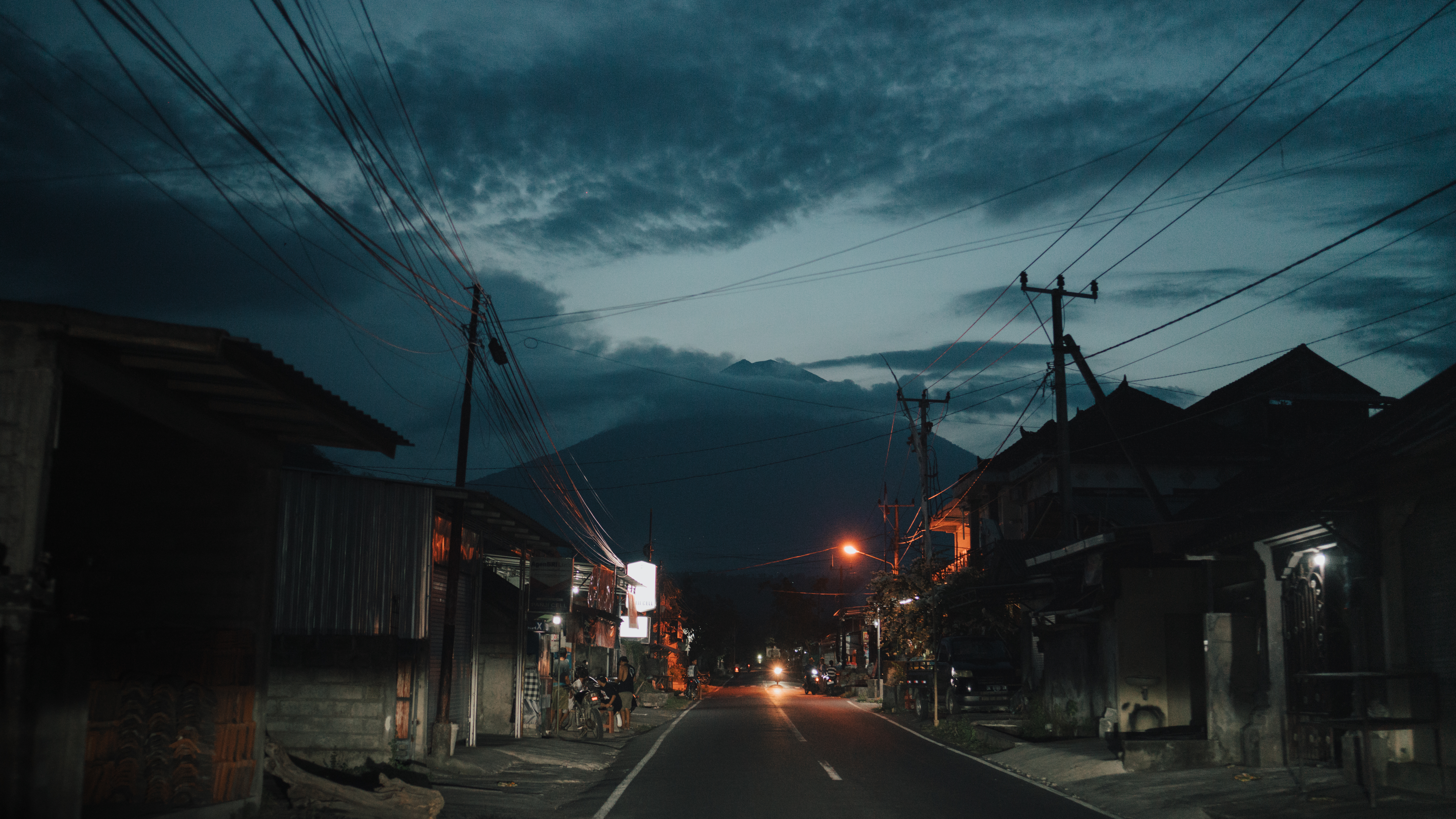
Mount Agung is visible in the background at night

Amed is a village on the east coast (north-east side) in Abang District, Karangasem Regency, Bali, Indonesia. In the wake of heavy tourism development, actors in the tourism industry use the village's name to designate a 14-km stretch of coast that includes several other villages, namely from west to east: Amed, Jemeluk, Bunutan, Lipah, Lehan, Selang, Banyuning, Aas and Kusambi. A more correct geographical name would be the north coast of the Seraya peninsula, or North Seraya.

Many beaches in the area, including Amed Beach, have black volcanic sand as they are close to Mount Agung, Bali's largest volcano.

== Marine protected area, a special environment ==
Bali island is entirely in the Coral Triangle, a marine area of the western Pacific Ocean that is particularly rich in coral diversity - and other marine species that depend on corals. The Coral Triangle is marked by the "Indonesian Throughflow", (Note: The Indonesian Throughflow is part of the Global conveyor belt, a system of deep currents spanning both Atlantic and Pacific oceans.) a complex set of currents - and the largest on Earth - created by the difference in sea-level between the Pacific Ocean to the north-east of the Indonesian archipelago and the Indian Ocean to the south-west - involving the trade winds and associated oceanic currents, and their opposite directions between northern and southern hemispheres.

One of the branches of the Indonesian Throughflow passes in the Lombok Strait - between Bali and Lombok, where the seafloor is higher; this creates upwellings, that bring up nutrients from the bottom of the ocean. Thus the east point of Bali, including Amed's area, is particularly rich in marine life.

A number of Bali's coastal areas have become Marine Protected Areas in 2017, including a stretch of coast that starts about 2/3 of a mile east of Amed, follows the coast up to the easternmost point of Bali (Kusambi) and ends on the south side of Pantai Batu Kori (East Seraya); this area is part of the "Karangasem Bali Marine Conservation" area.

In recent years, the Lipah Bay Coral Nursery was established by several local groups, mainly by Calypso Diving Bali, this is another valuable stepping stone into protection of the local coral reef environments and supports the local Marine Protected Areas.

== Tourism ==
The area of Tulamben-Amed is one of three areas (Note: The three areas designated as National Tourism Strategic Areas in Karangasem Regency are Tulamben-Amed, Karangasem-Amuk (between Padangbai and Candi Dasa, south-east coast) and Besakih-Mount Agung.) in Karangasem Regency designated as National Tourism Strategic Areas. (Note: Karangasem Regency also has three Tourism Strategic Areas: Candidasa, Ujung and Tulamben, along with other tourist attractions scattered in the regency.)

=== Diving ===
It has become known as a diving area (free diving, scuba diving) with such sites as the famous USAT Liberty Wreck, submerged in front of Tulamben just 12 km north-west from the village of Amed; the Japanese shipwreck (Note: The "Japanese shipwreck" in Banyuning got its name from a nearly intact toilet that was - righfully or not - identified as typically Japanese style. Other than that, little is known about that ship's origin and/or sinking; its upright position in the water and it being surrounded by crankshafts and other engine room debris, suggests that its end was a violent one. It lies a few metres from the beach at a depth between 6 and 12 metres according to some, between 2 and 12 metres according to others. On its north-west side, a sloping sandy bank about 60 m long leads to some outcrops of coral reefs at a depth of about 12 m. On its south-east side, past the headland and along the coastline, from about 12 m to 30 m down, there is a variety of the smaller species such as pygmy seahorses, several sea fans, gobies and nudi’s; returning to the wreck, there is a shelf that runs from about 12 m deep up to the beach, with a great diversity of species.) in Lipah bay, Banyuning, now broken open but no less rich in species; the "Coral Wall" (Note: The "Coral Wall", on the east side of Jemeluk Bay, presents an array of sponges and corals between 12 and 22 metres deep.) on the east side of Jemeluk Bay; Batu Belah ( about 2 km north-west of Amed) and Seraya for muck diving associated with a wide range of macrophotography opportunities; the Pyramids (Note: The Pyramids: around the year 2000, groups of three square concrete structures were stacked on top of each other in the shape of pyramids, interconnected with rubber tires, at a depth of 15 to 22 m or to 30 m, creating an habitat for stingrays, trunk fish, puffer fish, moray eels, cuttlefish, turtles and much more. Beside these stands a naturel reef, equally teeming with life.) off Amed beach, less than a kilometer from Jemeluk Bay; the Ghost Bay in Amed (village), where the reef was destroyed to provide building material in the 1980s and concrete structures sunk 20 years later; the Coral Garden off Jemeluk beach with sunken Balinese statues...

=== Other tourism ===
It is slowly getting known as a destination for backpacker tourism and yoga classes and teacher training.

=== Consequences of tourism and other developments ===
Up until the 1980s, Amed and its area had traditional salt fields on the beaches and notably rich coastal waters. In the late 80's, two things happened: the introduction of the fishing net as an “innovative” and more efficient fishing method, and the start of the tourism industry. The nets would get caught in the reefs, and there was a growing demand for building materials.

So over several years the locals destroyed the reefs in front of Amed village as a solution to both problems - thus creating a far bigger one - similar to that in Candidasa : their beach, unprotected from the pounding of the waves, shrunk by 100 metres - a process helped by global warming which raises the ocean surface -, along with the salt fields - and the marine life that attracted tourists in the first place. Nearby reefs remained, though, so tourism did not lose as much as it would otherwise have done.

The higher prices of land used for tourism facilities, mean that tourism activities are taking over areas previously dedicated to food production, in particular rice farming and salt harvesting. The change in land use has increased by 4% per year, with an intensity of 33 buildings per hectare.

Unsustainable business practices and tourist behaviours are a significant threat to the environment. Coral reefs are particularly fragile in that regard: 75% of reefs worldwide are threatened by human activities as well as climate change and ocean acidification; without protection and restoration works, 90% of coral reefs will be threatened by 2030. Yet they shelter and feed 33% of all the fish species in the ocean and are important breeding grounds for 25% of all marine species. The Amed Dive Center was the first to start rehabilitation work in the area in 2003. The association Bali Conservation Diving, based in Tulamben, now also undertakes conservation work in the area, taking in volunteers.

== See also ==
- List of fishing villages
