= Tuban (disambiguation) =

Tuban may refer to:

Indonesia

- Tuban, Tuban Regency, East Java
- Tuban, Kuta, Badung Regency, Bali
- Tuban Regency, East Java

Yemen

- Tuban District
