= Echo Beach (disambiguation) =

"Echo Beach" is a 1980 song by Martha and the Muffins.

Echo Beach may also refer to:

- Echo Beach (TV series), a British TV series
- Echo Beach (Port Colborne), a community within Port Colborne, Ontario, Canada
- Echo Beach, Ontario, a community within the Township of Muskoka Lakes, Ontario, Canada
- Echo Beach, an outdoor concert venue at Ontario Place in Toronto, Ontario, Canada
- Echo Beach, Zanzibar, Tanzania, a 5-acre stretch of beach and hotel resort in Zanzibar, Tanzania, Africa
- Echo Beach, Bali, Indonesia is a surfing area in Bali, in the village of Canggu
