= Desa Potato Head Bali =

Hotel and entertainment complex in Bali, Indonesia

Coordinates: 8°40′44″S 115°09′01″E

- Interactive map of the Desa Potato Head Bali area

General information
- Location: Seminyak, Badung Regency, Bali
- Current tenants: Potato Head Studios; Potato Head Suites
- Opening: 2015
- Owner: Ronald Akili

Design and construction
- Awards: "Certified B Impact Corporation" by B Lab Global (2023)"; Best Beach Resorts in Indonesia" by Travel + Leisure Luxury Awards Asia Pacific (2024); Winner of The Eco Hotel Award by the Sustainable Restaurant Association (2025); The World’s 50 Best Hotels (2023, 2024, 2025)

Other information
- Number of rooms: 226
- Number of suites: 58
- Number of restaurants: 6

Website
- seminyak.potatohead.co

Desa Potato Head Bali is a beachfront resort and hotel complex located at Seminyak, Bali, Indonesia. The resort complex includes a hotel, beach club, dining venues, and art installations. The resort was founded by Ronald Akili and was an architectural collaboration between OMA and Andra Matin.

== History ==
=== Early ideas and development ===
Potato Head initially began as a restaurant brand and bar in Jakarta, called Potato Head Jakarta. It was launched in 2009 under the hospitality group of PTT Family. After the popularity gained as a brand, Potato Head expanded to Bali. After a year of development, Potato Head officially opened in Seminyak in 2010 and named as Potato Head Beach Club. Potato Head Beach Club was designed as an amphitheatre-like structure made from thousands of recycled and reclaimed wooden shutters which immediately become an architectural landmark.

==== Role of Ronald Akili ====
Potato Head was founded by Ronald Akili, an Indonesian Singapore-based entrepreneur and art collector. His father, Rudy Akili founded the "Akili Museum of Art" in Jakarta. With his background as an art collector and gallerist, he and his team planned to develop a beach club with sustainable vision, projected the spaces not only functional but also culturally expressive and visually compelling. To this commitment towards sustainability and culture, Akili introduced the guiding philosophy Good Times, Do Good, embedding environmental awareness and community engagement into the core of the brand. Furthermore, Akili also has vision to the long-term transformation of the beach club into a holistic environment concept called desa (village), which include education, wellness, and cultural exchange.

=== Expansion into a "Desa" ===
The expansion from a beach club into a "desa" was initiated in 2010 at the shore of Petitenget Beach. Akili and his team managed to acquire a three-hectare site which later he transformed into the village. It then developed into an integrated complex, consisting of two hotel buildings, restaurants, and art installations. The creative village aimed to collaborate hospitalities with cultural aspects, as well as sustainability, to promote local and Indonesian culture to the visitors.

The development of the "creative village" also ignited the development and foundation of the Potato Head Studios. As the "creative playground", The Potato Head Studios consists of 168 rooms and was later introduced as the key component of the village. This expansion was formally opened in 2021, as part of a collaboration with David Gianotten of OMA. The collaboration innovated a brutalist-styled, combined with tropical design complex, which shaped the entire hotel area.

Katamama, a former boutique hotel was later reopened and rebranded as Potato Head Suites. The opening ceremony, which took place on 28 June 2022, marked the former boutique hotel’s integration toward the creative village. Potato Head Suites comprises 58 suites, in which some suites offer the view of the Indian Ocean. These suites also have access to the beach club and other amenities offered by the village.

=== Post-expansion development ===
The major expansion of the original beach club into a cultural and creative village, comprising the Potato Head Studios and Potato Head Suites, was pushed by the motivation to promote the integrity between hospitality, environmental and cultural aspects. In 2018, Potato Head committed to the Climate Neutral Now Initiative by the United Nations Framework Convention on Climate Change (UNFCCC) to strictly measure and reduce greenhouse gas emissions. This pledge also encouraged the hotel to cultivate rubbish innovatively, as well as to comply with the zero-waste policy. In the same year, the brand became Indonesia’s first carbon-neutral hospitality brand.

This expansion also includes the empowerment of the locals, especially the Indonesian and Balinese culture. The village also features a creative center dedicated to sustainability, which features cultural and art immersion. It was built to be the place where tourists can learn about the local culture and interact with the local community.

== Architecture and design ==
=== Potato Head Suites ===
Potato Head Suites was the initial hotel component of the entire "desa" complex. It was previously known as "Katamama", Indonesian language for "Mama says.." Katamama was a boutique hotel designed by a famous Indonesian architect, [Andra Matin. While Matin worked on almost entire architectural design, the interior was handled by PTT Family Creative Team and Takenouchi Webb. It was opened in March 2016 and founded with strong emphasis on materials, craftsmanship and local identity.

==== Architectural style and features ====
The suites’ façade are dominated by temple terracotta bricks and decorated by coconut shells which have already been fired and moulded, created by local hand-craftsmanship. Around 1.5 million bricks made up the entire façade. The buildings were built geometrically and surrounded by natural features. Its architectural style is Tropical Brutalist-Modernism which emphasizes on the contemporary of Indonesia centuries-old local tradition. The whole architectural style is intentionally intimate, inward-focused spatial character.

=== Potato Head Studios ===
Potato Head Studios was designed by the collaboration with OMA, a Dutch-based international architectural firm, led by David Gianotten. OMA’s role specifically focused on designing new hotel complexes and components. Its design emphasizes porosity and openness, particularly through an open-air circulation system to reduce the usage of air conditioners inside corridors.

==== Architectural style and features ====
The architectural features and style were adjusted to the typology of the resorts as located on a tropical island. The major facilities are accessible to the public and were built on a square-shaped structure, elevated above the ground. Circulation spaces are planned as semi-exterior environments, allowing natural ventilation and visual connectivity throughout the building. This approach shaped by Bali’s tropical climate, focusing on passive cooling, airflow, and shading over mechanical systems.

=== Material and sustainability ===
The architectural ideas of the 387,500-square-foot complex are based on regenerative design which emphasizes material practices and sustainability. The usage of reclaimed materials were drawn in the design itself, such as recycled plastic ceiling panels, functional bamboo sculpture, and art installations built from reclaimed materials such as ‘5,000 Lost Soles’ by German art activist Liina Klauss from reclaimed flip-flops and a Colosseum-inspired façade built from repurposed 6,600 window shutters.

In the vision of sustainability, Desa Potato Head also collaborated with many partners. In 2025, it has collaborated with British designer Max Lamb to launch "Collection 001", a series collection of functional items from discarded materials. This collaboration produced chair from plastic waste, candles from used cooking oil and furniture from recycled crushed glass, recycled styrofoam and shredded oyster shells. Its recycled item also produced from collaboration with Faye Toogood.

== Environmental strategies ==
=== Waste commitment and zero-waste policy ===
Desa Potato Head Bali has a zero-waste policy which underlining the importance of reducing and recycling waste in its area. This ambition came from an actual waste-problem that happened in Bali, as the island suffers from garbage mismanagement, thousands of illegal open dump sites and water littering problems. Aware of this problem becoming a threat to Bali’s tourism and environment, Akili has launched his Community Waste Project in November 2023, aiming to reduce waste especially from hotels and hospitality businesses. This US$200,000 program aimed to empower local staff on-site to handle organic, non-organic and garden waste from the whole Desa Potato Head complex. Desa Potato Head also used recycled and repurposed materials to support its sustainability agenda. As it collaborated with Max Lamb, they produced materials and furniture from daily waste, as the commitment to the zero-waste policy. In partnership with OMA, Potato Head curated an art exhibition at Singapore’s National Design Centre, titled "N*thing is Possible" from September to December 2022. For their entire commitment, Desa Potato Head was also awarded the winner of "This Year’s 50 Best Eco Hotel Award" by the Sustainable Restaurant Association in 2025.

== Facilities and amenities ==
In the "creative village" complex, there are some facilities and amenities, such as:

=== Hotel compounds ===
The whole complex consisted of two major hotel areas, the Potato Head Suites and the Potato Head Studios. It spanned across 387,500-square-foot with total rooms of 225, 167 at the Studio and the rest 58 at the Suites. Most of the rooms are designed in the modular form with balcony view of the Indian Ocean. The hotel has its own gardens and surrounded by natural topography of Bali.

=== Beach club ===
As its expansion and development from a beach club to an entire village, Desa Potato Head has its own beach club located at the shore of Petitenget Beach in Seminyak. The beach club is integrated with the hotel compound and resort and has its own live entertainment. Just like the rest of the resort, the Potato Head Beach Club also endorsed its vision on sustainability and zero-wasted policy.

=== Communal spaces ===
Inside the resort compound, Desa Potato Head has several communal spaces for cultural and event purposes. Some art installations were also installed at some major points of the complex. This includes the ‘‘5,000 Lost Soles’, sculptures and a Colosseum-inspired façade. The resort also has its wellness activities and programs, such as the "Merasa" regeneration program, in collaboration with American singer and actress, Erykah Badu.

In the area, there are six restaurants and dining areas. This includes a restaurant called "Tanaman", an Indonesian word for plant, which serves a hundred percent plant-based menu, which produced its own vegetables, oils, flavoured salts, ferments, and broths. There is also a retro-futuristic restaurant called "Dome" which offers wine hospitality and "Kaum", the Indonesian and Balinese restaurant in the complex, featuring local menu as a way to promote Indonesian cuisine to the visitor.

Desa Potato Head also partnered with English DJ, DJ Harvey and Dutch architectural firm, OMA as they launched a new nightclub in Bali, "Klymax Discotheque". Potato Head Design Studio were responsible for the club’s interior design.

== Reception ==
Desa Potato Head named among World’s 50 Best Hotels in 2023 and 2024 by The World’s 50 Best, and also in 2025, specifically in the category of Eco Hotel Award. It also has other several acknowledgment and awards, such as listed among "The best hotels in Asia: 2025 Readers’ Choice Awards" by Condé Nast Traveller, "Certified B Impact Corporation" by B Lab Global since 2023, "Best Beach Resorts in Indonesia" by Travel + Leisure Luxury Awards Asia Pacific 2024 and the Winner of The Eco Hotel Award by the Sustainable Restaurant Association.
