= Candi Dasa =

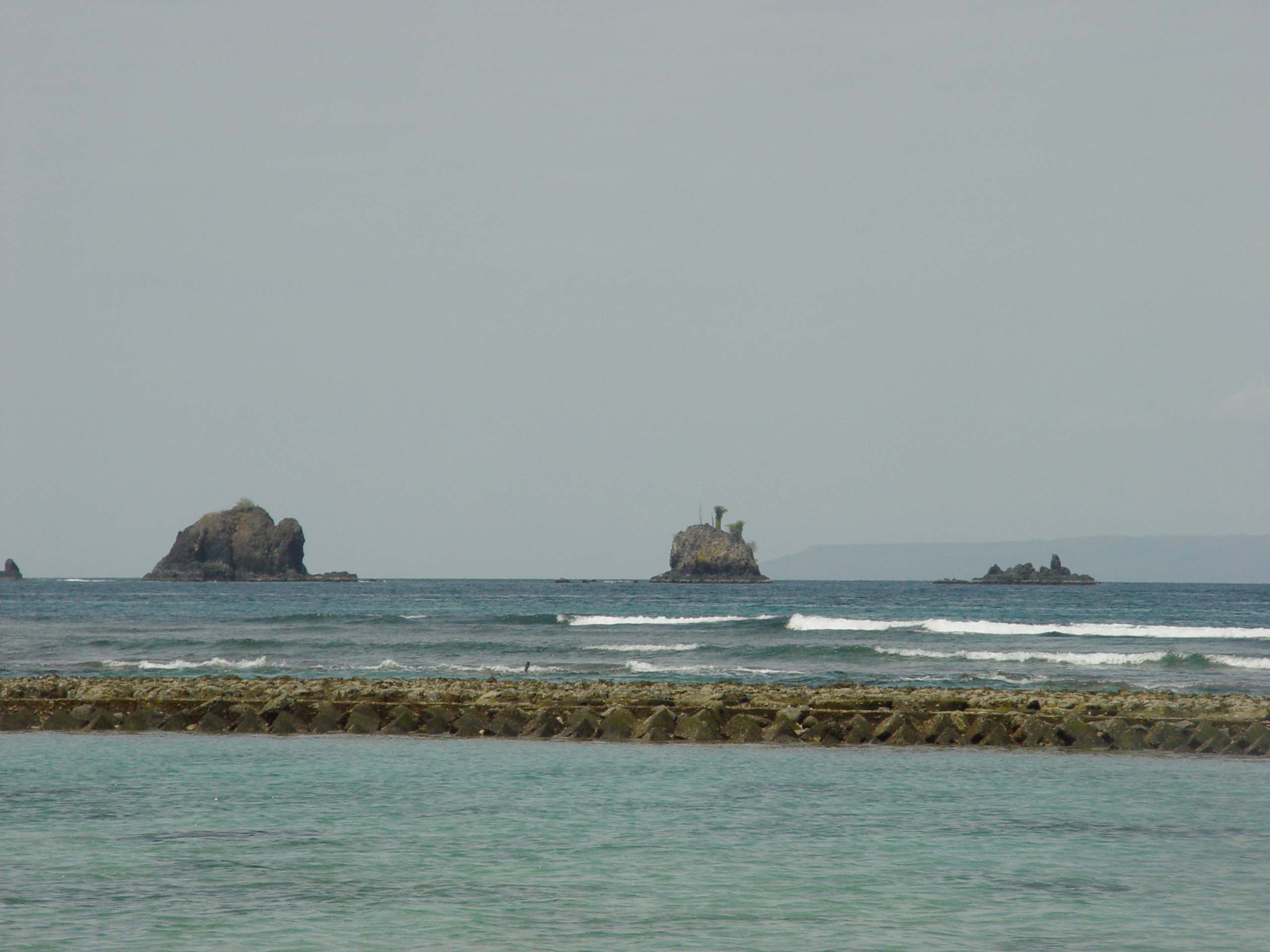
- A view across the lagoon to Gili Tepekong, Gili Biaha and Gili Mimpang, three uninhabited islets popular with divers and local fishermen.

- Location in Bali
- Coordinates: 8°30′0″S 115°34′0″E
- Country: Indonesia
- Province: Bali
- Time zone: UTC+8 (Central Indonesia Time)

Candi Dasa, or often Candidasa is a seaside town on the eastern cost of Bali that rests on the edge of a fresh water lagoon, named Candi Dasa Lagoon. The town is centred around Jalan Raya Candida, where a number of hotels, restaurants, and shops line the main road. It is popular tourist stop, attracting divers and those looking for a more sedate alternative to the busy, nightclub filled Kuta area or the large, manicured resorts at Nusa Dua.

== History ==
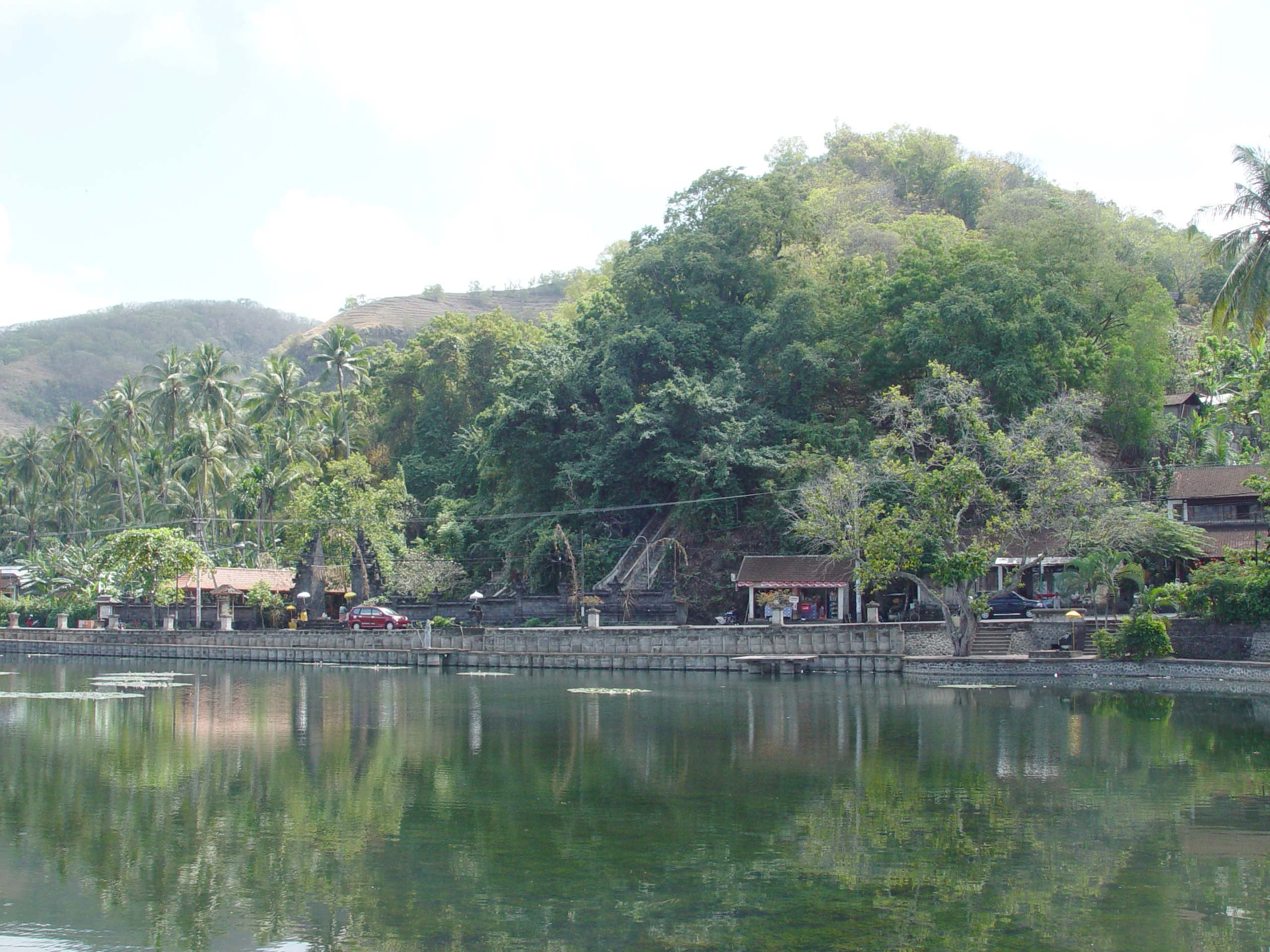
Temple and Lotus Lagoon.

Most sources say a fishing village was founded on the site by the 12th century and before the modern name of Candi Dasa was adopted it was known as both Teluk Kehen ("Bay of Fire") and Cilidasa. It is thought that the temple near the lagoon, with a statue of the fertility goddess Hariti surrounded by a group of children is the origin of the name cilidasa which translates from Balinese as "ten children". Many Balinese who want to have children go on pilgrimage to this temple to pray The modern name is thought to be a corruption of this older name.

The town began to catch on as a tourist destination in the 1970s. The diving and snorkeling in the area brought many tourists and the village began to grow; hotels, villas and restaurants popped up along the main strip. A period of stagnation followed, due to the loss of touristic assets from unsustainable practices (see "Beach erosion below"). Tourism picked up again in more recent years as per the general trend on the island, bringing atms, health clinics and mini marts. On top of good diving and snorkeling, the town provides easy access to other destinations in eastern Bali.

== Beach erosion ==
As tourism boomed in the 1970s and 1980s, Candidasa received a large amount of investment in tourism and a construction boom occurred. To fuel the construction of beach bungalows, new homes and restaurants, the offshore reef was mined for lime to make cement and other construction materials. This removed the coastal barrier that had protected the beach which was undermined and washed away.

During the 90's local hotel owners constructed a series of t-shaped groins jutting out into the water in an attempt to preserve the beach, with mixed results. Several government programs aim at stopping erosion, restoring the beaches and raising awareness of the importance of the reefs. In 2015-2016, a study suggested that the existing seawalls, groins and revetments be removed because of their deterioration, their material to be reused for new structures where possible.

Early 2017 four large floating platforms from concrete were placed in Candidasa's bay, possibly as an ill-advised attempt at reducing the pounding of the waves on the shore. Being badly anchored, these structures freed themselves within a few days of their installation and were repeatedly smashed against the rocks on the shore. The concrete broke up and loosened the polystyrene foam used to float the structures, resulting in the polystyrene invading the coast as far as Padang Bai.

=== Coral restoration ===
More efficiently, coral restoration is taking place since 2016 in the wake of similar work started in 1992 in Pemuteran bay by the "Reef Gardeners" of the Reef Seen Divers' Resort. Vincent Chalias started the first industrial coral farming in 2000. In 2016, with partner Manumudhita he founded the NGO "Ocean Gardener" which provides courses on coral reef restoration, and works on several sites in Bali and Nusa Penida - establishing coral nurseries, planting corals and installing "spiders". (Note: As of 2024, the NGO "Ocean Gardener" is working on five sites on Bali and two sites on Nusa Penida. On Bali: Kuku beach: direct planting and coralling; Tulamben beach: hard coral nursery, spiders and direct planting; Lipah beach: hard coral nursery, spiders and direct planting; Candidasa: hard coral nursery and spiders; Sanur beach: soft coral nursery and spiders; On Nusa Penida: Crystal bay: hard and soft coral nursery, rope planting; PED beach: rope nursery, rope planting and corraling; The 'spiders' are simple wiry structures anchored on the seabed. Corals use them as support to build up colonies.) In Candidasa they have set up a hard coral nursery and installed spiders.

== Marine protected area ==
In 2017 a large swath of the coast around Candidasa has become a Marine Protected Area, as part of the "Karangasem Bali Marine Conservation" area. This covers about 8 km of coastline on each side of Candidasa, from the north end of Virgin Beach to the east up to near the Crystal Beach Bali hotel to the west. The protected area extends at sea to include the little islets of Gili Tepekong and Gili Mimpang.

== Diving ==
Candidasa is a good spot for snorkeling and diving, notably around the three islands just of the coast: Gili Tepekong, Gili Mimpang and - a bit further south-east, Gili Biaha. Gili Mimpang includes three large rock formations and six smaller ones and is also known as Batu Tiga ("Three Rocks"). All three offer excellent diving, especially for more experienced divers. Currents can be quite strong and surprising, but most dive centres in and around Candidasa have experienced dive instructors and guides to lead the way.

A few dive sites are accessible from Candidasa by small traditional jukung boats. But there is no pier or other mooring for dive speedboats in Candidasa; diving operators moor their boats in Padangbai (11 km west) and take their clients there by private bus. Padangbai holds several excellent diving sites.

== In the area ==
The large Lotus Lagoon on the main road in Candidasa is a common place for photographs due to the natural beauty; it is known to be especially pretty at sunset.

Candidasa is a good base for explorations in East Bali. The Virgin Beach, also called Pantai Perasi (Perasi being the nearest village) or Pantai Pasir Putih (meaning white sand beach), a well known white sand beach in Bali, is 20 minutes east of town.
The village of Tenganan Pegringsingan, inhabited by Bali Aga people and one of the oldest villages in Bali, is 4 km north. Amlapura is 14 km north-east, with the nearby Ujung Water Palace 12 km away. Semarapura and its Klungkung Palace are 25 km west.

== Gallery ==
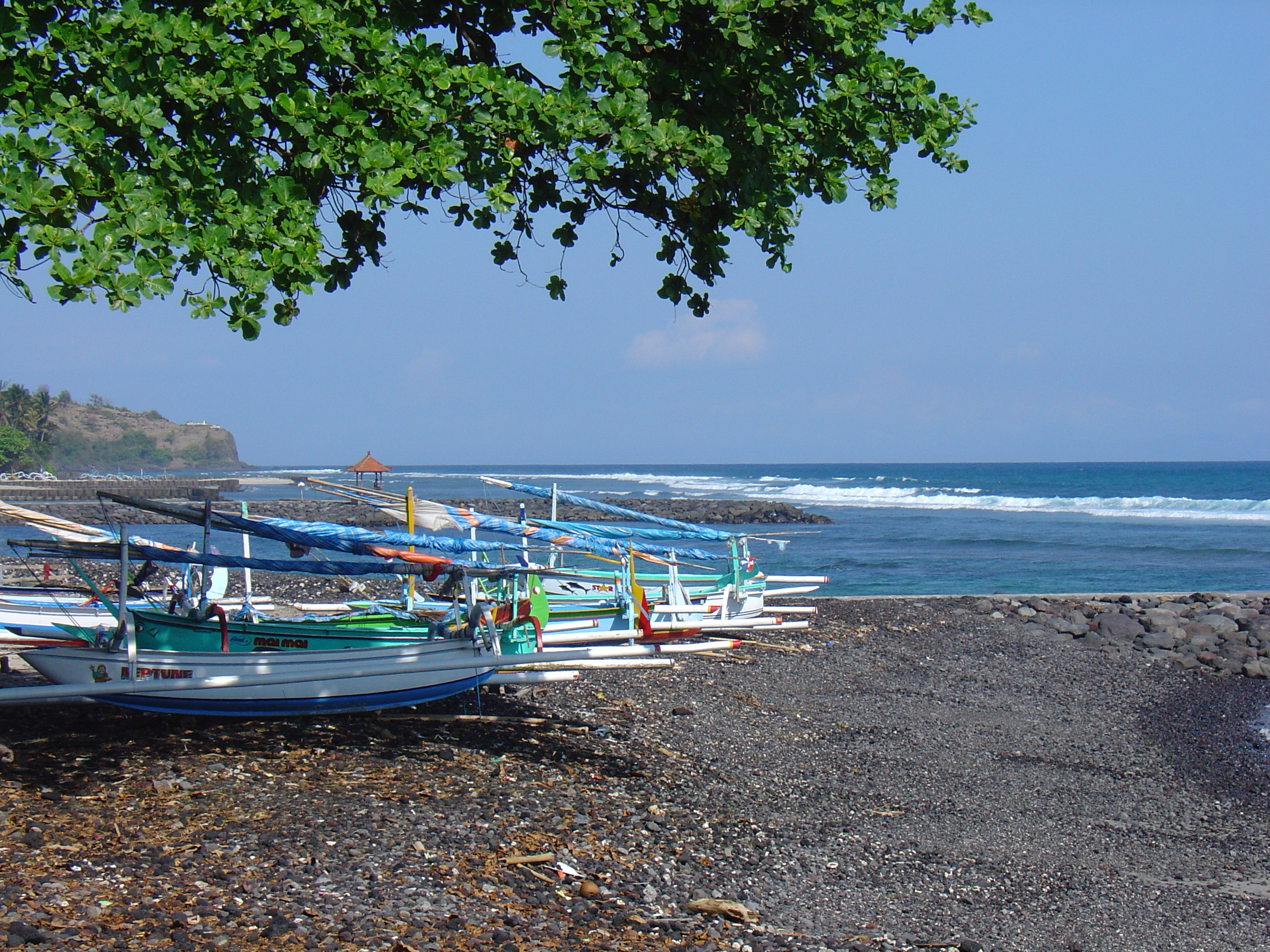
Fishing boats

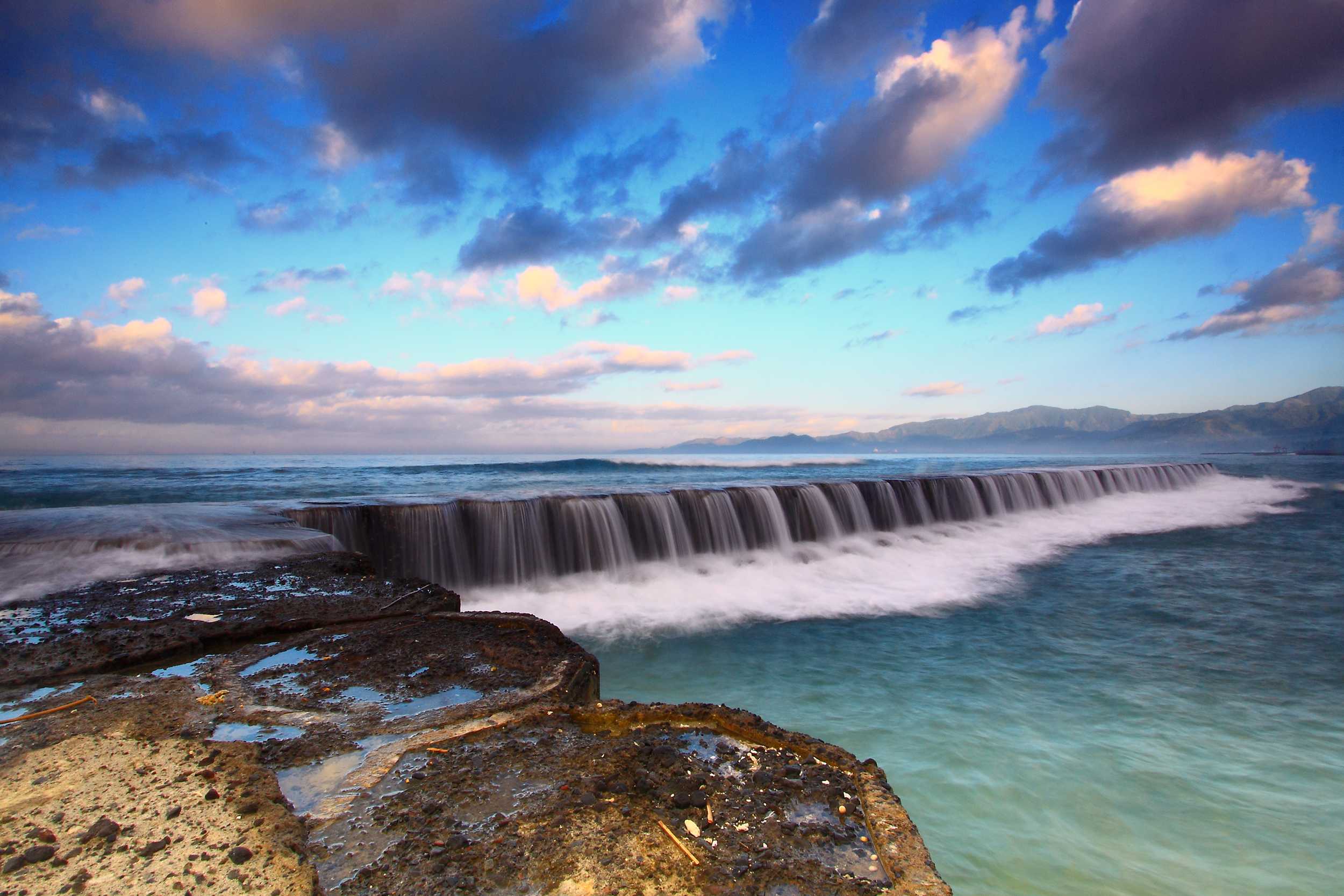
Wave-breaker

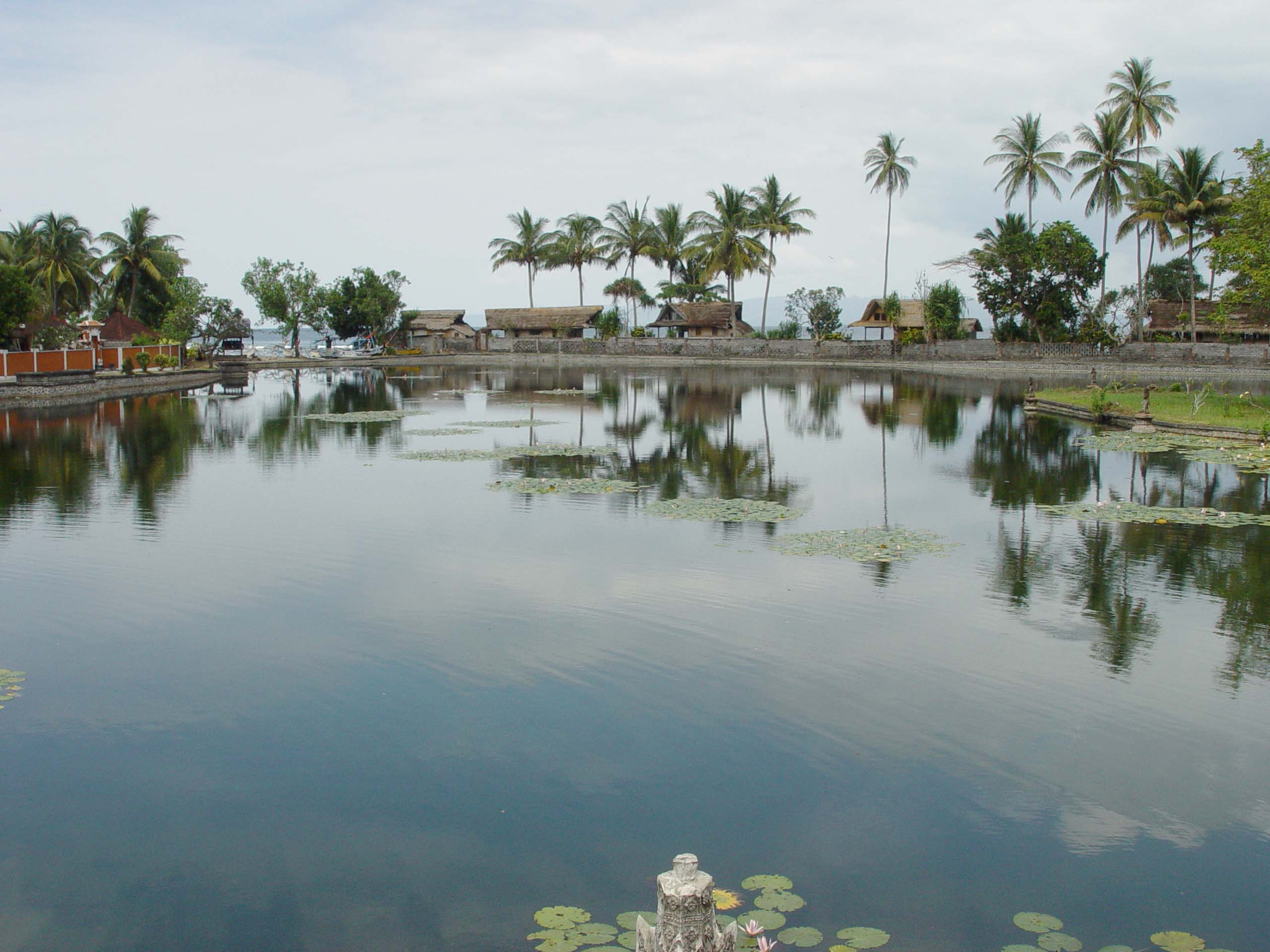
The Lotus lagoon
