= Pesanggaran =

- Location in Bali
- Coordinates: 8°43′S 115°12′E
- Country: Indonesia
- Province: Bali
- Time zone: UTC+8 (Central Indonesia Time)

Pesanggaran is a village in Bali in the Lesser Sunda Islands of Indonesia. It is located 3 miles (4.8 km) outside Kuta on the south coast of the island.

Nearby towns and villages include Denpasar (4.0 nm), Pabeansanur (2.8 nm), Sanur (2.8 nm), Serangan (1.1 nm) and Ujung (1.1 nm).
