= Jalan Legian =

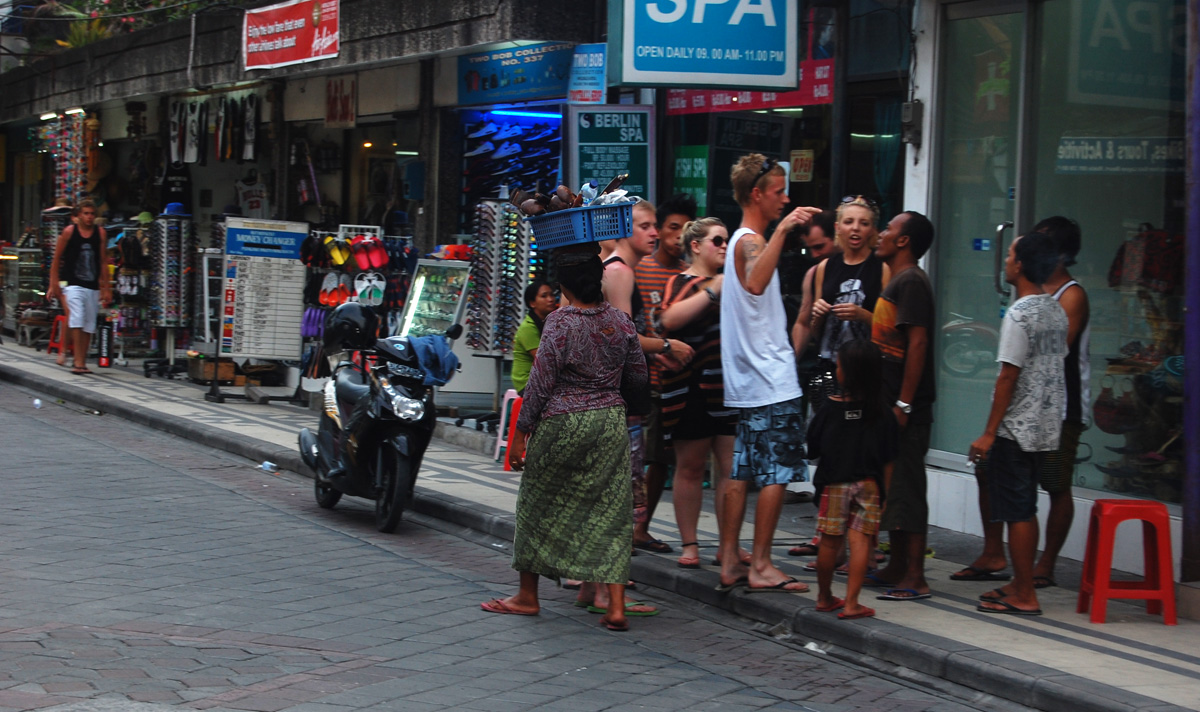
Jalan Legian

Legian Road or Jalan Legian is the main street that runs north–south from Kuta to Seminyak on the island of Bali in Indonesia. Legian Road contains a variety of shops, bars, hotels and dance clubs. Its proximity to the beach and its prominent night life make it host to thousands of tourists. Legian is well known for shopping and partying, with many areas offering traditional market shopping where shop owners are amenable to haggling and usually give shoppers an initial inflated price. Legian is one of the cheaper locations after dark and the road will begin to get busy at 11pm, peaking in traffic around 1 or 2 in the morning before easing down again around 4:30am. With such a cluster of hotels, shops and bars around Legian, the street can experience intense amounts of traffic. It can take up to 10 or 15 minutes to move forward 1 mile during some rush hours.

== Bombings ==
Just after 11pm on 12 October 2002, the popular tourist destination Paddy's Bar on Legian Road was subject to a suicide bombing. A memorial honoring the victims was built on Legian Road and dedicated two years after the attacks on 12 October 2004. The memorial is made of intricately carved stone and is lit up at night.
