= Canggu =

Canggu ᬘᬂᬕᬸ
- Village
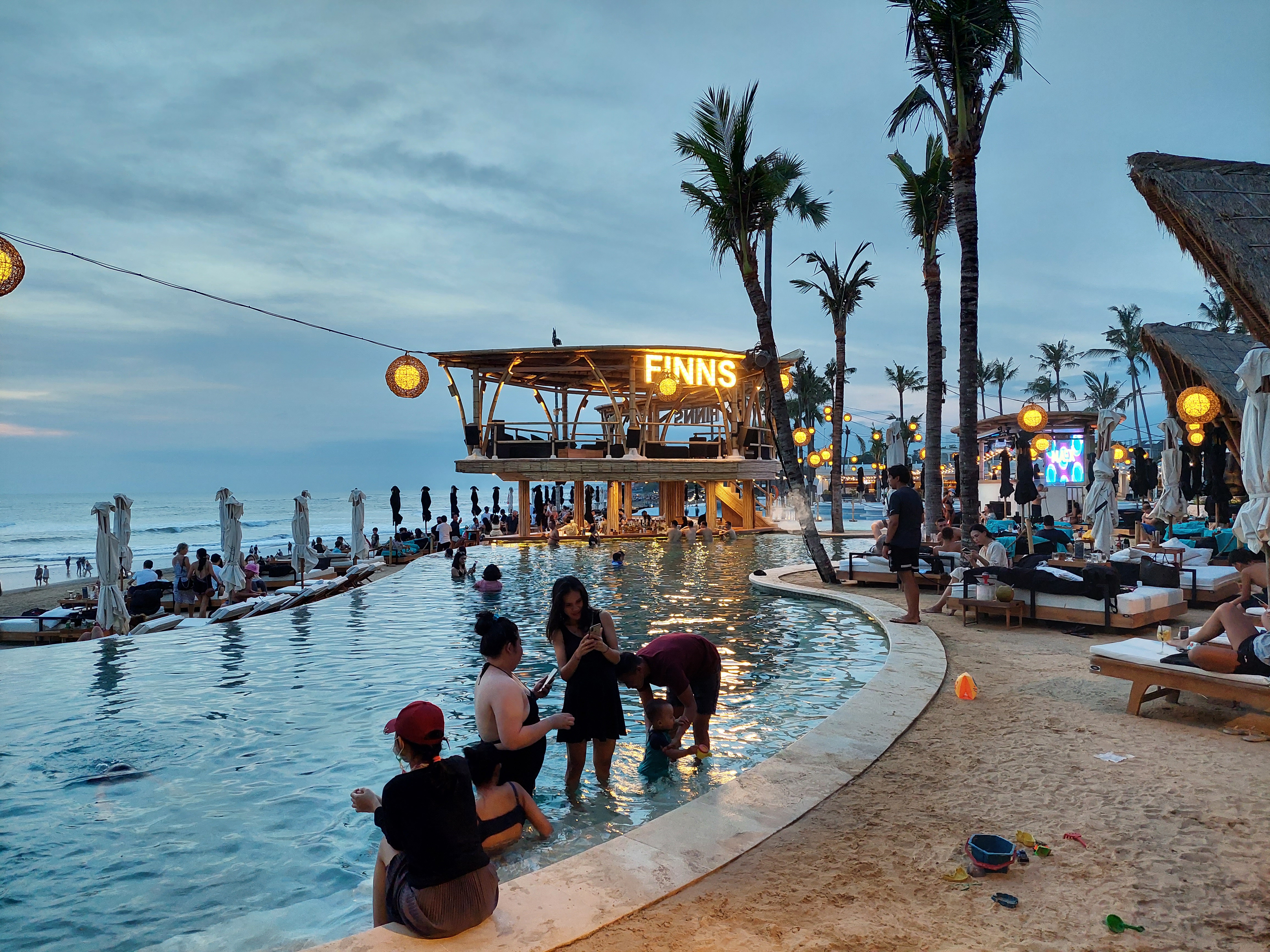
- Beach club in Canggu

- Location within Bali
- Coordinates: 8°39′21″S 115°08′3″E
- Country: Indonesia
- Province: Bali
- Regency: Badung

Area
  - Total: 5.23 km^{2} (2.02 sq mi)

Population (2016)
  - Total: 5,375

Canggu (Indonesian pronunciation: [ˈt͡ʃaŋɡu]) is a coastal village with a 10 km-long beach on the south-west coast of Bali, Indonesia.

== Location ==
Canggu is in North Kuta district, in Badung Regency. It lies approximately 10 kilometers north-west of Kuta and 12 km north-west of Denpasar.

== Main streets, temples and beaches ==
The main Canggu streets are Jalan Raya Canggu, Jalan Batu Bolong, Jalan Padang Linjong, Jalan Batu Mejan and Jalan Tanah Barak. Along Jalan Batu Bolong you find the Temple of the Dead, Pura Merajapati, and the Pipitan Cemetery. Along the beach there are two main temples, Pura Batu Bolong and Pura Batu Mejan, both hundreds of years old, built upon the initiative of Dang Hyang Nirartha.

Canggu has nine beaches that serve as its tourist magnets: Canggu Beach, Echo Beach, Batu Bolong Beach, Kayu Putih Beach, Pererenan Beach, Berawa Beach, Seseh Beach, Mengening Beach, and Nelayan Beach. Echo Beach (also known as Mejan Stone Beach) is the westernmost beach in Canggu just before Perenenan. Batu Bolong Beach is well known, situated next to a temple. At the end of the road are many bars and restaurants. The quieter Nelayan Beach is the last beach before Berawa Beach.

== Tourism and development ==
Tourism in Canggu started with Canggu village and the Canggu surf community jointly hosting an international surfing event in 1990. In those days, the Canggu area had scenic views of paddy fields and coconut groves. But after Kuta, Legian and Seminyak, Canggu has become one of the most popular destinations in Bali since the early 2020s. By 2024 Canggu was rapidly urbanising and development had replaced much of the rice fields, farmland and open space (Note: One of the reasons that bring farmers to sell their fields is that the land is taxed according to its saleable value. So all fields that stand next to a tourism development are hit with unaffordable land taxes set at the same value as that development - and are further impaired by the amount of water drained up for tourists. Another related problem is that most of Canggu is designated Green Belt, but this is largely ignored and development has continued unabated. The law states that no building should occupy more than 40% of any plot (the remaining 60% should be garden); but many count the swimming pool as "garden".) with private villas, hotels and diverse constructions aimed at tourists. As of 2023 about 324 hotels and other lodgings are registered in Canggu Village and high market brands have started moving in, such as Hugo Boss diversifying into the tourism industry by taking over a luxury rental villa in 2024. The number of restaurants and bars has increased sharply. Housing is increasingly built for the tourism investment market, for example the Las Casas and Blacksand villa projects.

In 2023 a proposed seven-storey resort on Seseh beach, in neighbouring Cemagi, drew a protest campaign and petition against its scale. The developer halted the project in September 2023 and consulted community leaders, and a revised, lower-rise design was agreed that November before construction began. The development was subsequently rebranded as an Anantara resort.

Water problem

Mass tourism industry has become the largest consumer of water, consuming 65% of freshwater in Bali and having lowered the island's water table by some 60%. Canggu is in North Badung, where 64% of households are connected to the water mains (piped water). But this piped water is very unreliable, in particular during the dry season; therefore all tourism-related venues (hotels, villas, restaurants, laundries, spas etc.), and many households, have wells with electric pumps (bored wells or sumur bor) even if they are connected to the piped water system; and nearly all these wells are 60 m deep, which means they are deep enough to bring salt water intrusion - and irreversible pollution but also a falling water table, land subsidence and deteriorating water quality. Hand dug wells, usually no more than 12 m deep, now dry up in season. In theory all commercial ventures must have a well permit, except for warung or little food stalls; but many large restaurants are now called warung (such as Warung Made, one of Bali's premier restaurants with several branches). Another handy misuse of vocabulary occurs with the word "villa", supposedly a private house and as such paying a lower premium for water than even a simple guest house; but the Bali Villa Association asserts that "Anything can be a villa", and that includes tourism accommodation with 70 rooms, each with their own swimming pools.

Another problem is that of coordination: the responsibility for clean water in Bali falls to eleven different government departments (in 2012), each of which represented at the three levels of the Indonesian government system: National, Provincial and Regency. This results in plenty of rules but nobody taking responsibility to enforce any of them. Moreover, each department competes with the others for ownership (and potential funds) of all projects, thus further impeding proper resources management.

Infrastructures inadequacy

The infrastructure was adequate for settlement activities, but has not followed the tourism development and cannot deal with the growth of tourism activities. Examples of this are the increased volume of waste generated by the rising number of visitors, leading to occasional waste pileups; or the roads, inadequate for the massive increase of tourism activities, with the consequence that the quality of the local road surfaces have deteriorated by 53.16% in 2023. Drainage provision for waste disposal is insufficient by 52.77% (in 2023). And waste infrastructure and facilities is 100% inadequate (in 2023). Seminyak's Petitenget Beach (next door to Canggu) and Canggu's Batu Bolong Beach seawaters were found contaminated with Escherichia coli in 2022.
For all these reasons, Canggu has made it to the list of "Slum and Blighted Areas in Badung Regency", with a decline in quality affecting 64.37 ha — the largest area experiencing such a decline.

Nearby Uluwatu has become the next tourism development target, with tourists splitting their visits between Canggu and Uluwatu.

Tourism revenue leakage

The increased number of accommodations brings higher regional revenue, Gross regional domestic product (PDRB), and some income for the local community But the local population mostly owns small businesses with low margins who face the strongest competition, such as budget accommodations and tour operators. The large proportion of ownership by outsiders, in conjunction with these outsiders owning the businesses with the highest profits, presents a significant source for financial leakage.

Increased costs of living

The cost of living has risen as a result of tourism, including housing, food, goods, and such services as healthcare.

Increased nuisances

This includes the aforementioned pollution, sewage problems etc. as exposed above. It also includes increased noise and population density. As a result, the condition of Canggu Village becomes less conducive for settlement purposes and, at the same time, for supporting tourism activities. Residents consider that such touristic area as Canggu is no longer a good place to raise a family: including and beyond the stated infrastructure problems, there is also that of alcohol abuse from tourists, which brings various troubles and a level of insecurity.

On culture

The locals feel that their own culture in Canggu had started to become influenced by tourists. There is also mention that religion and traditions are commercialised to earn money from tourists. In Canggu, where tourism is not based on local culture, the locals do not feel included in the tourism development process; this to be compared to Ubud, another rising tourism area but this one based mostly on local culture and where the locals have a more positive feeling towards tourism, due in part to that they feel more involved in the development process.

== Traffic ==
While traffic is quite heavy within Canggu, the main road (Jalan Raya Canggu) is notoriously jammed with traffic. In order to avoid going north-east to the main road, many riders choose to take the infamous Canggu-Berawa shortcut or Canggu shortcut (Jalan Anggrek), which connects Canggu to Seminyak. It is also often congested and restricted due to its narrowness, even though cars can only travel one way, from Canggu to Berawa.

== Surfing ==
Canggu has gained popularity among surfers as a longboard-friendly surf spot, one of the few on the island. Three main strips have developed for tourists - surfers and non-surfers alike. The spotlight on the area as a surf destination has been helped along by the presence of Deus Ex Machina's Bali outpost, the Deus Temple of Enthusiasm, and its annual contests that focus on classic single-fin long-boarding.

== Gallery ==
Canggu

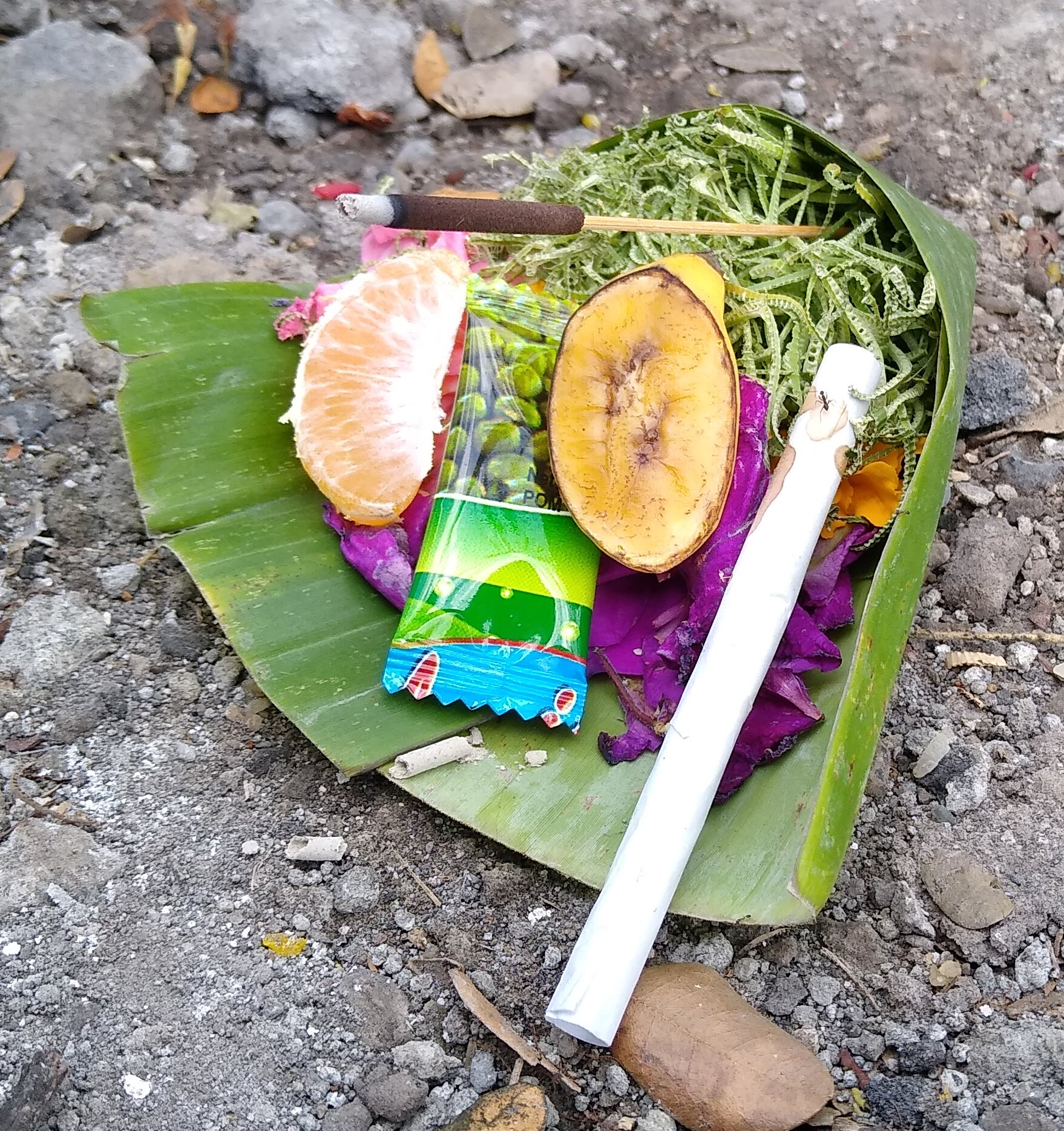
A canang sari

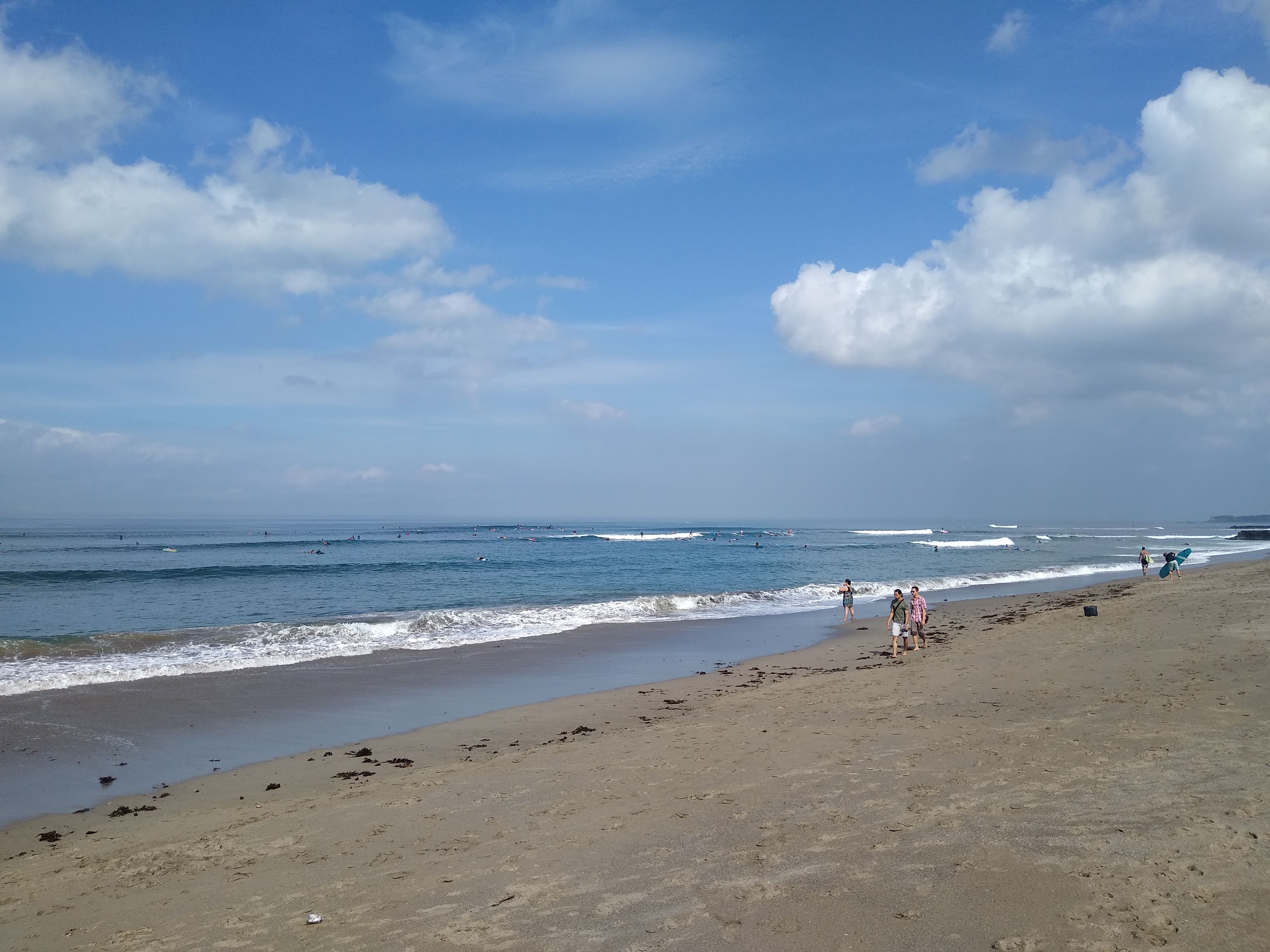
A beach

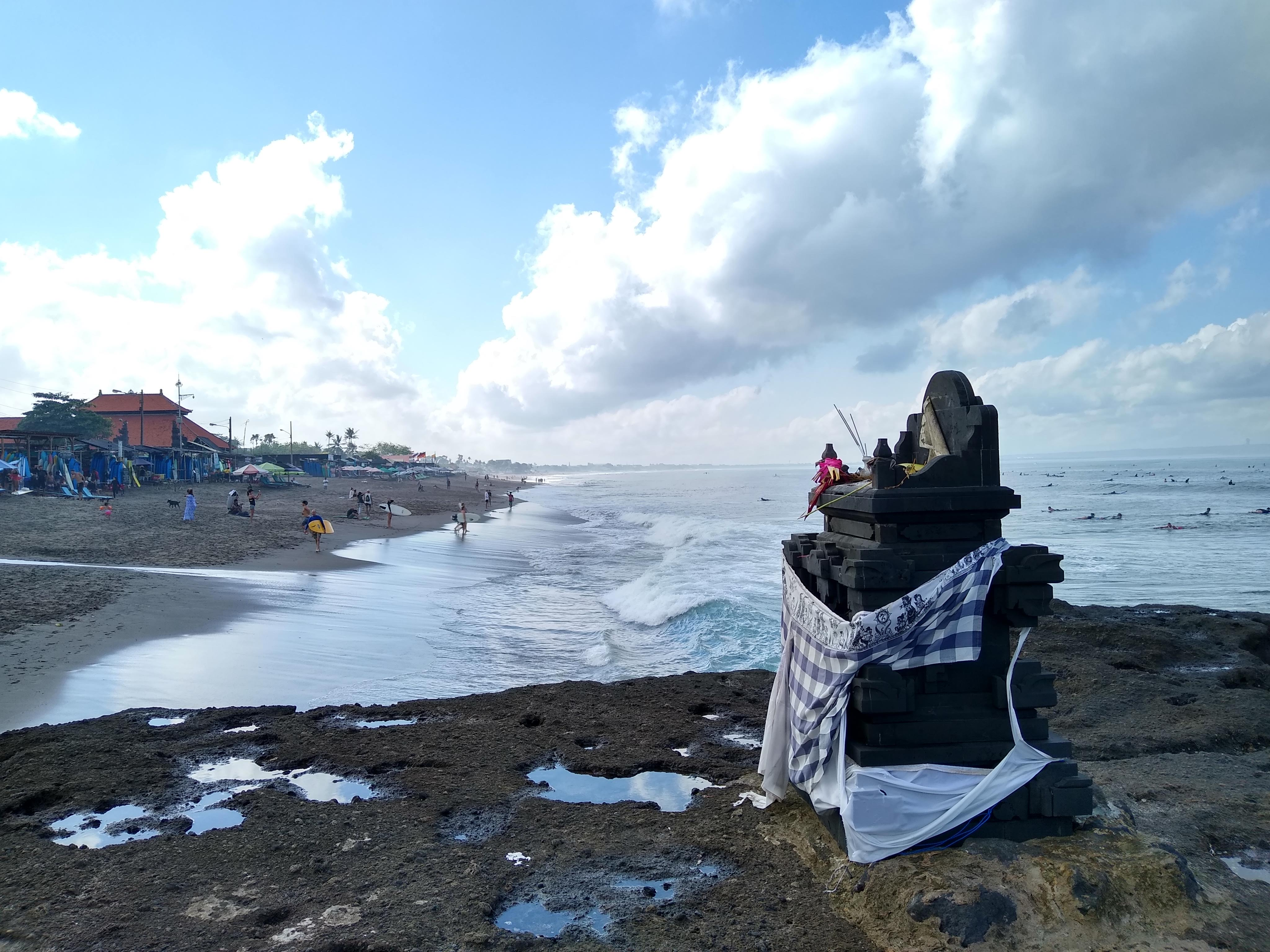
A beach

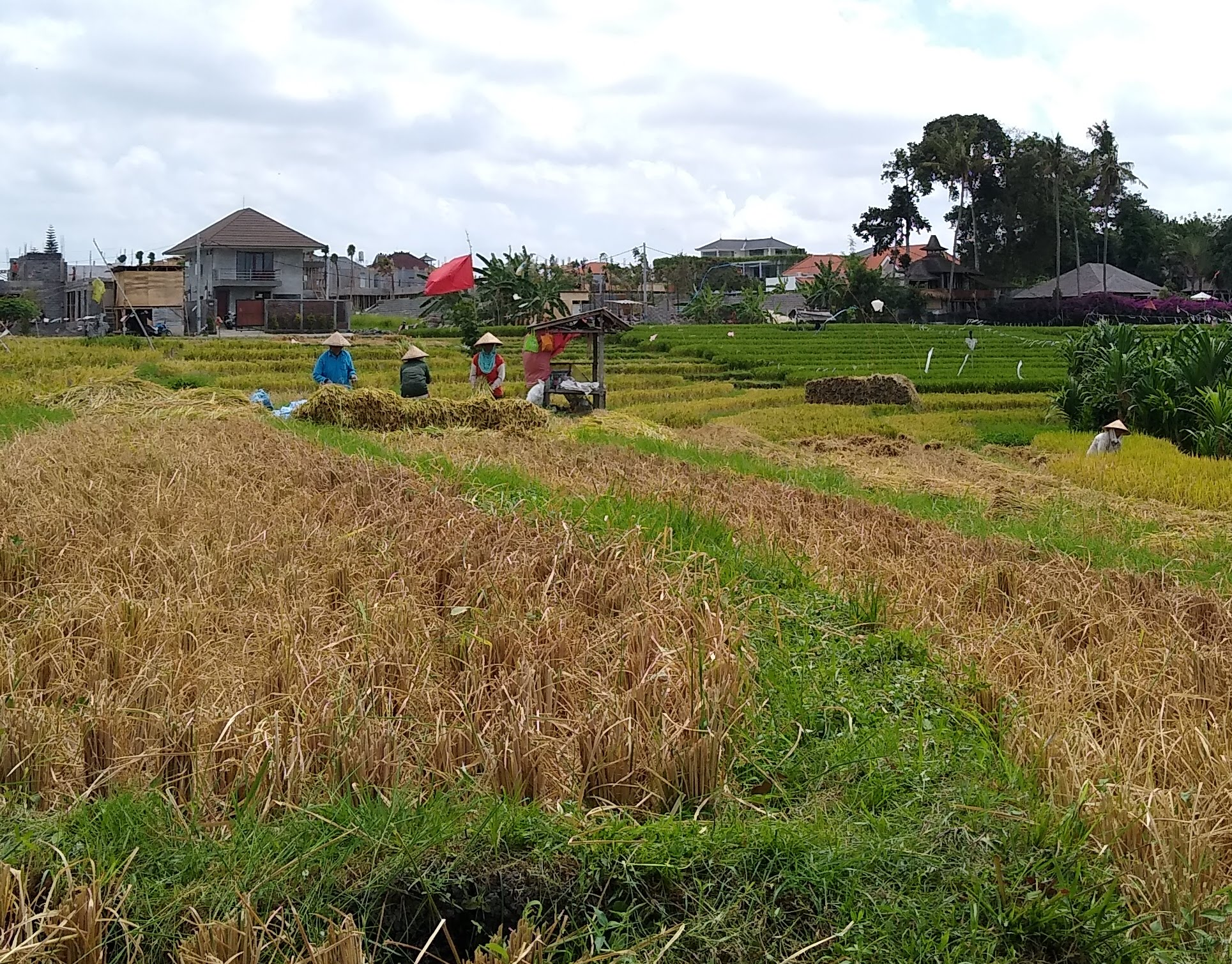
Harvesting rice (2019)

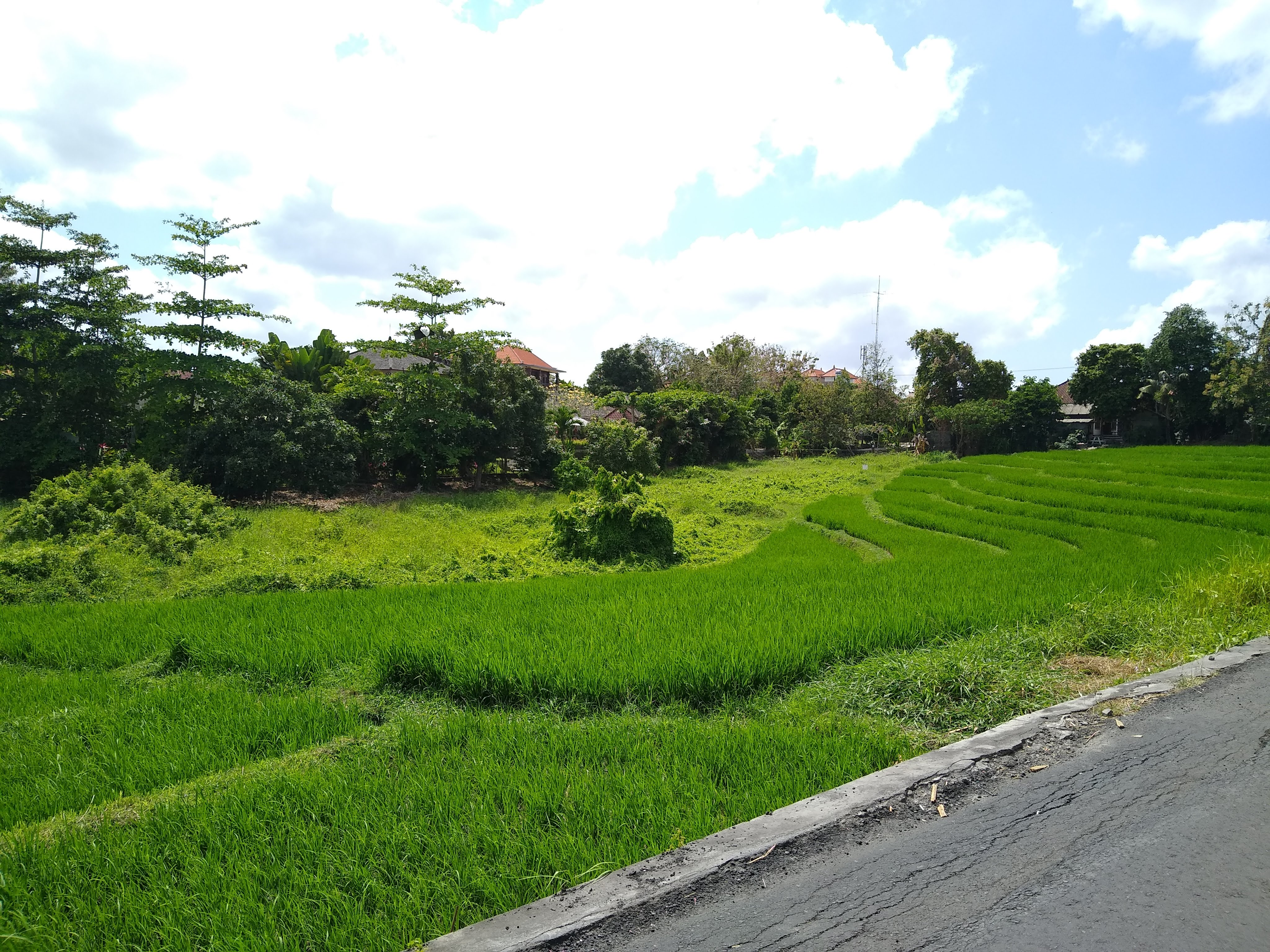
A terraced field (2019)

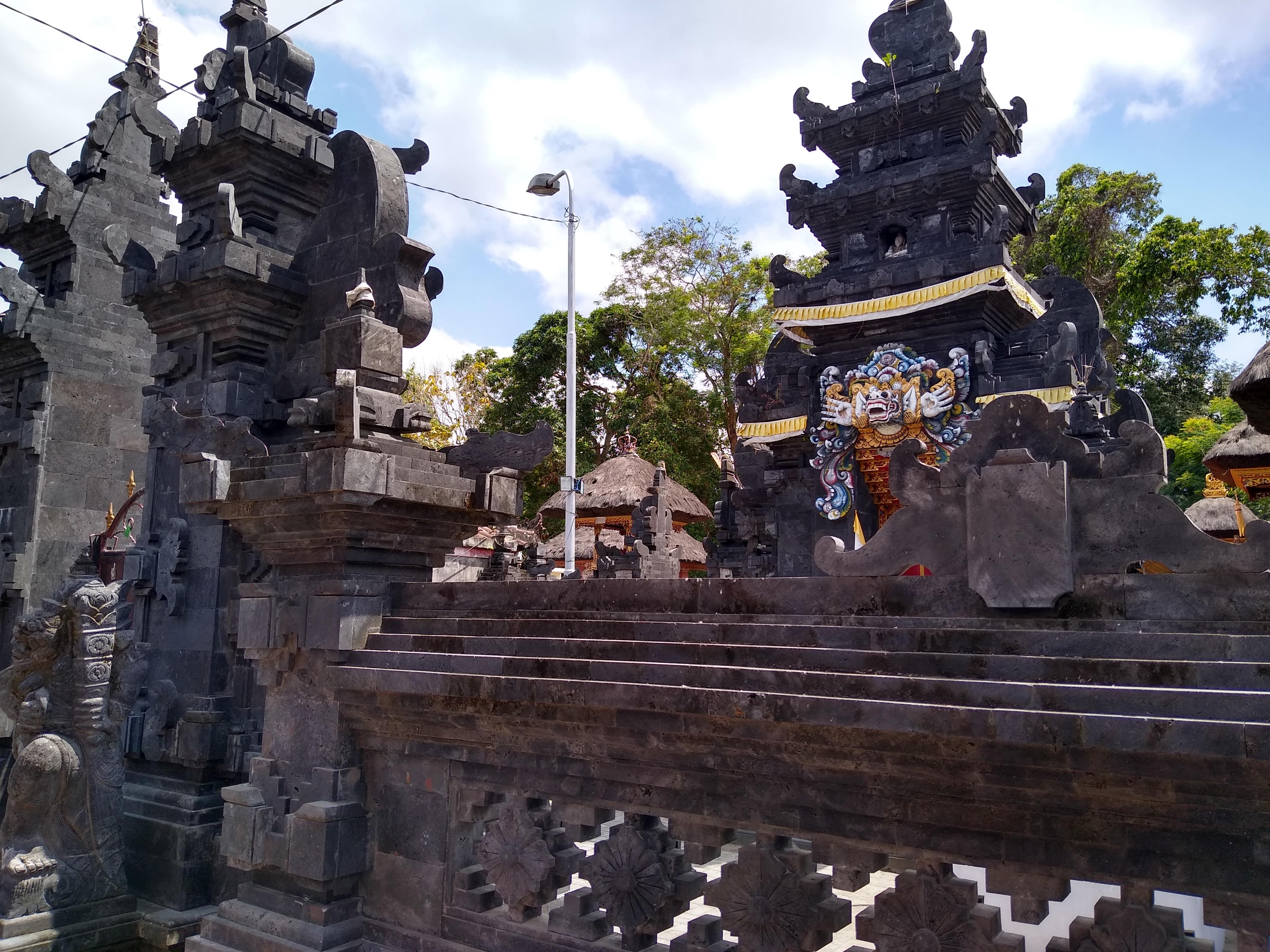
Pura Batu Mejan
