= Kuta, Bali =

Urban village and town in Indonesia

Kuta ᬓᬸᬢ/ᬓᬹᬝ (Balinese)
- Urban village and town
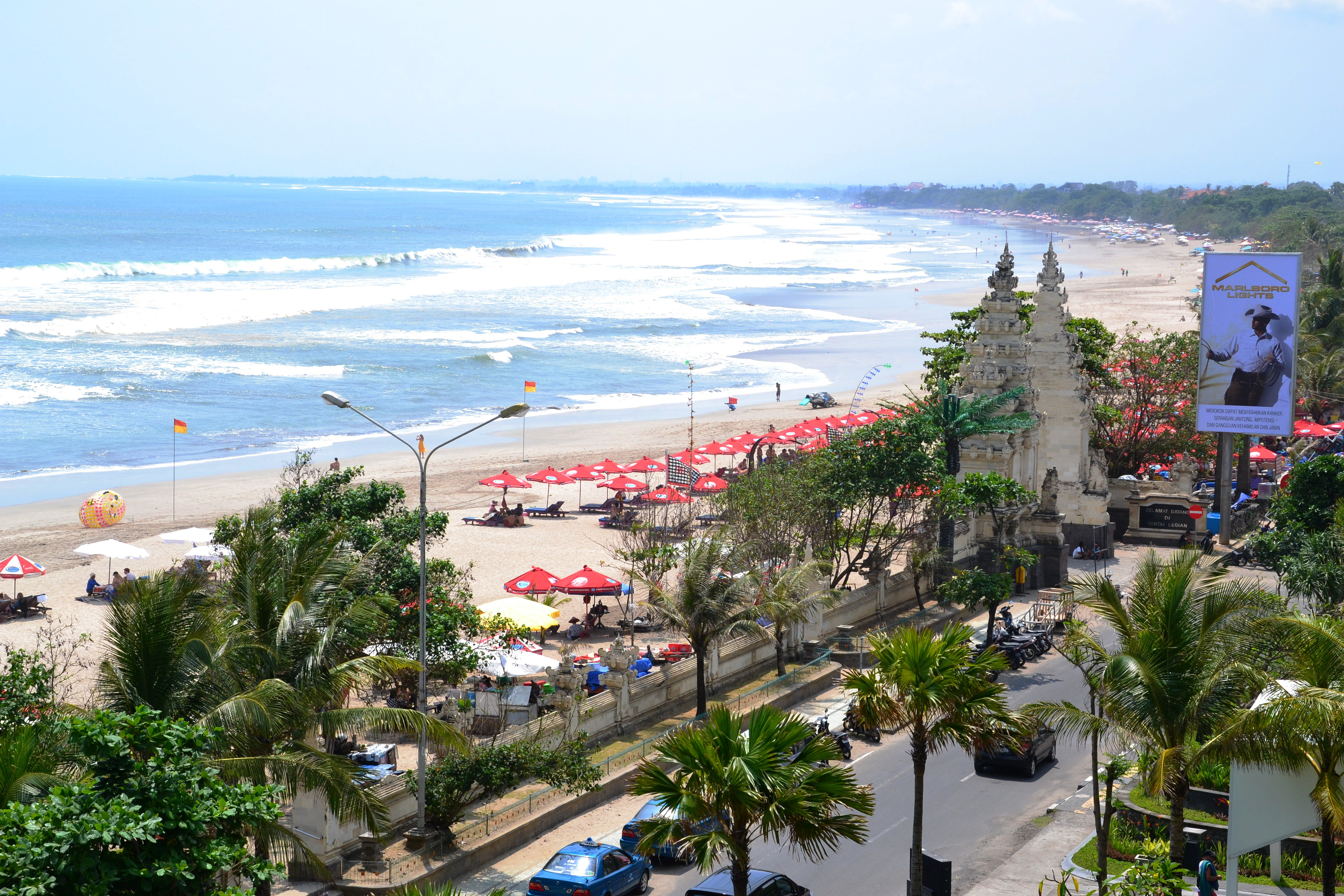
- Kuta Beach
- Interactive map of Kuta
- Location in Badung Regency and Indonesia Kuta (Indonesia)
- Coordinates: 8°44′S 115°10′E
- Country: Indonesia
- Province: Bali
- Regency: Badung
- District: Kuta
- Metropolitan area: Sarbagita

Area
  - Total: 2.79 sq mi (7.23 km^{2})

Population
  - Total: 37.902 (2,010)
  - Density: 13,580/sq mi (5,243/km^{2})

Kuta (Balinese: ᬓᬸᬢ/ᬓᬹᬝ) is a tourist area, administratively an urban village (kelurahan), and the capital of Kuta District, Badung Regency, southern Bali, Indonesia. Kuta is a part of the Denpasar metropolitan area, 12 km (7.5 mi) south of downtown Denpasar. Originally known as a fishing village, it was one of the first towns on Bali to see substantial tourism, and as a beach resort remains one of Indonesia's major tourist destinations. It is known internationally for its long sandy beach, varied accommodations, restaurants and bars, and many renowned surfers who visit from Australia. It is near Bali's Ngurah Rai Airport.

The Balinese Provincial Government has taken the view that the preservation of the Balinese culture, natural resources, and wildlife are of primary importance in the island's development. To this end, it has limited tourist development to the peninsula on the island's extreme southern aspect; Kuta beach is on this peninsula's western side and Sanur is on the east. To the north of the peninsula no new tourist development is supposedly permitted.

To the south, Kuta Beach extends beyond the airport into Jimbaran. Other nearby towns and villages include Seseh (6.4 nm), Denpasar (4.5 nm), Ujung (1.8 nm), Pesanggaran (2.0 nm), Kedonganan (2.9 nm), and Tuban (1.0 nm).

== Administration ==
Map of Kuta

Badung Regency includes three districts with the name of Kuta:

- Kuta District (Kecamatan Kuta), which covers the villages of Kuta, Legian, Seminyak, Kedonganan, and Tuban. Kuta, Legian and Seminyak form a conurbation along the western side of the isthmus linking the Nusa Dua peninsula to the rest of Bali.
- South Kuta District (Kecamatan Kuta Selatan; includes Jimbaran and the whole of the Nusa Dua peninsula).
- North Kuta District (Kecamatan Kuta Utara; includes villages of Kerobokan Kelod, Kerobokan, Kerobokan Kaja, Tibubeneng, Canggu, and Dalung).

Kuta is now the center of an extensive tourist-oriented urban area that merges into the neighboring towns. Legian, to the north, is the commercial hub of Kuta and the site of many restaurants and entertainment spots. Most of the area's big beachfront hotels are in the southern section of Tuban.

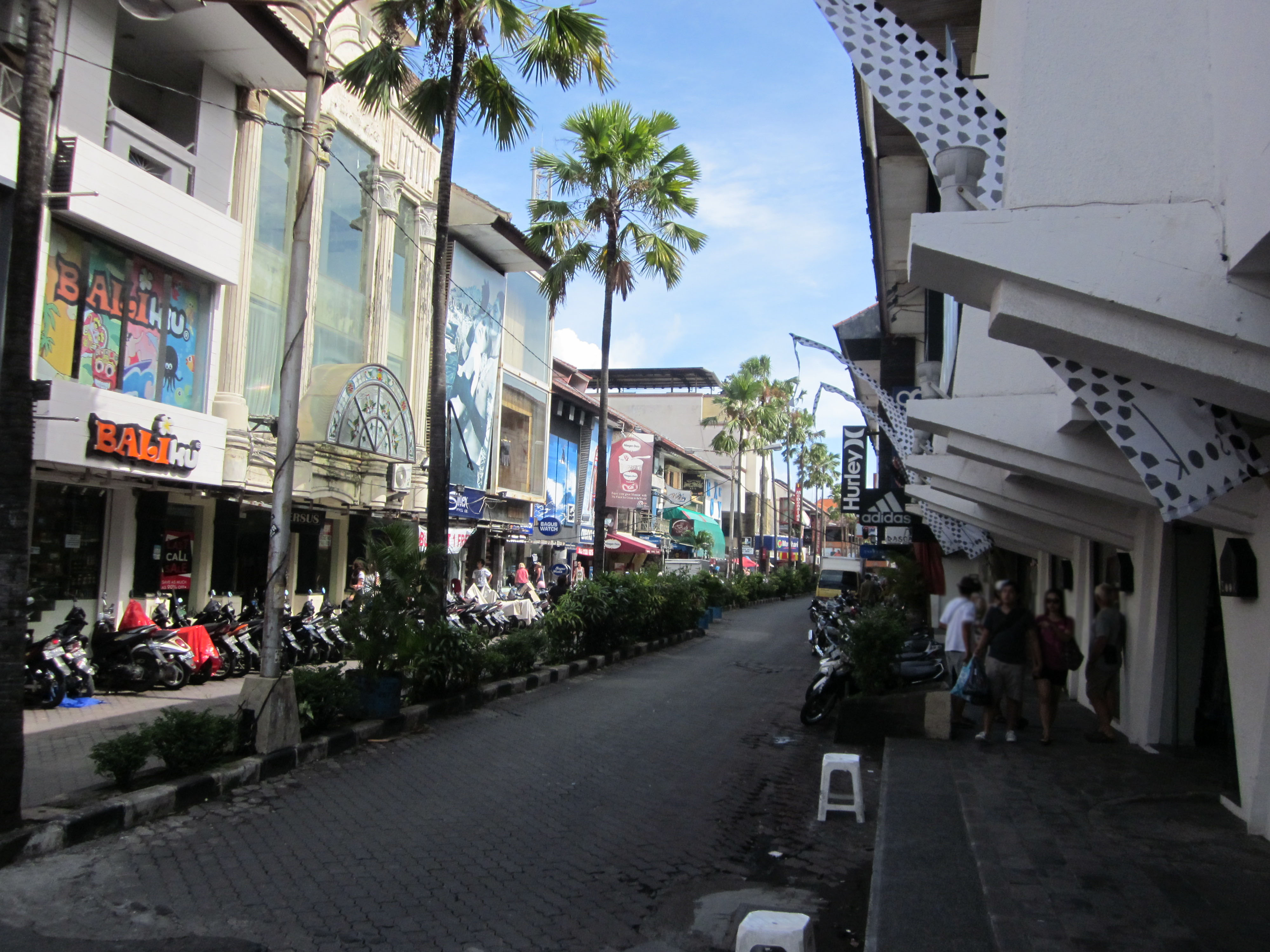
Kuta Square

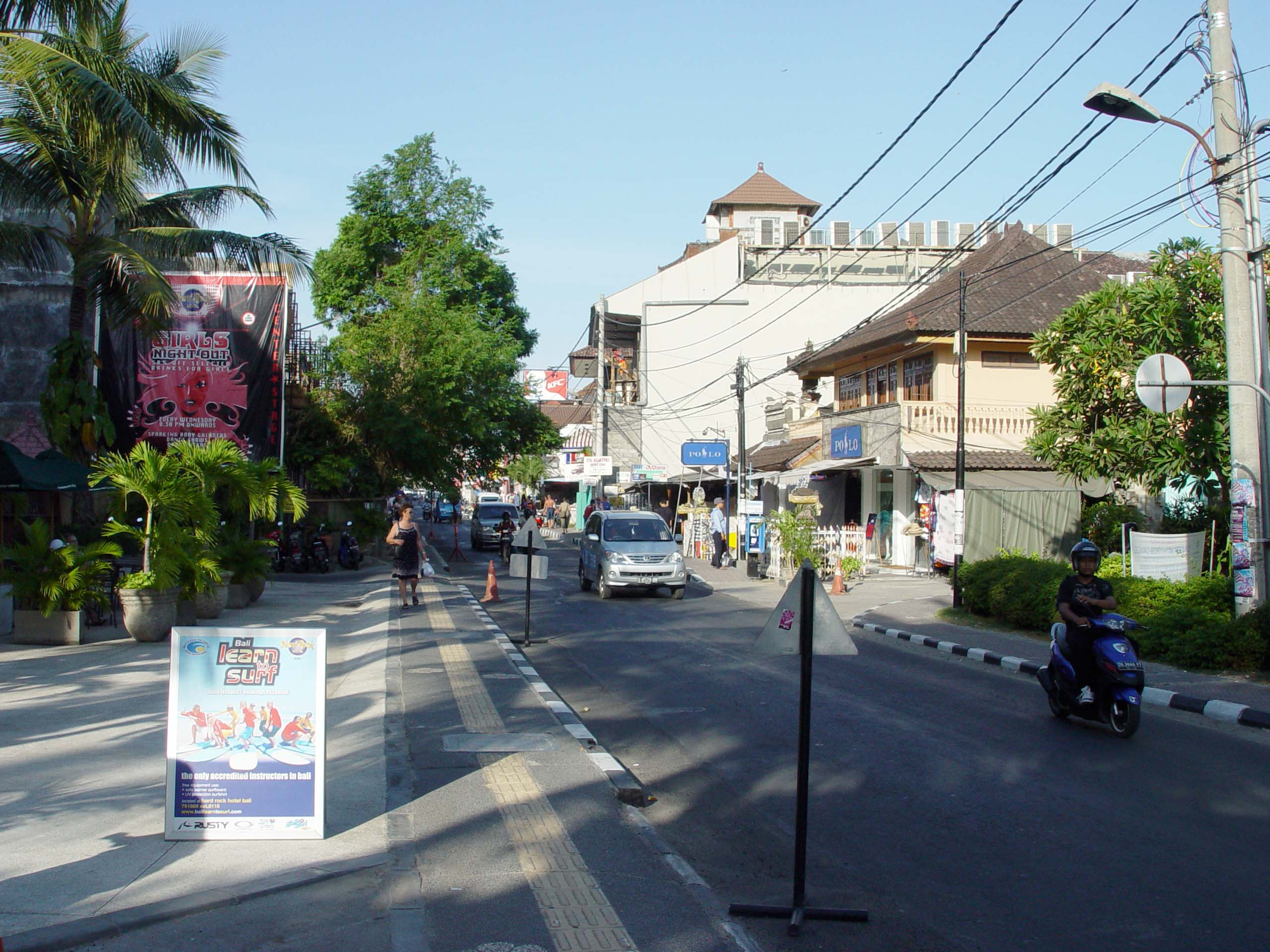
Kuta Main Street

Legian and Seminyak are northern extensions of Kuta along Jl. Legian and Jl. Basangkasa. They are somewhat quieter suburbs with cottage-style accommodations, where many of the expat crowd live. Also to the north are Petitenget, Berawa, Canggu, and Seseh — new and quieter continuations of Kuta's beach. They are easy to reach through Abian Timbul or Denpasar and Kerobokan. Several large hotels are located in this area: the Oberoi Bali, Template:Multiple imageHard Rock Hotel Bali, the Intan Bali Village, the Legian Bali in Petitenget, the Dewata Beach, and the Bali Sani Suites in Berawa.

== History ==
In its early history, Kuta was a small fishing village. As Kuta, specifically Kuta beach, became increasingly popular among Western visitors in the 1930s, the village began to grow. In the 1960s, Kuta became a popular destination for tourists and surfers due to good wave conditions. Kuta continued to grow in the 1970s, with hotels, souvenir shops, and restaurants opening in response to increasing tourism.

=== 2002 bombings ===
On 12 October 2002, Kuta was the site of two bombings carried out by Jemaah Islamiyah suicide bombers, a violent Islamist group. At 11:05 p.m., a suicide bomber detonated a bomb inside his backpack at the nightclub Paddy's Pub, injuring many. Around 20 seconds later, a more explosive car bomb was detonated in a white Mitsubishi van in the bar Sari Club, opposite Paddy's Pub on Legian Street.

The heavily populated residential and commercial district sustained substantial damage, with a crater one meter (3.3 feet) deep created by the car bomb. There were 202 fatalities and 209 injuries.

== Bali bombing memorial ==
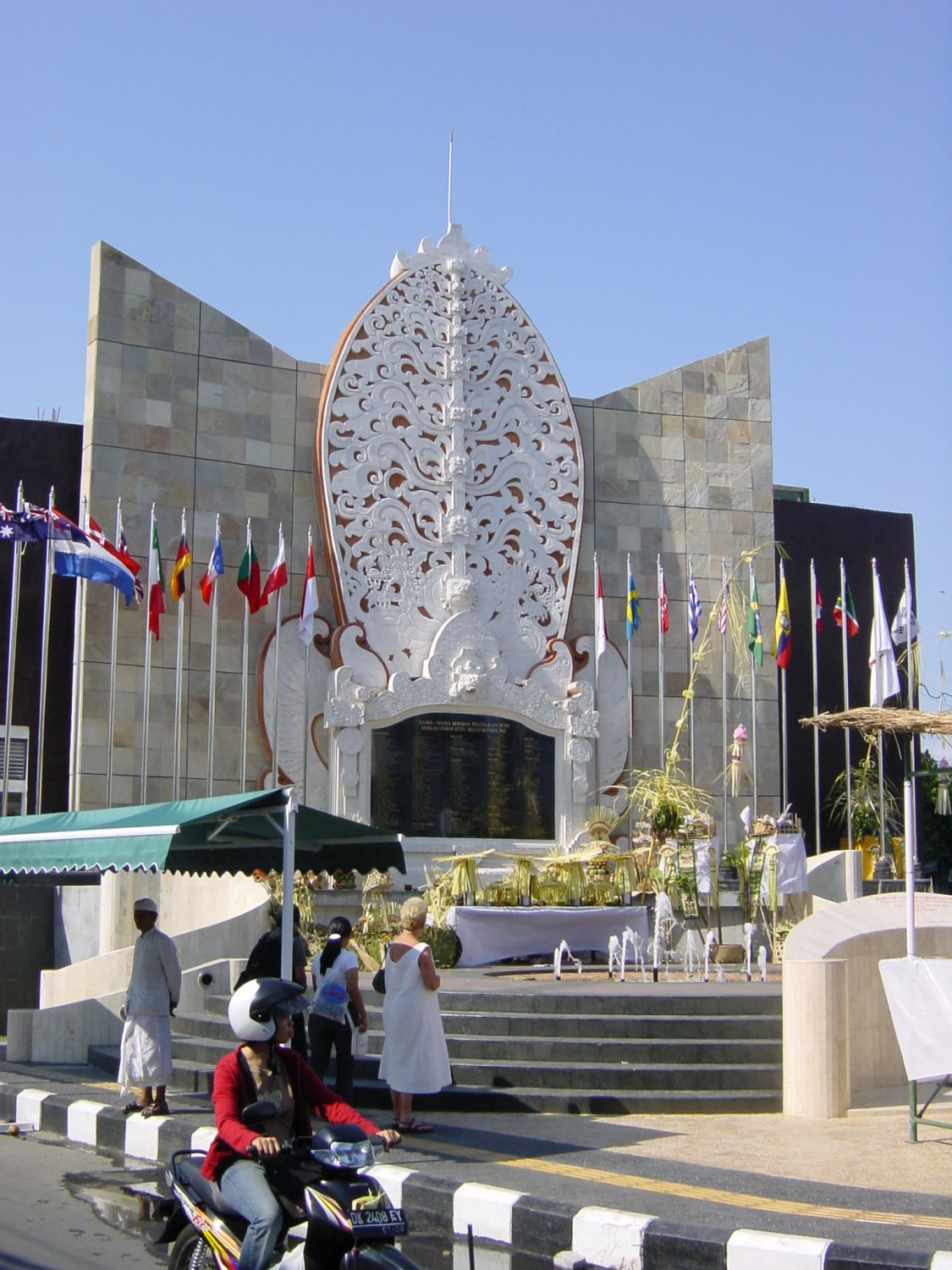
The Bali bombing memorial

After the Bali bombings in 2002 at Kuta, which killed 202 people including 88 Australians, a permanent memorial was built on the site of the destroyed Paddy's Pub on Legian Street. (A new bar, named "Paddy's: Reloaded", was reopened further along Legian Street). The memorial is made of intricately carved stone, set with a large marble plaque, which bears the names and nationalities of each of those killed. It is flanked by the national flags of the victims. The monument is well-maintained and illuminated at night.

The memorial was dedicated on 12 October 2004, the second anniversary of the attack. The dedication included a Balinese Hindu ceremony and the opportunity for mourners to lay flowers and other offerings. The Australian ambassador and Indonesian officials attended the ceremony as most of the victims were Australian.

== Kuta Beach ==
The beach has been notable since the early 1970s. Kuta (koo-tah) beach is also known as Sunset Beach, as opposed to the Sunrise Beach, another name for Sanur Beach. Luxury resorts, restaurants, and clubs are located along the beach.

In 2011, a two-metre-high white sandstone fence, built in a Balinese architecture style, was built along the road to block the sand from blowing to the cafes and restaurants. The project cost Rp. 4 billion (US$255,000). Some tourists dislike it as it is considered to be blocking the beach view, while others believe the wall helps dampen the sounds from the congested traffic on the adjacent street. Together Kuta Beach is 2.5km long. To make the beach cleaner, as of late August 2011, vendors are prohibited from selling food on the beach, but they are still allowed to sell beverages and souvenirs.

The annual monsoon season in the region often results in trash and plastic waste washing up on the shore. Locals and tourists volunteer to clean the waste.

== Tourism ==
Kuta is well known in Bali for being a cheap tourist destination for Australians due to its close proximity. Kuta Beach is popular among surfers due to consistent and good wave conditions. Kuta Beach is also near the airport.

== Popular culture ==
Kuta is mentioned in "I've Been To Bali Too", the single by Australian folk-rock band Redgum from their 1984 album Frontline. It is also home to an Indonesian punk rock band Superman Is Dead, most famous for its English song "Kuta Rock City". Kuta is mentioned in Iwan Fals' arena-ballad song "Mata Dewa" (deity's eyes), which the first verse of the song goes "di atas pasir senja pantai Kuta" (on the sand of the Kuta beach's twilight).

== See also ==
- Jalan Legian
- Jimbaran
- New Kuta Beach
- Seminyak
- List of beaches in Indonesia
