= Padangbai =

- Location in Bali
- Coordinates: 8°31′S 115°30′E
- Country: Indonesia
- Province: Bali
- Time zone: UTC+8 (Central Indonesia Time)
- 80871: 80871

Padangbai is a small coastal town in the Karangasem Regency, in south-eastern Bali, Indonesia. It serves as a ferry port for travel to Lembar on Lombok, The Gilis and other Lesser Sunda Islands.

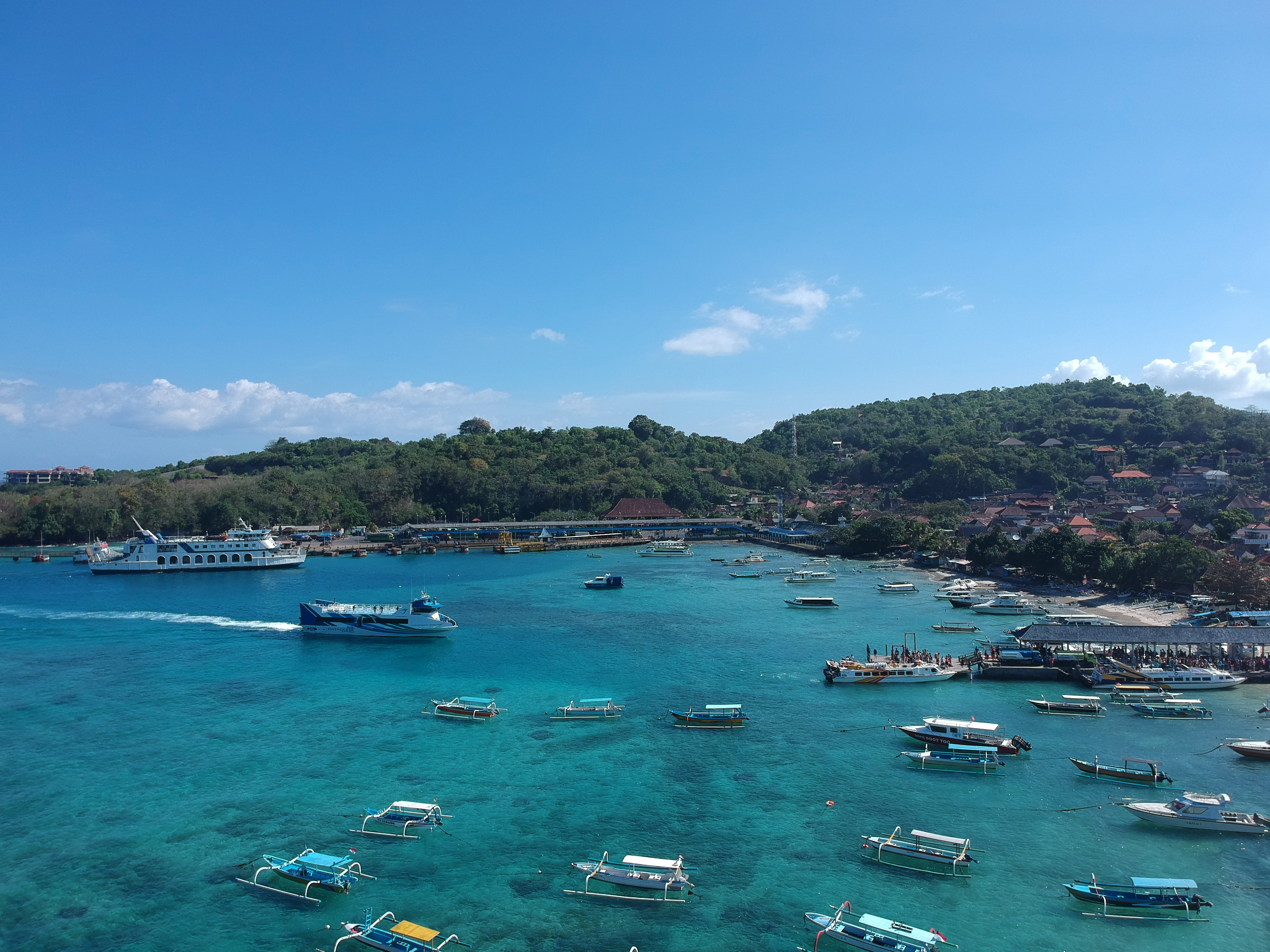
The port: main harbour at the back, landing jetty for the fast boats on the right.

== Location ==
Padang Bai is in Manggis District, off the road that follows the south-east coast of Bali. It sits 35 miles (56 km) north-east of Denpasar Airport (1 hour 19 minutes drive in fluid traffic), 27 miles (43 km) north-east of Sanur Beach (1 hour fluid drive), 23 miles (37 km) east of Ubud (some 62 minutes fluid drive), 8 miles (13 km) west of Candidasa, and 11 miles (18 km) east of Semarapura.

== Notable places ==
=== Beaches and diving ===
Padangbai includes four beaches and several diving spots, in particular the Blue Lagoon sites which have become part of a Marine Protected Area in 2017 along with Bias Tugal Beach. Most of them require particular attention to the currents: these can become strong during tide change and at the new moon.

As there is no pier or other mooring for dive speedboats in Candidasa, diving operators moor their boats in Padangbai and bring their clients in by private bus.

Main Beach

Immediately East of the port, this long narrow beach is bordered by the main street, Jl. Silayukti.
Diving: the Ferry Channel site is near the green beacon that marks the starboard side of the narrow channel used by the ferries for Lombok. It features several horizontal steps, with some overhangs that create shallow crevices of various heights and good hideout places for a diverse fauna. This site goes down 30 metres and more.

Blue Lagoon Beach

Also known as Padang Kurungan or Padang Bai Beach.
Diving: there are 6 different sites, suitable from beginners (mild to moderate currents) to professional divers, very diverse. The shallow coastal reef has a maximum depth of 25 metres with a slope and a short wall. The visibility is around 25 metres or more. Here are some of the sites:
The Temple site is a shallow (5 to 9 metres) in front of the small temple built into the lava cliffs. It is rather well protected from the currents. Beyond the sand, the reef edge follows along the sandy slope to a depth of 24 metres.
The Tanjung Sari site is at the southern end of the Blue Lagoon, stretching along the cape that separates the Blue Lagoon from the Padang Bai harbour. It features a protruding reef top with volcanic rock formations, which slopes down to about 30 metres and ends in a sandy bottom.
The Drop Off site is at the junction of the Blue Lagoon and the Amuk bay to the northeast. It is a rocky cape that continues under water as a vertical wall, down to a depth of 30 metres.
The Jepun or Tanjun Jepun site is on the west coast of Amuk Bay, northeast of the Blue Lagoon. There is an artificial reef with a small shipwreck, sunk on purpose in 2008 at 18 meters depth, and some Buddha statues.

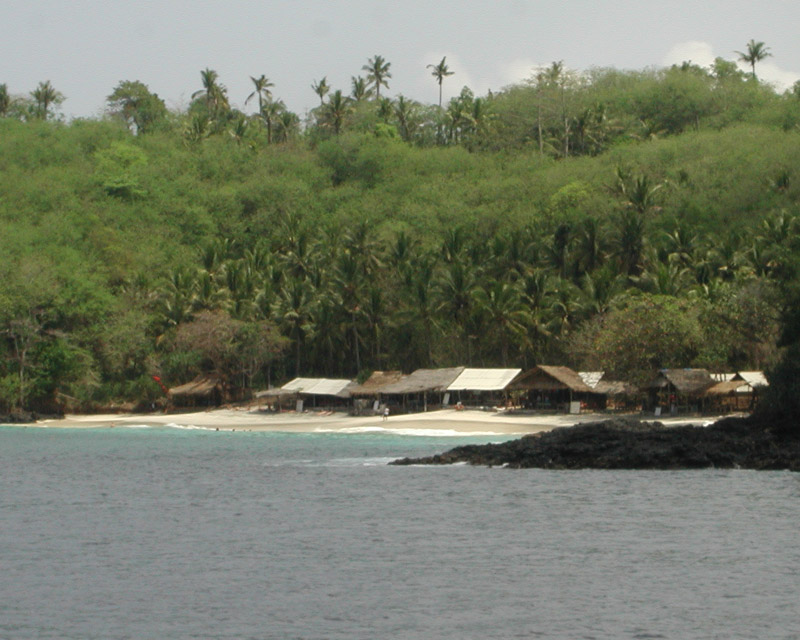
Bias Tugal Beach

Bias Tugal Beach

Also known as Pantai Kecil, Little Beach, Secret Beach or White Sand Beach, it is close to the market - but reaching it means a 1.4 km detour by road. It is about 130 m long. The name means 'Separated Sand' (bias for 'sand', tugal for 'cut', 'separation'), because this is where the volcanic black sand beaches of the south-east coast gives room to pure white sand.
Diving: The entire bay has a flat bottom (9 metres) covered with soft coral and several boulders bearing hard coral. At about 50 metres from the beach, the seafloor makes a 45 degree angle sloping down, with a horizontal ledge at 20 metres.

Black Sand Beach

Also known as Mimba Beach, Black Pearl Sand Beach or Kusamba Beach. Salt mining operation.

=== Temples ===
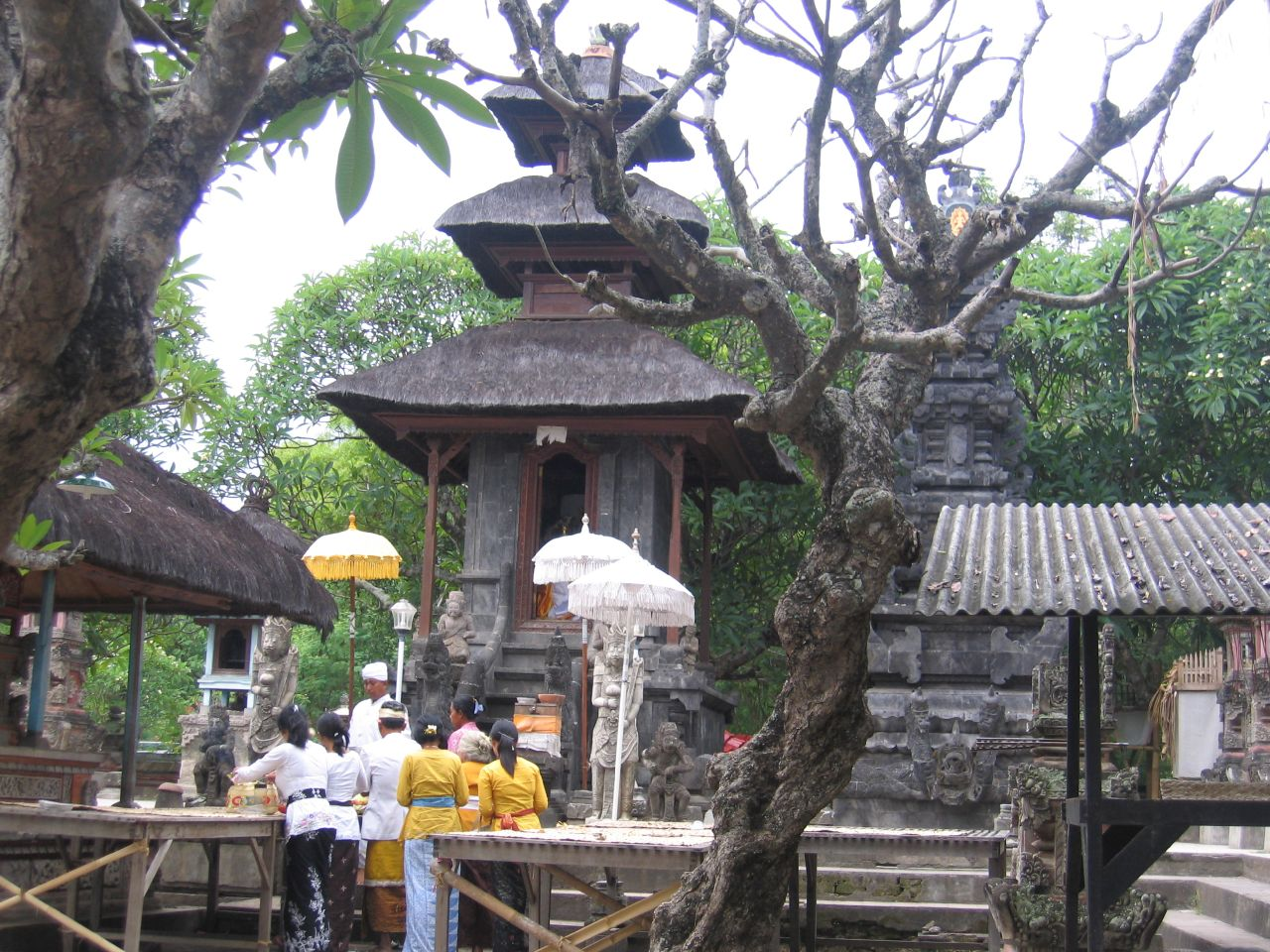
Silayukti temple

The following temples are located at Padangbai:

- Pura Silayukti (o Luhur Silayukti) sits on the small peninsula east of town. The most important historical site in Padang Bai, dating from the 11th century. Javanese Empu Kuturan, (Note: Empu Kuturan or Mpu Kuturan is not a name but a title. But the name also represents a powerful Javanese figure of the 11th century. This Mpu Kuturan is also linked to Uluwatu Temple on Bukit Peninsula, southernmost point of Bali (south of Denpasar); and to another temple.) who introduced the caste system to Bali in the 11th century, is said to have lived there. Its name is an association of the words sila meaning "basis", and yukti meaning " right" or "what is true"; the combinaison signifies that those who pray there uphold the true religious teachings.
- Pura Telaga Mas, immediately north of Silayukti temple.
- Pura Tanjung Sari, immediately south of Silayukti temple.
- Pura Tirta Segara Muncar, at the end of the peninsula where Silayukti temple sits, more or less at sea level. Tirta indicates a water temple.
- Pura Dalem, in town, north of the harbour
- Pura Pesamuhan, west end of Jl Silayukti.
- Pura Penataran Agung, west of the harbour Dating back to the 16th century, it is believed to have been built by the high priest Dang Hyang Nirartha during his missions to Bali.
- Pura Mumbul, south of the harbour
- Pura Puseh, north-west of town

=== Salt mining ===
Kusamba, a village by the stretch of black sand south-west of Padangbai, traditionally harvests salt right on the beach near the Goa Lawah temple.

A salt-concentrated brine is made by collecting seawater in buckets and pouring it slowly into wooden basins or vats filled with the black sand from the beach. The water that comes out is collected and the process is repeated a few times. Then the salt-laden water is left to rest in a second set of vats made of coconut tree wood, for some days up to a couple of weeks; some of the water evaporates there. Filtering rakes are used at some point of these operations. The next operation transfers that water to dug-out coconut trunkswhere it evaporates under the sun, leaving the salt to be carefully scraped from the hollowed trunks.

This arduous process gives a salt with a unique and distinct flavour which is slowly getting recognized as a typical Balinese product and becoming known around Bali. Well-established restaurants have started using it and it is sold in shops around Bali. This renewal may help save this salt production, which has dwindled because of the competition with the much cheaper mass-produced salt, of past government campaigns promoting iodine-enriched salt seemed healthier, and of the attraction of the tourism industry on the young generations.

About 10 to 12 tons of Kusamba sea salt are produced per month during the dry season. It is rich in minerals and iodine. There is a natural salt market in Kusamba.

== Coral restoration ==
Livingseas, located east of Padang Bai just north of the Blue Lagoon Beach, aims at building a 5-hectare coral reef. Starting in 2019, they use hexagonal steel structures coated with resin and sand, anchored on the seabed close together to maximize coral density and fasten the colonization process. It takes about 2 years before the structures disappear unders the growing corals. They also train local youths and clean up the garbage they may encounter. As of 2024, 2,719 m² of seabed has thus been revitalized.

== Gallery ==
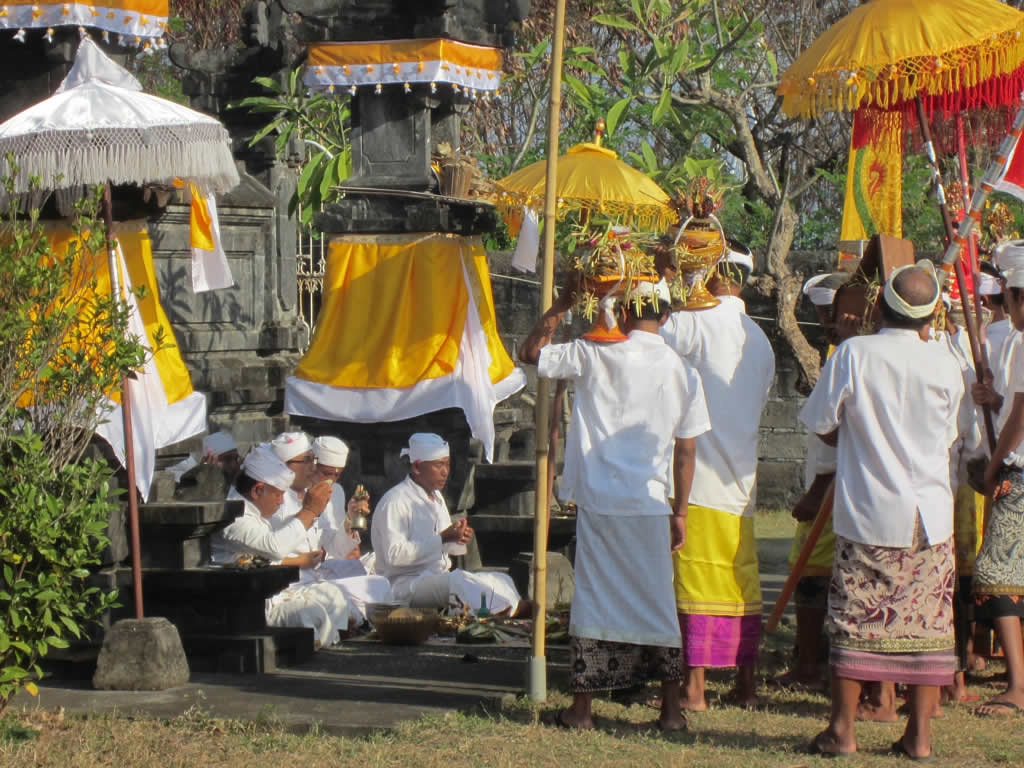
Ceremony at Silayukti temple

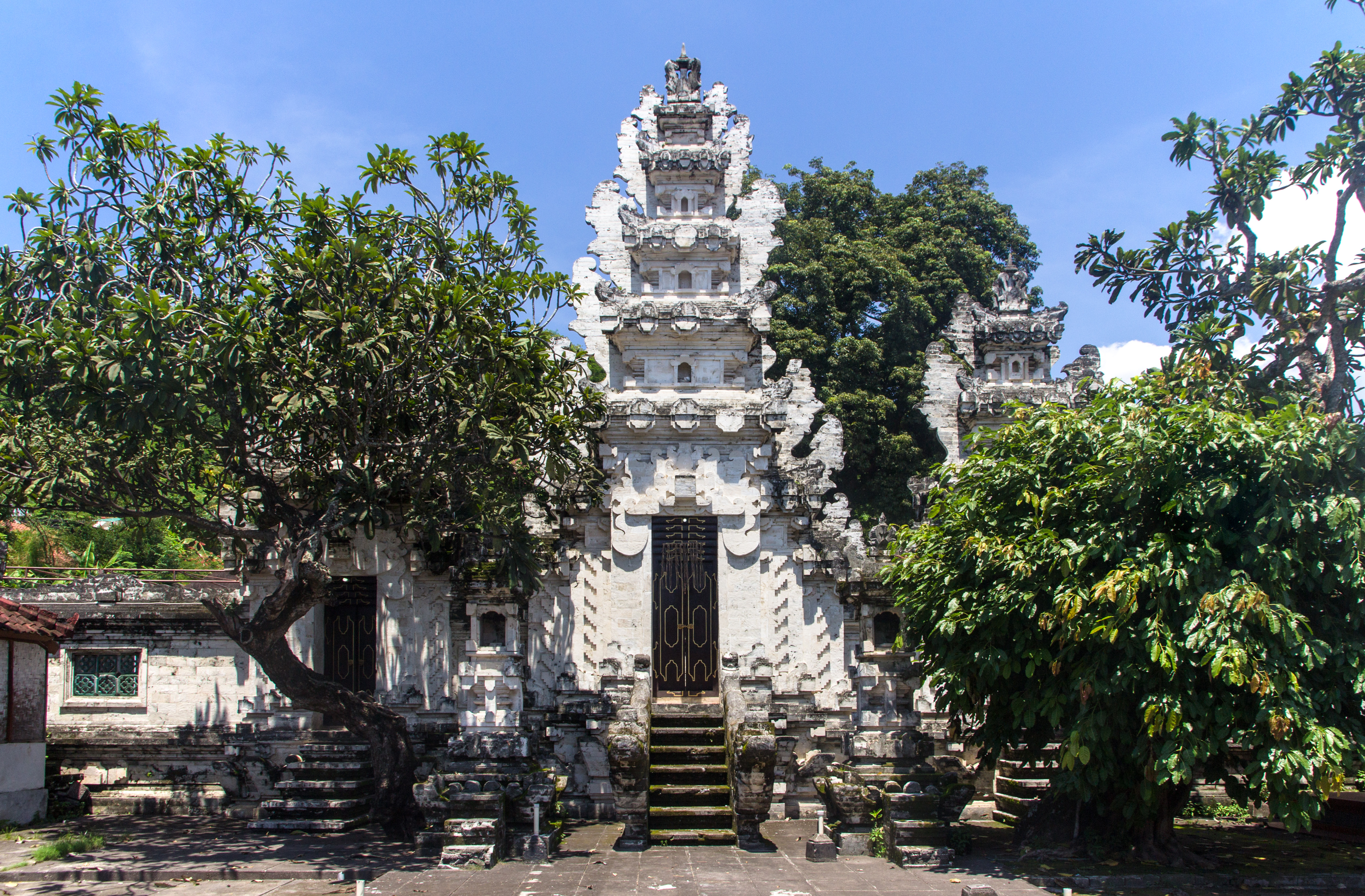
Pura Penataran Agung

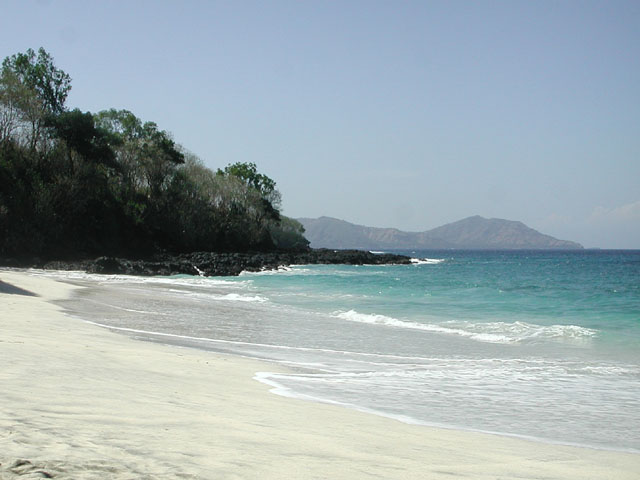
Bias Tugal Beach

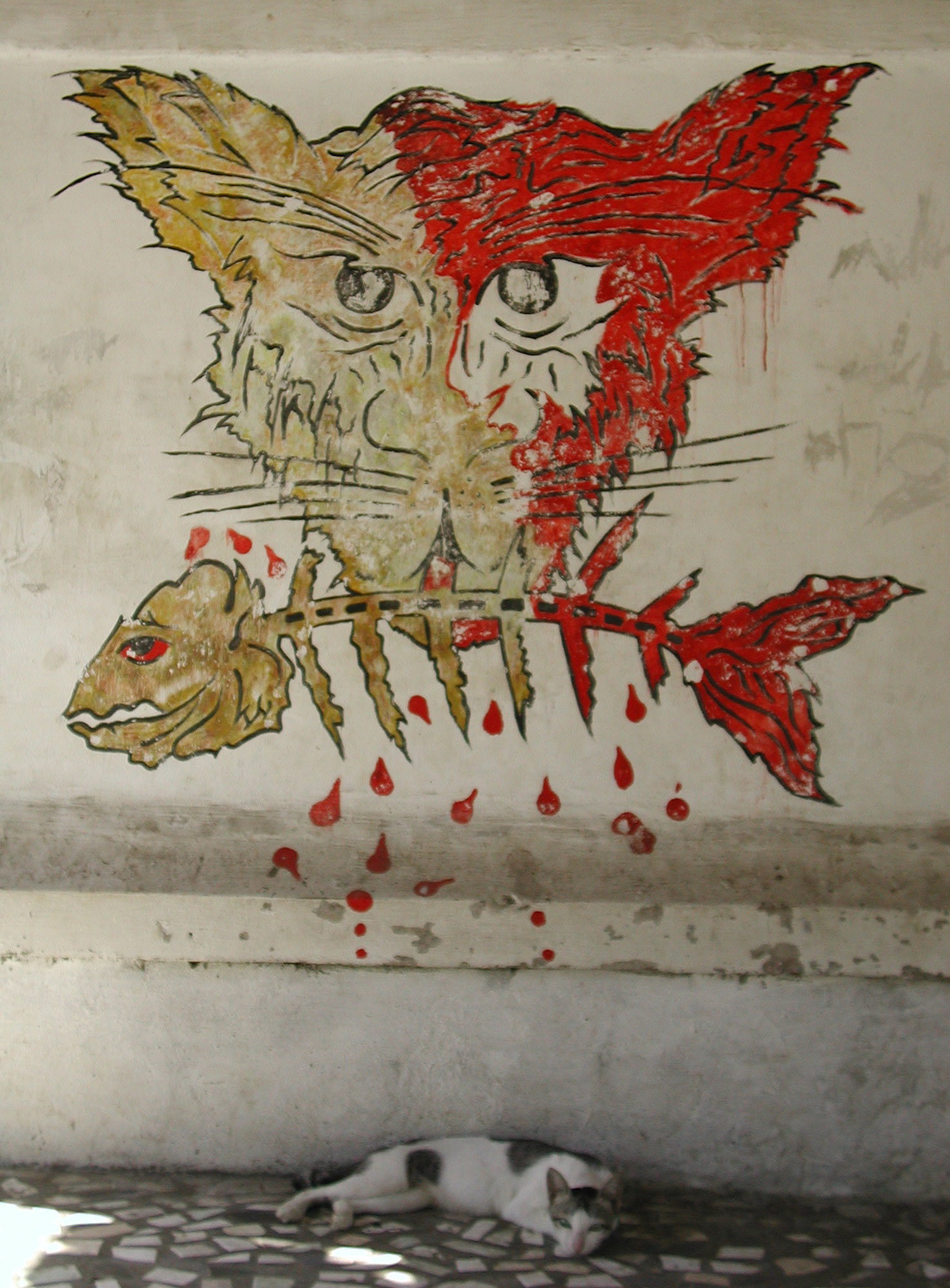
Street art

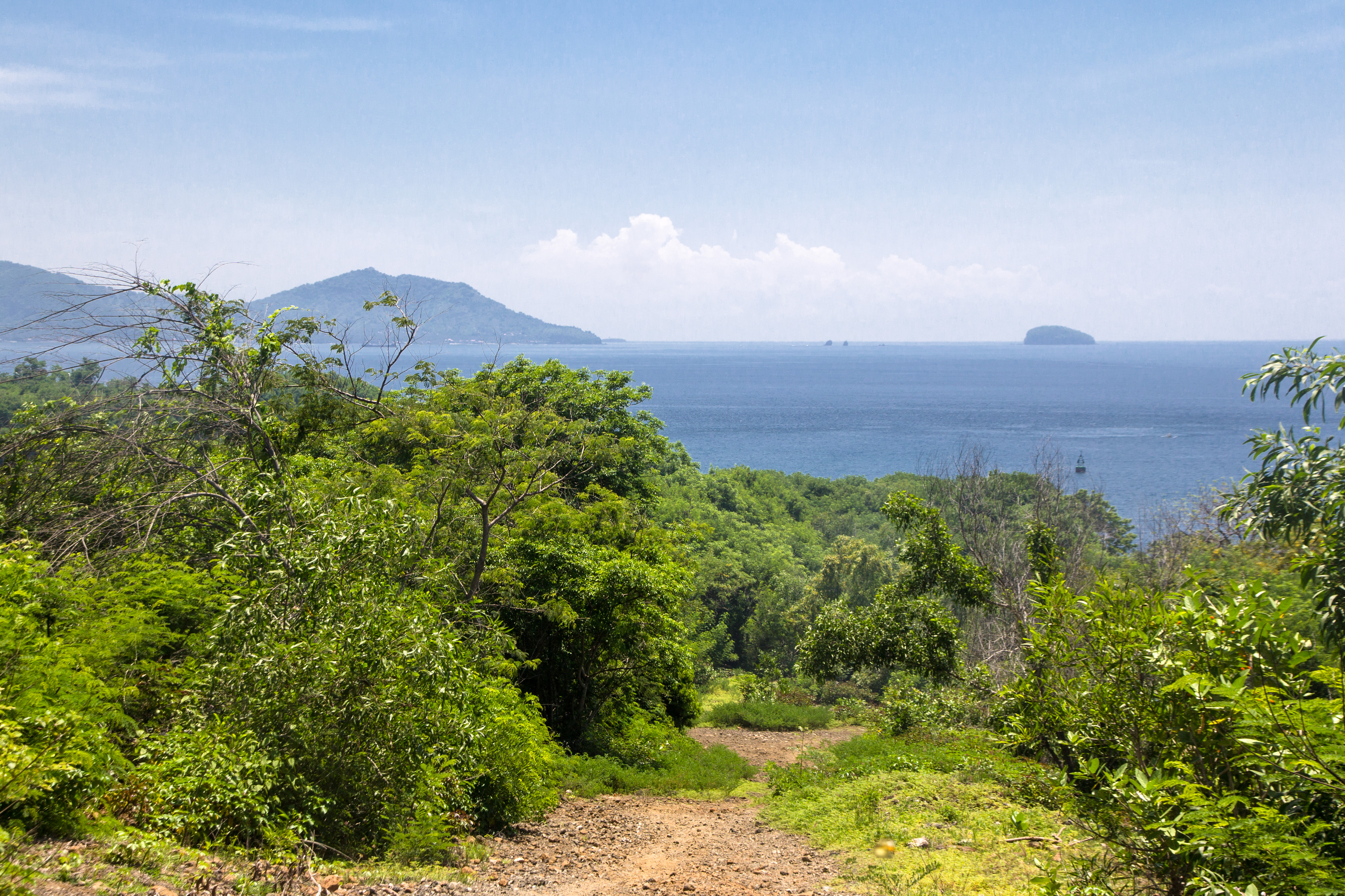
View east from the hill on the western side of the port: Candidasa over the wider bay, and the rock of Gili Bia jutting out in the Lombok Strait
