= Ujung =

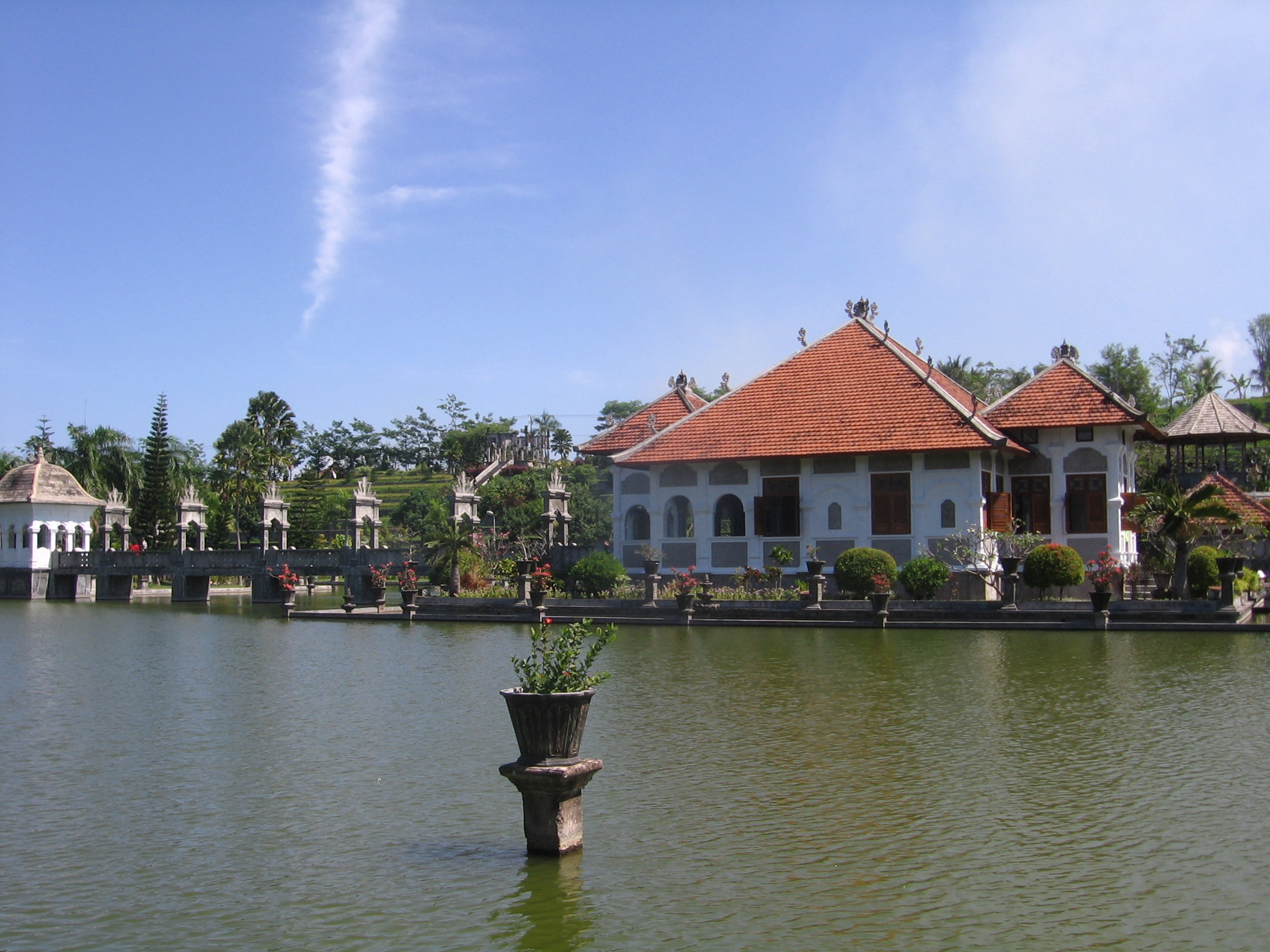
- Ujung Water Palace

- Location in Bali
- Coordinates: 8°43′S 115°12′E
- Country: Indonesia
- Province: Bali
- Time zone: UTC+8 (Central Indonesia Time)

Ujung is a village in Bali in the Lesser Sunda Islands of Indonesia. It is located 1.8 miles (2.9 km) outside Kuta on the south coast of the island .

Nearby towns and villages include Tuban (1.5 nm), Pesanggaran (1.1 nm), Serangan (1.6 nm), Jimbaran (2.5 nm) and Benoa (2.1 nm).

Not to be mistaken with the village of Ujung near Amlapura, where Ujung Water Palace is.
