= Tuban, Kuta =

Coordinates: 8°44′34″S 115°10′38″E

Tuban ᬢᬸᬩᬦ᭄
- Kelurahan
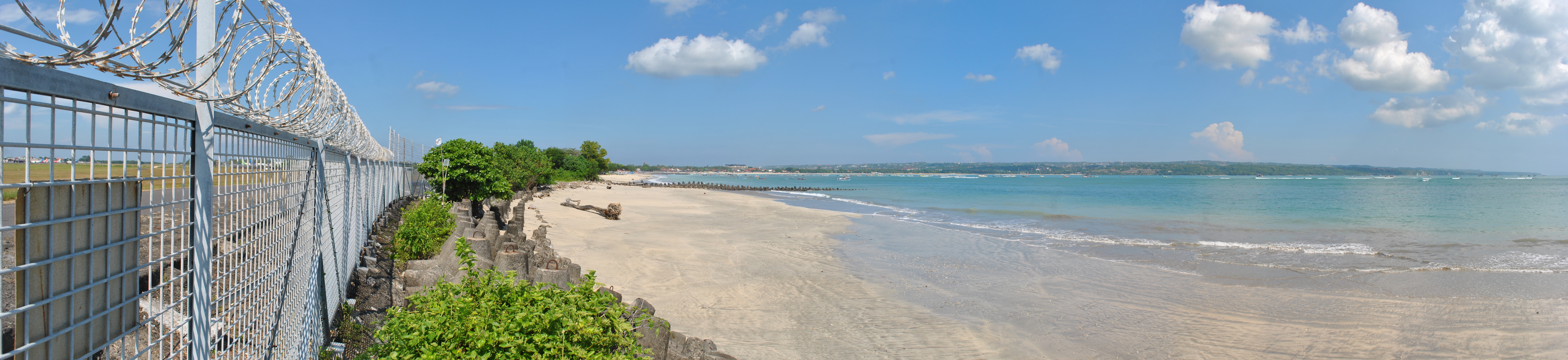
- Tuban Beach near Ngurah Rai International Airport
- Interactive map of Tuban
- Country: Indonesia
- Province: Bali
- Regency: Badung
- District: Kuta
- Time zone: UTC+8 (Indonesia Central Time)
- Postal code: 80361

Tuban (Balinese: ᬢᬸᬩᬦ᭄) is a kelurahan (subdistrict) located in Kuta District, Badung Regency, Bali, Indonesia. It contains the Ngurah Rai International Airport. Kelan is an area within the Tuban subdistrict, its within the larger Kuta District.

== Geography ==
The subdistrict has an area of 2.68 km^{2} (1.03 sq mi).

Tuban borders Kuta to the North, Benoa Port to the East, Kedonganan to the South and the Indian Ocean to the West.

The time zone used in Tuban is the Central Indonesia Standard Time (UTC+08:00).
