= Sarang =

Sarang may refer to:

== Geography ==
- Kot Sarang, a village and union council of Chakwal District in the Punjab Province of Pakistan
- Kota Sarang Semut, a small town in Kedah, Malaysia
- Kotla Sarang Khan, a village located in Kharian Tehsil, Gujrat District in Punjab Province of Pakistan
- Sarang (subdistrict), a subdistrict of Rembang Regency, Central Java, Indonesia
- Sarang, Maharashtra, a village near the town of Dapoli, Ratnagiri district, Maharashtra, India
- Sarang, Odisha, Dhenkanal district, India, location of Indira Gandhi Institute of Technology, Sarang
- Sarang Abad, a village in Khairpur District, Pakistan
- Sarang Buaya, a tourist village in Semerah, Batu Pahat District, Johor, Malaysia
- Sarang Buaya River, a river in Johor, Malaysia
- Sarang Kheda Dam, an earthfill dam on Waki river near Sinnar in the state of Maharashtra in India
- Sarang-e Sofla or Sārang, a village in Kakhk Rural District, Kakhk District, Gonabad County, Razavi Khorasan Province, Iran
- Sarang Nath or Sarnath, an ancient city in India

== Organisations and groups ==
- Community Radio Sarang, Mangalore, Karnataka, India
- SaRang Community Church, a Presbyterian Church in Seoul, Korea
- Sarang Community Church of Southern California, a Presbyterian Church in America (PCA) Korean-American church located in Anaheim, California
- Sarang display team, a helicopter aerobatic display team of the Indian Air Force
- Sarang school, Palakkad, Kerala, India

== People ==
Surname

- Rustam Sarang (born 1988), Indian weightlifter
- Vilas Sarang (1942–2015), Indian writer, critic and translator
- Vishvas Sarang (active 2013), Indian politician in Madhya Pradesh

Given name

- Sarang Gakhar (died 1546), Chief of the Gakhar tribe in the Pothohar region in northern Punjab region, in modern-day Pakistan
- Sarang Rawat (born 1995), Indian cricketer
- Sa-rang (Korean given name), a Korean given name

== Music ==
- Brindavani Sarang, a Hindustani classical raga
- Sarang ragas, a group of ragas in Hindustani classical music

== Cuisine ==
- Sarang Burung, edible Javanese bird's nests, and a specialty of Nyai Roro Kidul

== See also ==
- Saranga (disambiguation)
- Anak Perawan di Sarang Penjamun, a 1962 Indonesian film
- Sarangi, a bowed, short-necked Indian string instrument used in Hindustani classical music
- Sarangi (Nepal), a variant of the above in Nepal
- Sareng, a regional name for the Wallago attu catfish
- Sarong, a wrap-around garment
