= Sarangapani (disambiguation) =

Sarangapani was a Carnatic musician of the 17th-century.

Sarangapani may also refer to:

- Sarangapani or Sharangapani, an epithet of the Hindu god Vishnu, the bearer of sharanga bow
- Sarangapani Temple, a Hindu temple situated in Tanjore, Tamil Nadu, India
- Sarangapanipettai, a village in Tanjore district, Tamil Nadu, India

== Persons with the surname ==
- Jagannathan Sarangapani, American engineer
- P. K. Sarangapani, Indian screenwriter and playwright in Malayalam
- Thamizhavel G. Sarangapani, Indian-Singaporean writer and publisher in Tamil
- K. Sarangapani, Indian actor

== See also ==
- Sharangapani (disambiguation)
- Saranga (disambiguation)
