= Nyai Roro Kidul =

Indonesian goddess of the sea

Nyi Roro Kidul
- Ruler of the Southern Sea; Ratu Laut Selatan, Samudra Kidul
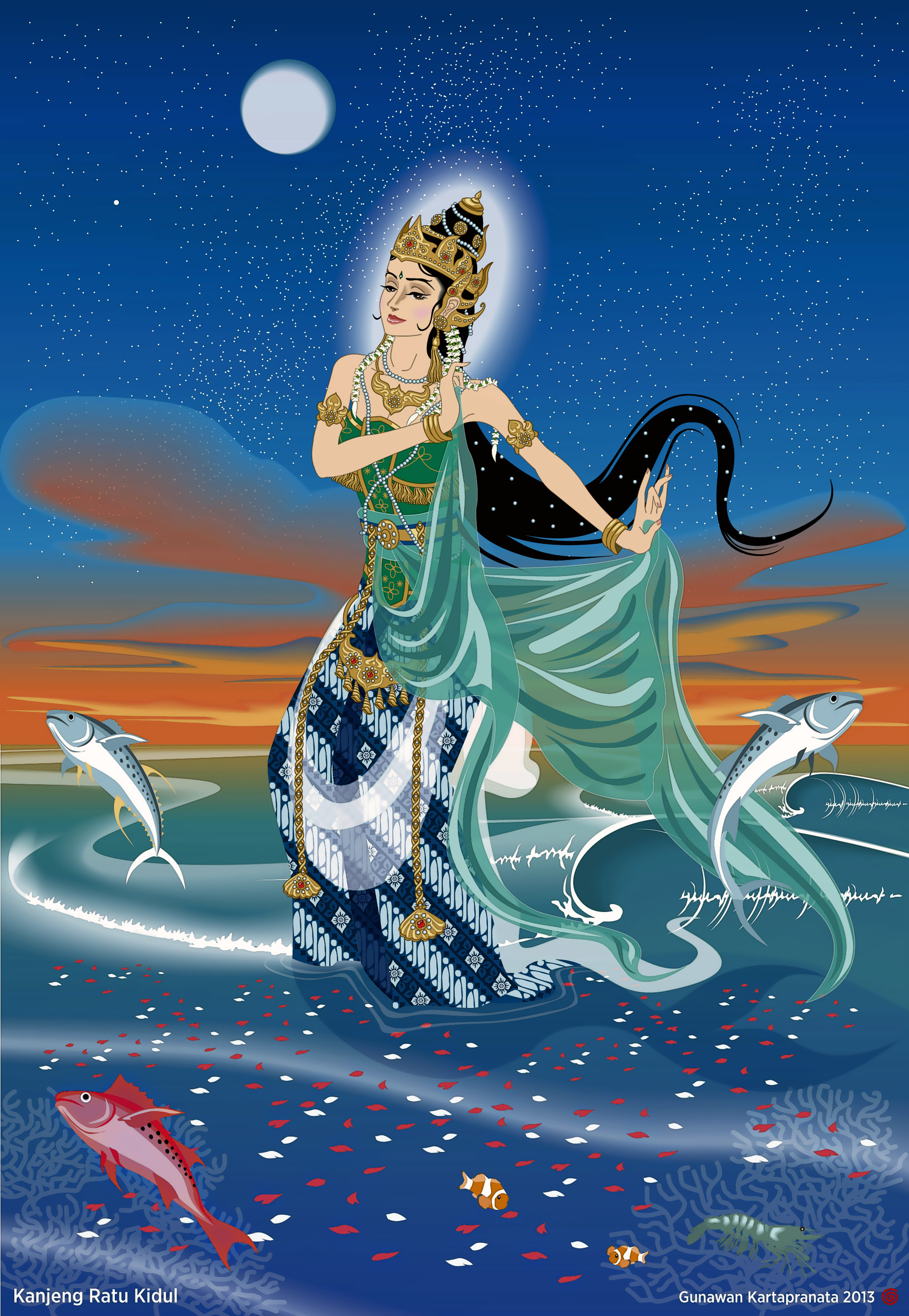
- A popular depiction of Nyai Roro Kidul
- Abode: Indian Ocean
- Color: Aqua green
- Region: Indonesia

Nyi Roro Kidul (or Nyai Rara Kidul) is a supernatural being in Indonesian folklore. She is the Queen of the Southern Sea in Sundanese and Javanese mythology.

In Javanese mythology, Kanjeng Ratu Kidul is a creation of Dewa Kaping Telu, who fills the realm of life as the goddess of harvest and nature. Meanwhile, Nyi Roro Kidul was originally the only daughter of the King of Sunda, who was expelled by her father, because of her stepmother.

Some equate Nyi Roro Kidul with Kanjeng Ratu Kidul, although in Kejawen belief, Nyi Roro Kidul is a loyal subordinate of Kanjeng Ratu Kidul.

Nyi Roro Kidul's position as the Phantom Queen of Java is a popular motif in folklore and mythology, and is also associated with the beauty of Sundanese princesses.

== Etymology ==
Nyi Roro Kidul is known by various names, reflecting the different stories of her origin, legends, myths, and hereditary stories. She is commonly called by the names Ratu Laut Selatan and Gusti Kanjeng Ratu Kidul. According to Javanese customs, honorifics, such as Nyai, Kanjeng, and Gusti, are used to refer to her for the sake of politeness.

Sometimes, people also refer to her as Nyai Loro Kidul. Javanese loro is a homograph for "two", "pain" or "suffering", while the Javanese rara (or roro) means "girl". A Dutch orthographer predicted a change from the old Javanese Roro to the new Javanese loro, resulting in a change in meaning from "beautiful girl" to "sick person".

== Origin and history ==
The legend of Nyi Rara Kidul originates from the Sunda Kingdom of Pajajaran of the 15th century and is older than that of the Islamic Mataram Kingdom of the 18th century. However, research into the cultural anthropology of the Javanese and Sundanese peoples suggests that the legend of Java's Queen of the Southern Sea may have originated from a much older prehistoric animistic belief, a pre-Hindu-Buddhist goddess of the southern ocean. The fierce Indian Ocean waves of Java's southern coast, its storms and sometimes tsunamis, may have evoked a sense of reverence and fear for the forces of nature, which came to be regarded as the spiritual realm of the gods and ancestors inhabiting the southern seas, led by their queen, a Goddess, later identified as Ratu Kidul.

=== Dewi Kadita ===
One of the Sundanese folktales tells the story of Dewi Kadita, a beautiful princess of the Sunda Kingdom, who fled to the southern ocean after being cursed by a shaman at the behest of a rival in the palace, which disfigured the princess. She jumped into the ocean, attempting suicide, but instead was cured and restored to beauty. The phantoms then made her the legendary Phantom Queen of the Southern Sea.

A similar version tells of Kadita, the only daughter of King Munding Wangi of Galuh Pakuan. Because of her beauty, she was nicknamed Dewi Srêngéngé ("Sun Goddess"). Despite having a beautiful daughter, King Munding Wangi was saddened that he did not have a son to succeed him as king. The king then married Dewi Mutiara and had a son from their marriage.

Dewi Mutiara wanted her son to become king without any obstacles in the future, so she tried to get rid of Kadita. Dewi Mutiara went to the King and asked him to ban Kadita from the palace, which he refused.

The next day, before sunrise, Dewi Mutiara sent her servant to summon a shaman. She told the shaman to cast a curse on Kadita. By nightfall, Kadita's body was itchy with scabies, foul-smelling, and full of boils. The King invited many healers to cure Kadita and realized that the disease was not natural; it must have come from a curse. Dewi Mutiara forced the King to exile his daughter as she would bring bad luck to the whole kingdom.

Kadita wandered alone, aimlessly. She did not hold a grudge against her stepmother but requested for Sanghyang Kersa to accompany her in her suffering. After almost seven days and seven nights, she finally arrived at the Southern Sea, where she heard a supernatural voice telling her to jump into sea. She jumped in and swam, and the waters of the Southern Sea removed her boils without leaving a mark, making her even more beautiful. She had power over the Southern Sea and became a goddess called Nyi Roro Kidul, who lived forever. Palabuhanratu Bay is particularly associated with this legend.

=== Princess Banyu Bening Gelang Kencana ===
Another Sundanese folktale mentions Banyoe Bening (meaning clear water) becoming Queen of the Djojo Koelon Kingdom. She suffered from leprosy and later traveled to the south, where she was taken by a huge wave to disappear into the Ocean.

== Legend and belief ==
Nyi Roro Kidul is sometimes depicted in the form of a mermaid with her lower body in the form of a snake or fish, sometimes as a very beautiful woman. She is believed to take the soul of anyone she wants. Her depiction as a snake may stem from the legend about the Princess of Pajajaran who suffered from leprosy, which was probably thought to be the same as a snake shedding its skin.

=== Pati of the army of the Southern Sea ===
Nyi Roro Kidul is believed to be the pati of Kanjeng Ratu Kidul, who leads the army of phantoms in the southern sea. Kiai Iman Sampurno from Blitar, East Java (19th century) issued a prophecy that Nyi Roro Kidul and Sunan Lawu would lead their respective armies and spread the plague to humans who do not behave well.

=== Ban on green garments ===
There is a local belief that wearing a green garment will bring the wearer bad luck, as green is Nyi Roro Kidul's favorite color. Sea green (gadhung m'lathi in Javanese) is Nyi Roro Kidul's favorite color and no one should wear the color along the southern coast of Java. People visiting the southern coast are warned not to wear green garments. According to myth, they could be targeted by Nyai Rara Kidul, to become her soldiers or slaves.

Serat Centhini mentions that Gusti Kanjeng Nyai Rara Kidul has kampuh gadhung mlathi or "a long green dodot cloth with a white center" that is gold-toned.

=== Swallow nests ===
The edible bird's nests, in the form of bird's nest soup or sarang burung, find a ready market in Thailand, Malaysia, and Singapore, and are dedicated to Nyi Roro Kidul, as reported by Sultan Agung.

There are three harvests, which are known as the Unduan-Kesongo, Unduan-Telor, and Unduan-Kepat, taking place in April, the latter part of August, and December. Rongkob and Karang Bolong along the south coast of central Java are famous for their edible bird's nests, made by so-called little sea swallows (actually Collocalia fuciphaga, called Salanganen). The harvests are famous for the wayang performances and Javanese ritual dances, accompanied by gamelan music.

These performances take place in a cave (Karang Bolong), and after their end specially prepared offerings are made in a shed, in what is known as "Ranjang Nyi Roro Kidul". This relic is hung with beautiful silk batik clothes, and a toilet mirror is placed against the green-colored pillows of the bed.

Nyi Roro Kidul is the patron goddess of the bird's nest gatherers of South Java. The gatherers descend the sheer cliff face with coconut fiber ropes to an overhang some thirty feet above the water, where a bamboo platform has been built. From there, they must await a wave, drop into it, and be swept beneath the overhang into the cave. Here, they search for nests in total darkness. Going back needs very precise timing to avoid misjudging the tides and falling into the violent waves.

=== Palabuhanratu ===
Palabuhanratu, a small fishing town in West Java, Indonesia, celebrates an annual holiday in her honor on April 6. The local fishermen annually send the sedekah laut ceremony, offering gifts and sacrifices; from rice, vegetables, and agricultural produces, to chicken, batik fabrics, and cosmetics, to be larung (sent afloat to the sea) and finally drawn into the sea to appease the queen. The local fishermen believe that the ceremony will please the Queen of the Southern Sea, and in return, this would provide plentiful catches in fisheries and bless the surrounding areas with better weather and fewer storms and waves.

Nyi Roro Kidul is also associated with Parangtritis, Parangkusumo, Pangandaran, Karang Bolong, Ngliyep, Puger, Banyuwangi, and other places along the south coast of Java. There is a local belief that wearing a green garment in these areas instead of blue, purple, lavender, magenta, pink, and violet will anger her and will bring misfortune to the wearer, as green is her sacred color.

=== Samudra Beach Hotel ===
The Samudra Beach Hotel, Palabuhanratu, West Java, keeps room 308 furnished with green colors and reserved for Nyai Loro Kidul. The first president of Indonesia, Sukarno, was involved with the exact location and the idea for the Samudra Beach Hotel. In front of room 308 is one Ketapang tree where Sukarno got his spiritual inspiration. A painting of Nyai Rara Kidul by Basuki Abdullah, a famous Indonesian painter, is displayed in this room.

=== Yogyakarta and Central Java ===
The legend of Queen Kidul is often associated with beaches in Yogyakarta, especially Parangkusumo and Parangtritis. Parangkusumo, in particular, is special since it was the place believed to be the location of the first spiritual encounter between the Queen with Panembahan Senopati. Legends recount her love for Senopati and Sultan Agung of Mataram, which continues to be recounted in the ritualized Bedhaya dance by the royal line of Surakarta, and she is honored by the susuhunans of Solo/Surakarta and the sultans of Yogyakarta, Central-Java. When Sri Sultan Hamengkubuwono IX died on October 3, 1988, the Tempo news magazine reported her sighting by palace servants, who were sure that she was paying her final tribute to the deceased King.

== Kanjeng Ratu Kidul ==
Nyi Roro Kidul is often equated with Kanjeng Ratu Kidul, though they are different individuals.

Kanjeng Ratu Kidul is often illustrated as a mermaid with a tail as well as the lower body parts of a fish. The mythical creature is claimed to be able to take the soul of any who she wishes. According to local popular beliefs around coastal villages in Southern Java, the Queen often claims the lives of fishermen or visitors who bathe on the beach, and she usually prefers handsome young men.

The role of Kanjeng Ratu Kidul as a Javanese Spirit-Queen became a popular motif in traditional Javanese folklore and palace mythologies, as well as being tied in with the beauty of Sundanese and Javanese princesses. Another aspect of her mythology was her ability to change shape and her appearance several times a day. Sultan Hamengkubuwono IX of Yogyakarta described his experience on spiritual encounters with the spirit Queen in his memoir; the queen could change shapes and appearance, usually appearing as a beautiful young woman during a full moon, and as an old woman at other times.

Kanjeng Ratu Kidul is in control of the violent waves of the Indian Ocean from her dwelling place in the heart of the ocean in a significant amount of the folklore that surrounds her. Sometimes, she is referred to as one of the spiritual queens or wives of the Susuhunan of Solo or Surakarta and the Sultan of Yogyakarta. Her location is considered to correspond to the Merapi-Kraton-South Sea axis in the Solo Sultanate and Yogyakarta Sultanate.

Another pervasive part of folklore surrounding her is the color aqua green, gadhung m'lathi in Javanese, which is favored and referred to by her and is thus forbidden to wear along the southern coast of Java. She is often described as wearing clothes or selendang (silky sashes) in this color.

== In popular culture ==
The myth of Nyi Loro Kidul as the queen of the southern ocean has become a popular source of inspiration in Indonesian culture, both traditional and modern.

Some local traditional theaters, particularly Sundanese Sandiwara and Javanese Kethoprak, may retell this legend in their performances. It has become the main theme of mystery, horror, and epic genres of Indonesian film and sinetron TV series.

The tale of the Queen of the Southern Ocean has become the source of one of Mobile Legends: Bang Bang character, Kadita from the Kingdom of Sunda. She is also the inspiration behind the song “Queen of the South” by the Bandung band The Panturas.

== See also ==
- Bedhaya
- Cerita rakyat
- Javanese sacred places
- Kejawèn
- Manimekhala, a Sea Goddess worshipped in nearby Indochina
- Mazu, Chinese Goddess of Sea
- Dewi Lanjar, Goddess of the north sea, the opposite of Nyai Roro Kidul
- Dewi Sri, Goddess of Rice worshipped by Javanese, Balinese and Sundanese

== Notes ==
- Becker, Judith. Gamelan Stories: Tantrism, Islam, and Aesthetics in Central Java. Arizona State University Program for Southeast Asian Studies, 1993. ISBN 1-881044-06-8 (The Journal of Asian Studies, Vol. 56, No. 1 (Feb., 1997), pp. 246–247)
- Fischer, Joseph. assisted by James Danandjaja ... [et al.].The folk art of Java / Kuala Lumpur; New York: Oxford University Press, 1994. ISBN 967-65-3041-7. Section – 8. Images of Ratu Kidul, Queen of the South Sea
- Olthof W.L. J.J. Meinsma, J.J. Ras Babad Tanah Jawi. Foris Publications Dordrecht-Holland/Providence-USA, 1987. ISBN 90-6765-218-0
- Mudjanto, G. The concept of power in Javanese culture. Gadjah Mada University Press, 1986. ISBN 978-979-420-024-7
- Mulder, Niels. Inside Indonesian Society Cultural Change in Java. The Pepin Press, Amsterdam – Kuala Lumpur 1996. ISBN 90-5496-026-4
- Mulder, Niels. Mysticism & Everyday Life in Contemporary Java. Singapore University Press, Second edition 1980.
- Schlehe, Judith. Die Meereskönigin des Südens, Ratu Kidul. Dietrich Reimer Verlag, Berlin 1998. ISBN 3-496-02657-X
- Schlehe, Judith. Versionen enier Wasserwelt: Die Geisterkönigin im javanischen Südmeer. B. hauser-Schäublin (Hg.) Script Ethnologische Frauenforshung, Berlin 1991
