= Sulaiman Ninam Shah =

Malaysian businessman and politician

Yang Amat Berbahagia Tun Sulaiman Ninam Shah SSM PMN SPMJ SSIJ PIS BSI JP

Deputy President of the Dewan Negara
- In office 14 December 1982 – 1 April 1985
- Preceded by: Abdul Hamid Bidin
- Succeeded by: Abang Ahmad Urai

Member of the Johore State Legislative Assembly for Parit Jawa
- In office 19 August 1959 – 25 April 1964
- Preceded by: Constituency created
- Succeeded by: Che Sairan Sabtu
- Majority: 7,020 (1959)

Member of the Johore State Council for Muar Coastal
- In office 10 October 1954 – 19 August 1959
- Preceded by: Constituency created
- Succeeded by: Constituency abolished

Personal details
- Born: 2 January 1920 Kampung Sarang Buaya, Muar, Johor, British Malaya (now Malaysia)
- Died: 5 July 2003 (aged 83) Pantai Medical Centre, Kuala Lumpur
- Resting place: 6th Mile Muslim Cemetery, Jalan Bakri, Bukit Bakri, Muar, Johor
- Citizenship: Malaysian
- Party: United Malays National Organisation (UMNO) (1946-2003)
- Spouse: Toh Puan Rose Othman
- Children: 6 sons and 3 daughters

Tun Sulaiman bin Ninam Shah (2 January 1920 – 5 July 2003) was a Malaysian businessman and veteran politician. He was also former member of Johore State Council for Muar Pesisir (1954–1959) and Johor State Legislative Assembly for Parit Jawa (1959–1964), former Senator (1979–1985) and the 6th Deputy President of the Dewan Negara (1982–1985). He was one of the founders of United Malays National Organisation (UMNO) and former Permanent Chairman of UMNO (1976-2003).

== Family ==
Sulaiman was born in Kampung Sarang Buaya, Muar, Johor to a Malay family of mixed Indian Tamil Muslim descent. He married Rose Othman in 1946 and the couple had six sons and three daughters named, Datin Faridah, Datuk Kadar Shah, Mohd Shah, Othman, Zainal Abidin, Mariam, Hassan, Mohd Nathir and Intaan Rogayah.

== Early life ==
Sulaiman started his career as a police constable in Johor in 1939. Three years later when Malaya was under the Japanese occupation, he was promoted as the Police Vehicles Officer and later as the Assistant Superintendent of Police (ASP) to work as the Police Chief of Muar district until the surrender of Japan in 1945. At the same time, Sulaiman started to become involved in business by opening a newspapers, magazines and books store in Muar. Sulaiman in the subsequent year he managed to get a tender contract to provide foods supplies to Muar Hospital. In the 1970s, he started a joint-venture company opening a palm oil estate in Segamat.

Sulaiman later successfully got elected as the chairman and director for companies such as Budget Rent-A-Car, Laksamana Tour, Top Coach Builder, Malacca-Singapore Ekspress, Pelaburan Johor Bhd., T & T Properties, Menara Landmark and also Bank Rakyat.

== Politics ==
Sulaiman was involved in politics since the foundation of UMNO in 1946. In the 1st general election of Malaya in 1954 before Independence, he contested as an Alliance Party candidate and won the Muar Pesisir seat to be a member of Johore State Council. In the second Malayan general election in 1959, he contested again under Alliance Party and managed to defeat the Pan-Malayan Islamic Party (PMIP) candidate with 7,020 majority votes to be the Johor state assemblyman for Parit Jawa seat. However, he had a heart condition which caused him to retract from re-contesting in 1964 general election.

He maintained his position as Deputy Chairman of the Muar Division of UMNO until 1967. In the following year he was selected as the Permanent Chairman of UMNO Malaysia in 1976 before being elected permanently in 1978. He held the position until his death in 2003.

Sulaiman was also appointed senator in Dewan Negara for two terms from 1979 to 1985 which he was elected as the Deputy President in the second term.

On June 22, 2002, at 5:50 PM, as the UMNO assembly was nearing its conclusion, Prime Minister Mahathir Mohamad unexpectedly announced his resignation from the positions of UMNO president and prime minister, causing a strong reaction from everyone present. Sulaiman, who was presiding over the meeting, stood up to speak in an attempt to request everyone to remain calm. Subsequently, Sulaiman announced a 10-minute recess for the assembly.

== Death ==
In June 2003, Sulaiman was unable to preside over the 54th UMNO assembly due to health issues. This assembly marked the last one before Prime Minister and UMNO President Mahathir Mohamad was set to retire. Sulaiman expressed frustration and sadness at his inability to attend. Mahathir later offered prayers for his swift recovery during the assembly.

On 5 July 2003, Sulaiman, 83, died from leukaemia, at the Pantai Medical Centre, Kuala Lumpur. He was buried at 6th Mile Muslim Cemetery, Jalan Bakri, Bukit Bakri, Muar, Johor. After visiting the mourning house to offer condolences, Mahathir expressed high appreciation for his contributions to UMNO and the nation.

== Honours ==
=== Honours of Malaysia ===
- Malaysia
  - Companion of the Order of the Defender of the Realm (JMN) (1976)
  - Commander of the Order of Loyalty to the Crown of Malaysia (PSM) – Tan Sri (1984)
  - Commander of the Order of the Defender of the Realm (PMN) – Tan Sri (1996)
  - Grand Commander of the Order of Loyalty to the Crown of Malaysia (SSM) – Tun (2002)
- Johor
  - Knight Grand Commander of the Order of the Crown of Johor (SPMJ) – Dato' (1970)
  - Knight Grand Companion of the Order of Loyalty of Sultan Ismail of Johor (SSIJ) – Dato' (1976)
  - Sultan Ibrahim Medal (PIS)
  - Star of Sultan Ismail (BSI)

=== Places named after him ===
Several places were named after him, including:

- Sekolah Menengah Kebangsaan Tun Sulaiman Ninam Shah, Muar, Johor. (a secondary school formerly SMK Jalan Junid which was renamed in honour of Tun Sulaiman Ninam Shah)
- Taman Tun Sulaiman Ninam Shah (a housing area near Jalan Junid, Parit Sakai, Muar, Johor)
- Jalan Sulaiman Ninam Shah 1 - Jalan Sulaiman Ninam Shah 6 (streets of Taman Bunga Mawar, Muar, Johor)
- Dewan Tun Sulaiman Ninam Shah (a multi-purpose hall of Bangunan UMNO Muar, 123, Jalan Meriam, Taman Sri Tanjung, Muar, Johor)
