= Karang Bolong Beach =

Karang Bolong Beach may refer to:

- Karang Bolong Beach (Nusa Kambangan), a beach in Nusa Kambangan, Cilacap, Central Java
- Karang Bolong Beach (Anyer), a beach in Anyer, West Java
