= Serat Centhini =

Javanese literary and spiritual work

Serat Centhini is a twelve-volume compilation of Javanese tales and teachings, written in verse and published in 1814. The work was commissioned, directed, and partially written by Crown Prince Mangkunegoro, later enthroned as Pakubuwono V of Surakarta, with contributions from three court poets from different palaces.

== Chronology ==
The events depicted in Serat Centhini take place in the 1630s when Sultan Agung of Mataram's army besieged and captured the city of Giri Kedaton in Gresik, East Java.

Giri Kedaton had a religious school that was founded by Sunan Giri, one of the Wali Sanga. The school grew and became famous as a center of Muslim teaching, which gave it political influence in the surrounding region. It attracted learners from multiple societal groups and regions as far away as Ternate Sultanate.

Giri Kedaton reached the peak of its influence under Sunan Giri Prapen who ruled it from 1548 to 1605. Sultan Agung of the larger Mataram Sultanate regarded this as a threat, so in 1630 he sent an army under his brother-in-law, Pangeran Pekik to capture Giri Kedaton. Giri Kedaton finally surrendered in 1636. Sunan Giri Prapen was captured and brought to Mataram's capital Kota Gede, known today as Yogyakarta.

The main characters of Serat Centhini are Sunan Giri Prapen's three young children who escape Giri Kedaton overnight, hours before the city falls to the army from Mataram. The children become separated in the confusion as inhabitants flee the city. They each spend several years wandering around Java, only to be reunited many years later.

== Main characters ==
The main characters of the story are:

- Jayengresmi, son of Sunan Giri Prapen (later called Syeh Amongrogo)
- Jayengsari, son of Sunan Giri Prapen (later called Mangunarsa)
- Rancangkapti, daughter of Sunan Giri Prapen
- Ki Akadiat, an old man who adopts Jayengsari and Rancangkapti
- Mas Cabolang, son of Ki Akadiat (later called Anggungrimang)
- Nyi Tembangraras, wife of Jayengresmi
- Ki Bayu Panurto, father of Nyi Tembangraras
- Centhini, maid of Nyi Tembangraras
- Gathak and Gathuk, servants of Jayengresmi (later called Jamal and Jamil)
- Buras, servant of Jayengsari and Rancangkapti (later called Montel)

== Story outline ==
The Centhini story is separated by phases of its characters' lives (pre-adulthood, adulthood, and post-adulthood) and by the adventures of each character (Jayengresmi, Jayengsari, Rancangkapti, and Mas Cabolang).

In the pre-adulthood journey, geographic locations still can be identified on the real-world map. But in the post-adulthood journeys, the locations become mystical and imaginary, as though in a different realm. The mixture of real-world and imaginary locations is similar to that of Homer's Odyssey.

As adults, the characters changed their names to avoid capture by Sultan Agung's spies.

=== Pre-Adulthood journey ===
After fleeing the conquered city the oldest son, Jayengresmi wanders in the southern part of Java and then to its westernmost part. The second son, Jayengsari, and his sister, Rancangkapti, flee to the east, later travelling by ship to central Java.

Journey of Jayengresmi

Jayengresmi's travels take him and his servants Gathak and Gathuk through the mountainous terrain where hermits live. Their journey passes through historic areas including:

1. Majapahit Kingdom ruins in Trowulan, East Java.

Majapahit's golden age was in the 14th century. Close to the ruins, they visit Hindu temples from the same era, such as the Naga and Panataran temples.

2. Medang Kamulan Kingdom, Central Java

Medang Kamulan is a semi-mythological kingdom believed to have been in the Purwodadi Grobogan region in the 7th and 8th centuries. It preceded the Medang Kingdom, which moved its court several times around Kedu Plain, Central Java, and later to East Java.

3. The Chronicles of Kyai Ageng Selo, the 16th-century forefather of the rulers of the Mataram Sultanate, the Mataram Kingdom after the adoption of Islam.

The capital of the Mataram Kingdom and Mataram Sultanate was Kota Gede, Yogyakarta.

4. Demak Sultanate

Demak was the first kingdom in Java to adopt Islam. It was founded in the 15th century on the north coast of Central Java.

5. The story of Syekh Siti Jenar

in a hermitage, Jayengresmi is told the story of the Sufi Seh Lemah-Abang (Syekh Siti Jenar). Walisanga Muslims considered Sufism to be heresy. During a conference of Moslem saints, he argued with other saints over the perception of Truth as a mystic union with the Creator/Manunggaling Kawula Gusti. He was executed - which is depicted as a mere transition to an incorporeal world.

6. Introduction of the Javanese Almanac

In another hermitage, Jayengresmi is introduced to the Wuku, the Javanese Almanac.

7. Muslim Teachings

In several hermitages, Jayengresmi teaches the Islamic practices of Tahajjud (optional late-night prayers) and Martabat Tujuh (the Seven Stages of Creation). In return, his servants are taught the secret of longevity through Puja Dina, a Muslim prayer ritual.

8. Ruins of Pajajaran/Sunda Kingdom

The kingdom of Pajajaran in West Java was a rival to the kingdom of Majapahit in the 13th century. The ruins of its capital are in the present-day region of Bogor.

9. Jayengresmi ends his first journey in Karang Hermitage, Banten, West Java.

Seh Ibrahim ibn Abubakar, also known as Kyai Ageng Karang, is the hermit of Karang and comes originally from Arabia. After losing his son it was prophesied that the son of Sunan Giri would come to him and become his son. He adopts Jayengresmi as his son.

Journey of Jayengsari and Rancangkapti

Jayengsari and Rancangkapti are accompanied by their servant Buras. They visit the sites of old Javanese kingdoms and learn legends.

1. Singhasari/Singosari Kingdom in East Java, 13th century.

Singosari is a Kingdom that precede Majapahit Kingdom in the Hindu Era. Its heritage is Temple Singosari and Kidal.

2. Hindu Society in Tengger, Bromo and Semeru mountain.

Tengger is a region that still has the Hindu religion, even today. Hindu teachings were introduced by a hermit in the Semeru Mountains.

3. Muslim teachings and introduction to celibacy

During their journey in Probolinggo, they were introduced to several Muslim teachings. They met a holy maid who taught them the joy of celibacy.

4. Banyuwangi and Ijen Mountain and Blambangan Kingdom

Ijen Mountain is famous for its Tosca color crater. Nearby they found the marble temple of Candi Sela Cendhani (that no longer exists), which was King Menakjinggo's palace during the Majapahit era. Menak Jinggo is a King of the Blambangan Kingdom, a rival to the Majapahit Kingdom. Menak Jinggo would later rebel against its Majapahit rulers. The Blambangan Kingdom survived for two centuries after Majapahit's demise.
In Banyuwangi, Jayengsari and Rancangkapti would meet Ki Hartati, who would become their temporary adopted father. From Banyuwangi, he took them to Pekalongan via the North Java Ocean route.

5. The harbour of Pekalongan

Jayengsari and Rancangkapti arrived at Pekalongan and stayed with their adopted parents. Two years after their adopted mother's death, they were told by their adopted father to continue their journey to the next destination, the hermitage of Sukoyoso in Dieng Plateau, and to study with its hermit, Ki Ageng/Seh Akadiyat. Soon afterwards, Ki Hartati also died.

6. The end of Jayengsari and Rancangkapti journey in Sokoyoso, Dieng Plateau

The brother and sister met Ki Ageng, the hermit of Sokoyoso, and his wife Nyai Wuryan. They welcomed the youngsters in delight because their son, Mas Cabolang, left home for his interests. Jayengsari and Rancangkapti were then adopted as their children and stayed with them for the next several years.

Journey of Mas Cabolang

Mas Cabolang is the son of Ki Ageng/Seh Akadiyat, the hermit of Sokoyoso Hermitage in Dieng Plateau. He left his parents' house without asking their permission. His objective is to have his adventure to understand more of the world. His journey began on the southwest route to Cilacap Region and then turned to the east, through Mataram Sultanate's capital (Kota Gede), and moved to the eastern part of Java Island before finally going back to Sokoyoso.

1. Journey throughout Banyumas, Serayu River to Cilacap and the story of Wijayakusuma Flower in Nusakambangan Island

Mas Cabolang visited several hermitages throughout the Banyumas region which are described as having beautiful pristine waterfalls that form the headwaters of Serayu River. The river flows to the southern coast of Java Island, towards Karang Bolong-Ujung Kalang caves, in the Cilacap region. The teachings of Islam have been spread throughout the region and the caves were used as a natural structure mosque. From on top of the nearby Curiwing Mountain, Mas Cabolang could see Nusakambangan Island. He is being told about the legend of Wijayakusuma Flower. Nusa Kambangan Island is a place where Kresna hides the Wijoyosukumo Flower (A flower that has the magic of resurrecting the dead). Any Javanese Prince who is about to be crowned has to dispatch a messenger to the island to retrieve the flower. In case the deity disagrees, the messenger will be swallowed by the south ocean.

2. Kedu Plain, Progo River, and Mas Cabolang's marriage to his four wives

From Cilacap, Mas Cabolang continued his journey to the east toward the mountainous area of Sundoro in Kedu Plain, Central Java. From on top of one mountain area, he could see the southern Java Ocean. There is a spring that becomes the headwater of the Progo River. The Spring still became an important site for Buddhist procession which is being held until today. During Waisak (Vesak Day), Buddhist monks will carry 1000 bottles of the spring's water to the Borobudur temple.
Mas Cabolang granted the secret of his beauty via meditation in one of the springs. Coming down to the lower Tidar Mountain, Mas Cabolang met Seh Wakidiyat and finally married his four beautiful female students after solving a riddle. However, unable to satisfy the 4 wives, Mas Cabolang asks for advice from the hermit, therefore he is given six ways of amorous play. But after staying and marrying the woman for a while, Mas Cabolang remembers one hermit's advice to continue his journey to Wirosobo. Seh Wakidiyat advises him to divorce the four wives and continue his journey and in the future, he could remarry the 4 women again.

3. Temples of Borobudur and Mendut

Leaving his wives, Mas Cabolang continued his journey and arrived at Borobudur, a site of 1000 years ago, even for his time. As they observed the temples, the reliefs reminded them of The Tales of Jataka (Stories of living beings who later became Buddha).

4. Mataram, the knowledge of sexuality, weaponry, Javanese architecture, and wedding procession.

In Mataram, Mas Cabolang met new friends who, in between their activities, would exchange knowledge such as sexuality, weaponry, and the best timing to build a house. Later on, they had to help a friend who held a wedding ceremony and was introduced to its detailed procession. When the guests of the wedded family joined, the discussion went on to varieties of topics from one epic of Mahabharata (Javanese version, namely Jamus kalimosodo), The Story of King Amat Salekah (from Istanbul) and The Story of Siti Dara Murtasiyah. The next day, the Puppet Show (wayang kulit) with King Partodewo's story is being performed.
While in Mataram, Mas Cabolang also took a look at several canons which are gifts from Europeans (Portuguese). They continued their journey to some places whilst getting more insights ie. the story of the paper, the meaning of the religious lyrics played by rebanas, and the teaching of sastra cetha.

5. The knowledge of Javanese marriage and family life.

Finally, Mas Cabolang and his santris left Mataram and on the next stop, Kepurun Village, a new friend would teach Mas Cabolang about the Javanese way of finding a good wife, how to safeguard marriage, the science of lovemaking, how to have a decent sex relationship, the conception and determining the gender and character of a baby in the womb.

6. Prambanan Temple and introduction to incest case

Mas Cabolang arrived at Prambanan and heard The Legend of Lorojonggrang from its caretaker. This was the first time he was being introduced to cases of incest.

7. The Four Stages of Knowledge

Leaving Prambanan, the wayfarers went on to the east. In one of the hermitages, they learned about the 4 stages of knowledge and their analogy: the first knowledge is the one being practiced by the body (analogy of having a boat), it is being practiced by the spirit (analogy of one knows a sailor), it is being practiced by the soul (analogy of one would understand which depth of the ocean where precious pearl lies) and the last one is the sum of all that knowledge.

8. The history of woods as material to build a house.

The wayfarers met new friends of Kalang who told them about the history of the first building made of wood upon Medang Kamulan Palace's request and how they started cultivating trees and planning home construction. The knowledge went mo in-depth in terms of wood materials, wood processing, and Javanese building architecture. The wayfarers got a rebana instrument from the host as a farewell gift.

9. Introduction to Javanese Medicine

Further way to the east of Mataram, they met a hermitage whose wife would teach them about Javanese medicine (Jamu).

10. Pajang and Jayabaya Prophecy

The wayfarers arrived at the old site of the Pajang Kingdom whose King has the same genealogy as Mataram's from King Brawijaya's lineage. The story went on to explain King Brawijaya's lineage which went down to Joko Tingkir who became the King of Pajang titled Sultan Adiwijoyo. Also explained, was that other sons of King Brawijaya from his Chinese wife, Raden Patah, became the first King of a Muslim Kingdom on Java Island. The other son of King Brawijaya, Sultan Agung, became the King of the Mataram Sultanate.
On this occasion, the famous prophecies of Jayabaya were also explained. According to Jayabaya, the history of Java is divided into 3 periods, Kalisworo, Kaliyogo, and Kalisengoro.

11. Affairs and scandalous adventures

In the Ponorogo region, Mas Cabolang and his attendants received new sexual knowledge from their local new friends while having the opportunities to also practice it with the locals. They were also introduced to the Jathilan performance, a dance that is being performed by homosexual couples. There too, Mas Cabolang and one of his handsome attendants encountered more sexual experiences with women as well as with the jathils, the homosexual men.
The wayfarers left the Ponorogo region headed to the northeast and arrived in Wirosobo. There was an incident where one of his handsome santri (Nurwitri) encountered a homosexual affair with the regent of Wirosobo. Mas Cabolang and Nurwitri went too far in creating chaos by having affairs with the women of Wirosobo. The scandal made the husbands and the Regent of Wirosobo extremely angry and ordered their arrest.

12. The end of Mas Cabolang's adventure, in Semeru Mountain and the knowledge of Roh Ilapi.

After the scandalous adventures, the wayfarers were feeling full of regrets. They realized that they had gone through the wrong way of living their life. Therefore they determined to go back home and repent of their sins. The oldest santri advised them to meet a hermit near the region, in Semeru Mountain before returning to Sokoyoso. The hermit taught them with the knowledge of Roh Ilapi.

13. Back to Sokoyoso

Mas Cabolang went back to his parents’ house at Sokoyoso and met Jayengsari and Rancangkapti who already become his adopted brother and sister.

=== Adulthood journey ===
Journey of Jayengresmi (Ki Amongrogo)

Jayengresmi already stayed for a few years in Karang Hermitage with his adopted father, Kyai Ageng Karang until finally, he asked for permission to leave and to continue searching for his brother and sisters. Before letting them leave his hermitage, his adopted father suggests they change their names: Jayengresmi became Ki Amongrogo, and Gathak and Gathuk became Jamal and Jamil.

1. Amongrogo's wedding and new family at Wonomarto

Ki Amongrogo and his attendants went eastward through the middle mountainous part of Java Island, through Sindoro Mountain, and finally arrived at Wonomarto and met Wonomarto's hermit, Ki Bayi Panurto. Ki Amongrogo is determined to stay and study with Ki Bayi. It is in this hermitage that Ki Amongrogo finally married Ki Bayi's eldest daughter, Ni Ken Tembangraras. Within this section, the details of Javanese wedding ceremonies and celebrations are explained quite extensively.
Within their first 40 days, Amongrogo taught her new bride Islamic teachings and perfect prayers. While in between, her mother taught her the right behavior toward her husband for successful marriage and misbehaviors which led to a failure of marriage.
Centhini is introduced for the first time within the story, Ni Tembangraras' maid who faithfully also listens to Amongrogo's teachings.
On the day after the 40th night, Amongrogo began to think about his sibling again and therefore asked permission from his wife to leave and to find his sibling. He promised to come back after he found his siblings and if he fails, he gave her permission to remarry. But Tembangraras could not bear his request and begged him to go with him. When the night came and she fell asleep, Amongrogo left the house and wrote her letters explaining why he should leave. Ni Ken Tembangraras and the whole family later realized Amongrogo's departure. They were all overwhelmed with sadness.

2. Amongrogo's quest to the eastern and southern part of Java Island.

From Wonomarto, Amongrogo and his attendants went eastward through Semeru Mountain and went all the way to the most eastern part of Java island (Blambangan region) before turned westward through southern coastal regions of Java Island. At one beach in Lumajang region, he saw an island in the Indian Ocean and decided to check it out. As they found out that the island, namely Nusabarong, gave them convenient food supply, they stayed there for 40 days. They went back to Java Island and continued their journey through several caves on the mountainous area in the southern part of East Java, through Mount Kelud to Mount Willis. In every meditation session, Amongrogo received a Lotus flower vision.

3. The legend of King Arjuna Sasrabahu

They arrived at Srobojo, a shortened name of Sosrobojo (another name of King Arjuna Sosrobahu). The legend says that King Arjuna arrived in the region from India while bringing his 800 wives and along the way, he selected more women to join his harem. King Arjuna then settled and built a Kingdom in Kabarehan, whose ruins became the city of ghosts and demons.

4. Introduction to the concept of reincarnation.

Amongrogo arrived and managed to climb Lawu Mountain. Succeeded in reaching the top, they went on to Condrodimuko Crater, a legendary place for torturing the sinners. Near the crater, Amongrogo meditated and he received a sign that he and his wife would live at a place called Terate-Bang. On their descending way, they visited Pringgodani, a legendary place (Arimbo's Kingdom) mentioned in Mahabarata Epic Javanese version. He met a Hindu hermit who introduced him to the concept of reincarnation.

5. Amongrogo's first followers from Lemah Abang village

Amongrogo and his attendants arrived at Lemah Abang Village. They spread Islam teaching and helped the locals to build a mosque. Amongrogo became the local's guru, called Kyai Ageng, and his followers grew in numbers.
However, his meditations along his journey gave him clues that in order to attain the perfection of his life, he has to meet his father's capturer, that is, Sultan Agung himself. Therefore, Amongrogo decided to continue his journey. He brought 300 santris with him to the southwest, to Mataram region.

6. Anticipation of encounters with Sultan Agung

Amongrogo, in anticipation of meeting with Sultan Agung, tried to reach him in his meditation places. Yet every time he arrives there, Sultan Agung would have just left the place.

7 The Mosque of Kanigoro

Failed to meet Sultan Agung several times, Amongrogo decided to get his attention. He built a mosque in Kanigoro region and performed magical shows in order to attract larger followers. The mosque indeed grew larger and gathered thousands of followers.

Journey of Jayengresmi, Jayengrogo and Kulowiryo

Fourteen months had passed since Seh Amongrogo left his father in-law (Ki Bayi) and his wife (Nyi Tembangraras). Finally came a decisive moment when Ki Bayi's brothers (Ki Jayengresmi and Ki Jayengrogo) and their uncle (Ki Kulowiryo) determined to look for and to catch up with Amongrogo. They departed, accompanied by Kulowiryo's attendant, Nuripin. Within their journey, they passed several villages, hermitages and caves. Ki Jayengrogo and Ki Kulowiryo are the morally loose characters as they did a lot of debauchery with the villagers, widowers and ronggeng dancers. Their carelessness sometimes brought them misfortune such as the loss of their possession. Ki Jayengresmi, being the only religious character among the group, always avoid the debauchery while patiently preach his brother and uncle. Nuripin is a character who is always bullied (yet always manage to escape and throw honest mockery on Kulowiryo's debauchery and his misfortune) by Kuliwiryo. The group only have a short distance of journey and they went back to Wonomarto empty handed and only received clues from all the hermits they met, that they would meet Amongrogo later on in a place called Wonontoko. Soon afterwards, santri Luci, who previously met Amongrogo, arrived at Wonomarto. Ki Luci told Ki Bayi and his family the summary of Amongrogo's journey and his whereabout. Within Amongrogo's journey, he kept having a vision of a lotus, which means, his search for the perfection of life would only be gained through Sultan Agung's help. Amongrogo tried to catch up with Sultan Agung by visiting his meditational places. But Sultan always leave just when Amongrogo arrives. Amongorogo then has to attract his attention by building a grand mosque at Kanigoro and performing magic show which gathered thousands of followers. The magical shows which drew thousands of followers finally was being noticed Sultan Agung. He concluded that such activity was breaking Islamic law and therefore he sentenced Amongorogo for death penalty by drowning him to an ocean. Amongrogo was being executed. The death penalty is actually what Amongrogo's looking for from Sultan Agung. As by went through death, he wasn't really dead, he only moved to another realm (reverse realm/incorporeal world/jagad walikan in javanese). Therefore, right on entering incorporeal world, he thanked Sultan Agung instead.

The debauchery scenes of this section is what makes Serat Centhini famous of its porn contents which unfortunately often overshadow the other knowledge being elaborated.

Nyi Selobrangti and Cethi Centhini Reunite

Soon after receiving bad news about his husband, Nyi Tembangraras determined to find his husband herself. She changed her name to Nyi Selobrangti and accompanied by her faithful maid, Centhini. Both of them arrived at Wonontoko and accidentally met Ki Amongrogo's long time separated brother and sister, Ki Mangunkarso/Jayengsari and Nyi Rancangkapti. Soon after the surprising reunion, Nyi Selobrangti told them the bad news about Ki Amongrogo's death. The news shocked them and all of them fainted and died. Ki Amongrogo, in his realm, noticed the unfortunate event. He visited Wonontoko and revived everyone. The horrible scene now become a happy ending for the brother and sister and the wife. The couple finally reunited and later on built a hermitage but in the reverse realm.incorporeal world. At this point Ki Bayi's brothers, Jayengresmi and Jayengrogo, left Wonomarto once again to find their niece, Nyi Tembangraras/Selobrangti and Centhini. In the middle of their journey, they received a message from Ki Montel (Amongrogo's attendant) that Tembangraras had met her husband and that they had lived together in Wonontoko in a specific place called Jurang-Jangkung. Jayengrogo and Jayengresmi delighted to hear the news. They decided to meditate at Ardipolo hermitage while Ki Montel delivered the good news to Ki Bayi and his wife.

=== Post-adulthood journey ===
A Reunion of Ki Bayu and his wife with their daughter Nyi Tembangraras and Seh Amongrogo

Ki Bayi and his wife, Nyi Malaresmi, were eager to meet their daughter therefore they set forth to Wonontoko. By the end of the journey they met Ki Mangukarso (Amongrogo's brother) who told them that they would be able to meet Tembangraras and Amongrogo only in incorporeal world and through a meditation at jurang-jangkung. They went to Jurang-Jangkung and meditate. On the third night, they finally met Seh Amongorogo and Nyi Tembangraras in the incorporeal world. The short reunion however had to come to an end. Ki Bayi and his wife returned to Wonomarto, this time, with a happy and content feeling.

The Island of Black Marble

Seh Amongrogo and Nyi Tembangraras, within their incorporeal world, made a journey to Banten, West Java. They arrived at a dreadful beach therefore he changed it into a tranquil one. He then built an island made of black marble, filled it with precious stones, built a house and stayed there with his wife. It wasn't long before the news of an island of black marble reached a powerful man from Sumatra Island, Ki Datuk. He confronted Seh Amongrogo by put him into test. If indeed Amongrogo is a generous figure, he won't say no to whatever Ki Datuk is asking, even asking for his wife. To Ki Datuk's surprise, Amongrogo gave away his wife. Tembangraras and Ki Datuk's ship was ready on sail returning to Sumatra but in the middle of the ocean, the weather became fierce and the ship sank. Ki Datuk and his sailors was being rescued and they arrived back home empty handed. Meanwhile, Nyi Tembangraras was being pickekup by Seh Amongrogo and they return to Wonontoko, leaving the Black Marble Island and its beach to its original dreadful state.

The Wonder Maggots and the End of Seh Amongrogo and Nyi Tembangraras' Life Journey

Serat Centhini ends with a famous story of wonder maggots. Seh amongrogo and Nyi Tembangraras wished to go back to the real world in order to put discipline to the people and that it can be done through Sultan Agung's lineage. In the meantime, Sultan Agung, in his old age, had become a priest namely Priest Anyokrokusumo. Seh Amongrogo and Nyi Tembangraras met him through incorporeal world and the three of them agreed to make an arrangement. The deal was, Seh Amongrogo and Nyo Tembangraras were changed into wonder male and female maggots. The female maggots was eaten by Sultan Agung, while the female maggot was eaten by Pangeran Pekik (Sultan Agung's brother-in-law). Later on, the son of Sultan Agung (the reincarnation of Seh Amongrogo) would marry Pangeran Pekik's daughter (as reincarnation of Nyi Tembangraras) and they would have a son who would become the King of Mataram, namely Amangkurat. In his reign, Amangkurat didn't please his people because of the discipline being applied. One prince, Raden Trunojoyo, rebelled against him, on behalf of Amangkurat's son. Amangkurat was then being exiled to a place which has a fragrant soil (Tegalarum). This means that Seh Amongrogo and Nyi Tembangraras had arrived at the end of their lives' journey, from their birth to their death.

== Evolution of the Javanese knowledge (kawruh) in the modern time ==
Colonial time

Modernity and science that were being brought by the Europeans created a paradigm shift in the kind of knowledge and the way to attain knowledge within Javanese society. The concept of 'time is money' was being introduced in which Javanese society have to adjust to a new regular working culture in contrast to the regularity of an agricultural work. Schools in new institutions in new towns were being introduced to public via Colonial Ethical Policy in contrast with the way ancient schools was being conducted through hermitages or in exclusive royal/palace circles. The kind of knowledge is also shifting from heavily mysticism knowledge to heavily rational kind of knowledge. In Shiva-Hindu Catur Asrama, wanderers are part of the way of life and to attain knowledge. In the colonial period the wanderers become unwanted people in new town such as Batavia. The wanderers often evolve into independent rebels or local heroes such as being popularized by The Legend of Si Pitung or Prince Diponegoro's guerrilla volunteers from Bagelen. During the independence war, the rebels play a bigger role in the guerrilla movement.

Post Independence

Javanese knowledge remains in the form of traditions that are being passed down through generations. Especially in the area of philosophy, traditional medicine, wedding procession and religion.

- Philosophies are actively being passed down by parents, society and leadership/government/military institutions. Sometime they are being popularized via newspaper's satire or comedy talk show by local media. Example of Javanese popular philosophies are:

- Eling LAN Waspada: Be conscious of who we are in regards to our creator and to the people AND be alert in avoiding any wrongdoings
- Ing Ngarsa Sung Tulada, Ing Madya Mangun Karsa, Tut Wuri Handayani: In the forefront leaders should give good example, in the middle among the people leaders should work with the people, from the rear leaders should give support and motivation.
- Bibit Bobot Bebet: In selecting spouse, use the measurement of Bibit (consider his/her family background and good name), Bobot (consider his/her good education and strong morals) and Bebet (Javanese is a paternalistic society, hence, the wife should consider that her prospective husband can be relied as a breadwinner/provider for the family)
- Alon alon asal kelakon: carefulness and safety should be prioritized, do not do any work in a careless way

- Religious ceremonies are still conducted by today's Yogayakarta Sultanate and its people such as sekaten, Satu Suro ceremony, Labuhan ceremony at Parangtritis beach (offering from the Yogyakarta Sultanate to the South Ocean Queen)
- Ceremonies of a full life cycle (pregnancy, baby, wedding, after death) are being practiced more widely by Javanese society even in big modern cities.

- Pregnancy: Mitoni (7 month pregnancy)
- Baby ceremonies: Tedhak Siten
- Wedding: Midodareni night, Siraman
- After death: ceremonies of 7th, 40th, 100th and 1000th days after one's death

- Arts and traditional performance. Unfortunately throughout modern time, traditional performances gradually have been marginalized by modern and pop culture. They are however still largely being performed throughout Java villages, hence, its connotation with plebeian and tacky performance. The loosely erotic dances in Ronggeng, Gandrung or Tayuban including drinking and being drunk is being partially limited by Moslem-style authorities e.g. the clothing should be more enclosed, saweran (the act of slipping money into the dancer's wardrobe) is handed down through scarf and alcohol is prohibited. Erotic dances, however, transformed in another kind of popular performances namely dangdut and its subgenre development dangdut koplo.

Recently, suffered by cases of claims by neighboring country over some Indonesian local performances, Indonesian had begun to pay more attention and to safeguard Indonesian traditional heritage. More directors and artists start to improvise by packaging traditional arts with modern one e.g. Javanese Bossanova music, Wayang performances are being presented as operas.

- Mysticism. As rationality dominate the way of thinking of modern society, mysticism also has been marginalized to mysterious plebeian clubs, fortune tellers and shaman. Popular culture reduce its existence to tacky horror movies. Broadcasting media popularize it through reality TV shows.

However globalization (fueled by the use of internet) and democracy helps grass root who still care on bringing back the honorable meaning of mysticism into Javanese society.

- Architecture. Joglo architecture is still being preserve. However, it is more popular for designing public or government building.
