= Ngliyep Beach =

Beach

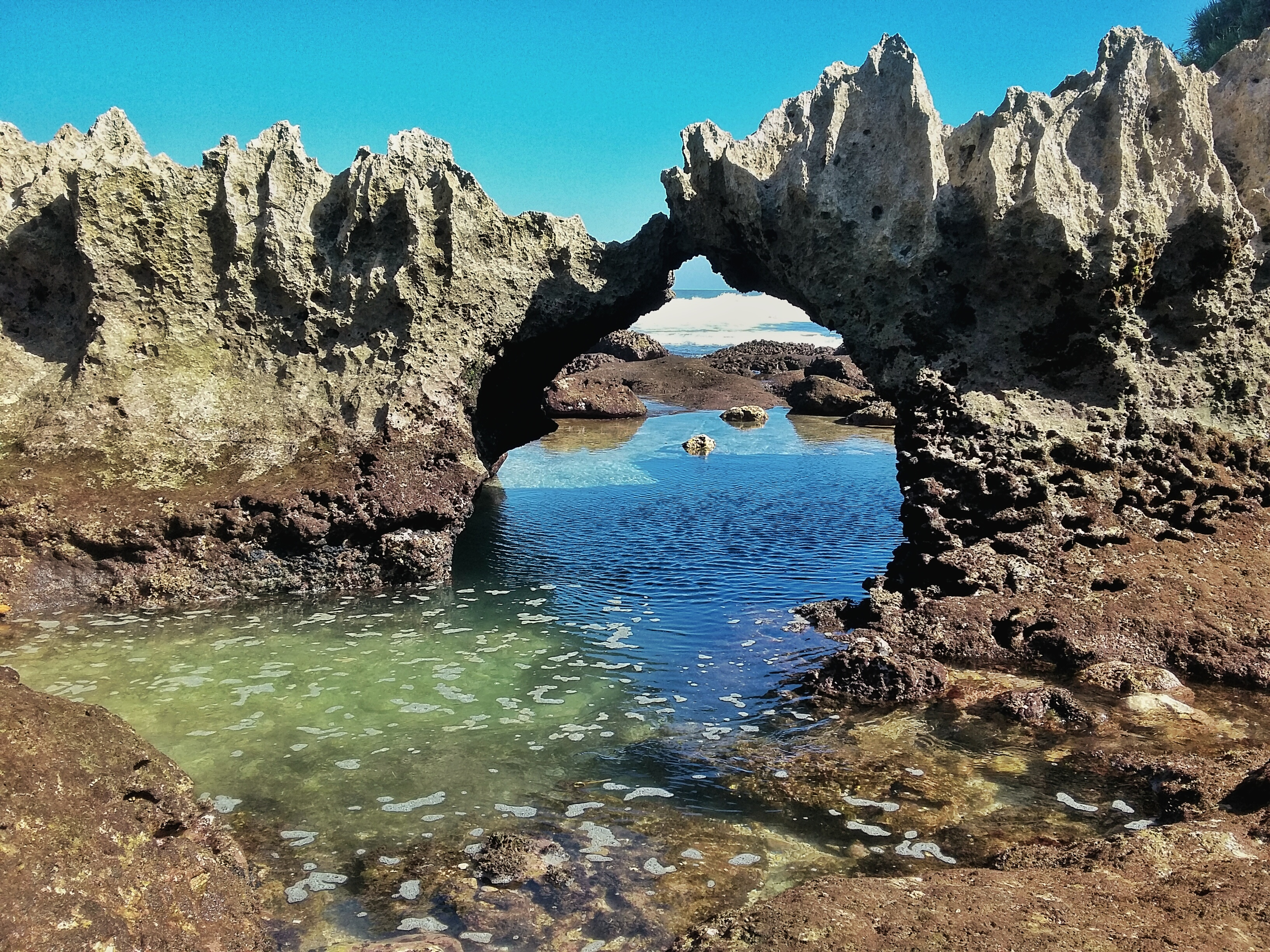
Karang Bolong, Ngliyep Beach

Ngliyep Beach (Donomulyo Beach) is a beach located in Indonesia. It is situated in the village of Kedungsalam Donomulyo, Malang Regency, 62 km south of Malang. Each year, a ritual ceremony called the Folk Art. Batik is used for sacrificial rituals. Farm animals such as sheep or cows are sacrificed into the sea as a ritual offering. This beach is unsafe for swimming because of strong waves.

== Myths ==
In the coastal region, Kumbang Mountain is believed to be the Queen's favorite place to meditate. The Queen of the South Coast or Nyai Roro Kidul is an Indonesian goddess of the sea.
