= Parangtritis =

Beach in Bantul, Yogyakarta, Indonesia

Coordinates: 8°01′S 110°21′E

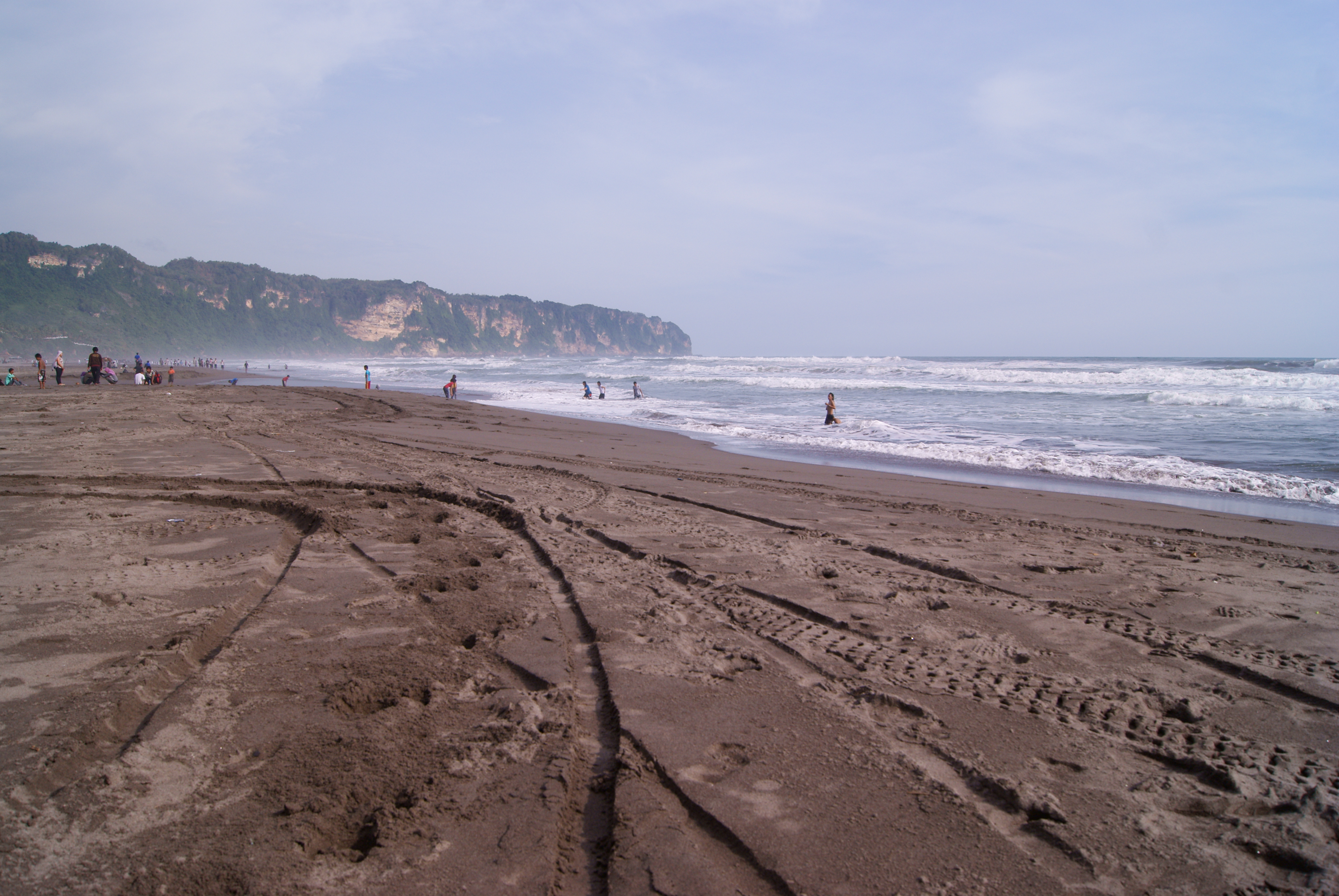
Parangtritis Beach in 2011

Parangtritis Beach (Indonesian: Pantai Parangtritis, Javanese: ꦥꦱꦶꦱꦶꦂꦥꦫꦁꦠꦿꦶꦠꦶꦱ꧀, romanized: Pasisir Parangtritis) is a tourist beach on the southern coast of Java, in the Bantul Regency within the Special Region of Yogyakarta, Indonesia. There is a road to the area which is about 30 km (19 miles) south of the city of Yogyakarta. This beach is located south of Parangkusumo Beach, which is also a mainstay of tourism in Bantul Regency. This beach is often visited by local and foreign tourists.

== Facilities and attractions ==
Quite large crowds of mainly local tourists visit Parangtritis over weekends and at holidays. Larger tourist buses as well as various types of cheaper minibuses ply the route to the beach from Yogyakarta. There are local tourist facilities at Parangtritis including parking arrangements, modest hotels which provide visitors with places to change and shower, and small restaurants. Often small ponies or horse-drawn carts can be hired for rides along the beach. Tourists also visit some of the various caves and springs in the cliffs and hills near Parangtritis, such as the Tapan cave and the Beji spring, which are quite close to the beach.

== Myths and folklore ==
Parangtritis is sometimes said to be a place to meet the legendary Nyai Loro Kidul (also known as Ratu Kidul) or 'Queen of the South Sea'. Local folklore warns visitors not to wear green clothes or the queen is likely to try to entice the wearer into the ocean to drown. The beach is not really a good swimming beach. Drownings are not uncommon at Parangtritis, partly because many Indonesians have never had the opportunity to learn proper swimming technique at beach and partly because channels, strong rips and sizable waves often occur off the beach.

== Gallery ==
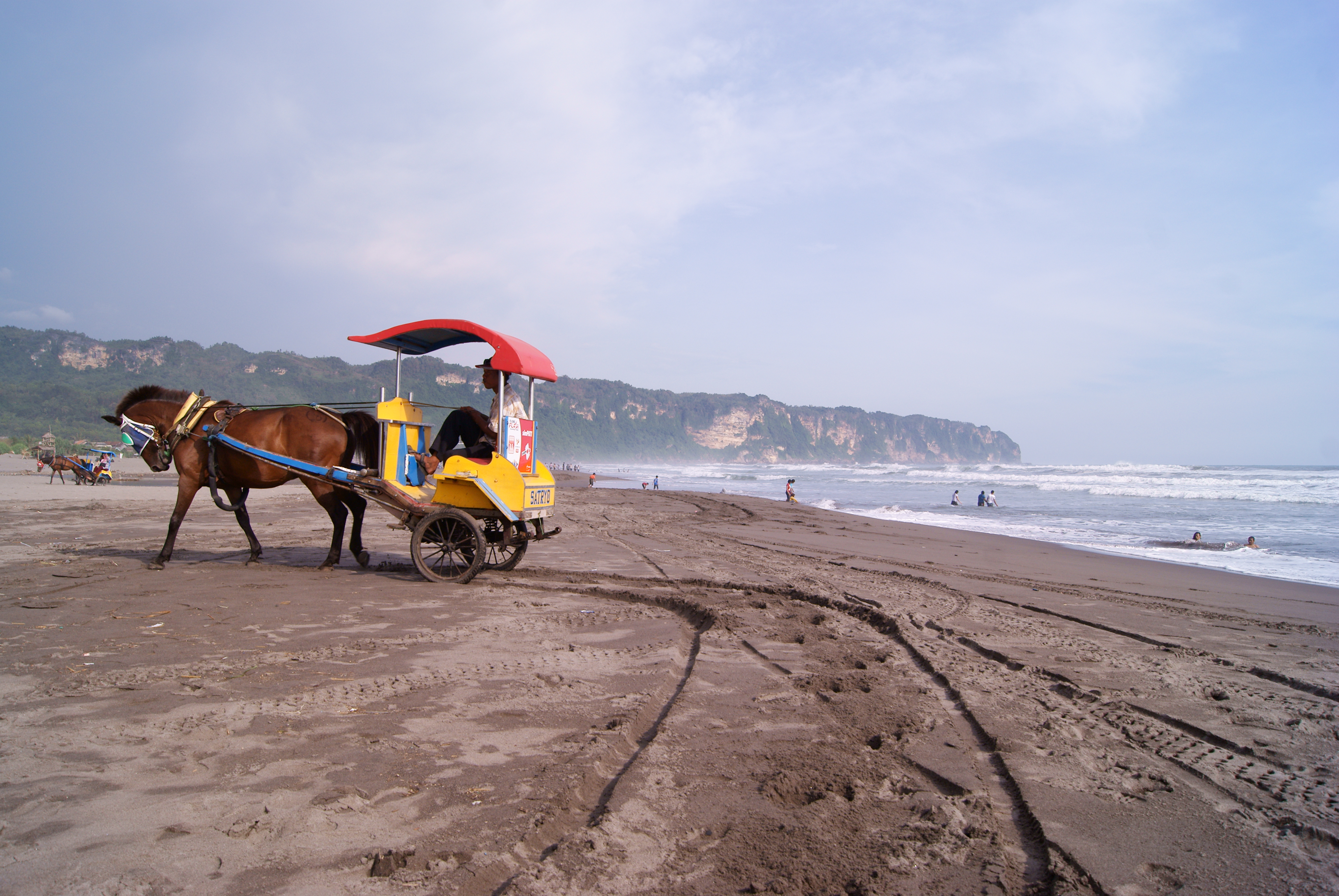
Horse carriage, as the identity of Parangtritis Beach.

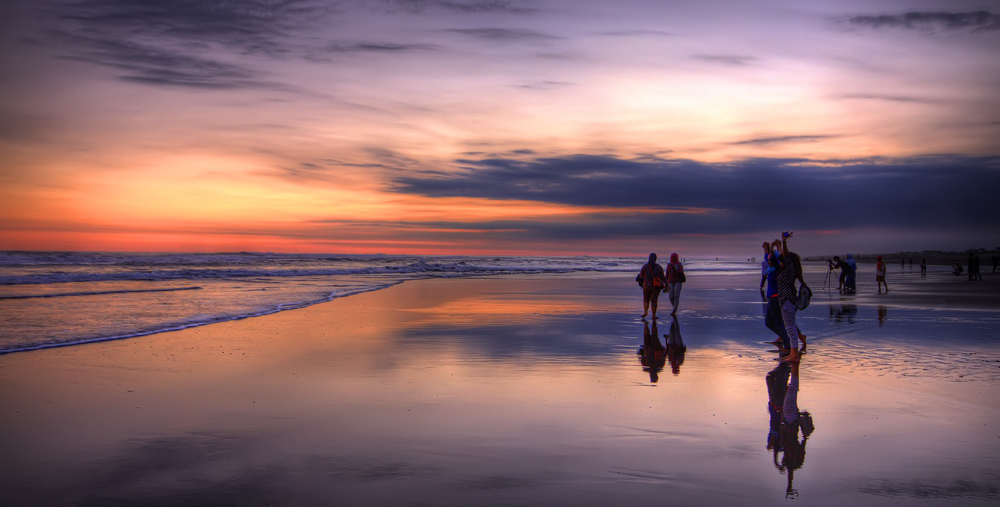
Sunset at Parangtritis Beach, Bantul.

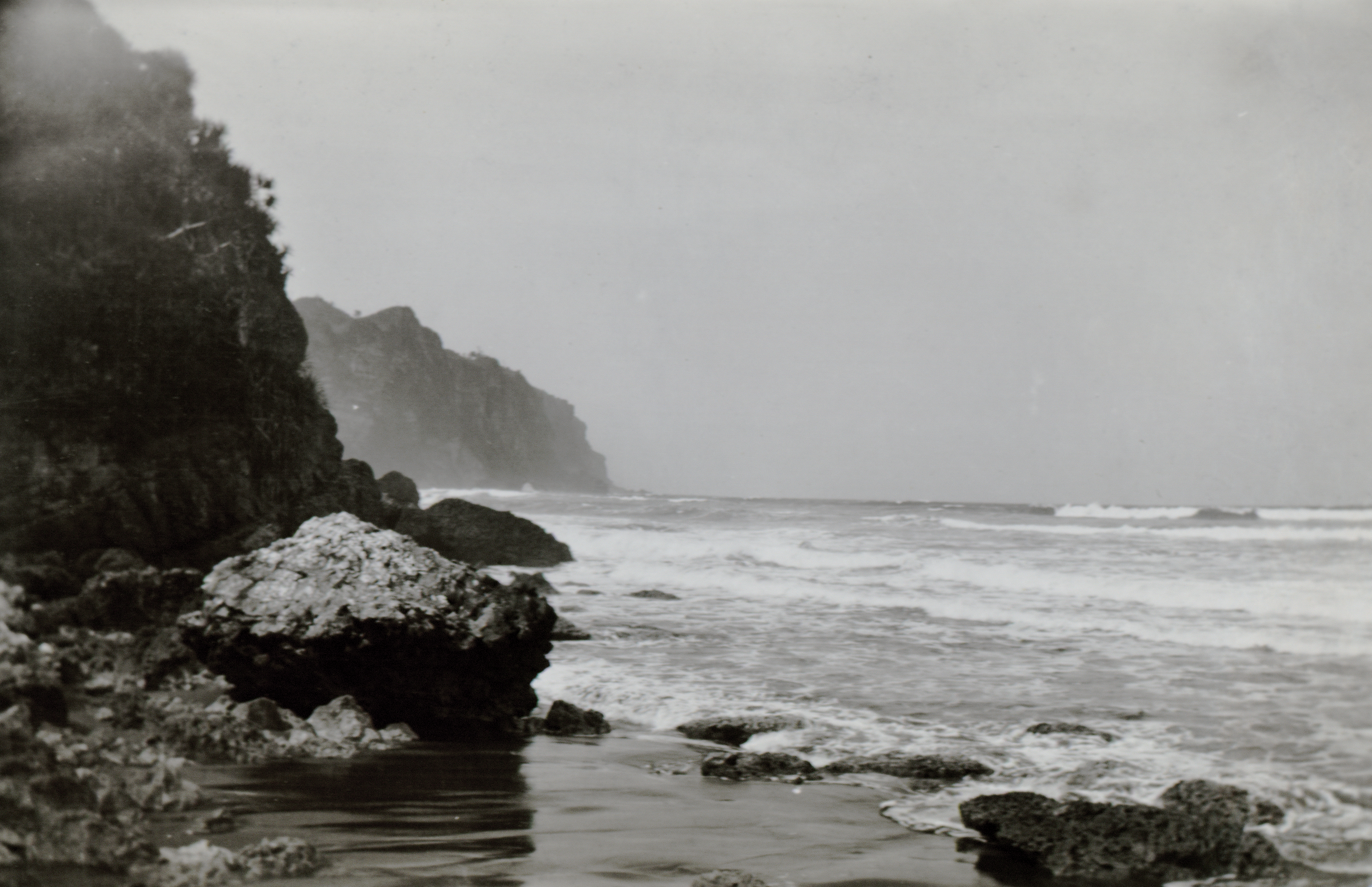
Parangtritis Beach, circa 1925.

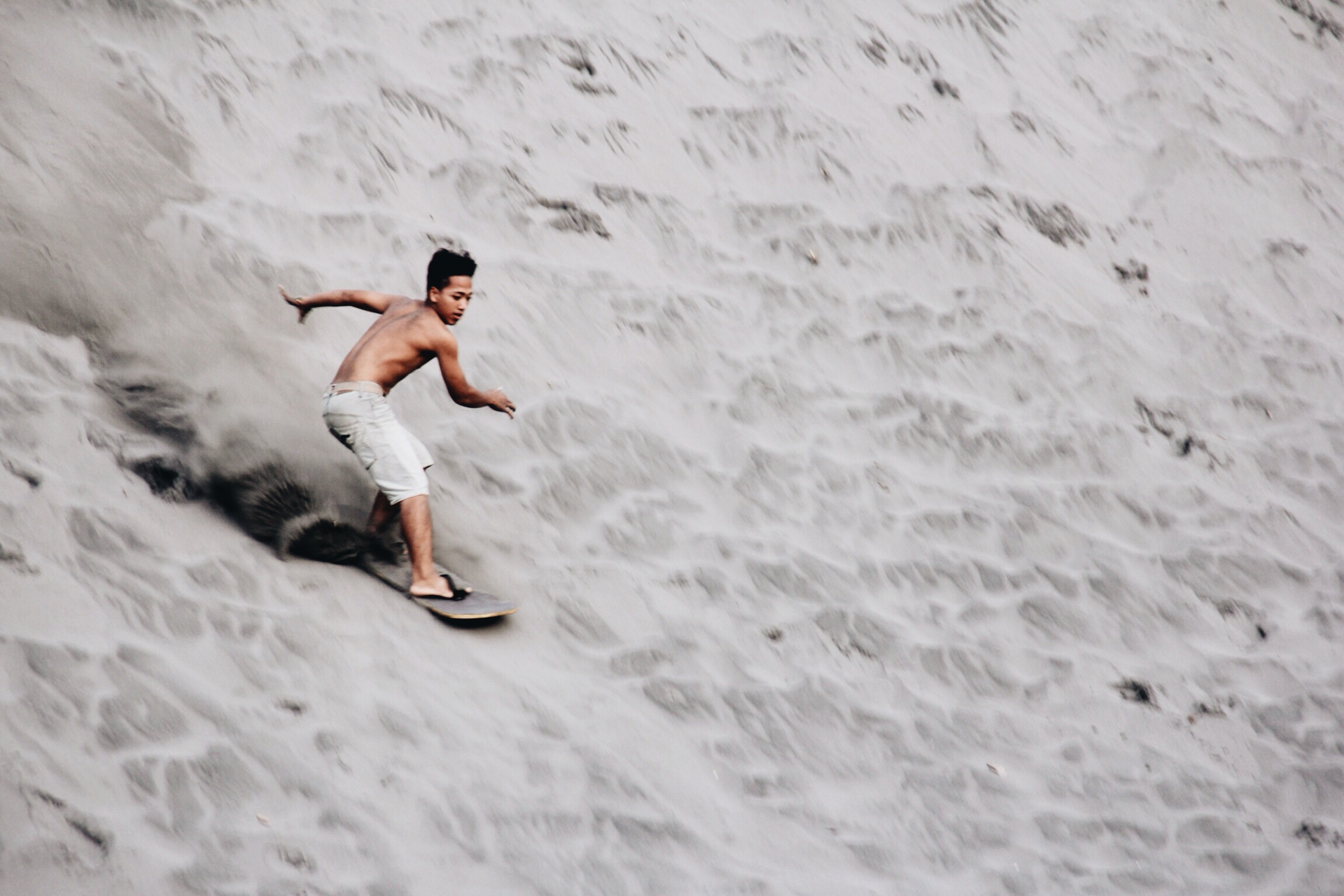
Sandboarding at Parangtritis Beach.

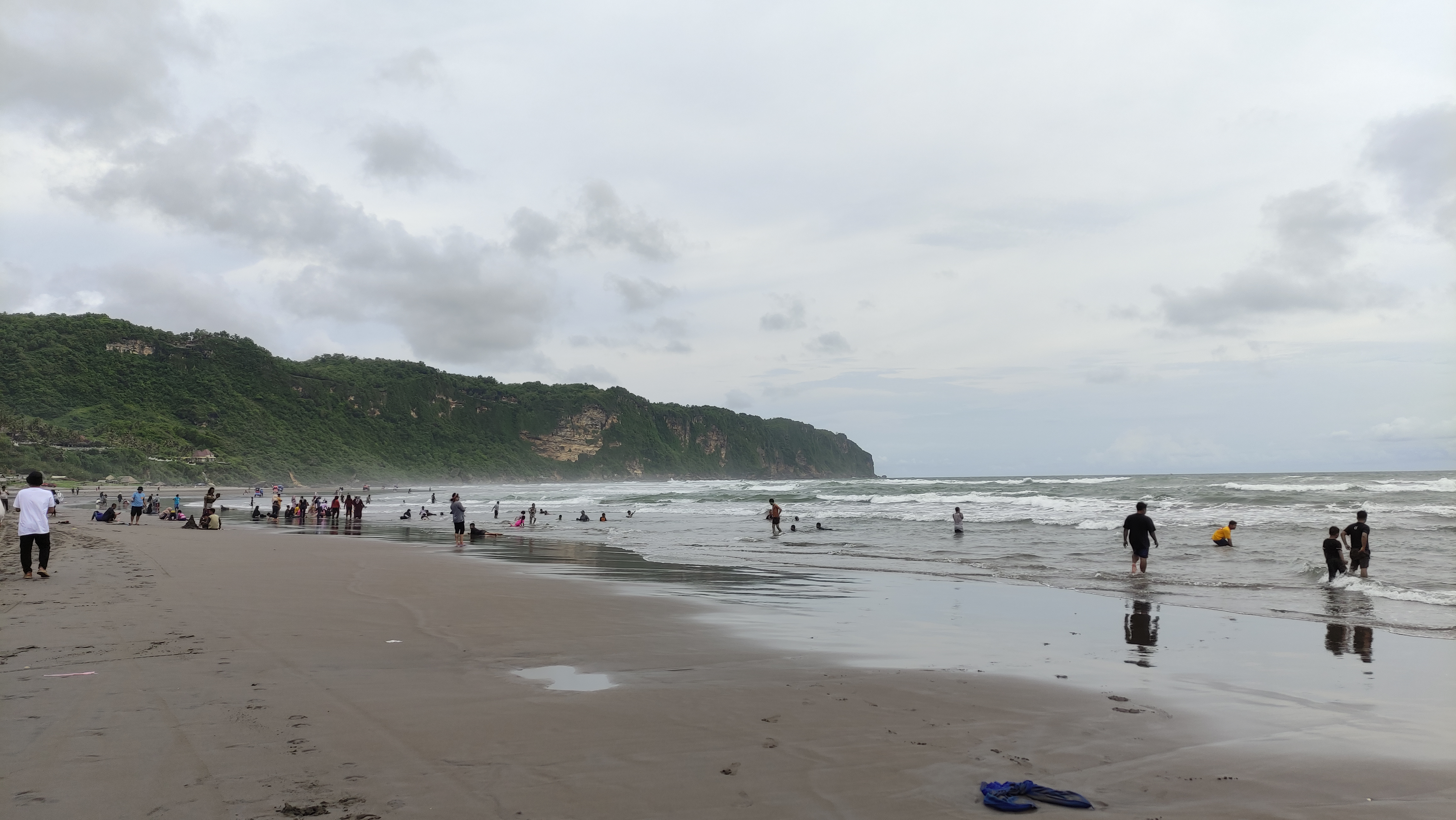
Panorama of Parangtritis Beach on a cloudy afternoon.

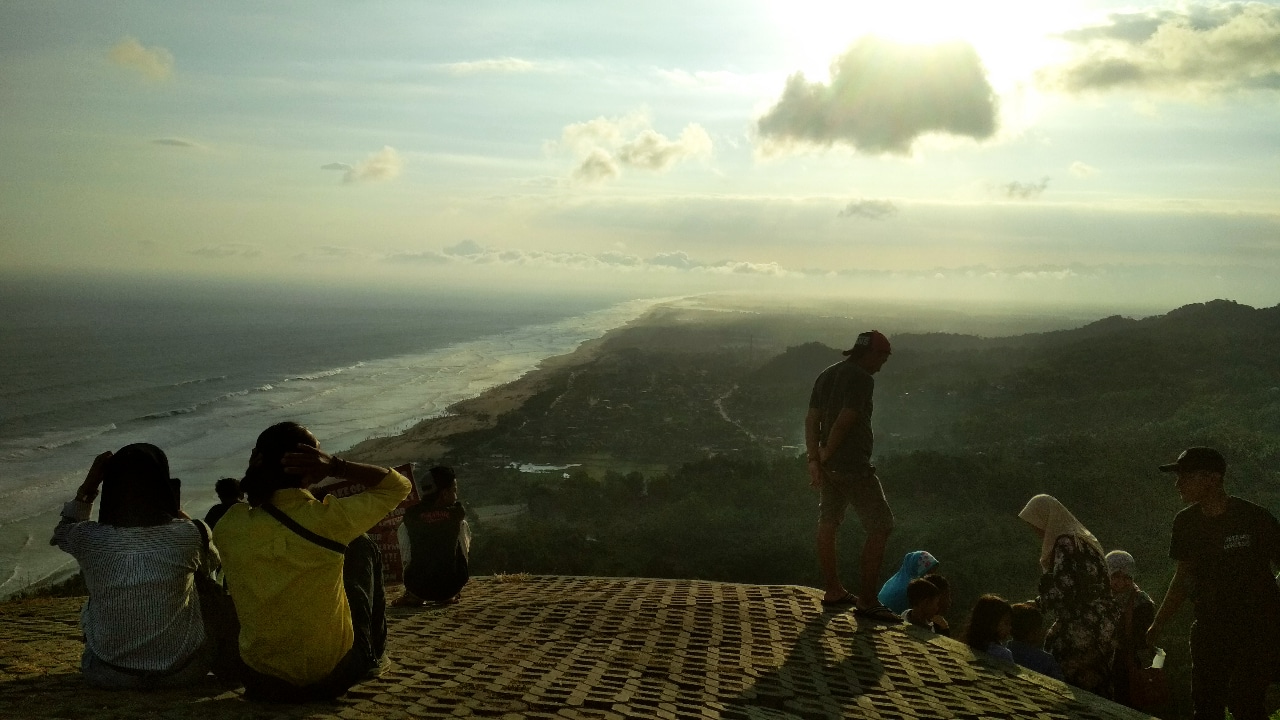
View of the coast of Parangtritis Beach seen from Paralayang Watugupit Peak.

== See also ==
- Parangtritis Beach in Indonesian
- Bantul Regency
- Javanese sacred places
