= Semerah =

Town in Malaysia

- Town in Malaysia

Other transcription(s)
  - Jawi: سميره
  - Chinese: 圣模那
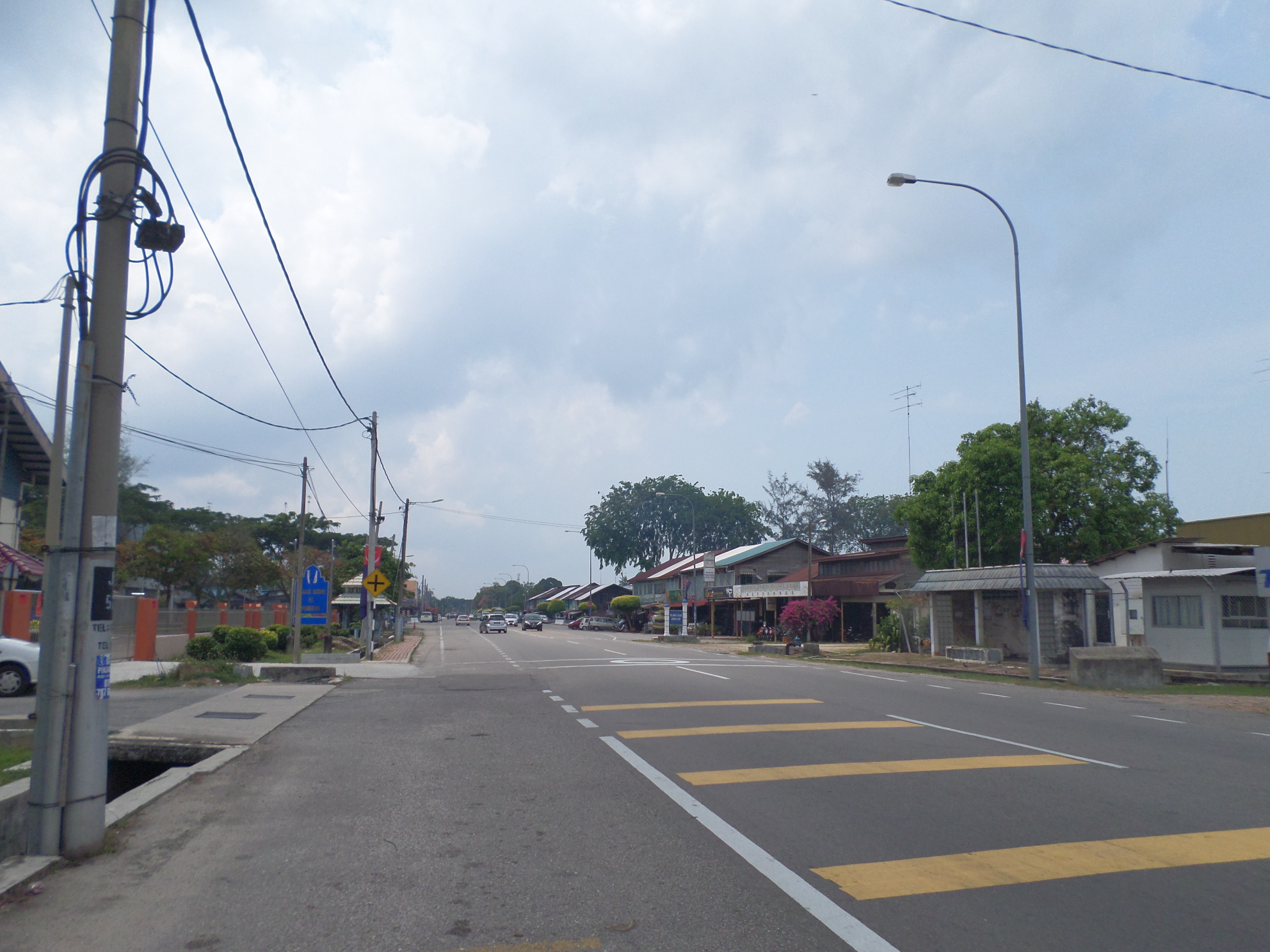
- Semerah

- Semerah in Johor, Malay Peninsular and Malaysia Semerah (Peninsular Malaysia) Semerah (Malaysia)
- Coordinates: 1°52′56.59″N 102°46′57.95″E
- Country: Malaysia
- State: Johor
- District: Batu Pahat; Muar
- Time zone: UTC+8 (MYT)
- Postal code: 83000; 83600

Semerah (Jawi; سميره; Chinese: 圣模那) is a town in both Batu Pahat District and Muar District in Johor, Malaysia.

This town is basically a main street with old shophouses and a road to Semerah wet market (Pasar Semerah). They are mainly wooden structures with little or no civil foundation; some were rebuilt into concrete structures after fire damage or own effort. The east part of Semereh is within Muar town. There is a prominent Chinese Temple known as Tokong Kwang Yim Keng which was established before 1938, it is a prominent landmark and tourist attraction for the town.

== Villages ==
- Sarang Buaya
