= Dewi Lanjar =

Indonesian goddess of the sea

Dewi Lanjar is an Indonesian goddess of the sea, the opposite of Nyai Roro Kidul and the Queen of the Northern Sea, according to Javanese beliefs. She is a popular goddess in the city of Pekalongan, Central Java. Her name, "Lanjar", means a woman who is divorced and has no children.

== Veneration ==
The people of Pekalongan in particular still have a strong belief in Dewi Lanjar. For example, if a child goes missing at the beach, people believe that the child was taken by Dewi Lanjar. It is said that her palace is located on the beach of Pekalongan, next to the Slamaran river.

== Origin ==
In ancient times in Pekalongan there lived a beautiful princess named Dewi Rara Kuning. She had been a widow at a very young age because her husband died some time after their marriage. That is why Dewi Rara Kuning was then known as Dewi Lanjar. Dewi Lanjar decided to leave her hometown to avoid being constantly consumed with grief.

On arrival at the Opak river, she met the king of Mataram, Panembahan Senopati together with Mahapatih Singaranu in the midst of their ascetic meditation. Dewi Lanjar expressed her heart and said she would never marry again. Panembahan Senopati and Mahapatih Singoranu, both feeling pity towards her, advised her to go to the south beach to meditate and face the queen of the Southern Sea. Then they parted. Dewi Lanjar headed towards the South Beach. She meditated diligently achieving moksa and met with queen of the Southern Sea.

During the meeting, Dewi Lanjar begged the queen to be her follower, which Nyi Roro Kidul agreed. One day, Dewi Lanjar with the jinn troops was commanded to disrupt and prevent Raden Bahu from opening Gambiren forest (now located around the bridge of Pekalongan and Sorogenen village). However, Raden Bahu was unaffected by the temptations of Dewi Lanjar and the jinn. Unable to fulfill the task, Dewi Lanjar decided not to return to the South Beach, but requested permission to Raden Bahu to be able to reside in Pekalongan. It is approved by both Raden Bahu and even the queen of Southern Sea. Dewi Lanjar was allowed to stay and rule the North Beach especially in Pekalongan, Central Java.
