= Saranga =

Saranga may refer to:

- Sharnga, the celestial bow of the Hindu god Vishnu
- Saranga (1961 film), an Indian Hindi-language romance film by Dhirubhai Desai, starring Sudesh Kumar and Jayshree Gadkar
- Saranga (1994 film), a Pakistani action film
- Șarânga, a village in the commune of Pietroasele, Romania
- David Saranga (born 1964), Israel’s ambassador in Romania

== See also ==
- Sarang (disambiguation)
- Sarangapani (disambiguation)
- Sharangapani (disambiguation)
