= Sharangapani =

Sharangapani is a popular epithet of the Hindu god Vishnu. It means "one who holds the sharanga bow in his hand".

Sharangapani may also refer to:

- Sarangapani Temple, a temple of Vishnu in Kumbakonam, Tamil Nadu, India
- P. K. Sarangapani (1925–2011), Indian screenwriter and playwright in Malayalam
- Thamizhavel G. Sarangapani, Indian-Singaporean writer in Tamil and founder of the Tamil Murasu newspaper

== See also ==
- Sarangapani (disambiguation)
- Saranga (disambiguation)
