= Sarang Buaya River =

River of Johor, Malaysia

The Sarang Buaya River (Malay: Sungai Sarang Buaya) is a river in Johor, Malaysia.

== See also ==
- Sarang Buaya
