= Community Radio Sarang =

Radio station in Karnataka, India

Community Radio Sarang is managed by the Mangalore Jesuit Educational Society (MJES) and is run by St. Aloysius College (Autonomous), Mangalore, a coastal town in the southern part of Karnataka, India. It was established in September 2009 by Dr Richard Rego SJ who is known as the founder of this campus based community radio. Though SARANG 107.8 FM is a campus radio, it is more of a community-participating radio than educational institution radio. Quantitatively, approximately 95% of the content is produced by and with the local community or by health and legal workers for communities.

Sarang means 'harmony of colours' signifying various social, religious, linguistic communities and their peaceful coexistence at coastal Karnataka. Mangalore community is a melting pot of cultures, religions and languages. Hence, it was felt that Sarang would be the most appropriate name. Presently, Radio Sarang broadcasts for 16 hours, with its app broadcasting for 24 hours.

== Audience and contributors ==
It began as a two hours radio programme. Later it became 24x7 Community radio with, for and by local people such as farmers, fisher-folk, patients, vendors, students, medical and legal experts, service providers like bicycle mechanics, small vendors, cobblers, and people with different abilities. The local communities contribute regularly to this radio. The radio also spreads messages of peace and harmony among people through programs based on the need for the same specially during celebrations and when such need is felt. Today it has 16 hours of daily programmes ranging from educational to social to health and cultural issues and aspects.

The programs are produced -mostly- by the local community and also by staff, students of mass communication and other students of St Aloysius College and neighboring schools and colleges.

== Programming ==
Subjects of Radio Sarang programming include health and hygiene, sanitation, agriculture, education, fisher-folk issues, road safety, water conservation, rain water harvesting, folk culture and life, and women and children's rights. Original entertainment by locals are the hallmark of this radio. The program formats include talks, interviews, phone-ins, songs, poetry, stories, and chat-shows.

Community Radio SARANG 107.8FM broadcasts in Konkani, Kannada, Tulu, and Beary languages daily. On 15 June 2010, Community Radio SARANG 107.8FM started broadcasting 14 hours non-stop, from 6.30 to 20.30 hours, which is reduced now for 16 hours per day from 6' am till 10' pm.

At the hour of adversity, Community Radio SARANG has always taken major risks, turning its limitations into strengths. For example, when one of its transmitters broke down in 2011, the broadcast was further increased to 18 hours a day from 5.00 a.m. to 11.00 p.m., on 24 June, the day first signals of the Community Radio SARANG went on air, on a trial basis in 2009. In the next one month (In July 2011), Community Radio SARANG 107.8FM became the only community radio in India broadcasting 24 hours a day!.

On 15 August 2010 (India's Independence Day) Community Radio SARANG 107.8 MHz created a new record by broadcasting live for 14-continuous hours, a record repeated on 14 August 2012, this time including on-the-spot reporting using mobile telephony, from the field, reporting live hoisting of the National Flag, by village communities.

Initially, Radio SARANG had four real-time live phone-in "shows" every day: Some of them still prevail

- Three-times daily "Maadhyama Harate" (live media review program), with a special emphasis on job opportunities and special assistance available for rural communities in the public domain.
- Manassina Maathu (Whispers of the Heart) by an auto-driver who host this show in Tulu and Kannada. It is an open talk-show
- Aadu Aata Aadu (Come, Let's Play) – an entertaining show
- Janadani (People's Voice) – where local community spontaneously discusses its issues freely
- Prathidwhani (Echo) – a weekly show with corporators and elected representatives of local bodies, during which people raise their concerns and public issues. One of the very effective talk shows, whose effects are already felt in the successful completion of public works like road repair.
- Olavina Haadu (A Song of Love) – musical show with community participating in song selection (light and folk music)
- Tulu Chaavadi (Tulu Corridor) – with a volunteer Thimmappa. The show showcases the rich cultural heritage of Tulu language -an endangered language (http://www.deccanherald.com/content/12657/tulu-kodava-vanishing-unesco.html)
- Kelugara Dhwani (Voice of the Listeners) – Listener feed back through SMS, calls, emails, and letters. It is a weekly round up of listeners' opinion on Radio SARANG 107.8FM.
- Sarang Special – Weekly Show on People's choice of best of SARANG programs and listener request.
- Korike Nimmadu Haadu Nammadu (Your Request, Our Song; weekly)- People's request on best of Radio SARANG's local music.
- Kaanoonu Kacheri (Legal Cell) phone-in in collaboration with a local law college and advocates
- Arogya Sparsha (health live phone-in with a medical centre)
- Arogya SARANG (live phone with another medical centre)

On 25 May, SARANG trained 14 women from the Mangalore's rural communities in radio program presentation (RJ). Between 12 and 17 December 2011, Radio SARANG trained 26 local women in radio program presentation. The program was sponsored by the Department of Science of Technology's NSTC, Govt. of India, New Delhi. A special feature of the program was the program (HIV-AIDS) made my local Muslim women in Beary language secured the Second Prize at the National Level at the Radio Program Competition, February 2012. The Competition was held by the Ministry of Information and Broadcasting, Govt of India ().

In June 2012, it also started broadcasting a regular program on Koraga culture – a small backward community of Karnataka.

== Awards ==
Community Radio Sarang has won three national awards, the most recent being in 2018 for its programme called "Antarabelaku", a feature on visually challenged persons, most of whom are Sarang listeners (https://www.youtube.com/watch?v=BppSVUSLGXI).
