= Sarang-e Sofla =

Sarang-e Sofla سارنگ سفلي
- Village
- Location within Iran
- Coordinates: 34°08′30″N 58°35′05″E
- Country: Iran
- Province: Razavi Khorasan
- County: Gonabad
- Bakhsh: Kakhk
- Rural District: Kakhk

Population (2006)
  - Total: 55
- Time zone: UTC+3:30 (IRST)
  - Summer (DST): UTC+4:30 (IRDT)

Sarang-e Sofla (Persian: سارنگ سفلي, also Romanized as Sārang-e Soflá; also known as Sārang-e Pā’īn and Sārang) is a village in Kakhk Rural District, Kakhk District, Gonabad County, Razavi Khorasan Province, Iran. At the 2006 census, its population was 55, in 21 families.
