= Sarangapanipettai =

Coordinates: 10°59′N 79°25′E

- village
- Interactive map of Sarangapanipettai
- Country: India
- State: Tamil Nadu
- District: Thanjavur
- Taluk: Kumbakonam

Population (2001)
  - Total: 428

Languages
  - Official: Tamil
- Time zone: UTC+5:30 (IST)

Sarangapanipettai is a village in the Kumbakonam taluk of Thanjavur district, Tamil Nadu, India.

== Demographics ==
As per the 2001 census, Sarangapanipettai had a total population of 428 with 233 males and 195 females. The literacy rate was 79.47%
