= Sarang Buaya =

Coordinates: 1°53′30.4″N 102°46′01.1″E

Sarang Buaya or Kampung Sarang Buaya is a tourist village in Semerah, Muar District, Johor, Malaysia. It hosts a crocodile sanctuary.
