= Karang Bolong Beach (Anyer) =

Karang Bolong
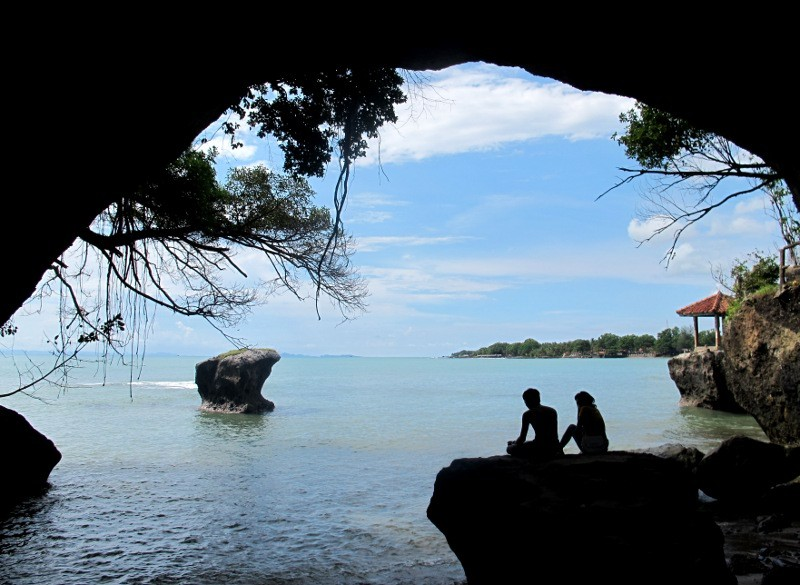
- Karang Bolong

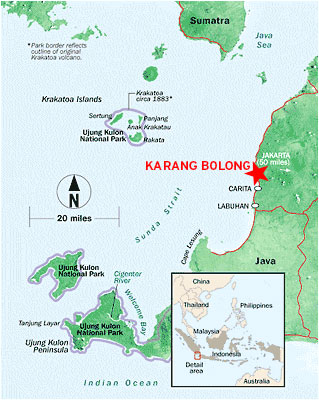
- Location in the coast of West Java
- Coordinates: 6°10.024′S 105°51.039′E
- Country: Indonesia
- Province: Karang Bolong

Karang Bolong (pronounced Ka•Rang-Boh•Lohng) is located on the coast of Anyer, Banten, Indonesia.

The name Karang Bolong means Rock (Karang) with a Hole (Bolong). The mountain was created by frozen lava, formed during the eruption of Mount Krakatau. Karang Bolong beach is located 50 km from Serang town or 140 km from Jakarta, on Karang Bolong Street.

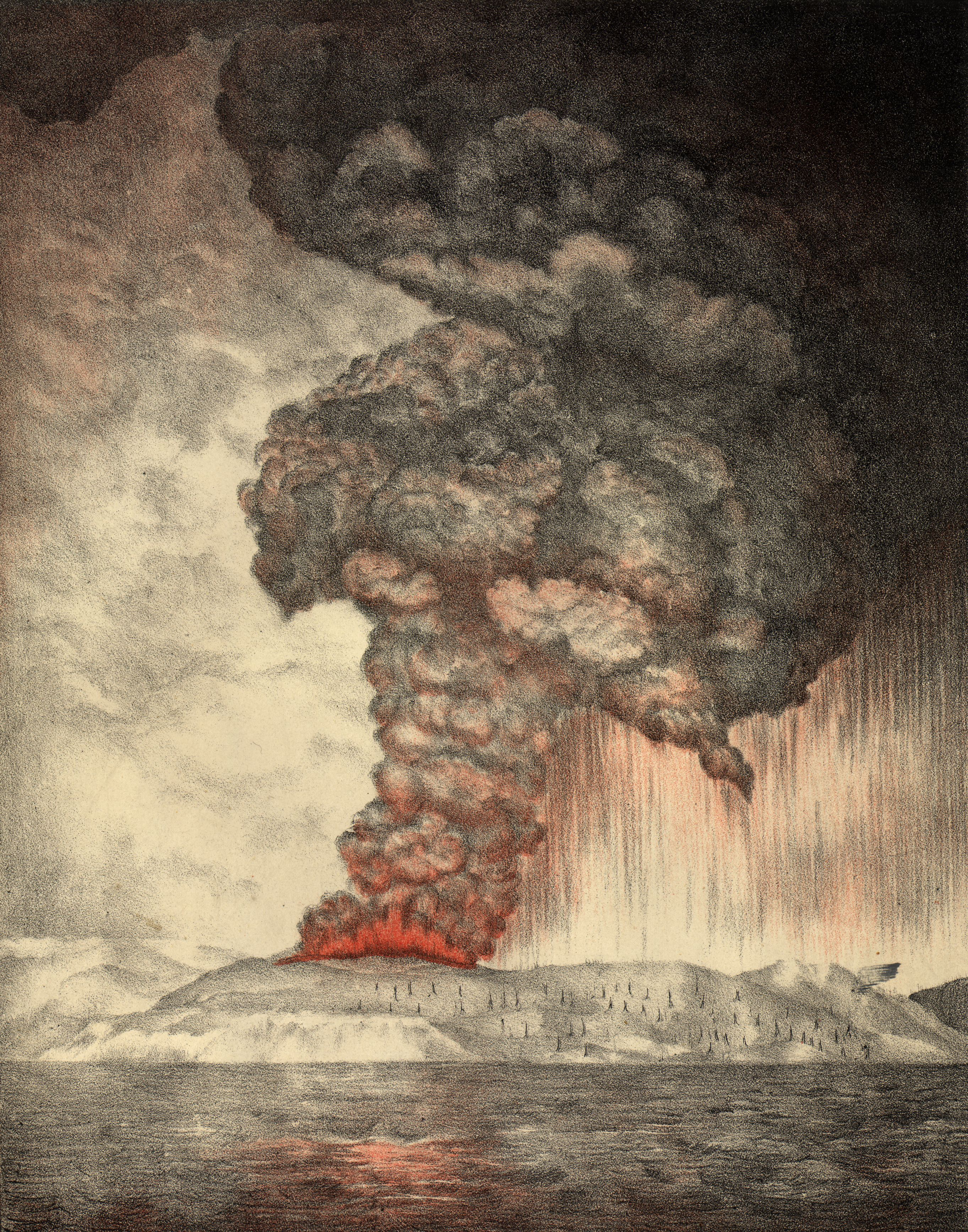
Krakatoa eruption lithograph

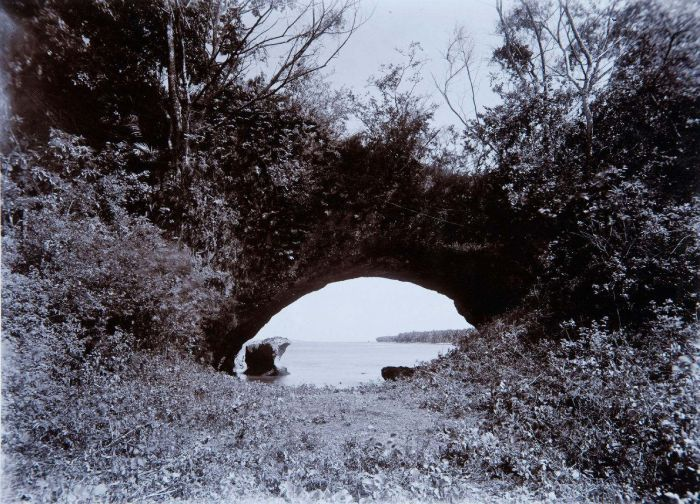
Karang Bolong before discovered by Anwar Padmawidjaja in 1970

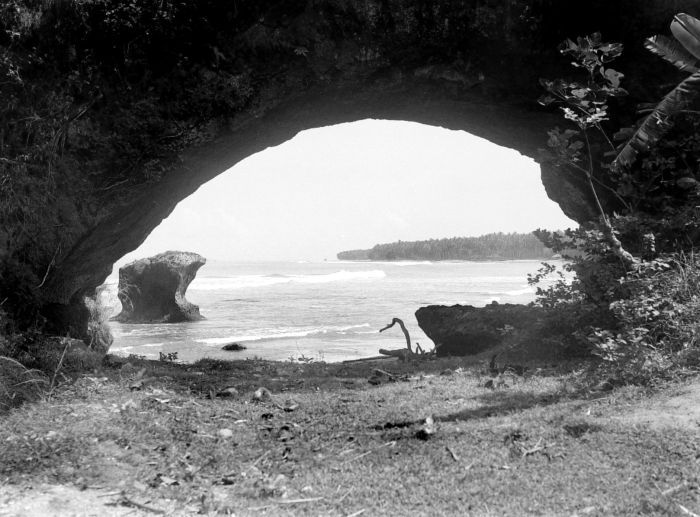
Karang Bolong before discovered by Anwar Padmawidjaja in 1970

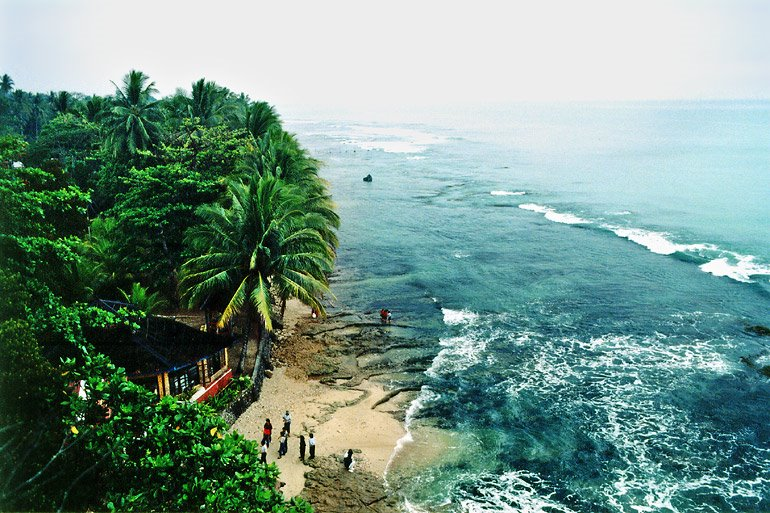
Karang Bolong Beach Today
