= Perang pandan =

Indonesian martial art

Perang Pandan
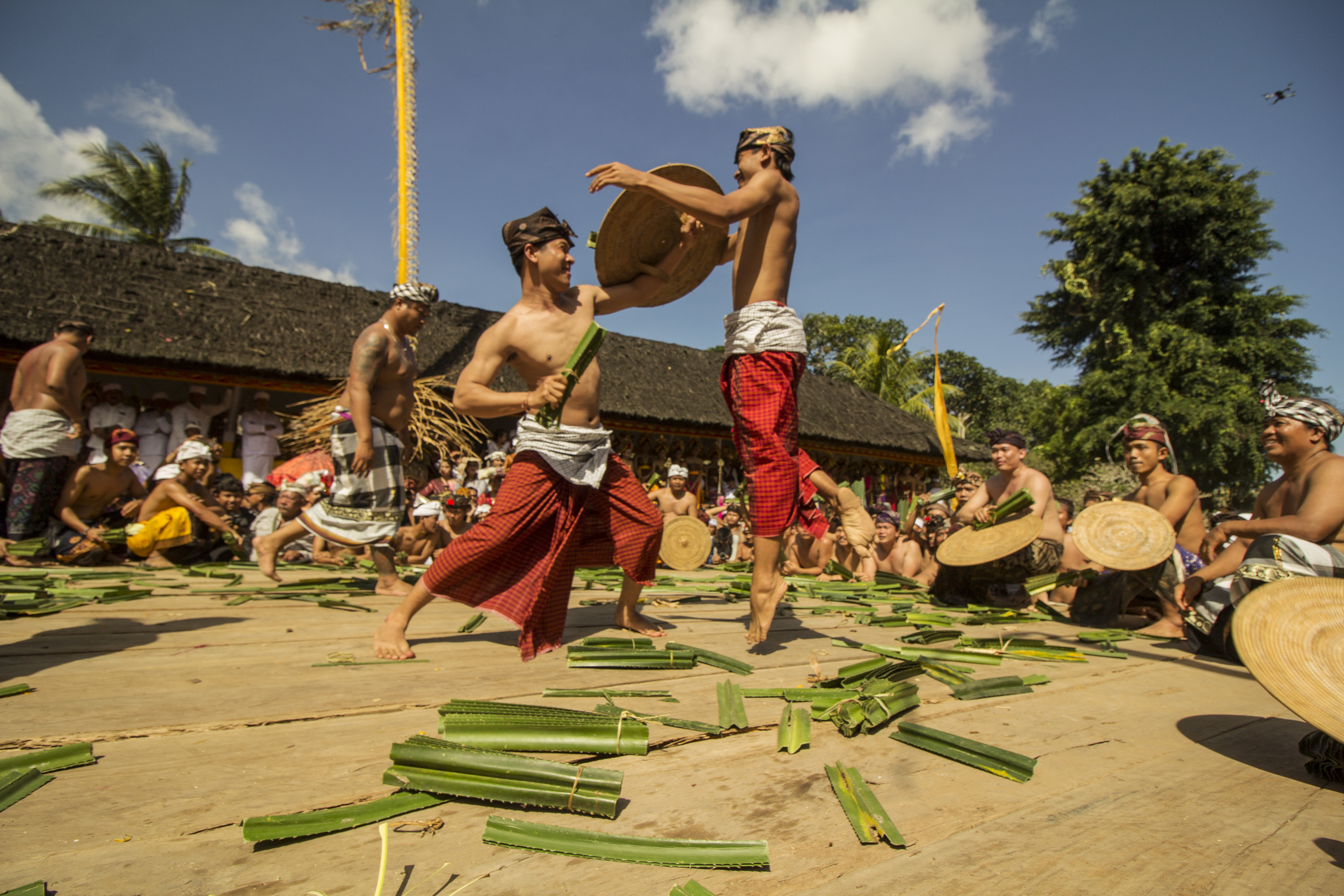
- Mekaré-karé or pandan battle in Tenganan village, Karangasem, Bali
- Also known as: Mekaré-karé or Magerét Pandan (Balinese spelling)
- Focus: Self-defense
- Hardness: Full-contact, semi-contact, light-contact
- Country of origin: Indonesia (Bali)
- Olympic sport: No

Perang pandan (lit. 'pandan battle') is a Balinese tradition of ritual combat with clubs made of pandan (Pandanus amaryllifolius). It is known in the Balinese language as mageret pandan or makare-kare. Perang pandan is practiced by the Bali Aga population of Tenganan village in Karangasem Regency, Indonesia. The people of Tenganan are devotees of the deity Indra. To honour Indra as a warrior god, many major religious festivals in Tenganan involve a ritualistic battle.

== Legend ==
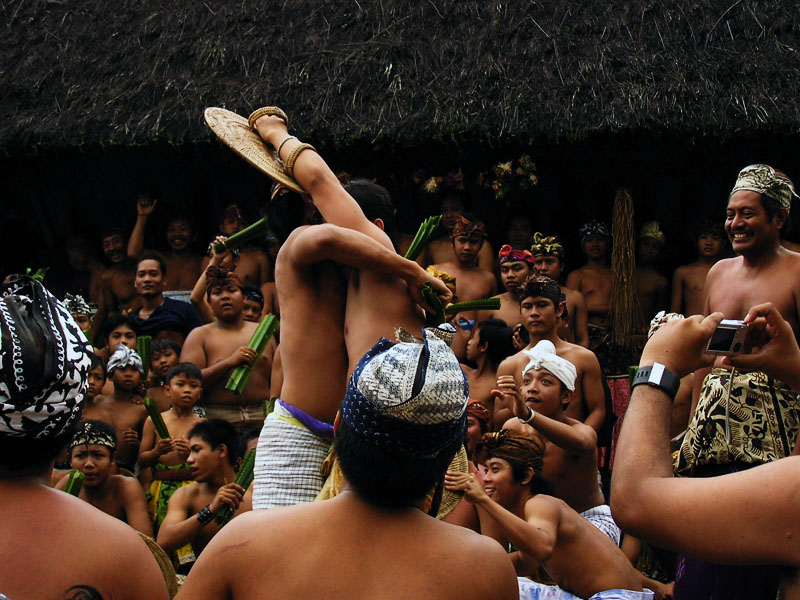
Perang Pandan

The tradition of mageret pandan is said to have originated from Hindu mythology about King Maya Denawa and Indra. King Maya Denawa claimed himself a god greater than the entire Hindu pantheon. He forbade the people from performing their religious ceremonies, which angered the gods. Indra himself fought and defeated Maya Denawa for his blasphemy, and their battle was commemorated through mageret pandan ritual.

== Rituals ==
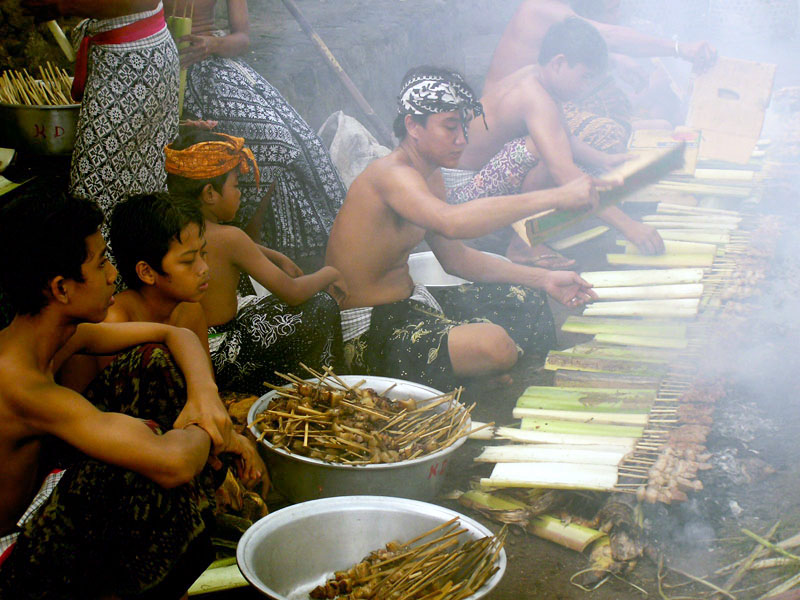
Preparing the feast before perang pandan

Among Tenganan people, mageret pandan is part of a month-full ceremony called 'Usabha Sambah', a ritual to honour the gods, especially Indra, and also to honor the ancestors, held every sasih Kalima — the fifth month on the Balinese calendar around June. The weapon used is a 15cm club made by tying 10-15 leaves of pandan together. Each of the leaves is edged with small sharp thorns. The shield is a rattan buckler. Techniques are mostly swinging strikes, but the competitors resort to scratching each other when in-fighting. Participants compete shirtless, wearing only a sarong (kamen) and traditional headdress (udeng). According to tradition, perang pandan is compulsory for Tenganan males. For the young, it serves as a rite of passage into manhood; children as young as seven have participated.

The blood shed during this ritual was meant as an offering to appease the gods. The wounds suffered by participants were healed using traditional ointment, made from a mixture of arrack, turmeric, galangal and other spices.

== See also ==
- Balinese Hinduism
- Indonesian martial arts
