= Bali Aga architecture =

Architecture of the Bali Aga people of Bali, Indonesia

Bali Aga architecture refers to the architecture of the Bali Aga people, the mountain people of Bali, Indonesia. Compared to the lowland Balinese people, the relative isolation of the Bali Aga people means that they have been less influenced by Hindu-Buddhist traditions. This separate history can be seen in the vernacular architecture of the Bali Aga, which shows more similarity with the Austronesian tradition shared with many Indonesian people across the archipelago.

== Village layout ==
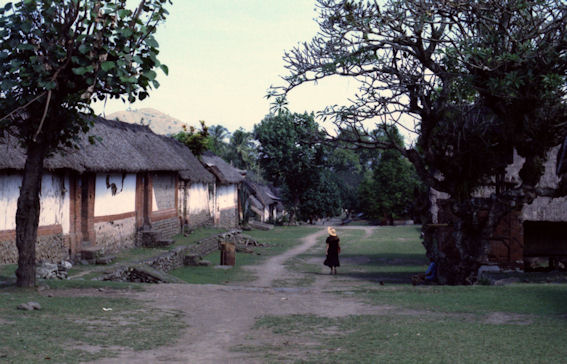
Bali Aga village layout with house compounds facing a broad avenue. Each house compound contains individual houses, each belonging to a nuclear family.

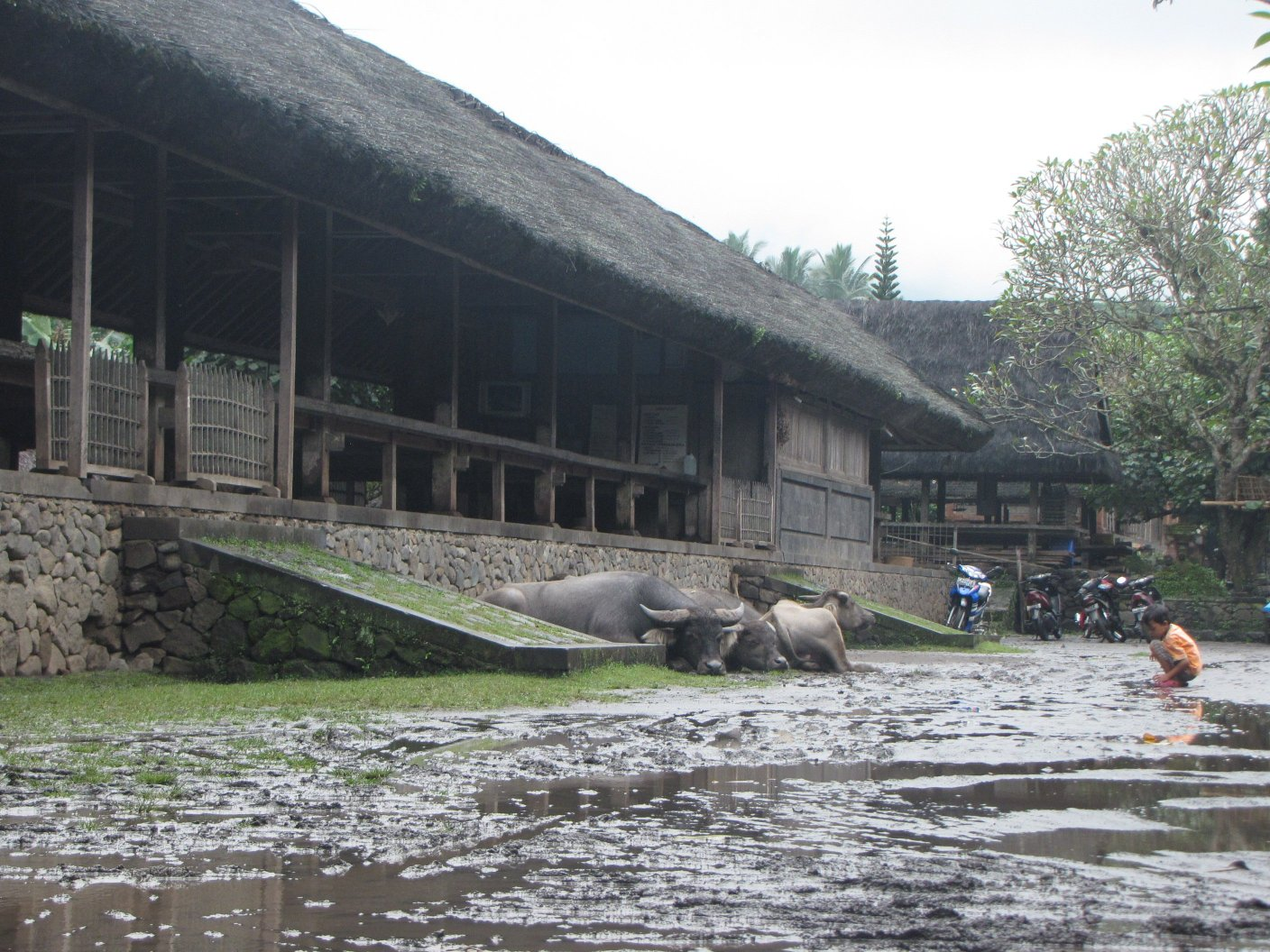
The bale lantang in Tenganan village, a distinctive feature of a Bali Aga village not found in anywhere else in Bali, is an elongated pavilion where the village council discusses community affairs.

The layout of Bali Aga villages are similarly aligned with the lowland Balinese villages. Villages are laid out in relation with the mountain-sea axis of kaja ("to the mountain") and kelod ("to the sea") axis, and the sun path of kangin (where the sun rises, East) and kauh (where the sun sets, West). House compounds are laid out in a kaja-kelod axis, facing a broad avenue. Each house compound (called a banjaran or pekarangan) are enclosed by an earthen wall or hedge. These house compounds contains houses belonging to an extended family.

The heart of a Bali Aga village is the community longhouses called bale lantang (also bale agung ("great pavilion") or bale banjar ("village pavilion")), a sacred council house. These structures are raised on a brick plinth and oriented longitudinally on an uphill-downhil axis. Village council meeting are held in a bale lantang, which take place every new and full moon. Household heads come together and take their place in the bale lantang according to a strict order of precedence, which requires them to be seated in two parallel rows in order of their seniority. The most senior member is always on the uphill (kaja) end on the kangin (sunrise) side.

Bali Aga villages may be found throughout the mountains around Kintamani in central Bali. Among the most notable Bali Aga village is Tenganan in Karangasem Regency.

== House compound ==
The layout and function of the house compound of Bali Aga people is very different with the low Balinese house compound. The first differences is that each building in a house compound are not functionally differentiated. In lowland Balinese, each house (a pavilion or bale) has a specific function, e.g. bale meten is a pavilion for sleeping and paon is a pavilion for cooking. In Bali Aga house compound, each house is a self-contained entity where the sleeping area, kitchen, and all the functions of a house is situated. Unlike the lowland Balinese, where only certain people can use a certain pavilion (e.g. House Meten is only for the head of the household), each Bali Aga house is home to a married couple, their children, and sometimes a dependent elderly parent. A family unit in Bali Aga is known as kuren; kuren is a Bali Aga term for both a hearth and for a group of people who share the food cooked upon it.

The second differences is the layout of each house compound. The lowland Balinese pavilions surround a central courtyard (natah). In Bali Aga house compound, each houses (umah) are arranged in a line along an uphill-downhill axis, like row houses facing a central corridor. A single row of houses indicates a compound established by one male ancestor. Sometimes there are two parallel rows of houses, which are evidence of more than one founder, usually a group of brothers or brothers-in-law. The entrances of each of the houses all face inwards toward the central corridor.

As the male children of a Bali Aga couple marry and form their own households, new houses are added at the downhill end of the row. When older generations die, the houses they lived at the uphill end become vacant and are inherited by younger couples, rather like a game of musical chairs. If there are no heirs, the house are returned to the village. This ideal pattern of succession is not always adhered to but it is expected that the most senior member of the extended family should dwell in the house at the uphill end.

Each compound contains an origin temple (kemulan) at the uphill end, dedicated to the ancestors of the extended family who reside there.

== Houses ==
Bali Aga house is a rectangular post-and-beam structure supporting a steeply pitcher roof made of bamboo shingles or of a thick grass thatch. It is raised on a low plinth of compacted earth faced with stone. The walls are typically thick wooden planks or plaited bamboo strips. The windows are small or non-existent. A single door is situated at the center of the house, facing the central corridor of the compound.

The layout of room in the houses (umah) of Bali Aga is laid out in a concept of inside-outside (or left-right) and uphill (kaja)-downhill (kelod) (or male-female). The concept of inside-outside relates to the social interactions between family members and outsiders. The concept of upward-downward related with the male activities (welcoming guests) and female activities (cooking). Each house is divided into six compartments, and so the compartment on the mountain-side is the upward area reserved for the head of the household and house shrines, while the downhill area reserved for female activities related with nurturing and sustenance for the family. The central area is reserved for guests.

Guests are welcomed inside the house to sit on the trojogan (from ojog, 'to head for' or 'to view'). The trojogan is basically a raised wooden platform situated directly opposite the entrance. A shelf to place the lontar manuscripts is situated in the wall of the trojogan. The head of the household would sit in the lubangan gede ("large cavity"), another raised platform situated to the uphill-side of the central entrance door. His wife would go to the hearth (situated to the downhill-side of the central entrance door) to prepare drink for the guest or to fetch from the downhill larder (lubangan beten). The placement of the guest in the central compartment on the inner side of the house reflect some of the positive values attached to outsiders and exotic goods or influences among the Bali Aga.

== Decline ==
Traditional Bali Aga architecture is disappearing in many places as houses are being rebuilt using modern materials.

== See also ==
- Balinese architecture
- Balinese traditional house

== Cited works ==
- Davison, Julian (2003). Balinese architecture. Singapore: Tuttle Publishing. ISBN 9780794600716.
- Reuter, Thomas (1998). Gunawan Tjahjono (ed.). Architecture:House and Compounds in the Mountains of Bali. Indonesian Heritage. Vol. 6. Singapore: Archipelago Press. ISBN 981-3018-30-5.
