= Trunyan =

Balinese village in Indonesia

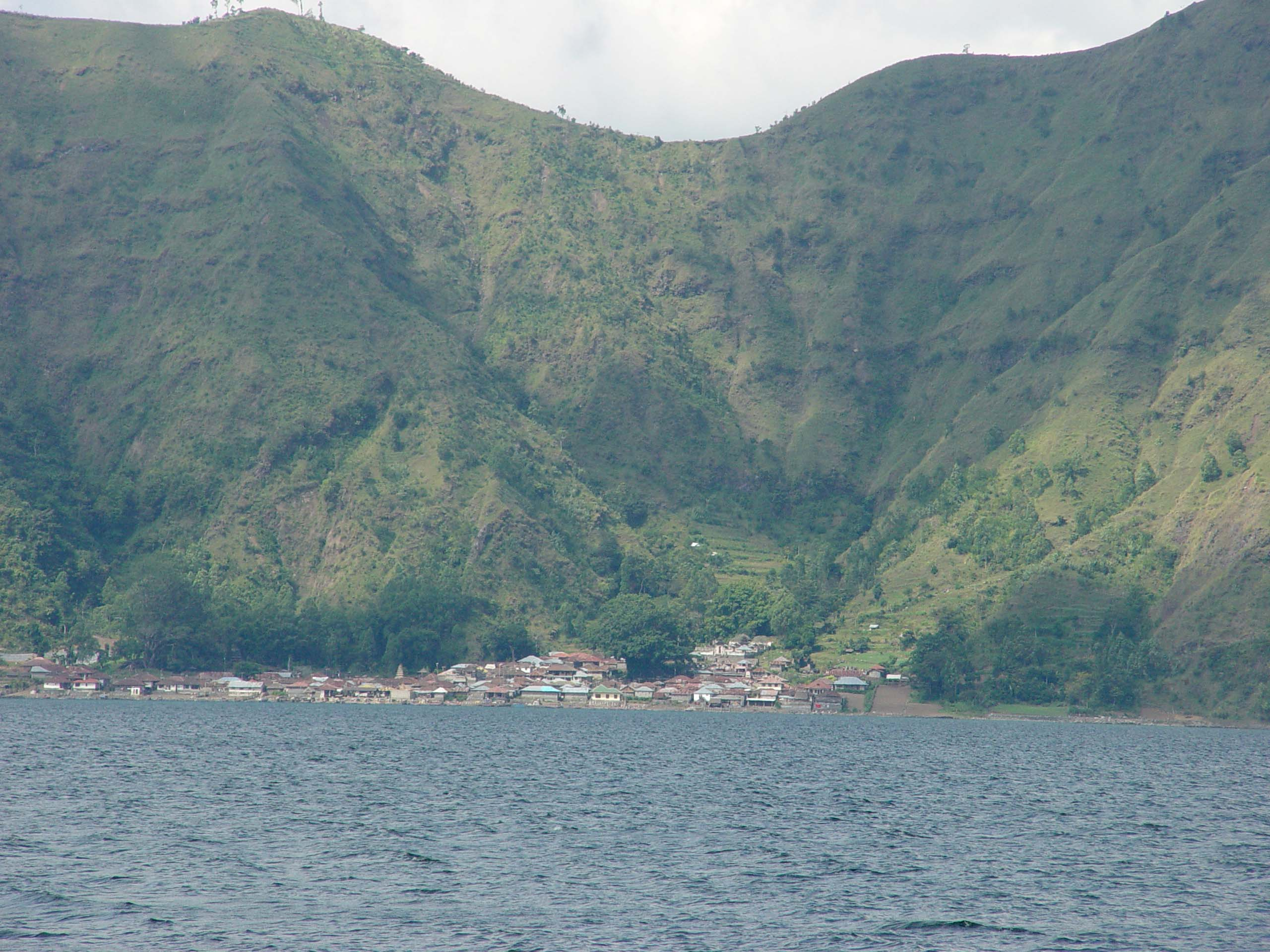
The isolated Bali Aga village of Trunyan on the eastern shore of Lake Batur at the foot of Mount Abang.

Trunyan (Balinese: ᬢ᭄ᬭᬸᬜᬦ᭄) or Terunyan is a Balinese village (banjar) located on the eastern shore of Lake Batur, a caldera lake in Bangli Regency, central Bali, Indonesia. The village is one of the most notable homes of the Bali Aga people, the others being the villages of Tenganan and Sambiran.

== Description ==
Some lithic tools found at Trunyan indicate a culture of hunters-gatherers.

== Society ==
Trunyan society consists of two main "castes", the banjar jero and the banjar jaba. The castes are based on bloodlines dating back to the Gelgel dynasty.

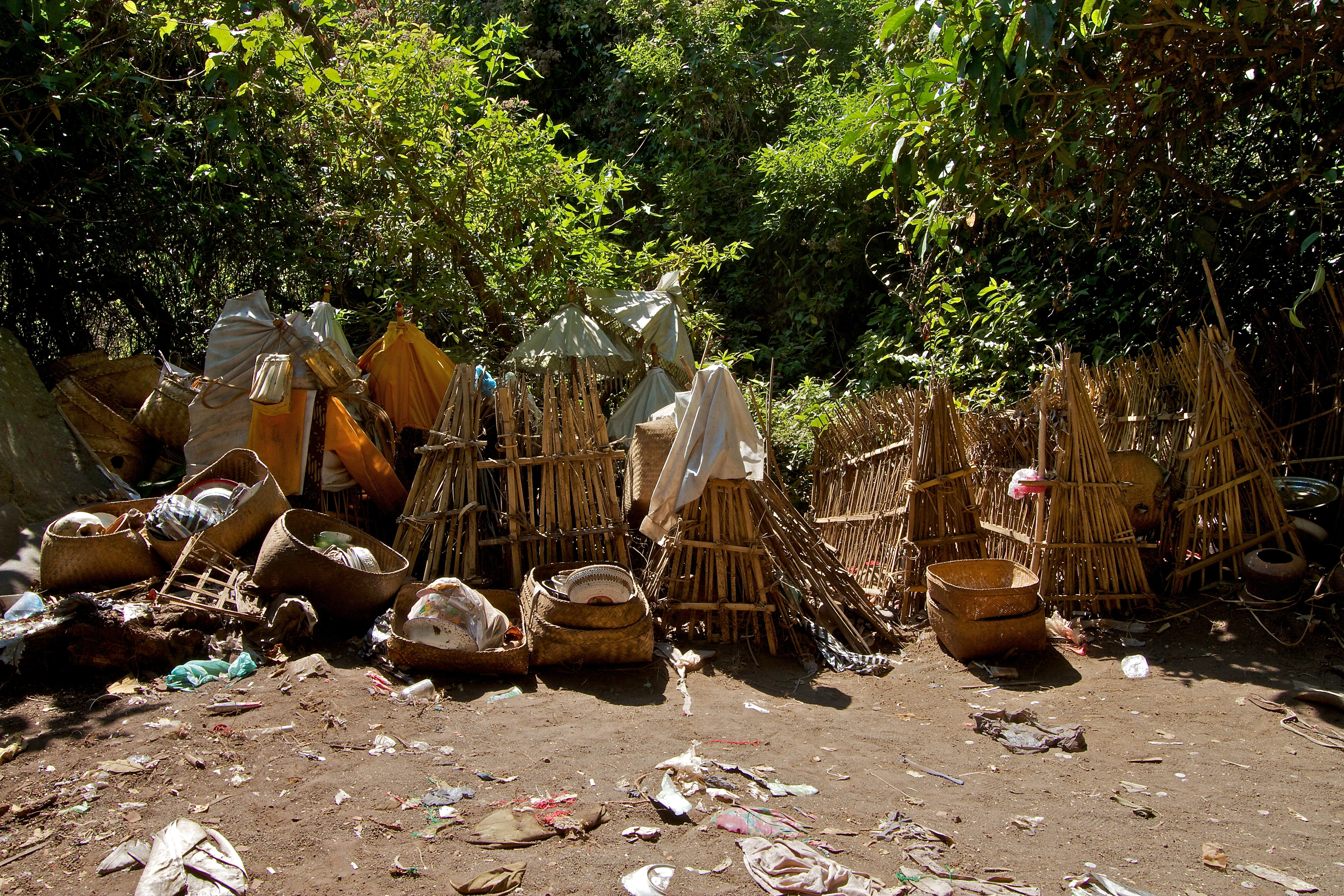
Bamboo cages covering the deceased in Trunyan, Bali.

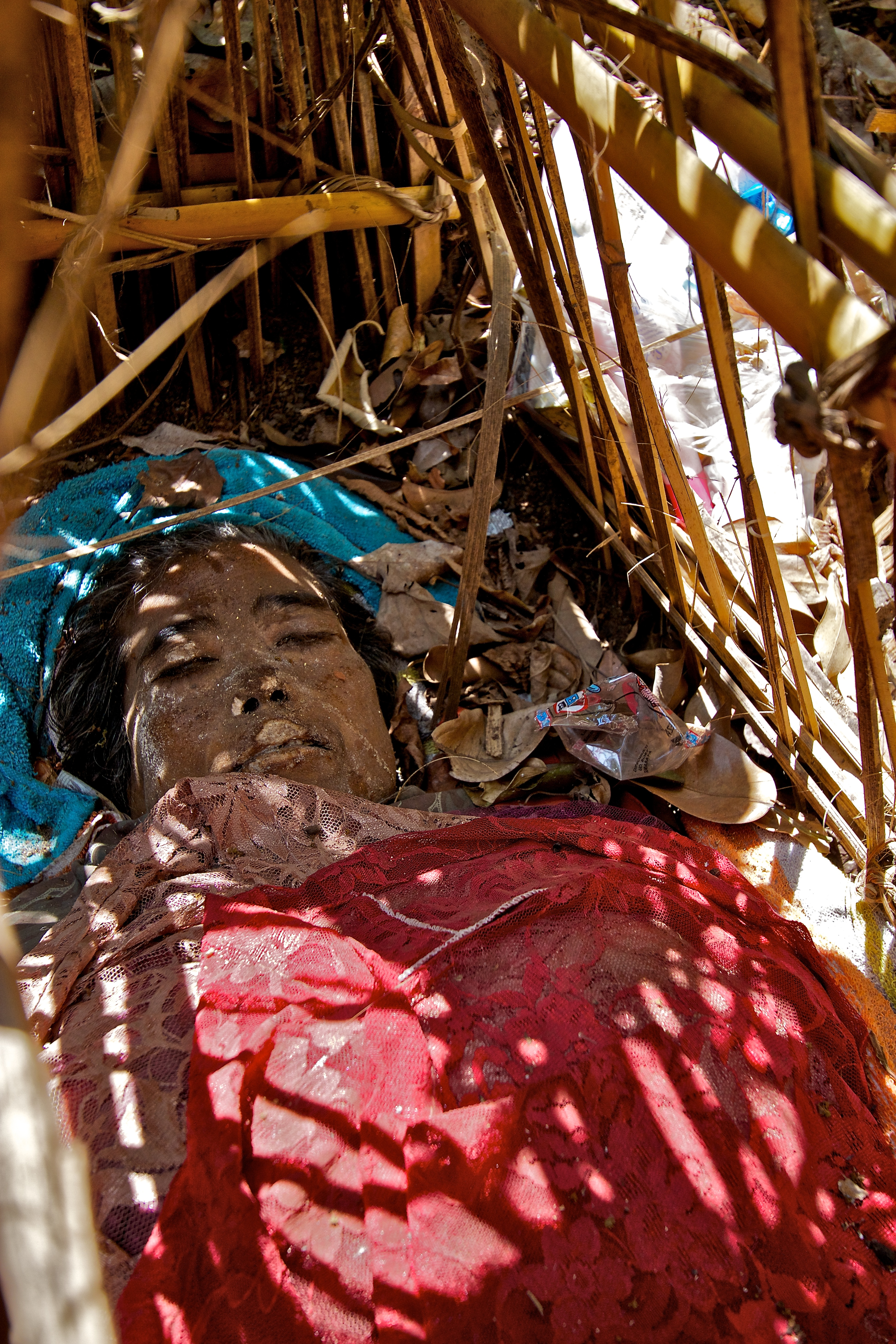
The body of a young lady inside a bamboo cage is left to decompose.

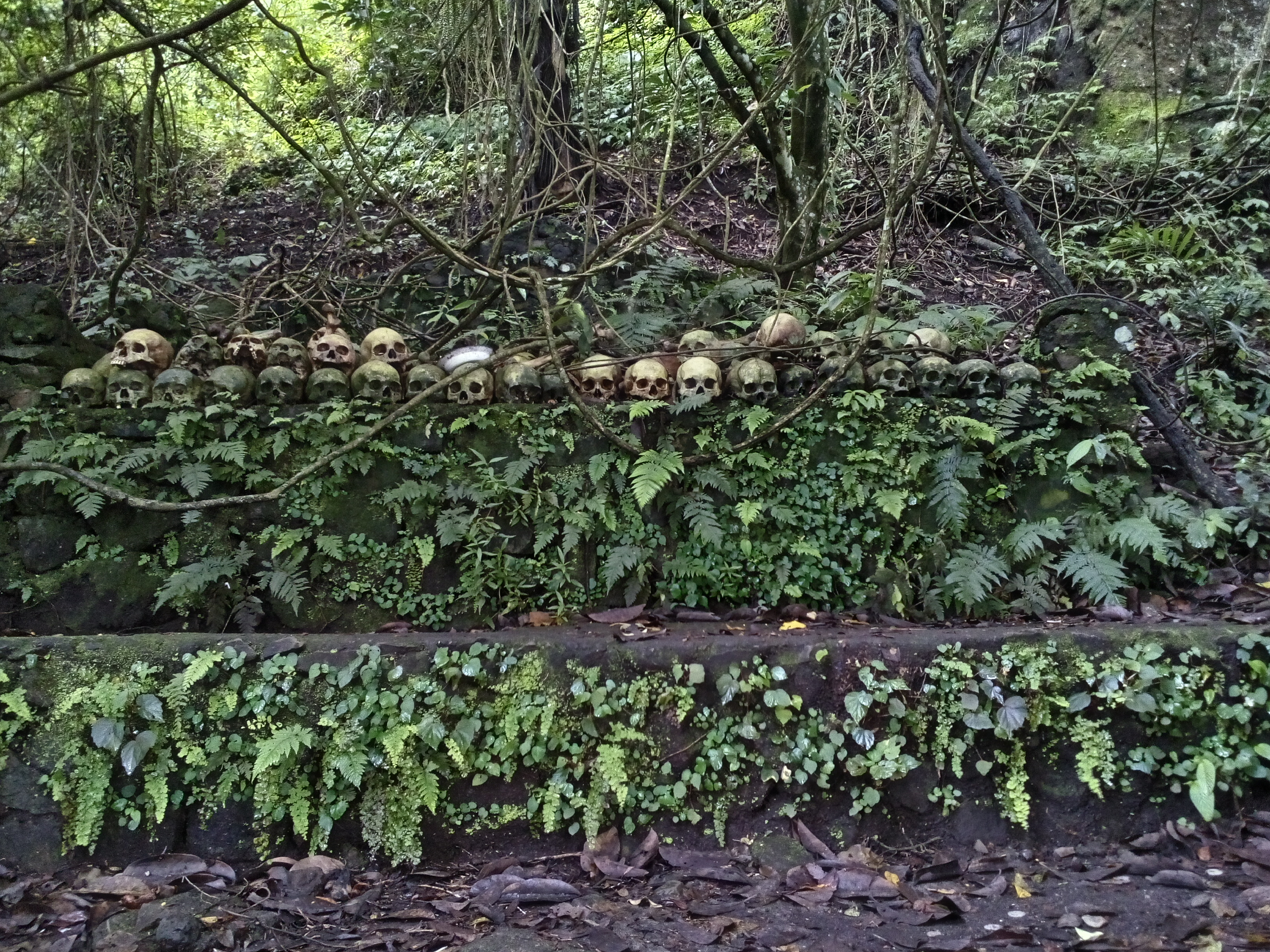
Skulls on altar

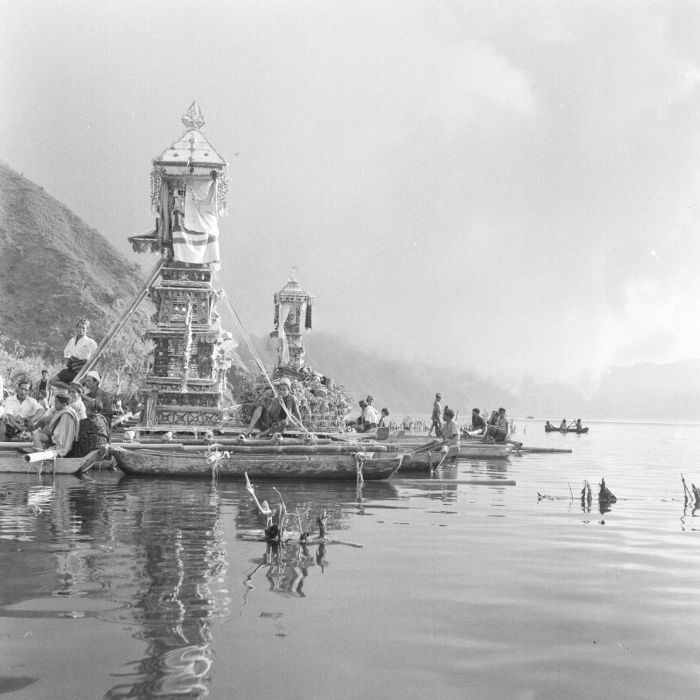
Corpse towers on lake Batur, Trunyan

== Volcano god Bhatara Da Tonta ==
The Trunyanese worship a local god and patron of the village known as Ratu Gede Pancering Jagat, known by the Trunyanese as Bhatara Da Tonta. The local god is connected with the Batur volcano. Bhatara Da Tonta is rendered as a four-meter-tall Neolithic effigy.

== Barong Brutuk ==
Barong Brutuk dance

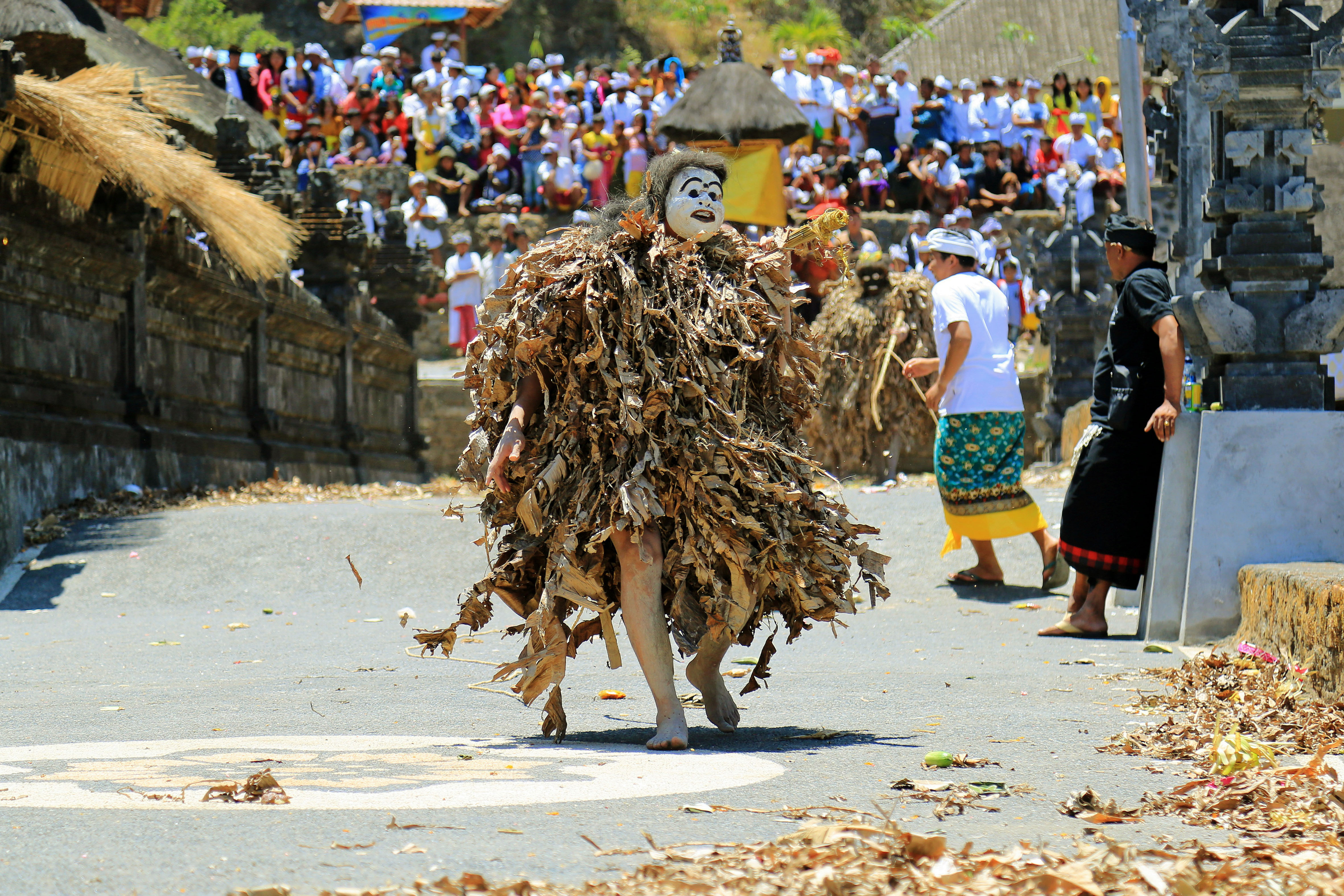

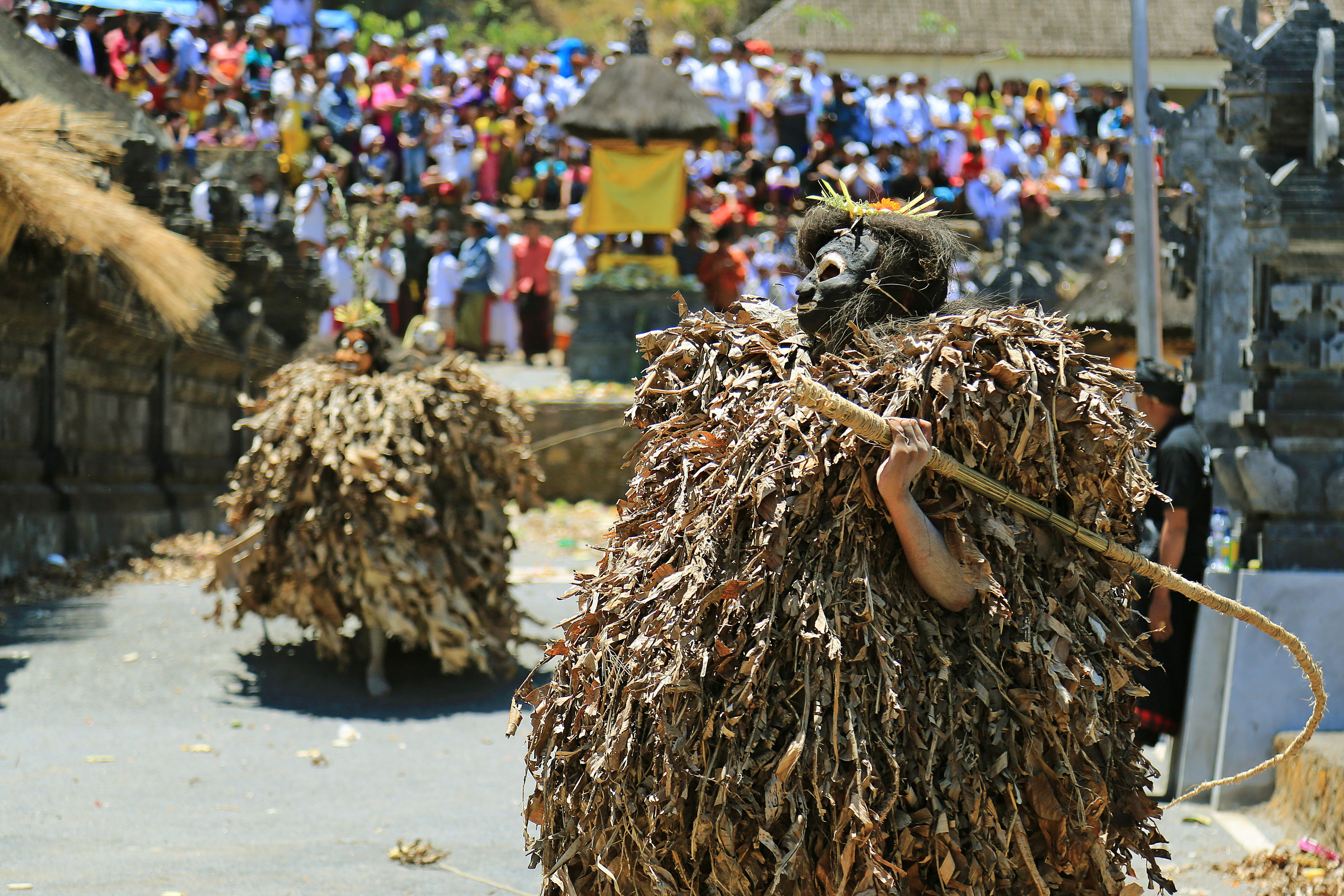

== Bibliography ==
- Auger, Timothy, ed. (2001). Bali & Lombok. Eyewitness Travel Guides. London: Dorling Kindersley. ISBN 0751368709.
- Cooke, John (2005). "Mystery of the Candis - An Introduction to Early Balinese History". The Bali Children's Project. Archived from the original on November 21, 2016.
- Emiko Susilo (1997). "Gambuh: A Dance-Drama of the Balinese Courts" (PDF). Explorations in Southeast Asian Studies. 1 (2). Archived (PDF) from the original on November 21, 2016.
