= Geringsing =

Double ikat woven fabric of Bali

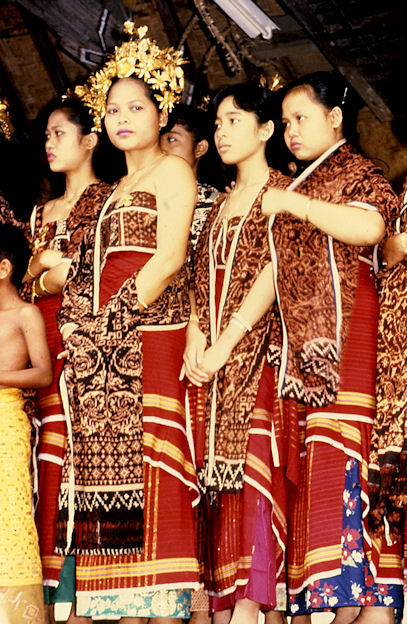
- Young Women dressed in geringsing
- Type: Art Fabric
- Material: silk and cotton
- Place of origin: Indonesia (Bali)

Geringsing (from Balinese: ᬕ᭄ᬭᬶᬂᬲᬶᬂ, romanized: gringsing) is a Tenun textile created by the double ikat method in the Bali Aga village of Tenganan Pegeringsingan in Bali. The demanding technique is only practiced in parts of India, Japan and Indonesia. In Indonesia it is confined to the village of Tenganan.

According to textile expert John Guy, "the ancestry of Balinese geringsing is far from clear, although some cloths display the unmistakable influence of patola", the silk double ikats produced in Gujarat during the height of the Spice Trade (16-17C). Many of these imported cloths became the inspiration for later locally made textiles, but one theory is that the Balinese-made cloths were exported to India and copied there for production to Asian markets. Many have unique Hindu motifs such as a bird's eye view of a mandala with a sacred center from which everything radiates. Others feature designs clearly inspired by patola, for example a design known as the frangipani flower (Jepun). The palette of geringsing is typically red, neutral, and black. Geringsing are regarded as sacred cloths, "ascribed supernatural properties, especially to assist in forms of healing, including exorcism." Gering means disease and sing means no.

== History ==
The people of Tenganan Pegeringsin are said to come from the pre-Majapahit Bali kingdom of Pejeng, pre-dating the occupation of Bali by the Hindu Javanese who arrived at the end of the Majapahit era (15th century). There is a legend that they were bequeathed their land by the king who said that they could have as much land as a man and horse could ride around in a day. The horseman chosen had a magical horse and he encircled a vast tract of land which the king was obliged to grant him.

Geringsing is mentioned in the poem Rangga Lawe which tells of the first Majapahit king, Raden Wijaya giving his warriors gerinsing sashes to protect them in Battle. A later mention is in the poem Nagarakrtagama by the Buddhist sage Prapancana, composed in 1365 who describes curtains of the king Hayam Wuruk's carriage as being made of Geringsing. The first European to describe geringseng was W.O.J Nieuwenkamp in 1906. He found 2 cloths in a box of textiles that he bought in Tabanan for the Ethnographic Museum in Leiden. After this he discovered where they came from and made a journey to Tenganan.

== Weaving technique ==
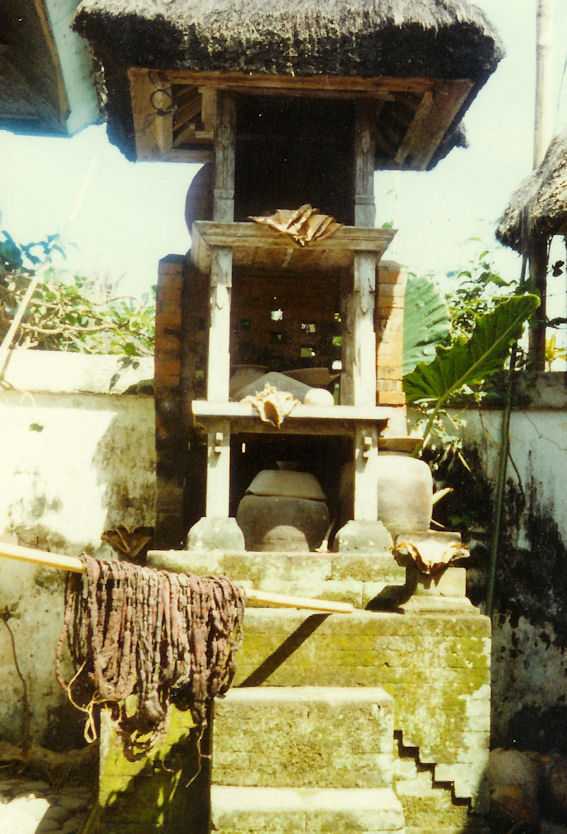
Bundles of cotton tied and drying in the family temple waiting to be dyed

The cloths are woven on a narrow back-strap looms. The cotton is hand-spun. Before dying the threads are soaked in a bath of kemiri, candle nut oil, and wood ash to aid the take-up of the red dye, then hung up to dry in the sun. Ramseyer said that the yarn was left to soak for 42 days and then left to dry for the same time. Gillow states that this is repeated up to 12 times. The threads are wrapped around the dying frame and the pattern is tied into the bundles of thread to form a resist. The bound warp and weft threads are then sent out to the neighboring village of Bug-Bug to be dyed as indigo is forbidden to be used in Tenganan. Once dyed indigo, the threads are put back on the frames and some of the ties are undone to allow the red component of the pattern to be developed. The indigo is also over-dyed by the red to give the characteristic dark rust-brown color. The warp is then laid out on the loom and the cloth is woven in a loose balanced weave. The pattern is carried by both the warp and the weft. Great precision is needed at all stages of the production. Using a pick the weaver adjust the weft with each pass of the shuttle to make sure the alignment of the pattern is precise.

== Form and design ==
There are about 20 designs of geringsing known, not all are still being made. Recently some enterprising Japanese actually copyrighted some geringsing designs. The fear is the potential to sue the people of Tenganan for copyright breach when they produce one of those designs.

The color of geringsing is consistent across the range of the designs consisting of red, reddish brown, an eggshell color and a dark blue/black/brown. There are two head patterns or Tumpal, similar to some batik designs leaving a central panel. The pattern can be made of vertically orientated geometric and abstract floral motif repeating across the central field (gerinsing paparé, geingsing enjékan, geringsing battun tuung). In other cloths the pattern is not only vertical and horizontal, but the repetition is pursued across the diagonal (geringsing cicempaka, geringsing cemplong).

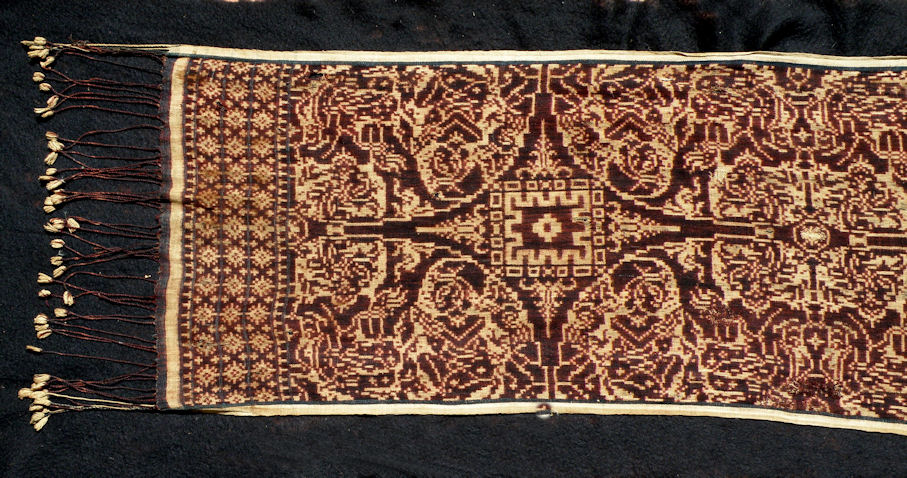
Portion of a Geringsing Wayang Putri textile 200 x 40 cm

Central field patterns are formed in a different way in that the design has large four pointed stars dividing the cloth into semicircular segments. these segments contain stars, emblems, architectural, elements animals, and wayang kulit style figures. (gerigsing wayang kebo, geringsing wayan putri, gerigsing patelikur isi, gerigsing lubèng)

The width of the cloths vary, investigations so far have shown seven different widths of which five are still in use. The narrowest cloth are composed of 14 patterned strips, the fringes of which are uncut and worn by boys and men as tubular sashes (sabuk tubuhan) and knotted at the front of the chest or loin height so that the knotted fringe hangs downwards. The other way they are worn is around the neck so that the knot falls forward in the method of wearing called menatangkon. These narrow cloths are also worn as kemben by women.

== Rules and restraints ==
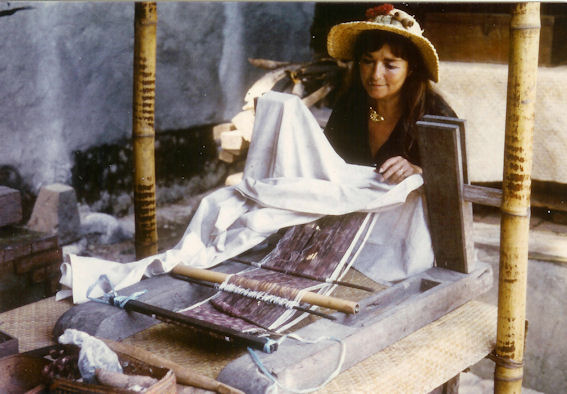
Back-strap loom with an incomplete weaving showing its protective white cloth

There are rules that constrain both dying and the weaving of geringsing in order to protect its magical properties. During the period of the soaking of the un-dyed thread bundles in the candlenut and wood ash water, they are kept in an earthenware jar for 42 days covered with a black and white cloth (gotia) to protect from spirits. As a general rule women do not weave if they are menstruating. When the cloths are not being worked on the loom is covered by a white cloth. There are many other strict rituals related to the dying and weaving of gerinsing mentioned in the Western literature, but none of the older inhabitants seem to remember them.

== Ritual use of geringsing ==
By virtue of their magical qualities geringsing are not only capable of keeping impurities and danger out of the village, but also shield and protect humans from baleful influences during rites of passage as they transition from one phase of life to the next. The Tengananese receive their first geringsing at the hair cutting ritual. His hair is cut and placed in a basket which is placed on a folded geringsing on the balé tengah, on which the Tegananese both enters and leaves the world. In the ceremony that admits a boy or girl to the youth association of the village, they are carried in a geringsing cloth on their father's right shoulder. In the concluding ceremony of teruna nyoma which is the initiation, the candidates wear a geringsing and bear a keris for the tooth filing ceremony, an essential rite of passage for all Balinese Hindu. The participants pillow is covered by geringsing. After death the genitals of the deceased are covered by a geringsing hip sash. These cloths may not be used again and so usually are sold. In the purification of the soul ceremony (muhun) the dead person's presence, which is symbolizes by an inscribed palm leaf, is also arrayed in a geringsing. In the wedding ceremony the groom invites his in-laws to visit the couple, dressed in festal geringsing clothing, at his parents home where relatives bring symbolic gifts which are placed on a geringsing cloth.

== Gallery ==
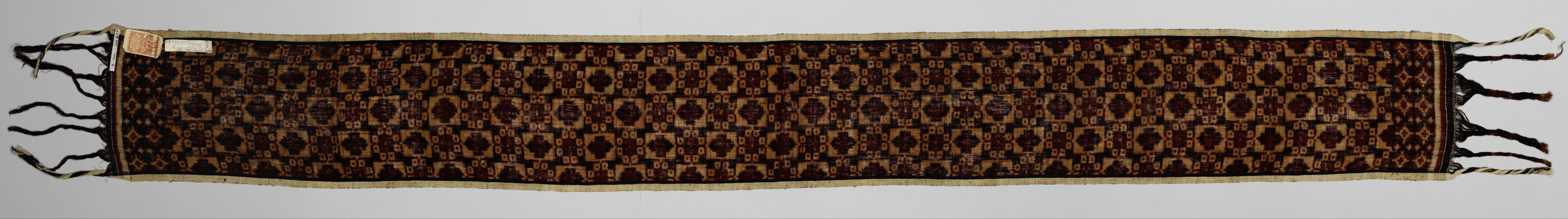

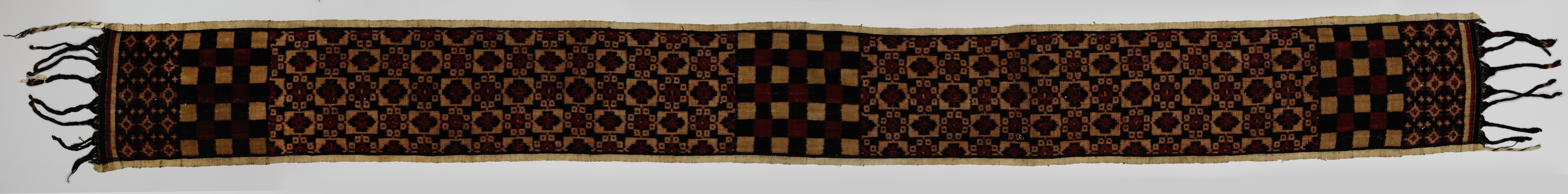

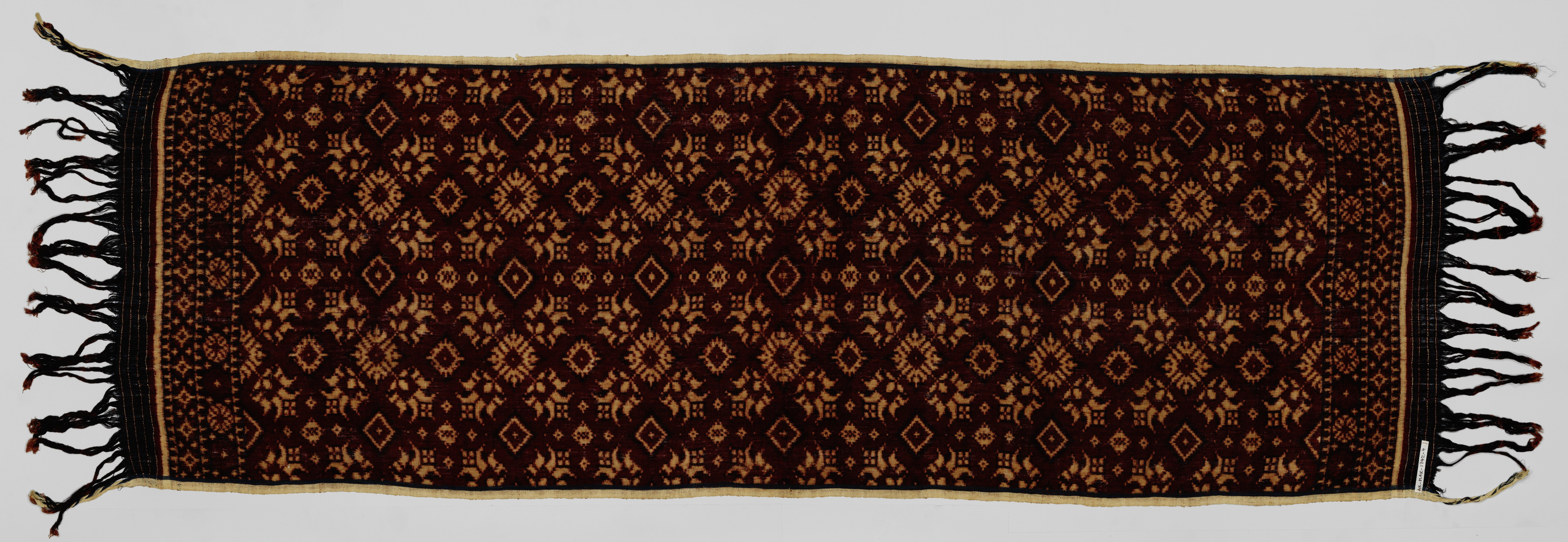

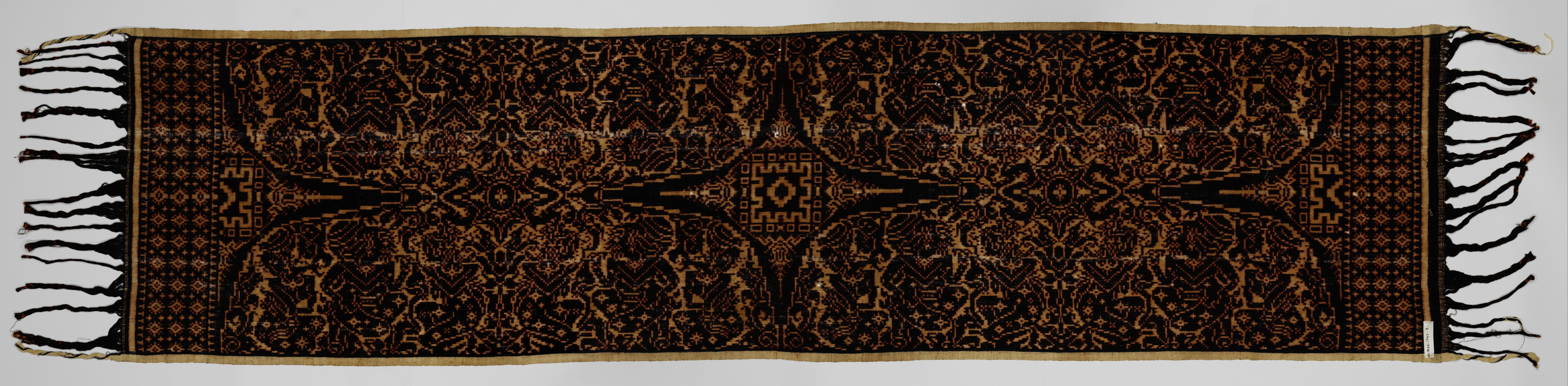

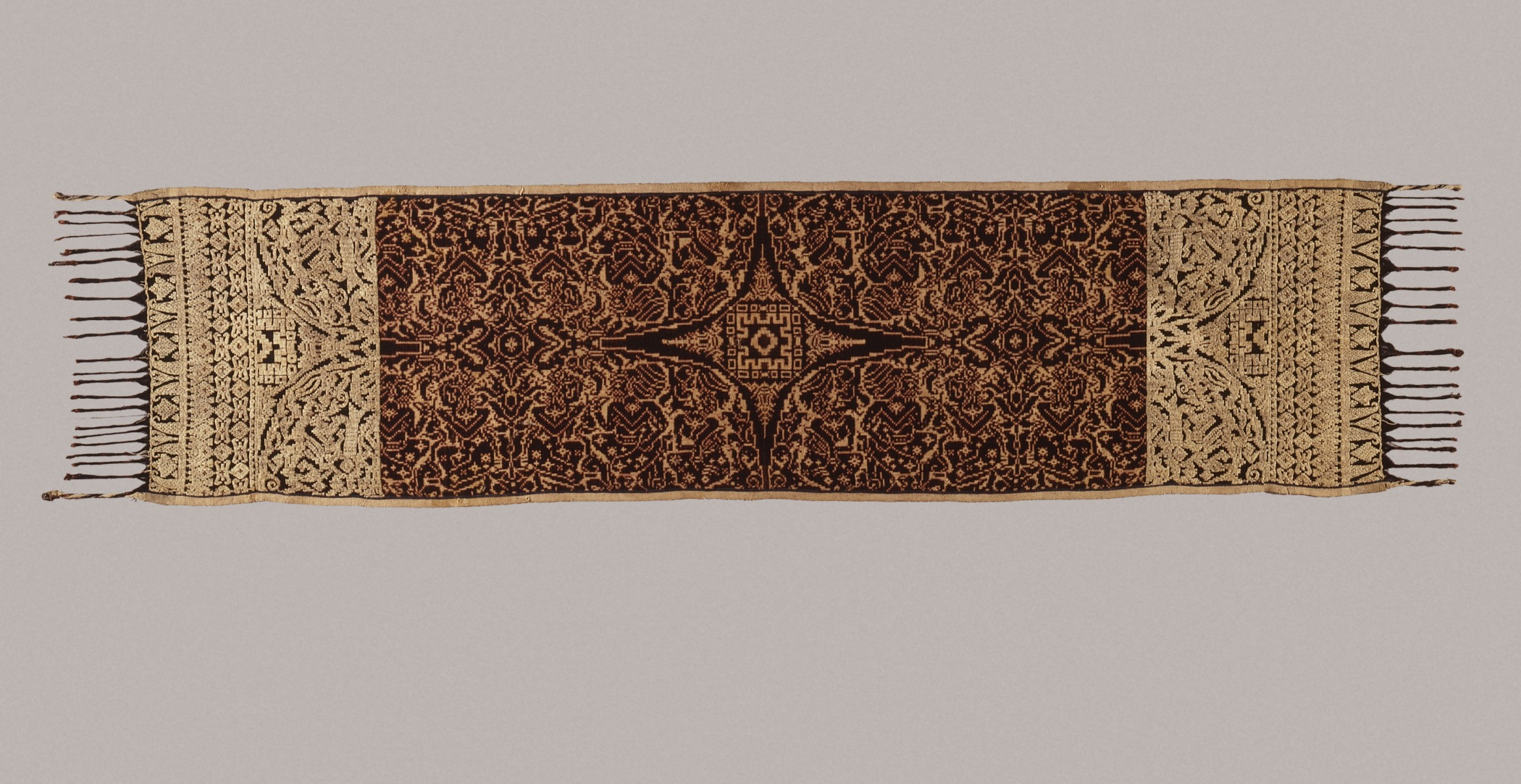

== See also ==
- Balinese textiles
- Textiles of Sumba
- Ulos
- Batik
