= Balinese copperplate inscription =

The Balinese copperplate inscription or Sembiran inscription is a collection of ten copper plate inscriptions, which were found in the village of Sembiran, Tejakula district, Buleleng Regency, on the northern part of Bali island. All inscription plates have a date, which is between 922 and 1181 CE, so they include more than 200 years. Sembiran AI is dated 844 saka (922 CE), Sembiran B is dated 873 saka (951 CE), Sembiran A II is dated 897 saka (975 CE), Sembiran A III is dated 938 saka (1016 CE), Sembiran A IV is dated 987 saka (1065 CE), and Sembiran C is dated 1103 saka (1181 CE). Some of the oldest inscriptions are written in Old Balinese, while some of the later ones are written in Old Javanese.

These inscriptions are the earliest information regarding the condition of the Julah area and its surroundings. The written text states that the inscriptions were addressed to the "keraman of Julah" (Julah village elders). This implies that the original inhabitants of Sembiran village were from the village of Julah, some of whom then moved 1 km up the mountain from the coast to avoid attacks from the sea.

== See also ==
- Warmadewa dynasty
