= Bali Aga =

Indigenous Austronesian people of Bali

Bali Aga/Bali Mula Bali Agans
ᬩᬮᬶᬅᬕ (Bali Aga) ᬩᬮᬶᬫᬸᬮ (Bali Mula)
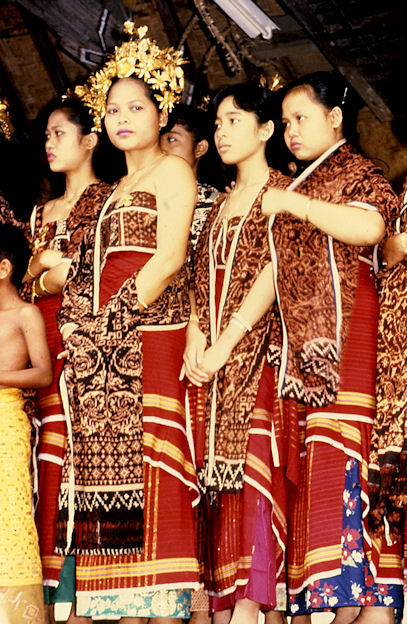
- A young Bali Aga/Bali Mula in a traditional dress (Geringsing)

Total population
- 63,000 (Note: According to Joshua Project sources but many consider that the source is unreliable)

Regions with significant populations
- Indonesia; Bali (mainly in Bangli, Buleleng, and Karangasem regencies)

Languages
- Native: Balinese (Bali Aga Balinese); Also: Indonesian, Kawi and Sanskrit

Religion
- Predominantly Hinduism (Folk Hinduism)

Related ethnic groups
- Austronesian peoples Balinese · Nak Nusé · Sasak · Bayanese · Sumbawa · Sundanese · Javanese

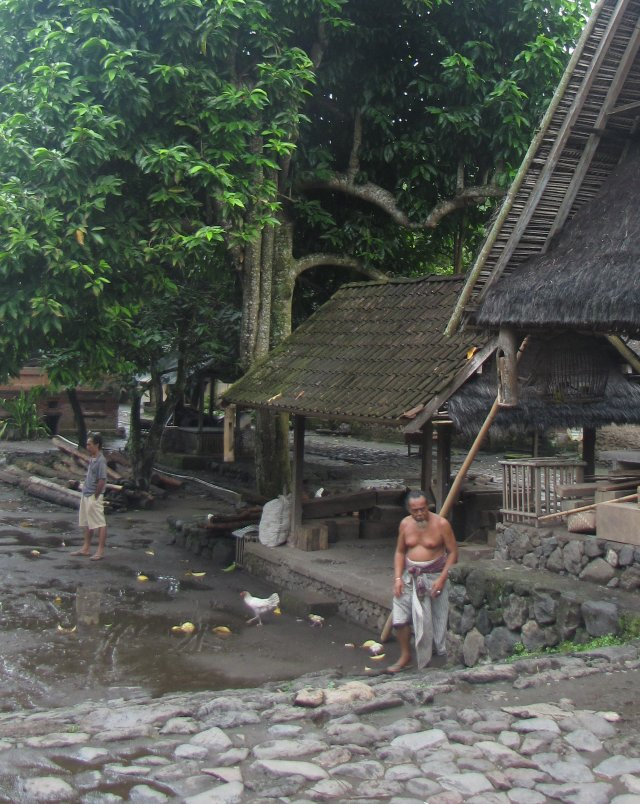
A Bali Aga tribesfolk

The Bali Aga, Baliaga, or Bali Mula, are the indigenous people of Bali. Linguistically they are an Austronesian people. Bali Aga people are predominantly located in the eastern part of the island, in Bangli especially the mountains Kintamani, East Buleleng, East Karangasem, but they can also be found in north-western and central regions. The term Bali Aga or Bali Pegunungan (Mountain Balinese) is regarded as an insult with an additional meaning of "the mountain people that are fools"; therefore, they prefer the term Bali Mula (lit. 'Original Balinese') instead.

Bali Aga people who are referred to as Bali Pegunungan (Mountain Balinese) are those that are located at Trunyan village. For the Trunyan Bali Aga people, the term Bali Aga or Bali Pegunungan (Balinese: Mountain Balinese) is regarded as an insult with an additional meaning of "the mountain people that are fools"; therefore, they prefer the term Bali Mula (lit Original Balinese) instead.

The Bali Aga/Bali Mula still maintain their old beliefs called folk Hinduism which has slight differences with Hinduism of the Balinese people one of them is not performing Ngaben cremation what most Balinese people do is to burn the bodies of people who have died, on the other hand, the Bali Aga/Bali Mula people leave the bodies lying on the ground on a tree which they call Taru Menyan until the corpse becomes only bones, the Bali Aga/Bali Mula people believe that the corpses do not smell bad because they are placed around the Taru Menyan tree, This is one of the traditions of the Bali Aga/Bali Mula community in Trunyan village and has become a unique phenomenon.

== Origin ==
The original inhabitants of Bali are said to have come from Bedulu village long before the Hindu-Javanese immigration wave. Legend states that in Bedulu lived the last king of Pejeng (an old Balinese kingdom), Sri Aji Asura Bumibanten, who had supernatural powers. He could cut off his head without feeling pain and put it back on again. One day, his head accidentally fell into a river and was swept away. In panic, One of his servants quickly decapitated a pig and replaced the king's head with the animal's head. Embarrassed, the king hid in a tall tower, denying any visitors. A small child discovered the secret and since then, the king has become known as Dalem Bedulu, or He-who-changed-head. Another explanation is that the name comes from Badahulu or "the village upstream". After the Pejeng kingdom, the Majapahit Empire rose to power. In the year 1344, Bali Aga people under Ki Kayuselem revolted against Majapahit

== Number, locations ==
An inventory of Bali Aga villages by the Public Works Office en 1988-1989 recorded about 38 traditional villages, in seven regencies. However, a research published in 2015 found 62 Bali Aga villages spread across seven regencies.

Among these seven regencies, Bangli Regency has the highest number of Bali Aga villages: 25 villages - including six in Bangli, Susut and Tembuku sub-districts. The Kintamani sub-district includes about 19 Bali Aga villages, disseminated at the foot of mount Batur, along lake Batur and in the valleys.

The Bali Agan villages

- 25 in Bangli Regency: Bayung Gede, Kedisan, Songan A, Songan B, Trunyan, Bahan, Sekardadi, Abangbatudinding, Suter, Satra, Sukawana, Catur, Belantih, Blandingan, Pinggan, Batur Utara, Batur Selatan, Batur Tengah, Kintamani, Pengotan, Katubihi, Palaktiying (Landih), Penglipuran, Pengiangan and Yangapi;
- 12 in Karangasem Regency: Bungaya, Asak, Timbrah, Tenganan, Bugbug, Ngis, Kesimpar, Sibetan, Ababi, Seraya, Perasi and Padang Kerta);
- 14 in Buleleng Regency: Sidatapa, Tigawasa, Pedawa, Cempaga, Banyuseri, Gobleg, Julah, Sembiran (see Balinese copperplate inscription), Sudaji, Les, Penuktukan, Sambirenteng, Pacung 1, Pakung 2 and Bulian;
- 3 in Gianyar Regency: Taro, Sebatu, Camenggawon and Celuk;
- 2 in Klungkung Regency: Tihingan and Nyalian;
- 2 in Badung Regency: Sulangai and Pelaga;
- 3 in Tabanan Regency: Tengkudak, Wongaya Gede and Jatiluwih.

== Culture ==
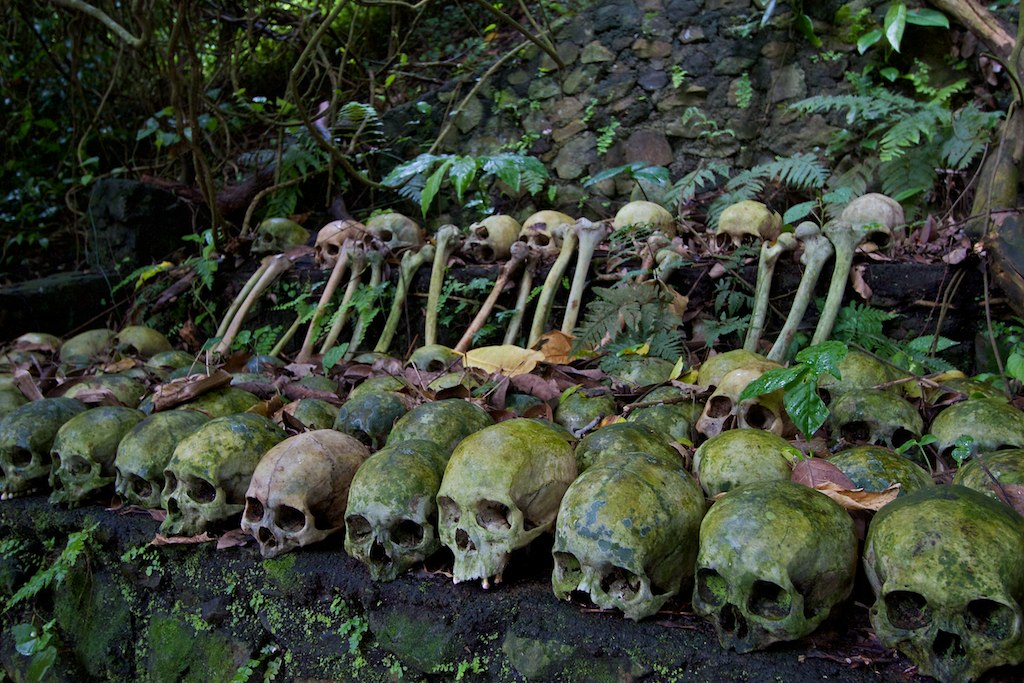
Human skulls in Trunyan

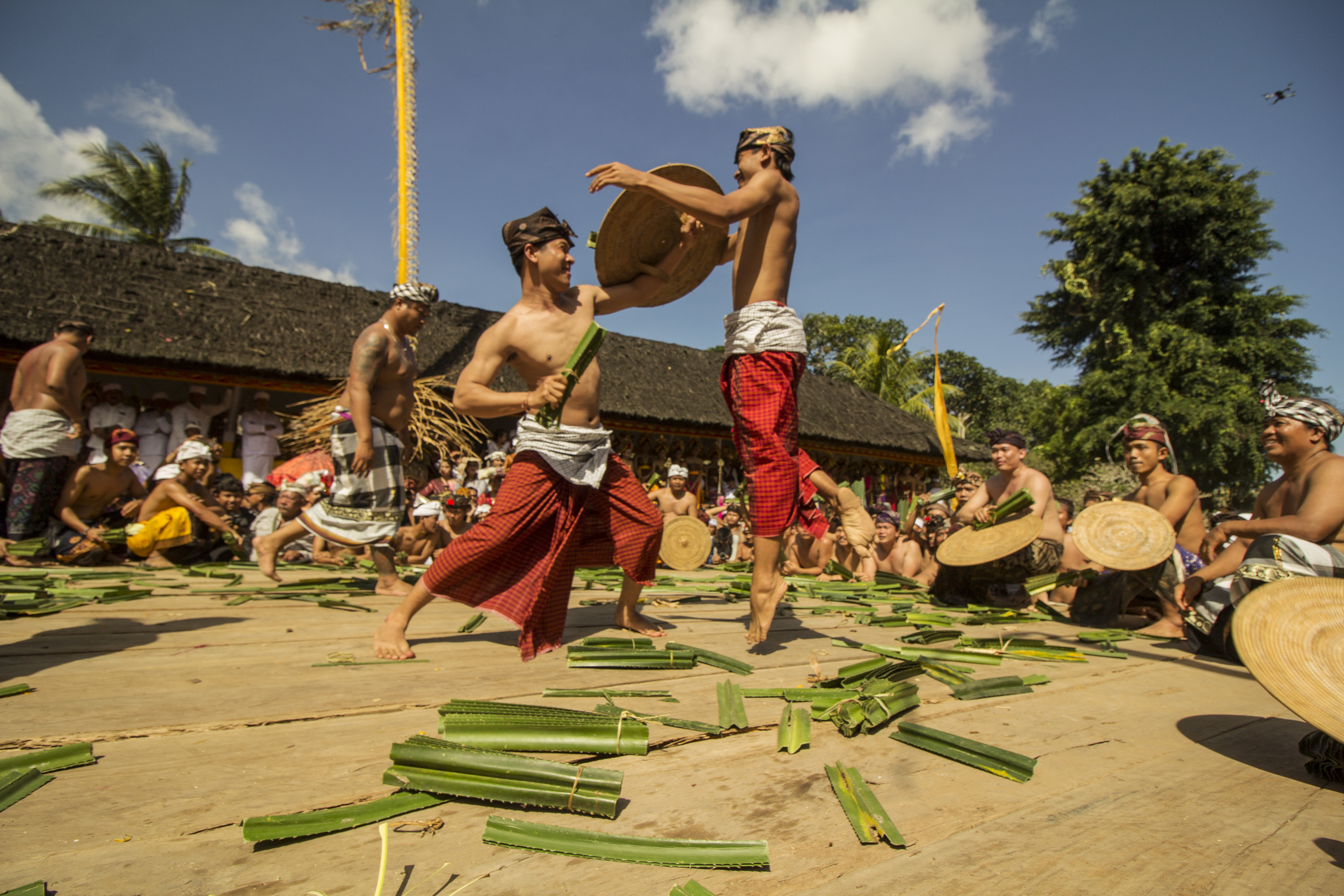
Mekaré-karé or Perang pandan (pandan battle) in Tenganan village, Karangasem

The Bali Aga live in isolated areas in the mountains. Compared to the lowland Balinese, their relative isolation preserved some original Austronesian elements, apparent in Bali Aga architecture. Tourists wishing to visit certain villages must be careful due to the area's geography. While visiting, it is also important to be respectful and quietly observe the preserved way of life the Bali Aga have.

In Tenganan, where tourism is more easily embraced and the people are said to be more friendly, a three-day festival called Udaba Sambah is held during June or July. Tenganan prohibits divorce and polygamy, unlike other villages.

B. Hauser-Schäublin points out that the 20 copperplate inscriptions of Sembiran indicate that the villages of Sembiran and Julah, their culture and society, have seen rapid transformations between the 10th and 12th centuries; and they cannot be said to have perdured unchanged since pre-Hindu times. She notes that these villages were subjected to much outside influence, close as they are to the sea and therefore to the trading route between India and China and the Spice Islands, that touched the north of Bali. Pirates were a constant threat until the arrival of the Dutch, plagues such as cholera were also recurrent. Muslim immigrants left traces too. Archaeological excavations near the coast between Julah, Bangkah and Sembiran show that Indian traders travelled as far as Bali since at least 2000 years ago and it can be assumed that that trade was continuous up until the 10th century, with Julas as a port and as a trading center.

Recent times see drastic socio-economic changes and this ancient culture is being rapidly lost to tourism and modernization. For example, until recently, foraging for wild and semi-wild plants, notably in forest areas, brought more diversity to the diet and an increase in income by selling some plants at traditional markets. These edible plants are still the main source of food in rural areas but their use is increasingly neglected, and the indigenous knowledge of plant uses is being eroded - the latter proving itself to be one of the major threats to the sustainability of biological diversity.

== Language ==
A man speaking Bali Aga Balinese dialect, recorded in Kintamani

The Bali Aga are a multilingual people. The majority speak their mother tongue Balinese Bali Aga dialect, but a minority can also speak standard Balinese, due to being surrounded by other Balinese speakers. Their dialect is slightly different from the common Balinese language. It dates back thousands of years and varies from village to village; the version spoken in the Tenganan village is different from the Trunyan village. Bali Aga people also speak Indonesian as a language of communication between ethnicities. They also speak English for tourists and Kawi/Old Javanese and Sanskrit for religious rituals.

== Craftwork ==
An important part of Bali Aga culture is the complex tie-dye technique used to make Bali's traditional geringsing double ikat. Bali's Tenganan village is the only village that still produces geringsing.

In geringsing, both the cotton warp and weft threads are carefully dyed and cross-dyed before weaving; the finished pattern only emerges as the cloth is woven. According to textile expert John Guy, "the ancestry of Balinese geringsing is far from clear, although some cloths display the unmistakable influence of patola", the silk double ikats produced in Gujarat during the height of the Spice Trade (16-17C). Many of these imported cloths became inspiration for later locally made textiles, but one theory is that the Balinese-made cloths were exported to India and copied there for production to Asian markets. Many have unique Hindu motifs such as a bird's eye view of a mandala with a sacred center from which everything radiates. Others feature designs clearly inspired by patola, for example a design known as the frangipani flower (jepun). The palette of geringsing is typically red, neutral, and black. Geringsing are regarded as sacred cloths, "ascribed supernatural properties, especially to assist in forms of healing, including exorcism." Gering means decease and sing means no.

In Sukawana (Bangli Regency), an inscription dated to 883 AD was found on Mount Kintamani, that lists the occupation of indigo-dyeing (mangnila) and morinda-dyeing (mamangkudu) as being exempt from taxation.

The production of Indigo dye has been traditionally prohibited in a few places of Eastern Indonesia. One such place is the village of Wunga at Cape Sasar in northern East Sumba, seen as the mythical place of origin of the Sumbanese and therefore the place where the dead are lead back by their ancestors. In Wunga, cloths were mud-dyed by steeping them first in a hot bath of tannin-rich barks and leaves, followed by immersion in stagnant mud rich in ferrous salts. Indigo represents a form of reincarnation, whereas the black mud "represents the putrefying stage of the deceased as he pursues his journey to the land of the dead".
The village of Tenganan Pegringsingan (Karangasem Regency) holds a more extreme position on the matter: indigo is considered impure and is entirely forbidden. The first dyeing stage with indigo is thus subcontracted to the neighbouring village of Bugbug.

== See also ==
=== Wikipedia articles ===
- Bali Aga architecture
- Ancestor worship
- Animism
- Balinese people
- Highland Balinese
- Hinduism in Indonesia
- Folk Hinduism
- Pandanus
- Geringsing
- Austronesian expansion

=== Bibliography ===
- Qodim, Husnul (2023). "Nature Harmony and Local Wisdom: Exploring Tri Hita Karana and Traditional Ecological Knowledge of the Bali Aga Community in Environmental Protection". Religious: Jurnal Studi Agama-Agama dan Lintas Budaya. 7 (1): 1–10. doi:10.15575/rjsalb.v7i1.24250.
- Setiawan, Lydia Dewi; Salura, Purnama; Fauzy, Bachtiar (December 2020). "The relationship between traditional activities and the mass-space pattern in Bali Aga Customary Village society – Tenganan Pegringsingan". ARTEKS Jurnal Teknik Arsitektur. 5 (3): 373–390. doi:10.30822/arteks.v5i3.536.
- Yasa, I Wayan Putra; Purnawibawa, Ahmad Ginanjar; Anjliani, Komang Risna (2022). "The Influence of Megalithic Tradition on the Religious System in the Bali Aga Community, Pedawa Village, Buleleng". Proceedings of the 4th International Conference on Law, Social Sciences, and Education, 28 October 2022, Singaraja, Bali.
- Yudantini, Ni Made (2018). "The spatial and settlement pattern in Mabi Hamlet, Belantih Village, Kintamani: conservation of tangible and intangible of Balinese traditional architecture in Bali Aga village". Earth Environmental Science. 213 (213 (IOP Conference)) 012025. Bibcode:2018E&ES..213a2025M. doi:10.1088/1755-1315/213/1/012025.
- Yudantini, Ni Made (2020). "Bali Aga Villages in Kintamani, Inventory of Tangible and Intangible Aspects". Advances in Engineering Research. 192 (EduARCHsia & Senvar 2019 International Conference (EduARCHsia 2019)): 160–165.
- Yudantini, Ni Made (2022). "Bali Aga Villages Documentation in Bangli Regency as Architectural Conservation and Cultural Heritage". Journal of Architecture & Environment. 21 (1): 45–54. doi:10.12962/j2355262x.v21i1.a12809.

=== External links ===
- "Bali Aga: The Original Balinese". indo.com.
- "The Ancient Survival: The Bali Aga". 2022. Archived from the original on 2008-06-22.
- Candidasa travel guide from Wikivoyage
