= Kemben =

Java-Bali traditional clothing

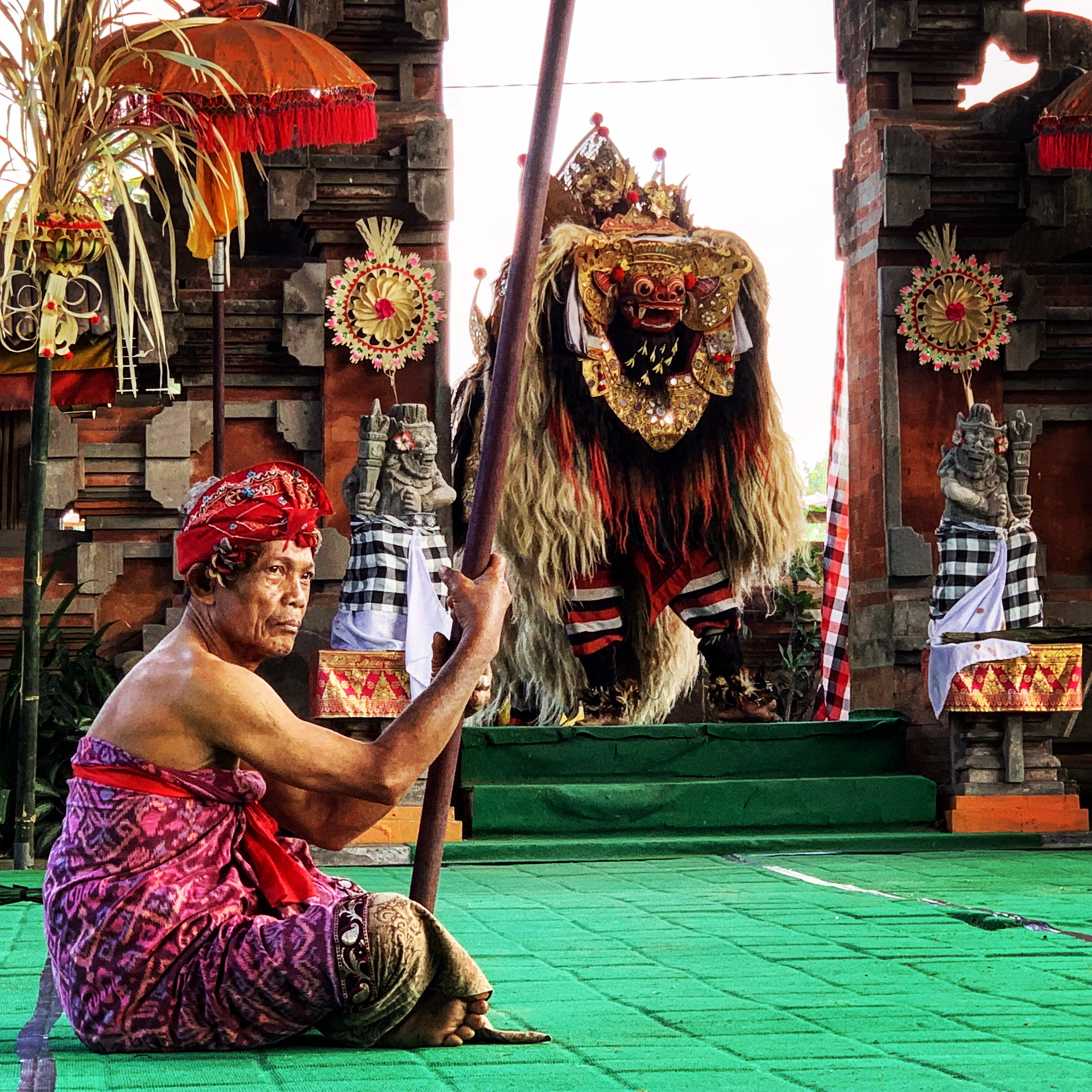
- Balinese man clothed in traditional kemben during Barong dance performance, Bali.
- Type: Traditional female torso wrap
- Place of origin: Java

Kemben (Javanese: ꦏꦼꦩ꧀ꦧꦼꦤ꧀, romanized: kêmbên; Sundanese: ᮊᮨᮙ᮪ᮘᮨᮔ᮪, romanized: keumbeun; Balinese: ᬓᬫᭂᬦ᭄, romanized: kamen) is a form of Native Indonesian torso wrap originally found in traditional native Java (Javanese, Sundanese, Baduy, and Osing) and Bali (Bali Aga and Balinese) clothing cultures. It is made by wrapping a piece of kain (clothes), usually but not limited to batik, tenun, ikat, or any type of fabrics, covering the chest wrapped around one's torso.

== History ==
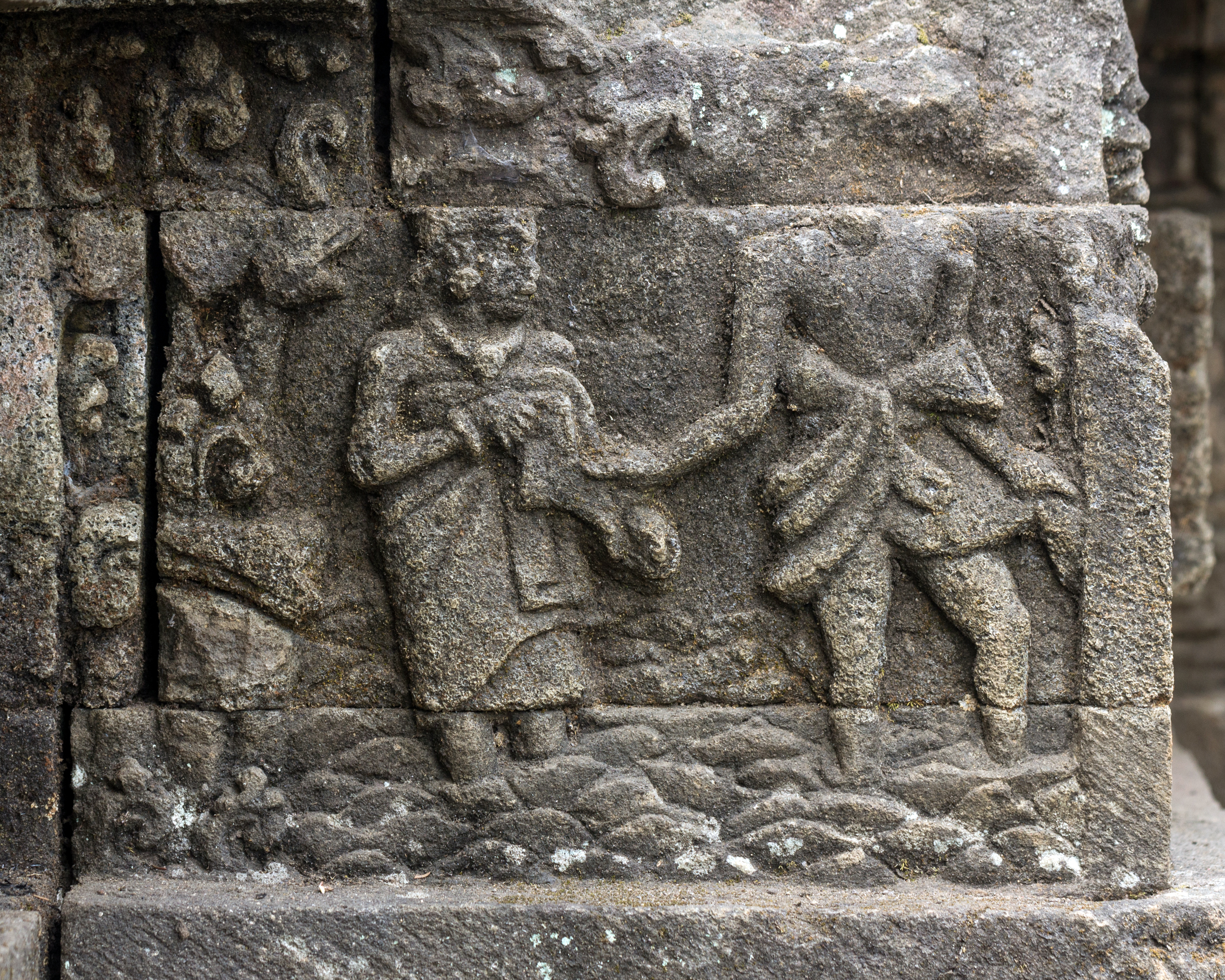
A Javanese woman wearing kemben depicted on 14th-century Majapahit temple reliefs in Jombang, East Java.

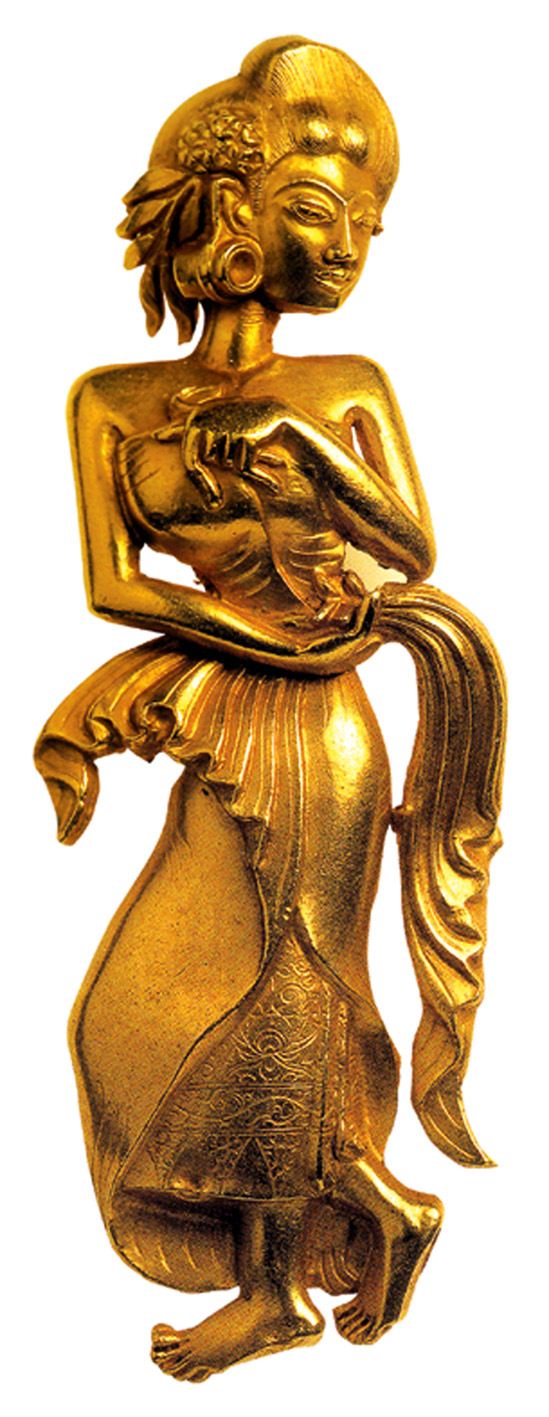
The Bidadari Majapahit, a 14th-century golden celestial apsara in Majapahit style, wearing kemben.

Prior to the prevalence of kebaya, it is believed that kemben was the most popular and common female dress in the ancient and classical period of Java. It was commonly worn in the Majapahit era until the Mataram Sultanate. Today, this shoulder-baring garment still features in many Javanese (and Balinese) rituals, traditional Javanese (and Balinese) dances or palace ceremonies in Javanese (and Balinese) keratons.

The bare shoulders of the kemben may be regarded as a representation of elegance and femininity. In recent decades, however, kemben has fallen out of favor among Javanese Muslim women as they abandoned their traditional fashion and wear Islamic clothing such as the hijab, which was previously uncommon in Indonesia. Today, the tradition of wearing kemben has been preserved and kept alive in the Javanese royal court of Yogyakarta and Surakarta keratons, especially among nobles and abdi dalem (palace servants). However, in recent years, this also had stirred debate about the efforts to preserve classic Javanese court culture being contended by the growing conservative Islamism among the Indonesian Muslims community.

== Uses ==
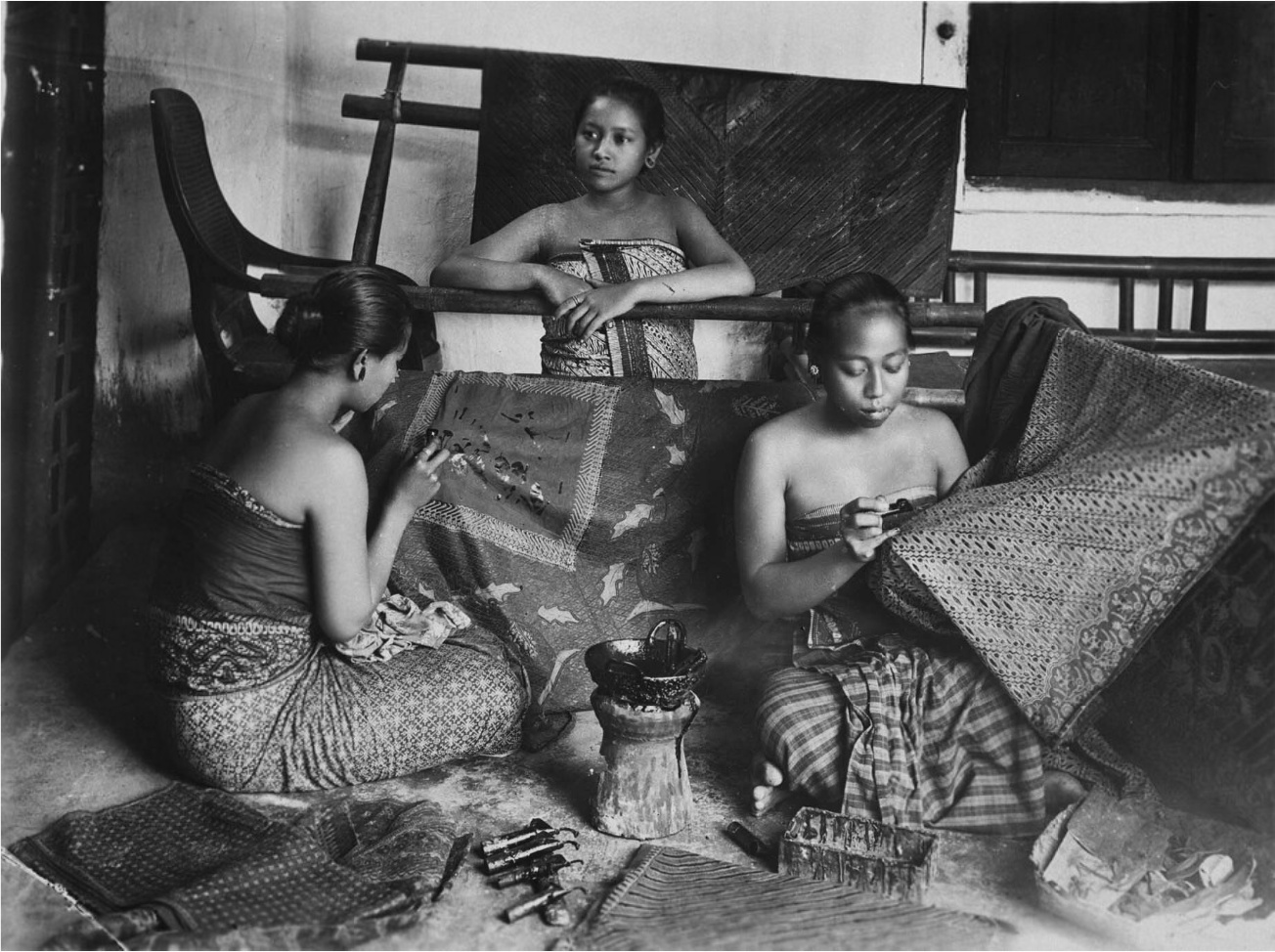
Three Javanese women in kemben making batik clothes in a village in Java, Indonesia. 1800s.

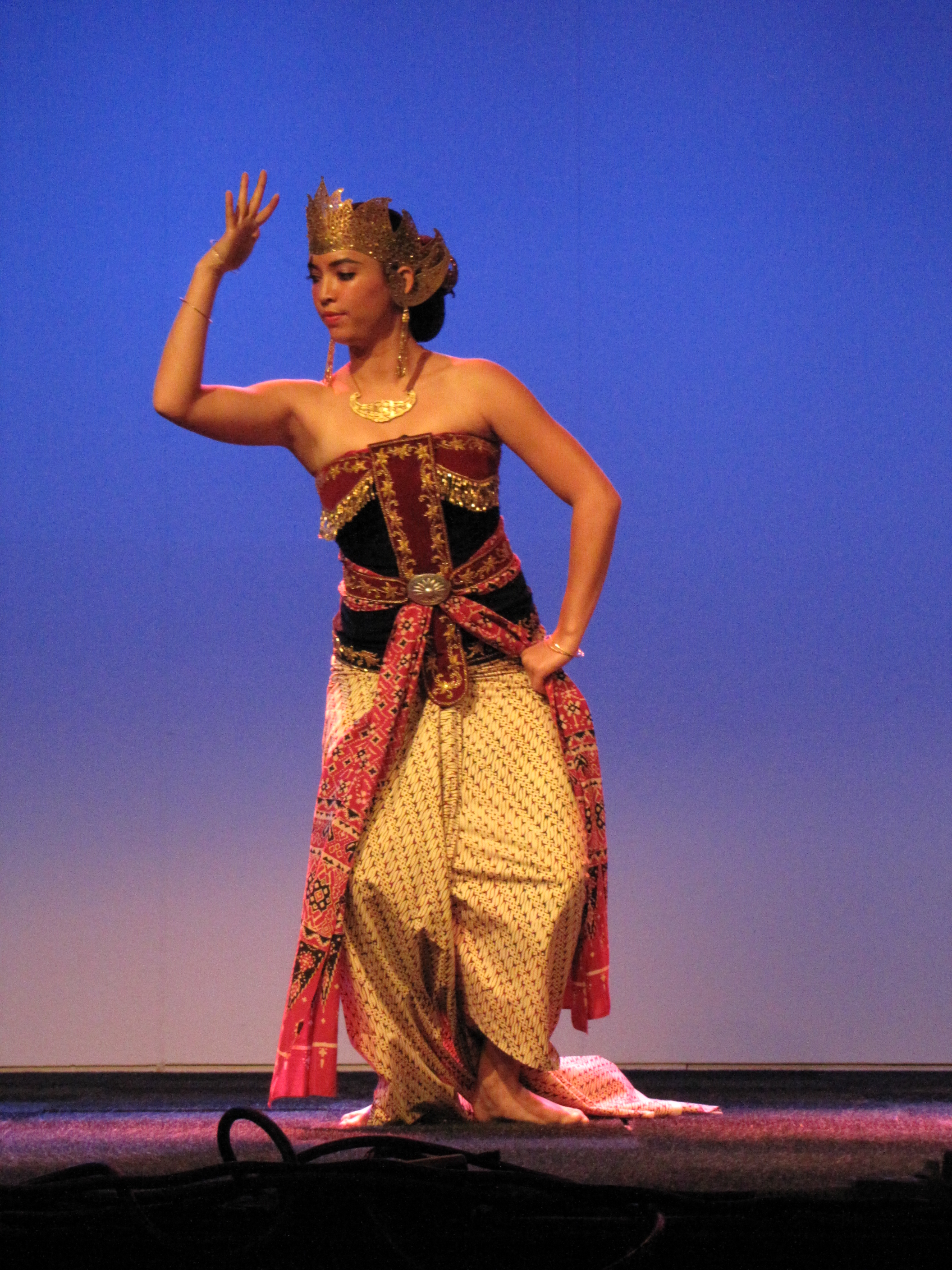
A Srimpi dancer wearing velvet kemben.

Traditional kemben is worn by wrapping a piece of cloth around the torso, folding and securing the edge, tying it with additional rope, and covering it with an angkin, a smaller sash around the abdomen. Traditional Javanese batik kemben worn by palace ladies in keratons are mostly this type of kemben. Today, there is also tight-fitted and tailored kemben secured using buttons, straps or zippers similar to the western corset. The kemben of female Javanese traditional dancers (srimpi or wayang wong) are usually made of tailored velvet corsets.

== Javanese diaspora ==
=== in Europe ===
In Europe, it is oftenly dubbed as akin to European décolletage, however, it is more indigenous by using local fabrics such as batik, ikat, songket, or tenun, and simply secured by folding and slipping the cloth edges and tying the knot. Traditionally, women wear two pieces of clothes; the lower one is wrapped around the hips covering lower parts of the body (hips, thighs, and legs) and is called as kain or sarong, while the piece that is wrapped about the upper body (chest and torso) is called kemben.

=== in the Americas ===
==== Suriname ====
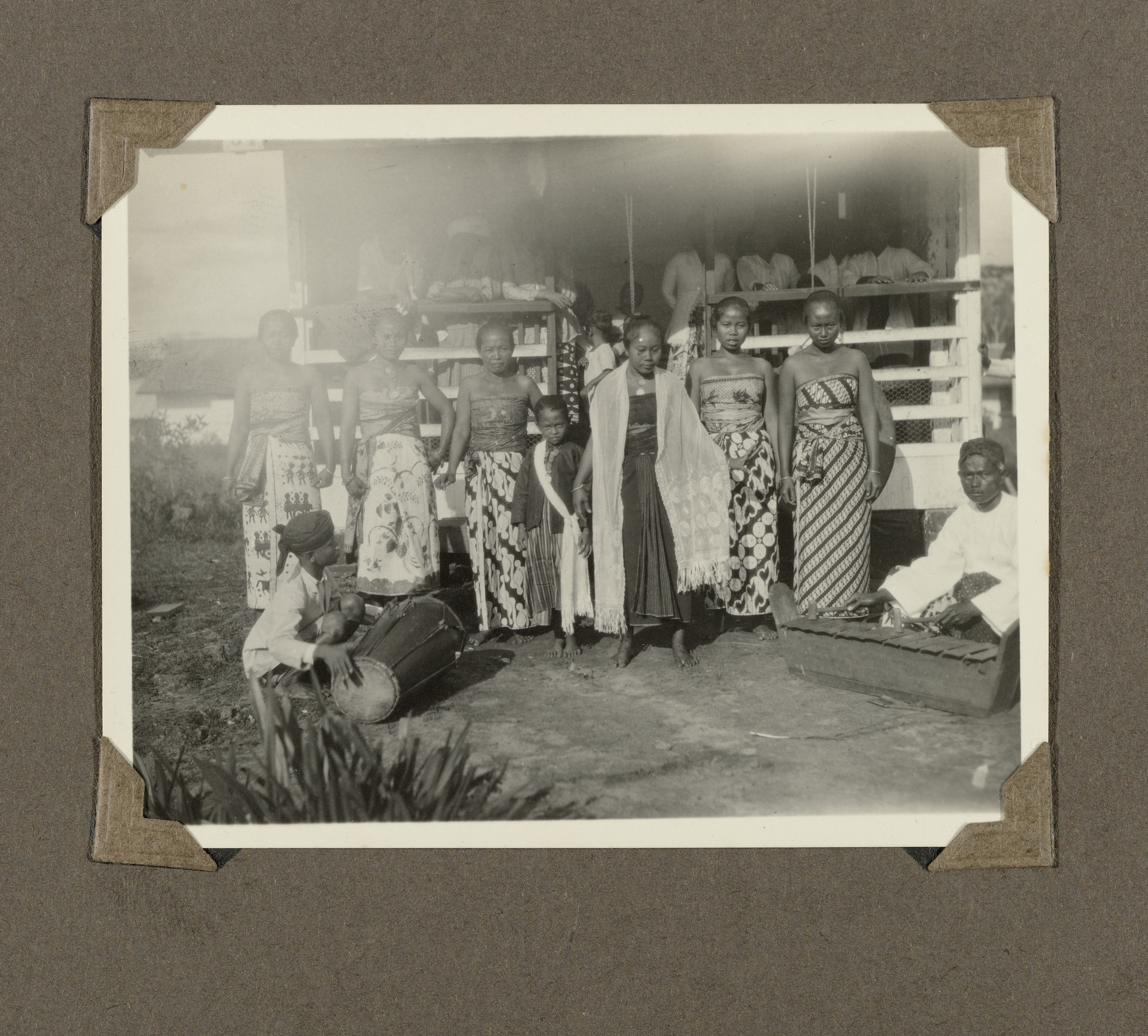
Javanese women clothed in kemben, c. 1925 Suriname.

In the South American country of Suriname, kemben is traditionally worn due to the Javanese diaspora community existence in the country. It is worn in daily life (especially by the elderies) and during special cultural Javanese-related events, such as Java New Year celebration where traditional Javanese dances commonly performed.

=== in Asia ===
In Malaysia, due to the existence of Javanese diaspora (or Indonesian diaspora in general) Javanese bring their own Kemben style that we can see today, however this style is different from Malay people kemban style.

== See also ==
- National costume of Indonesia
- Culture of Indonesia
- Javanese culture
- Kebaya
