= Tejakula, Buleleng =

District in Buleleng Regency, Bali Province, Indonesia

Tejakula
- District
- Location of Tejakula district within Buleleng
- Interactive map of Tejakula
- Country: Indonesia
- Province: Bali
- Regency: Buleleng
- Villages/Sub-districts: 10 villages

Area
  - Total: 98.33 km^{2} (37.97 sq mi)

Population (2025)
  - Total: 78,643
  - Density: 799.8/km^{2} (2,071/sq mi)

Demographics
  - Ethnic groups: Bali Aga; Balinese
  - Religion: Hinduism (Balinese Hinduism • folk Hinduism)
  - Languages: Indonesian (official); Balinese (native); — Bali Aga Balinese; — Lowland Balinese
- Time zone: Indonesia Central Time
- Postal code: 81173

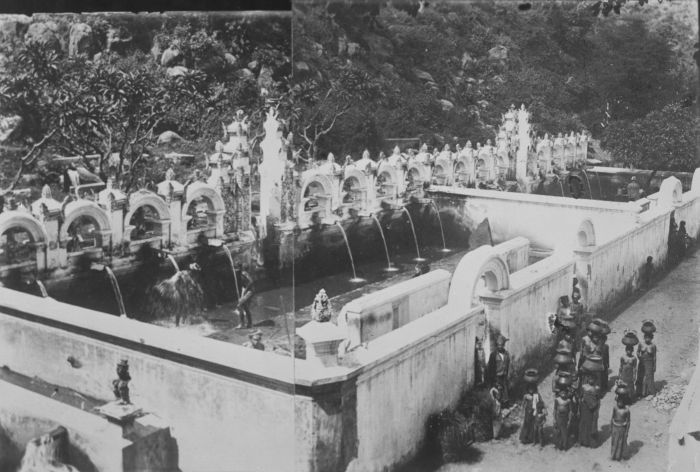
Bathing place, between 1910 and 1921

Tejakula (Balinese: ᬢᬾᬚᬓᬸᬮ) is an administrative district (kecamatan) in the far east of Buleleng regency, northern Bali, Indonesia. It stands on the north-eastern coast of the island. Tejakula is largely inhabited by the Bali Aga people, who are native to the island of Bali.

== Towns and Villages ==
The district is sub-divided into 10 rural villages (desa) - all sharing the post code 81173 - as follows:

- 2001 Sembiran
- 2002 Pacung
- 2003 Julah
- 2004 Madenan
- 2005 Bondalem
- 2006 Tejakula (desa)
- 2007 Les
- 2008 Penuktukan
- 2009 Sambirenteng
- 2010 Tembok

Along the coastal road from north to south are Bangkah, Pacung, Julah, Bondalem, Desa Tejakula, Les (half-mile south of the road), Penuktukan, Sambirenteng and Tembok. Sembiran is 2 km south of Pacung and Madenan is 7 km south-west of desa Tejakula.

== Les ==
Les has an area of 769 hectares; its coastal area spans 135 hectares and its beach is 2 km long. It used to have natural coral reefs and those have been destroyed by unsustainable fishing with explosives (and poison). This, and the subsequent disappearance of sea life, has negatively impacted traditional fishing and coral harvesting. After the evaluation of 19 sites, in 2019 one was chosen to instal spider frame modules at depths of 6 and 10 metres on the seabed and 88 coral fragments of Acropora loripes implanted on them.

== Sembiran ==
Sembiran (or Sambiran) traditionally produces hand-woven cotton cloths, used as traditional festive clothing.
