= Balinese traditional house =

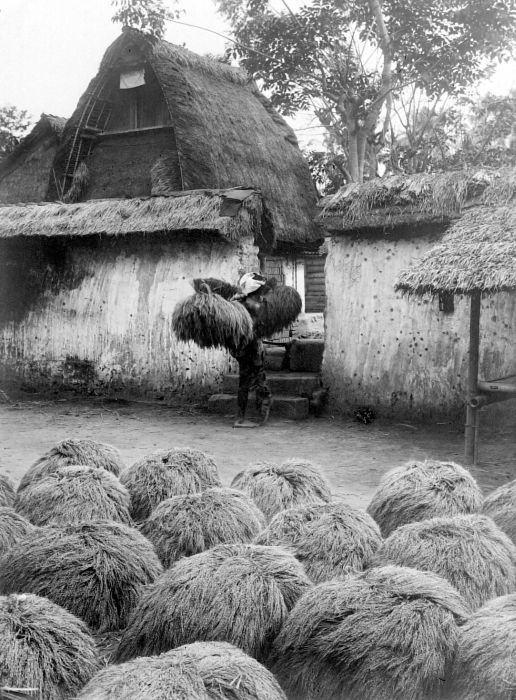
Distinctive shaped lumbung (rice barn) of southern Bali.

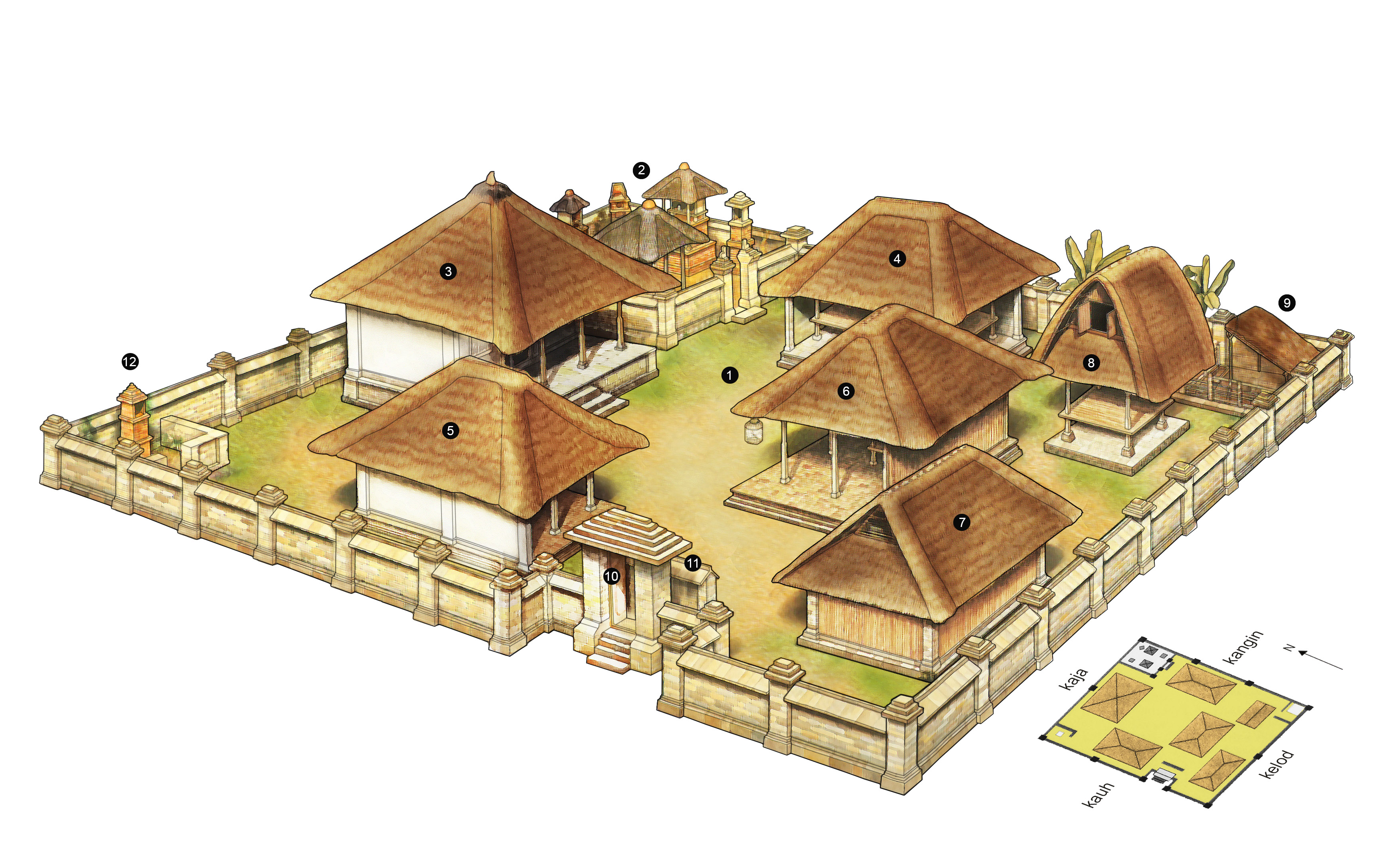
The simplest type of Balinese house compound. Legend: 1. Natah 2. Sanggah Kemulan 3. Bale daja or meten 4. Bale dangin or sikepat 5. Bale dauh or tiang sanga 6. Bale delod or sekenam 7. Paon 8. Lumbung 9. a pigsty 10. Lawang 11. Aling-aling 12. Sanggah pengijeng karang

Balinese traditional house refers to the traditional house of Balinese people in Bali, Indonesia. The Balinese traditional house is the product of a blend of Austronesian animism beliefs later fused with Hindu and Buddhist customs, resulting in a house that is "in harmony" with the law of the cosmos of Balinese Hinduism.

== House compound ==
The Balinese traditional house is built as a house compound, where daily functions are separated not by rooms but by individual structures within an enclosing wall.

== Gallery ==
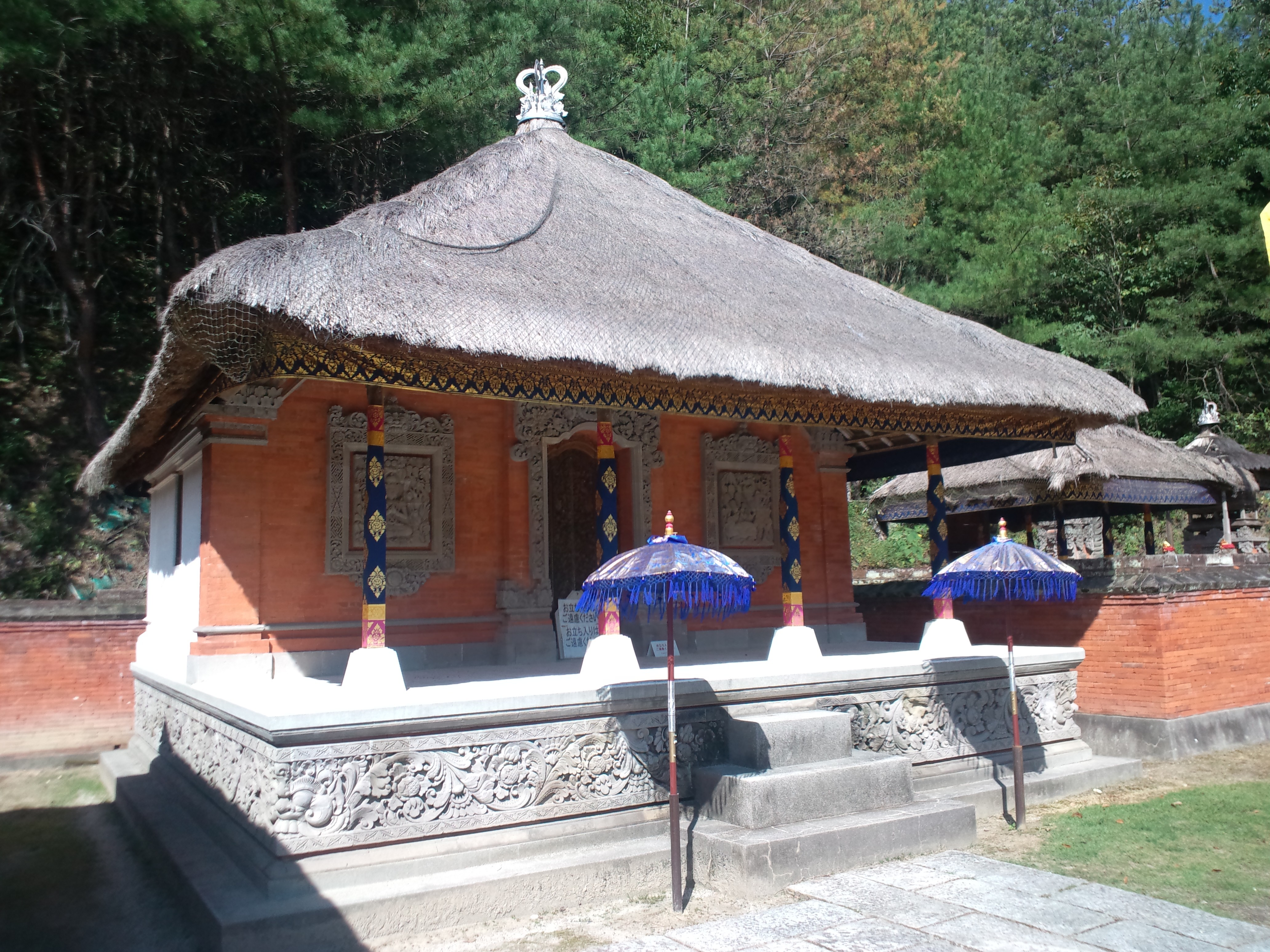
A balé meten (sleeping pavilion) within a Balinese house compound.

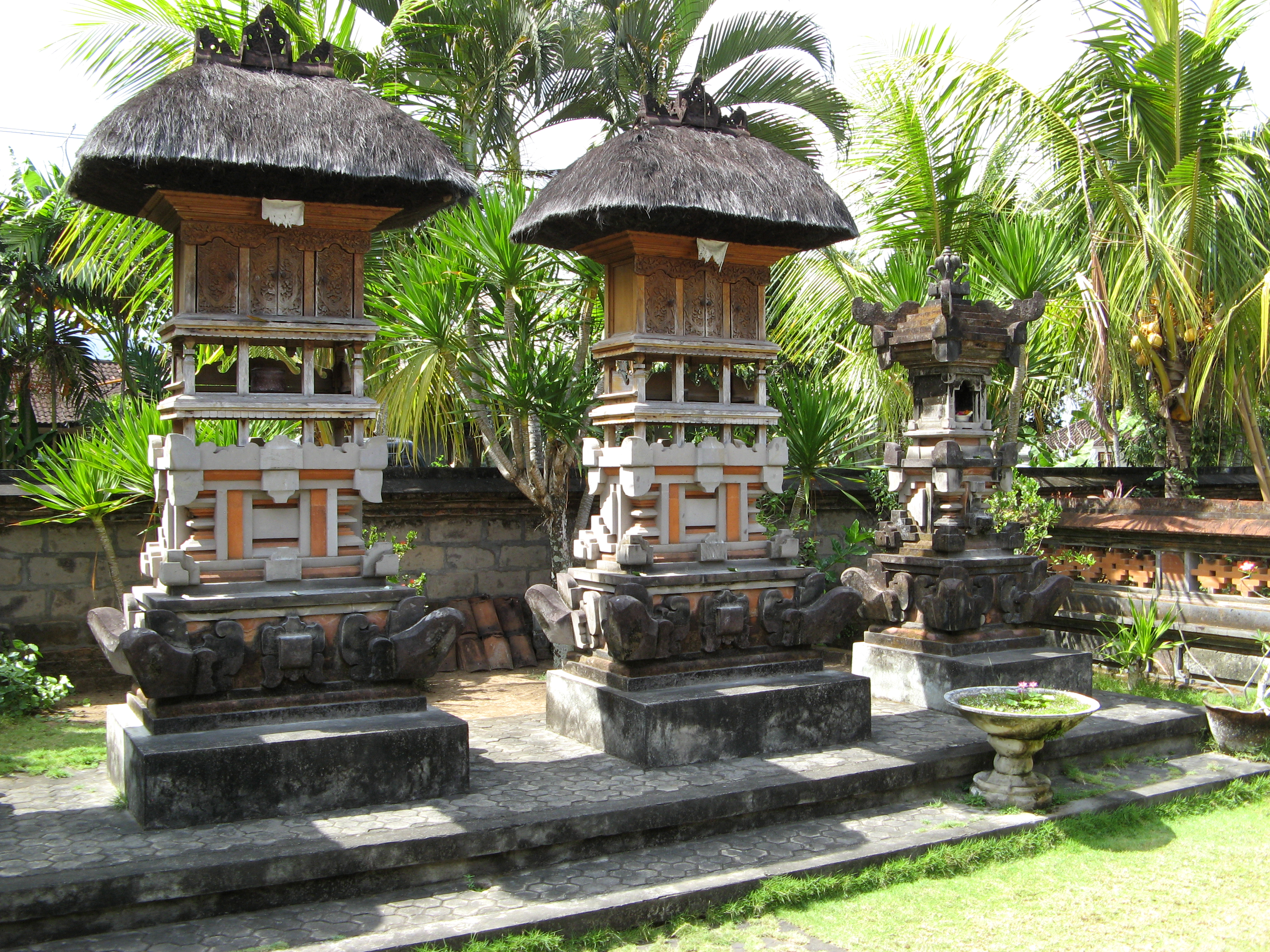
Several house shrines belonging to a Balinese house compound.

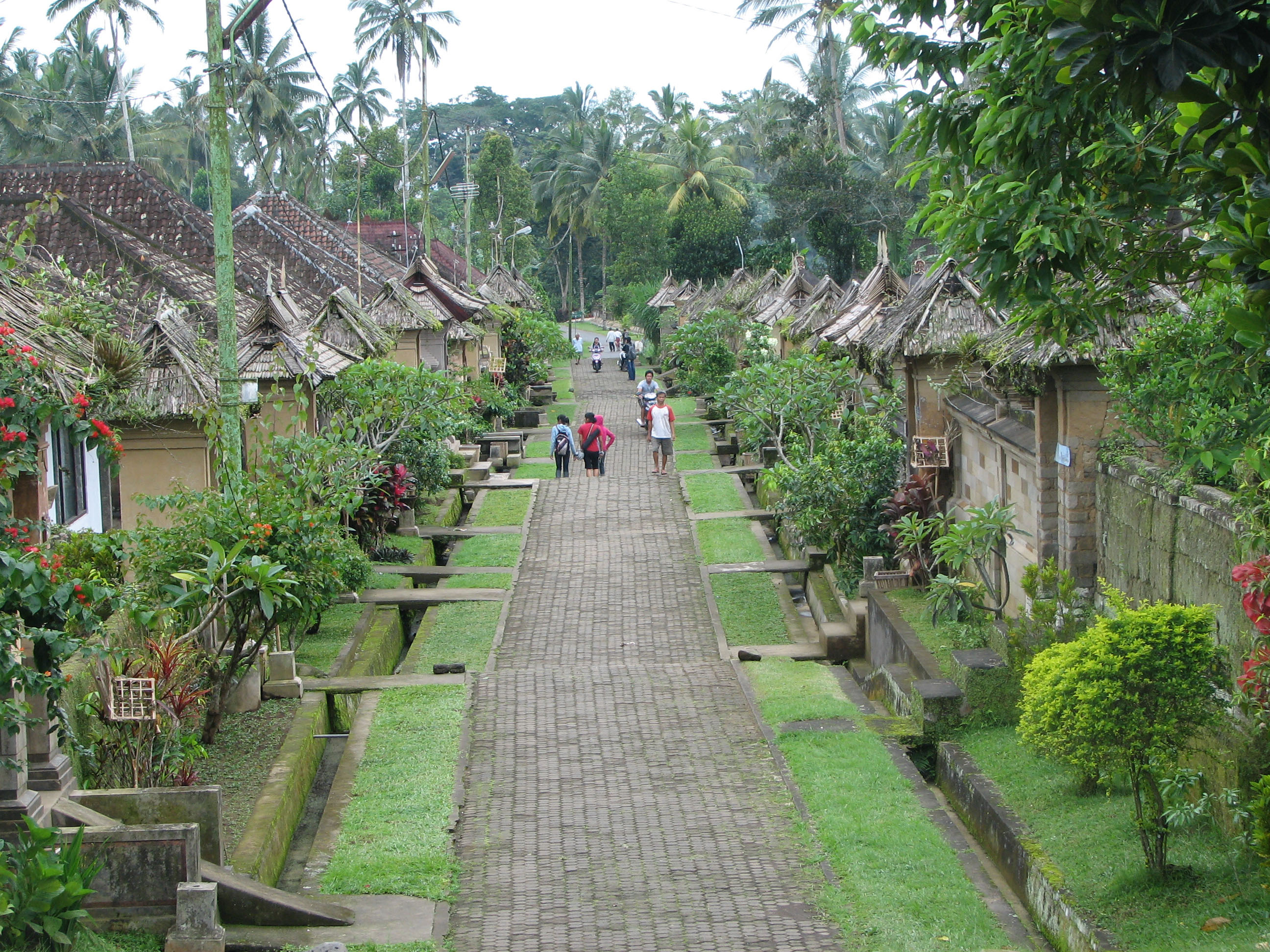
Gate houses marks the entrance to a private compound in this Balinese traditional village of Penglipuran.

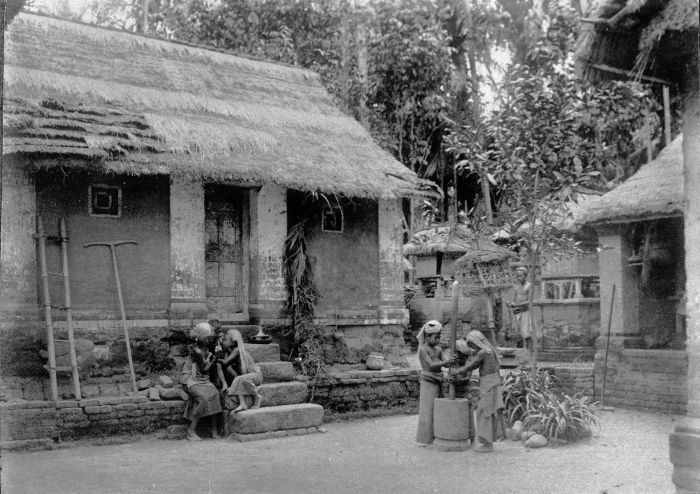
A scene within a Balinese walled residential compound belonged to a common man.

== See also ==
- Balinese architecture
