= Julah =

Coordinates: 8°06′54″S 115°17′56″E

- Interactive map of Julah
- Country: Indonesia
- Region: Lesser Sunda Islands
- Island: Bali
- Regency: Buleleng
- Kecamatan: Tejakula

Julah is a village in Tejakula District in the regency of Buleleng in north-eastern Bali, Indonesia. The village hit the national headlines in 2008 with a bizarre story about a cow which villagers from Julah believed was impregnated by a human and was drowned.
