= Tenganan =

Tenganan Pegringsingan ᬢᭂᬗᬦᬦ᭄ᬧᭂᬕ᭄ᬭᬶᬗ᭄ᬲᬶᬗᬦ᭄
- Location in Bali Tenganan Pegringsingan (Indonesia)
- Coordinates: 8°28′39″S 115°33′59″E
- Country: Indonesia
- Province: Bali
- Time zone: UTC+8 (WITA)

Tenganan Pegringsingan (Balinese script: ᬢᭂᬗᬦᬦ᭄ᬧᭂᬕ᭄ᬭᬶᬗ᭄ᬲᬶᬗᬦ᭄) or Pageringsingan is a village in the regency of Karangasem in East Bali, Indonesia. It is known for the gringsing or geringsing, double ikat textiles woven in only 3 places in the world; and for its gamelan selunding or Gambelan selonding music played on iron metallophones.

Before the 1970s it was known by anthropologists as a secluded society in the archipelago. Rapid changes have occurred in the village since the 1970s, such as the development of local communications by the central government, the opening up to tourism, and the breaking of the endogamic rules.

Tourists are attracted to Tenganan by its unique Bali Aga culture that still holds to the original traditions, ceremonies, and rules of ancient Balinese, and its unique village layout and architecture.

== Historical legend of Tenganan Pegringsingan ==
According to legend, the people of Tenganan Pegringsingan were selected by the Hindu god of storms and warfare Indra to administer a territory that was conceived following his divine plan to be a microcosm of the world. They were instructed to use every means to keep it pure and clean. The concept of territorial, bodily and spiritual purity and integrity is of paramount importance in the village.

Another variation of this legend is of the magical horse Uccaisrawa, of King Udayana, ruler of the 11th century kingdom of Bedahulu. The horse was to be sacrificed but escaped. The king was distraught and sent search parties out to find him. A group of trusted servants, men from the Peneges family were assigned to search the eastern area of the island in the area of Karangasem. The king had promised a huge reward to whoever found Uccaisrawa, however, when they did find him, he had died of exhaustion.

The king rewarded the finders with the land for as far as the smell of the dead horse could be detected. The men of Peneges dismembered the horse and carried the parts to various places around the place where the horse had died. Unknown to the king's men, the Peneges men had hidden portions of the dead horse into their clothes, so the rotten smell followed them everywhere until the king's men decided it was enough land and left.

The Peneges men brought their families to the place called ngetengahang which means "to move to the middle", a valley now known as Tenganan Pegringsingan. It also is named after the double ikat geringsing cloth that Indra taught the women to weave. It sparkled with star motifs that emulated his divine realm.

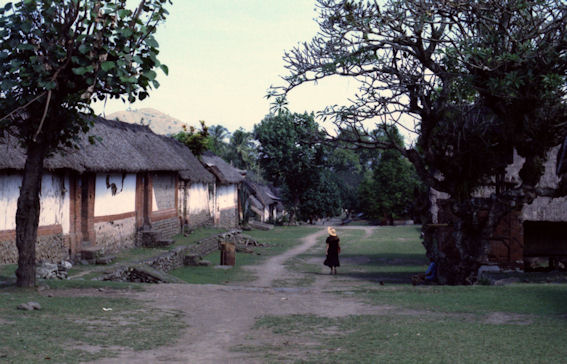
The main concourse of Tenganan Pegringsingan village, 1981

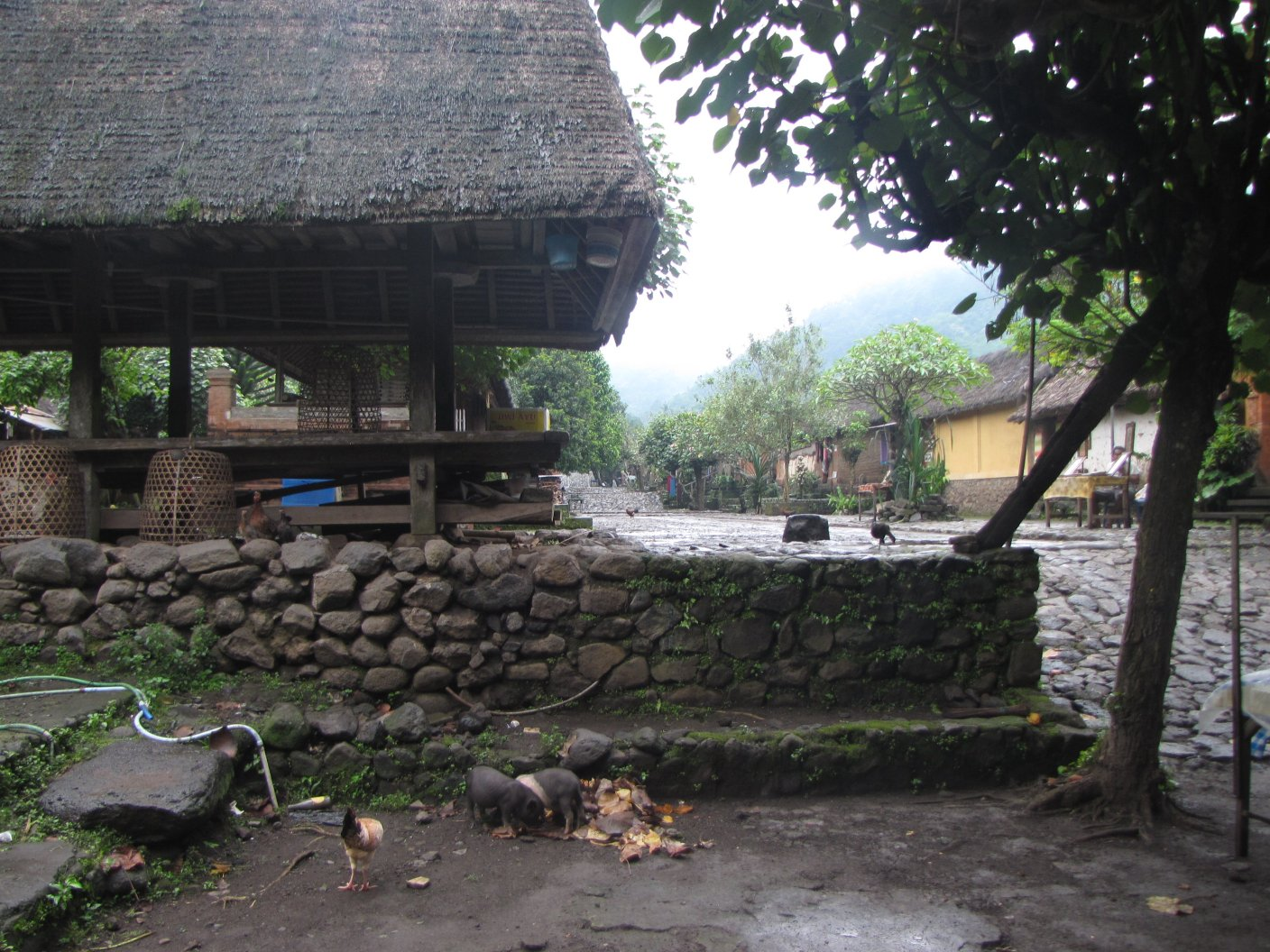
2002 view of the main concourse

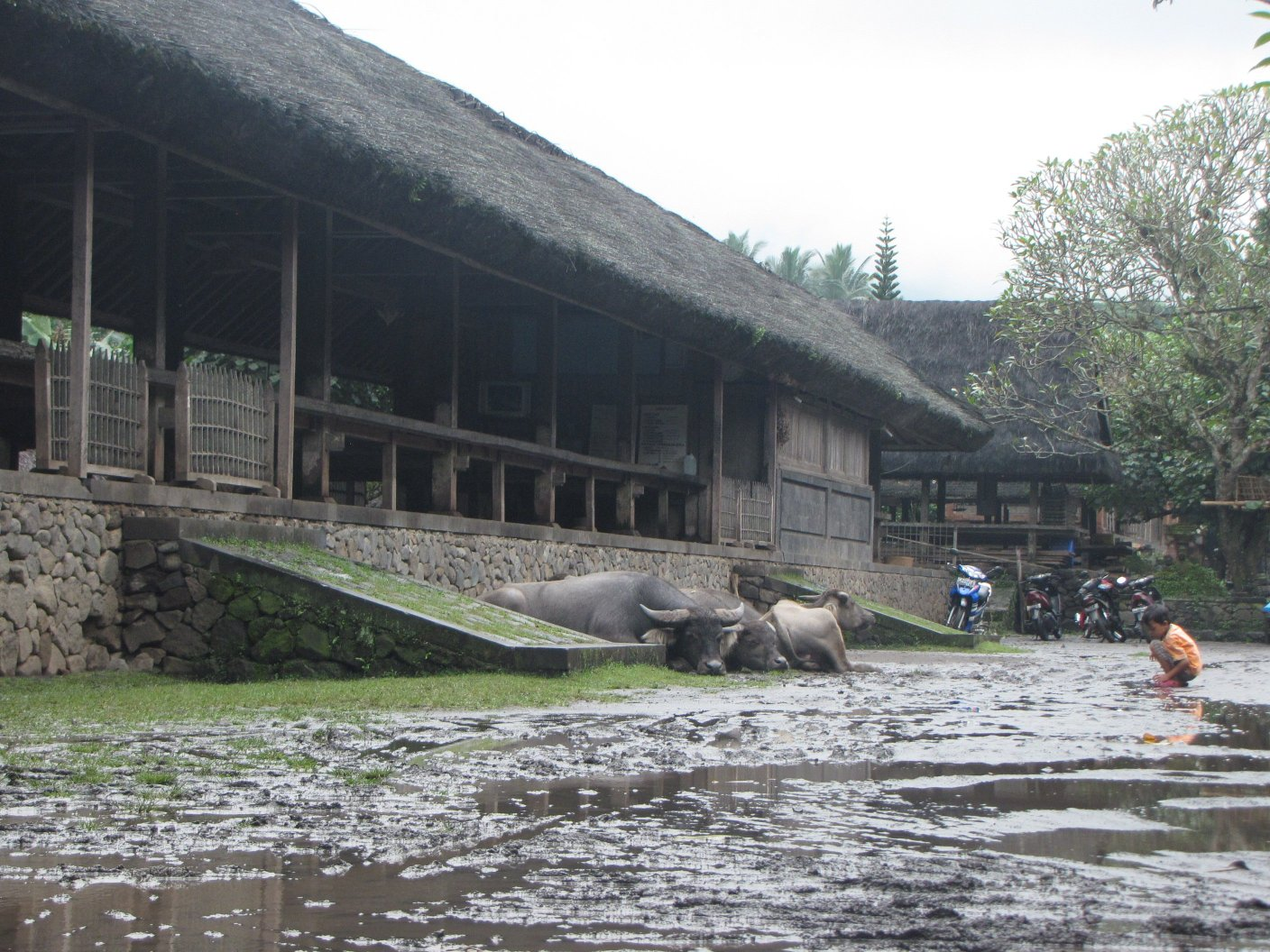
2011

== Origin of the people of Tenganan Pegringsingan ==
The people of Tenganan Pegringsingan are called Bali Aga—the original Balinese. They descend from the pre-Majapahit kingdom of Bedahulu. There are strict rules as to who is allowed to live in the village. Only those born in the village can stay in the village and become full members of the community. There are rules regarding marriage and anyone who marries outside of the village has to leave. A strict protocol regarding marriages among the kin groups have steered the Tengananese through the genetic perils of intermarriage although with increasing contact with the outside world these rules have relaxed somewhat.

== Village layout ==
Houses in Tenganan Pegringsingan village are built on either side of the uphill to downhill concourse with their doors opening onto it. The entrances of the houses are narrow, only allowing one person to enter or leave at any one time. Entrance to and exit from the village is through the gate at the downhill end. On either side of the entrance are two small temples.

Across from these is the long balé agung, where the administrative decisions for the village are made. Next to that is the drum tower, kul-kul. The kul-kul is beaten 21 times each morning to start the day. Up the center are a series of communal pavilions (balé patemon) for formal and informal meetings, and ceremonial gatherings. At the northern end is the village temple Pura Puseh, the temple of origin.

== Rites and Rituals ==
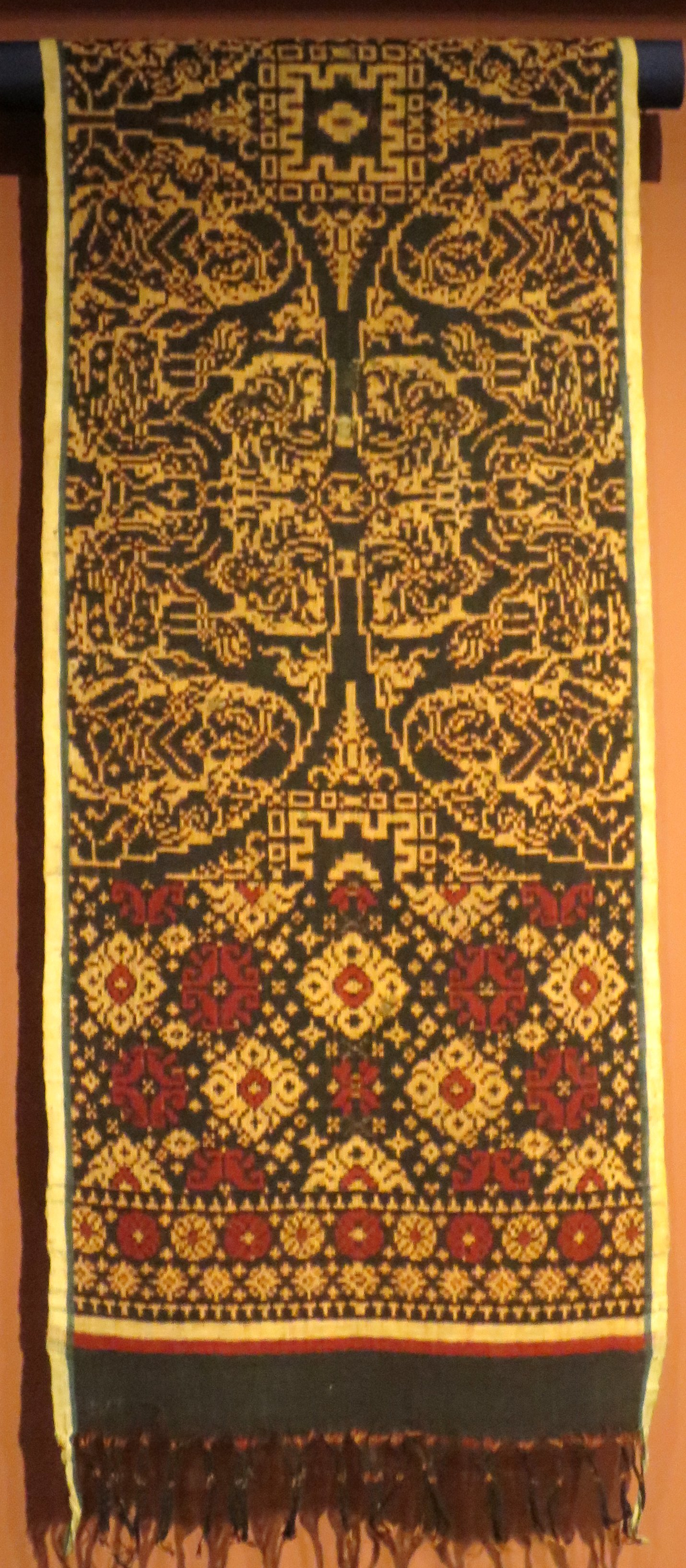
Geringsing selendang (woman's ceremonial shoulder cloth), Honolulu Museum of Art

Many of the life-cycle rituals of the Tengananese are similar to those of the Balinese in general, but have subtle differences. Some ceremonies are unique. One of the distinguishing features is the use of geringsing or double ikat cloth. By virtue of their magical qualities geringsing are not only capable of keeping impurities and danger out of the village, but also shield and protect humans from harmful influences during rites of passage as they transition from one phase of life to the next.

The Tengananese receive their first geringsing at the hair cutting ritual. The cut hair is placed in a basket which is placed on a folded geringsing on the balé tengah, on which the Tengananese both enters and leaves the world.

In the ceremony that admits a boy or girl to the youth association of the village, they are carried dressed in geringsing cloth on their father's right shoulder. In the concluding ceremony of teruna nyoman which is the initiation, the candidates wear a geringsing and a keris or dagger.

For the tooth filing ceremony, an essential rite of passage for all Balinese Hindus, the participants' pillow is covered by geringsing.

After death the genitals of the deceased in Tenganan are covered by a geringsing hip sash. These cloths may not be used again and so usually are sold. For muhun soul purification rites, an effigy of the dead is carried in a geringsing shoulder cloth.

In the wedding ceremony the groom invites his in-laws to visit his parents home where the couple, dressed in festive geringsing clothing, sit while relatives bring symbolic gifts which are placed on a geringsing cloth.

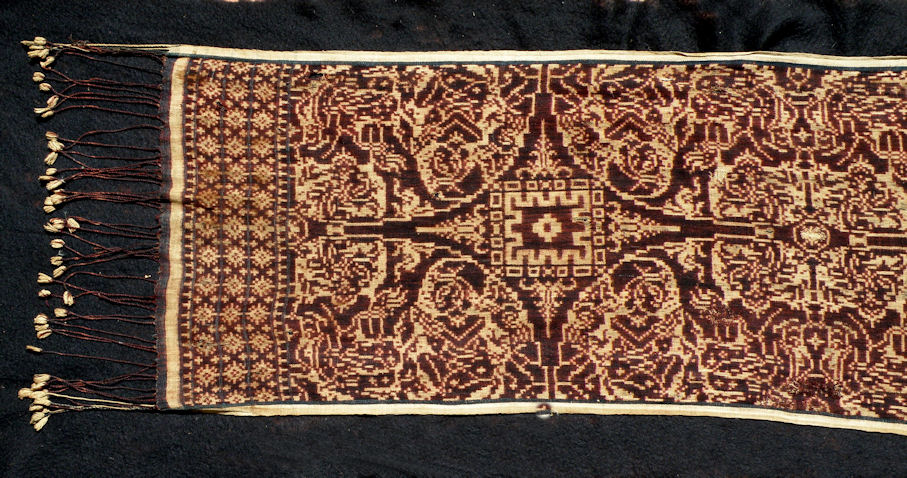
Antique geringsing wayang from Tenganan
coll. Balique Arts of Indonesia

== Bibliography ==
- Sardiana, I Ketut; Purnawan, Ni Luh Ramaswati (October 2015). "Community-based Ecotourism in Tenganan Dauh Tukad: An Indigenous Conservation Perspective" (pdf). Kajian Bali. 5 (2): 347–368.
- Setiawan, Lydia Dewi; Salura, Purnama; Fauzy, Bachtiar (December 2020). "The relationship between traditional activities and the mass-space pattern in Bali Aga Customary Village society – Tenganan Pegringsingan". ARTEKS Jurnal Teknik Arsitektur. 5 (3): 373–390.
- Sumarmi, Sumarmi; Bachri, Syamsul; Mutia, Tuti; Yustesia, Arisius; Fathoni, Muhammad Naufal; Muthi, Muhammad Aunal; Nuraini, Sismi Gusty (December 2020). "The deep ecology persepective of awig-awig: local tribal forest preservation laws in Tenganan cultural village, Indonesia". Journal of Sustainability Science and Management. 15 (8): 102–113.
