= Odisha Ikat =

Dyeing technique originating in India

- Geographical indication
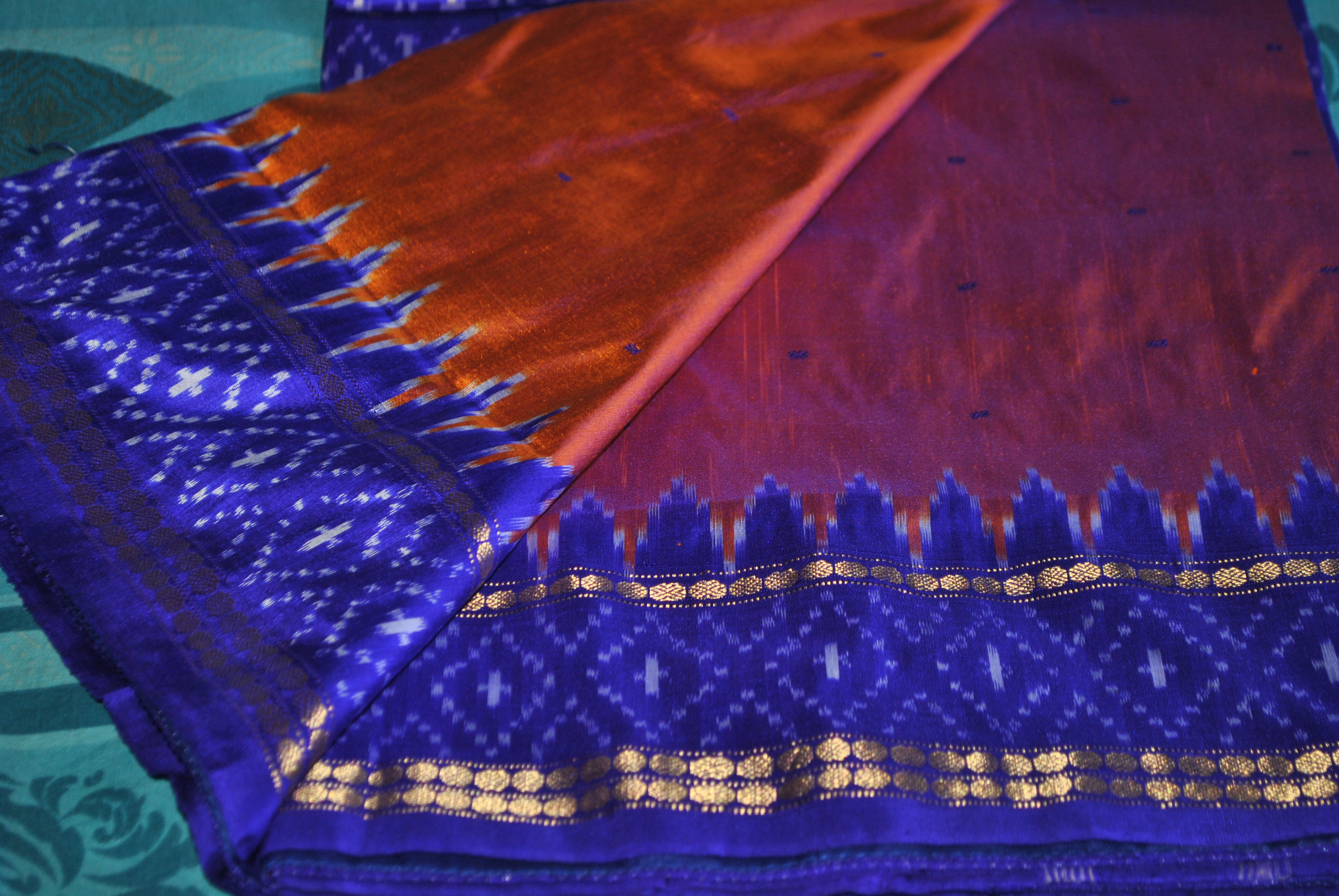
- Sambalpuri Bandha (Ikat) from Sambalpur, Odisha
- Type: Silk
- Area: Odisha
- Country: India
- Registered: 2007

Odisha Ikat, is a kind of ikat known as Bandhakala and Bandha, a resist dyeing technique, originating from Indian state of Odisha. Traditionally known as "Bandhakala"', "Bandha", '"Bandha of Odisha", it is a geographically tagged product of Odisha since 2007. It is made through a process of tie-dyeing the warp and weft threads to create the design on the loom prior to weaving. It is unlike any other ikat woven in the rest of the country because of its design process, which has been called "poetry on the loom". This design is in vogue only at the western and eastern regions of Odisha; similar designs are produced by community groups called the Bhulia, Kostha Asani, and Patara. The fabric gives a striking curvilinear appearance. Saris made out of this fabric feature bands of brocade in the borders and also at the ends, called anchal or pallu. Its forms are purposefully feathered, giving the edges a "hazy and fragile" appearance. There are different kinds of bandha saris made in Odisha, notably Khandua, Sambalpuri, Pasapali, Kataki and Manibandhi.

This silk has been registered for protection under the Geographical indication of the Trade Related Intellectual Property Rights (TRIPS) agreement. In 2007, it was listed as "Odisha Ikat" under the GI Act 1999 of the Government of India, with registration confirmed by the Controller General of Patents Designs and Trademarks under Classes 23, 24 and 25 as Yarn and Threads Tied and Dyed for Textile use, Textile and Textile Goods, and Clothing respectively vide application number 22.

== Location ==
The villages where this art is practiced are Mankedia in Balasore or Mayurbhanj district. In the Western Odisha, it is woven in Barpali, Remunda, Jhiliminda, Mahalakata, Singhapali, Sonepur, Patabhadi, Sagarpali, Tarabha, Biramaharajpur, Subalaya, Kendupali, Jaganathpali, and Kamalapur of Bargarh district and Sonepur district. In the Cuttack district it is made in the villages of Badamba, Nuapatna, Maniabadha, Narashinpur, Tigiria.

== History ==
The history of this silk art is linked to the Lord Jagannath worship practice which is a tradition in Odisha. Every colour used in the fabric reflects a symbolic concept of Jagannath worship: the four primary colours used in keeping with this tradition are white, black, yellow, and red, with green added at a later date. These colours are said to denote the past, present, and future, to the Vedas and the Gods. It is also inferred that the Ikat silk art came into existence by copying the temple architecture which existed much earlier.

== Process ==
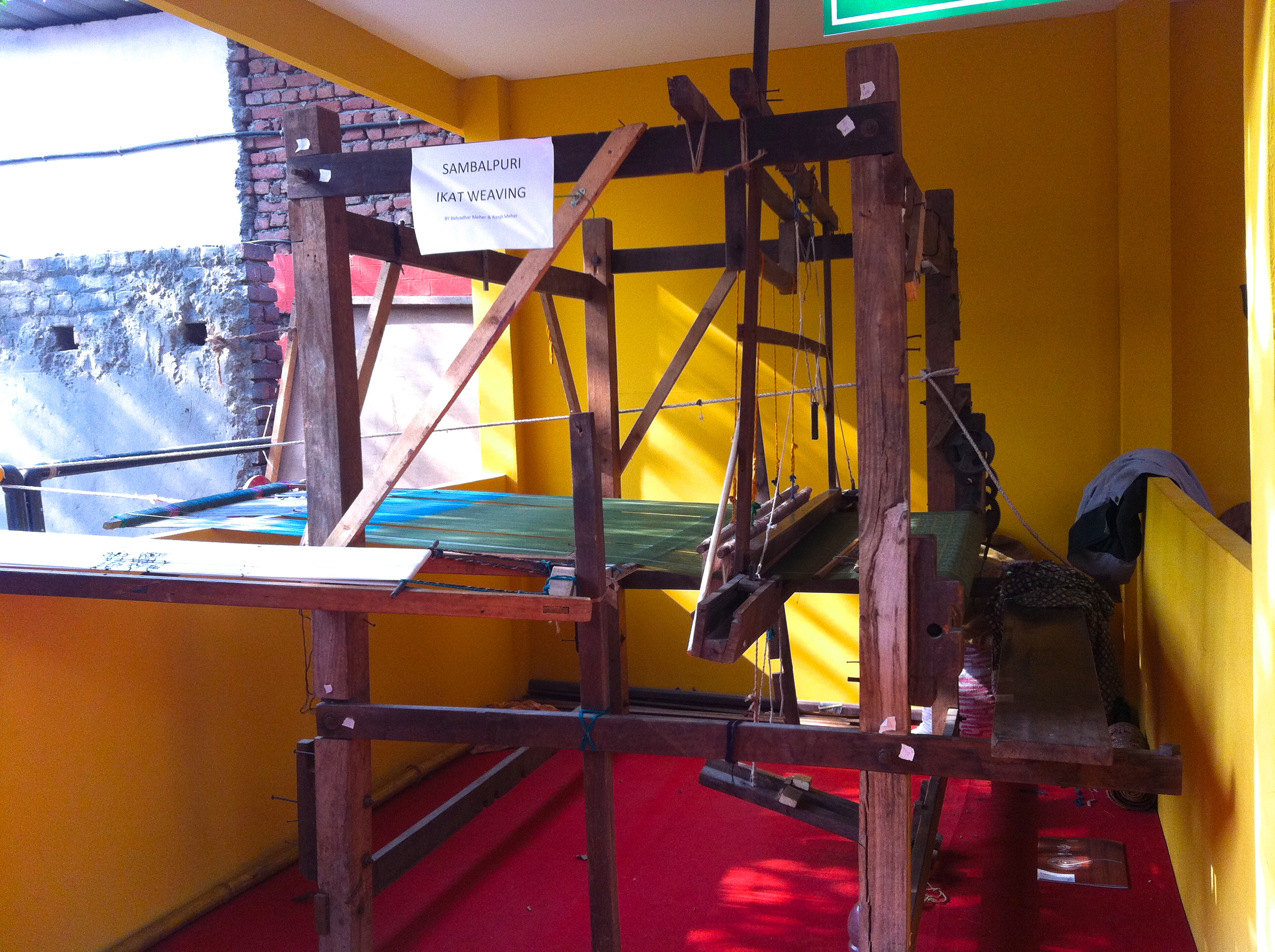
Double Ikat weaving loom in Sambalpur, Orissa

The pattern on the silk fabric evolves through a process of dyeing the warp and weft threads (yarns of very fine quality) prior to the weaving process. This differs from other methods in which yarns of various colours are woven, or in which patterns are printed on the fabric. To create the coloured design, other cloth is affixed to the yarns at specific locations on the loom. The dye is absorbed by the cloth which, when it is removed from the loom, leaves the yarn dyed at the places where it touched the yarn. A single dyeing will leave the yarn spotty in colour. More detailed designs are produced through an eight-stage process of tying and dyeing the yarn, which requires a high degree of skill and time. It is also the practice to tie the weft threads and occasionally the warp threads to transfer colour to the untied part. More colours are added by repeating the process of tying and dyeing on previously coloured parts; in this way, many colours are added to give the fabric a very bright and distinctive shade.

Another notable feature in this Ikat is that it depicts the same colourful design motif on both its front and back sides. No additional yarn is required to produce this effect. The designs evolve during the tying and dyeing process according to the imagination of the craftsman, who does not follow any predesigned pattern but creates the design as he works.

The designs developed on the Ikat are generally of birds, various animals, rudraksh beads, geometric designs, dice, temple towers, and pinnacles. The silk fabric made at Nuapatna in the Cuttack district is woven with Ikat yarn as hymns from the Gitagovinda, and this fabric adorns the idols at the Jagannath Temple daily. The Ikat produced by Bhullas from Western Odisha is considered superior in both the use of the fabric and pattern (which include double Ikat) compared to the product from Eastern Odisha.

The process of making a sari of Ikat by hand takes about seven months and involves two craftsmen, as the production goes through 14 stages of creation. In addition to saris, Odisha Ikat is used to produce bolts of fabric, bed linens, tablecloths, and dupatta scarves.

== See also ==
- Patola, Ikat textile from Gujarat
- Pochampally, Ikat textile from Telangana and Andhra Pradesh
- Puttapaka, Ikat textile from Telangana and Andhra Pradesh
