= Puttapaka Saree =

Puttapaka Saree is a saree made in Puttapaka village, Samsthan Narayanpuram mandal in Nalgonda district, India. It is known for its unique Puttapaka tie and dye style of sarees.

== The Weave ==
The ikat is warp-based unlike most other ikats designed predominantly on weft. The labour-intensive double ikat [warp and weft] is their strength. The warp design requires linear tying of the silk yarn strands. The unique design focus is on symmetry without undermining aesthetics. It closely resembles Sambalpuri saree.

== Tehliya Rumal ==
Tehliya Rumal an oily handkerchief made in Puttapaka which was awarded with GI tag. Telia Rumal is a unique tie and dye technique that uses oil for the treatment of the yarn that helps it retain softness and has a distinct smell of gingelly oil.

== Cottage industry ==
The community of weavers involved are Puttapaka Padmashalis. The weavers sell their sarees for Rs.2000 locally. Noted handloom designer, Gajam Anjaiah is known for the Puttapaka designs. But the Puttapaka sarees are marketed as Pochampally sarees and often sold under their name and not as Puttapaka saree.

== Fourth highest civilian award (Padma Shree Award) ==
Gajam Anjaiah received Padma Shri award in 2013 for Art-Handloom Weaving category. Gajam Govardhana received Padma Shri award in 2011 for Art-Handloom Weaving category.

== See also ==
- Khadi
- Khādī Development and Village Industries Commission (Khadi Gramodyog)
