= Telia Rumal =

Method for the oil treatment of yarn

Telia Rumal is a method for the oil treatment of yarn. It originated from Chirala in Andhra Pradesh. At Chirala, in the Bapatla district of Andhra Pradesh where the craft started, the weavers had virtually stopped making Telia Rumals. People who acquired skill in this dying art took the lead to introduce this in Puttapaka village of Yadadri district in Telangana. Recently Puttapaka Telia Rumal was accorded with Geographical indication (GI) tag.

== History ==
These rumals were patronised by Nizams of Hyderabad, who commissioned elaborate pieces.

Gajam Govardhana popularized the tradition and revived the art of telia rumal which was then dying. today his contributions to revival of Telia Rumal has brought this sustainable, natural process of art to an international level.

== Process ==
It is an art of Ikat tradition using natural vegetable dyes.
