= Days of Marigolds =

Days of Marigold is a silent short film directed by Mainak Misra. The film revolves around subject of cycle of dreams, reflections, hope, longing and nostalgia with a silhouette-like sepia tone. The film was shot at the banks of Pochampally village lake, located approximately 30 km away from Hyderabad, Telangana. The film has common people cast and not professional actors.

== Plot ==
The plot of the short starts with two brothers. The elder brothers leaves the village and the younger one always returns to the place they parted. On every return, a period of life is shown – from childhood till old age.

== Awards and recognition ==
- Official Selection, The Mediterranean Film Festival (MedFF), Sicily, Italy
- Official Selection, Move Me Productions Belgium-Film Festival, Antwerp, Belgium
- Official Selection, Yecora International Film Festival, Yecora, Mexico
- Official Selection, Art Quake Kyoto 2019 (Creativity Biennale of Art Exhibitions & Film Festival), Kyoto, Japan
