= Gajam Govardhana =

Indian weaver

- Born: 1 September 1949 (age 77); Putapakka, Nalgonda district, Andhra Pradesh, India
- Occupation: Weaver
- Awards: Padma Shri; UNESCO Award; National Master Weaver Award; Cheongju International Craft Biennale Award; Shilpa Guru Award
- Website: Official web site

Gajam Govardhana is an Indian master weaver, known for his work in Ikkat dyeing in the Telia Rumal tradition, and for his handloom creations. In 2011 the government of India honoured him with the fourth-highest civilian award, Padma Shri.

== Biography ==
Govardhana was born on 1 September 1949 in the small village of Putapakka in the Nalgonda district of the south Indian state of Telangana, part of the former Andhra Pradesh. He heads the Padmashali family, which keeps the Telia Rumal tradition alive, and employs 500 weavers in the state. He runs Murali Sari Emporium, a favoured shopping place for celebrities such as Sonia Gandhi, Shabana Azmi and Sheila Dikshit.

Govardhana has written several articles and publications and received many awards, including a UNESCO Award of Excellence (2002), National Master Weaver Award (2006), Cheongju International Craft Biennale award, and the Shilpa Guru Award (2007). The Government of India recognised his services to the art of weaving when he was included in the 2011 Republic Day honours.

== See also ==
- Ikat
- Telia Rumal
