= Khandua =

Traditional wedding dress from Odisha, India

Khandua (Also Maniabandi or Kataki) is a traditional "bandha" or ikat sari produced from Odisha worn by women during wedding and a special type of which is worn by Jagannath. The clothes contain texts of Gita Govinda on them. Kenduli Khandua, a special form of Khandua of 12 ft and 2 kani (each kani measures the length of a hand) is offered to Jagannath to wear as khandua with stanzas and illustration from Gita Govinda.

== Etymology ==
The word Khandua in Odia translates to the cloth worn in the lower half of the body. Traditionally Kentuli Khandua is offered to Jagannath as lower cloth. Due to the place of origin, Maniabandha of Cuttack district, the other two names Kataki and Maniabandhi are originated.

== History ==
Weaver communities of Maniabandha and Nuapatana of Cuttack traditionally weave this kind of pata. During the rule of Gajapatis, sarees are made and transported to Jagannath Temple. Nilakantha Deva, the king of Badakhemundi was offered khandua sari made up of one piece of khandua silk called caukandika.

== Color and Design ==
Khandua is traditionally red or orange in color. The red color is prepared naturally from the shorea robusta (sal tree). The design motif has an auspicious elephant that represents Buddha surrounded by trailing vine with peacocks in it, a large many petaled flower, a unique Orissan animal called Nabagunjara, a deula kumbha. The elephant in Khandua ikat from Nuapatana usually varies from elephant motives in ikat from Sambalpuri sari as well as ikat from other parts of Orissa. Khandua has plain borders in contrary to borders with motifs in case of the other ikat of Orissa.
