= Pasapali sari =

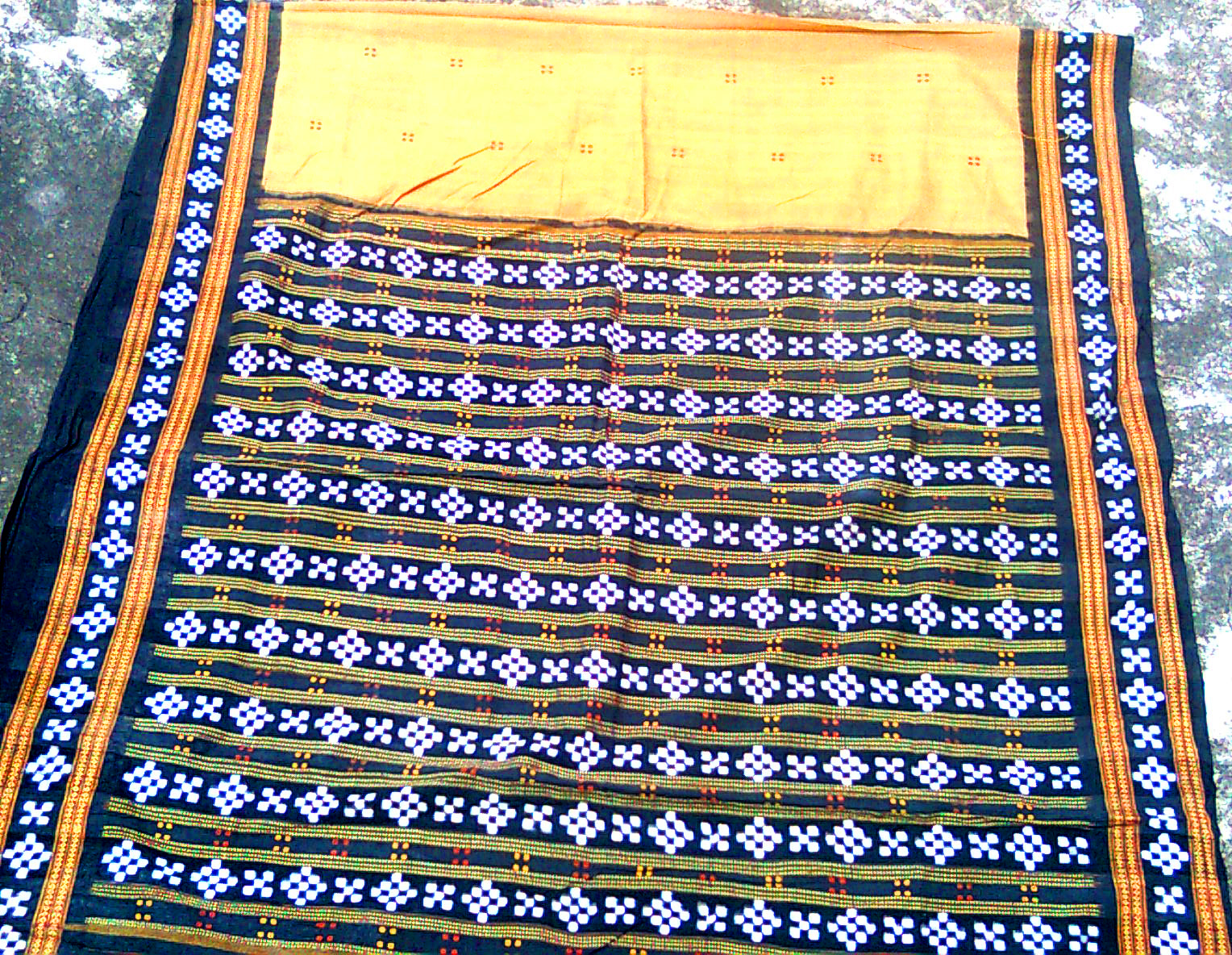
An intricate weave of Pasapali Sari

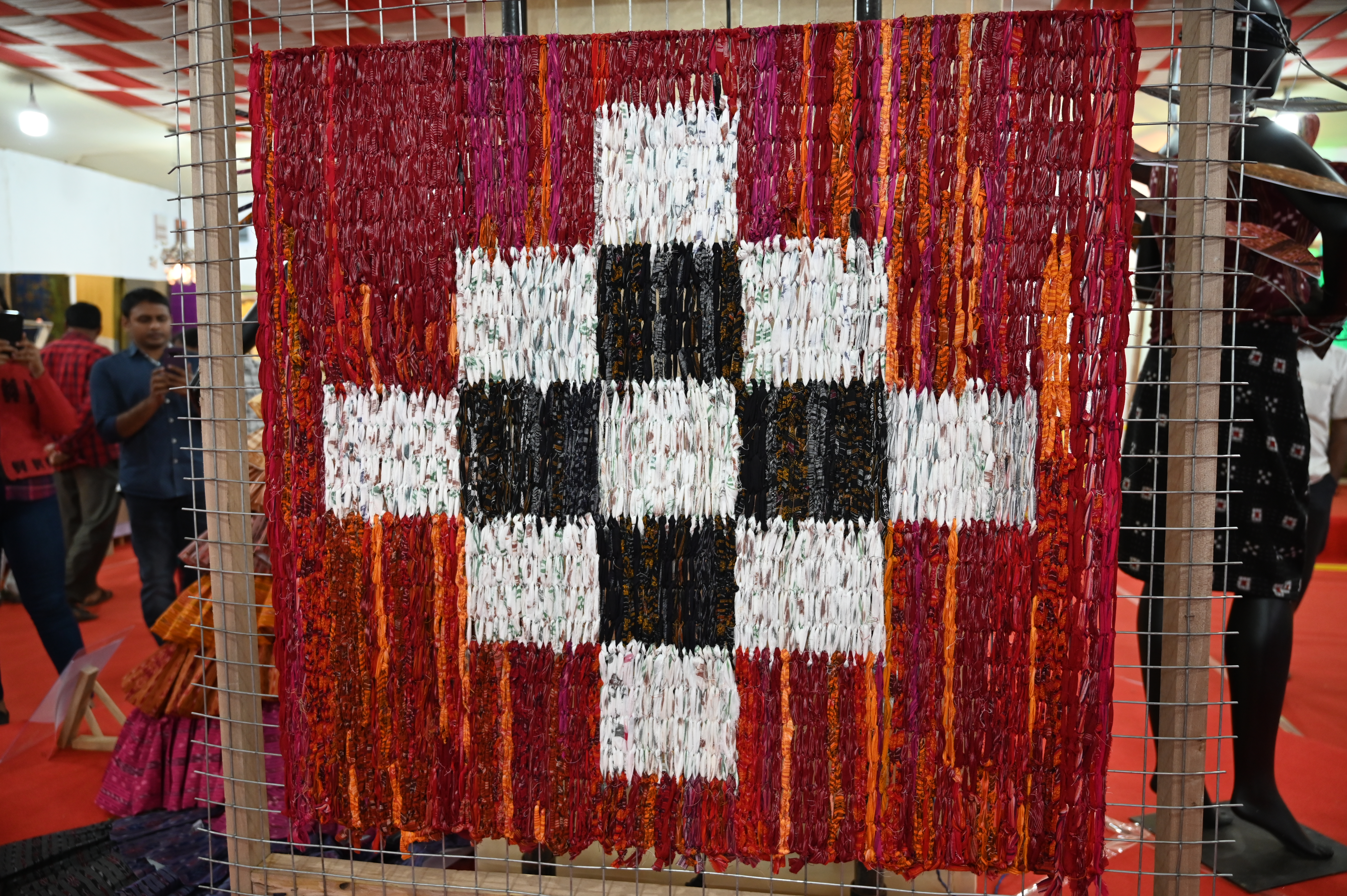
Pasapali motif, made by the technique of knotting by Designer Mr. Binoy Munda & Mr. Vikram Kumar

Pasapali sari also known as Saktapar is a Bandha (Ikat) handloom sari weaved mainly in the Bargarh district of Odisha, India. The name Pasapali is derived from pasā or gambling games using Chess board. These saris have intricate check patterns of contrast colors resembling the chess boards which gives it such name.
