= Remunda =

- Village
- Location in Orissa, India
- Coordinates: 21.26°N 83.75°E
- Country: India
- State: Odisha
- District: Bargarh
- Elevation: 45 m (148 ft)

Population (2011)
  - Total: 6,648

Languages
  - Official: Odia
- Time zone: UTC+5:30 (IST)
- PIN: 768103
- Vehicle registration: OD17

Remunda (anglicised Rae/moon/da/) is a village situated in Bargarh district, around 30 km away from Bargarh city in Odisha state in India. It has a population of 6,648 people (2011). This village is mainly a farmers' village. Remunda is home to one of the largest cooperative farming society. Dusehara Puja is the celebrated along with nuakhai as main festivals.

Odisha State is located on the eastern coast of India between Kolkata (Calcutta) and Chennai (Madras). The State of Odisha is like a bridge between the northern and southern halves of India, representing multifaceted synthesis. In Bargarh district, the Dhanu Yatra festival takes place every year around the last week of December or the first week of January.

== Geography and climate ==
Remunda is situated at 21° 16' North Latitude 83° 45' Longitude and at an altitude of 45 m (148 ft) above sea level.

The village has a tropical climate, specifically a tropical wet and dry climate. The average temperatures range between a minimum of around 10 °C in the winter to a maximum of 40 °C to 45 °C in summer. Sudden afternoon thunderstorms are common in April and May. The south-west monsoons occur in June. The average annual rainfall is 154 cm, most of which is recorded between June and October.

== Cuisine ==
Staple foods of local people are rice and vegetables. The traditional Odia meal is generally spicy with a lot of vegetables. Special delicacies include fish, prawn and crab in non-veg and dalma (a mix of vegetables and pulses) and sag (leaf vegetables). Typical sweets local to remunda is jaau(rice pudding prepared with rice, jaggery and spices), chhenagaja, arisa pitha, Manda pitha, lastalia mitha. Typical sweetmeats include Chhenapoda, Chhenajhilli, Rasabali (all made of milk) and Pitha (cakes). Mahaprasad, the food of the Gods cooked by unique steaming process, is available at temples. Green coconut water, a refreshing natural drink, is widely available. Indian, Chinese and Continental food available in Hotels and Restaurants.

== Health ==
In case of emergency, modern allopathic, ayurvedic and homoeopathic medical care is available at Government Hospitals as well as private clinic / hospitals at remunda.
