= Bhoodan Pochampally =

- Census Town
- Location in Telangana, India Bhoodan Pochampally (India)
- Coordinates: 17.3461°N 78.8122°E
- Country: India
- State: Telangana
- District: Bhuvanagiri

Area
  - Total: 28.42 km^{2} (10.97 sq mi)
- Elevation: 1,184 m (3,885 ft)

Population (2011)
  - Total: 12,972
  - Density: 456.4/km^{2} (1,182/sq mi)

Languages
  - Official: Telugu
- Time zone: UTC+5:30 (IST)
- Postal PIN Code: 508284
- Area code: +91 8685
- Vehicle registration: TS 30
- Website: telangana.gov.in

Bhoodan Pochampally is a census town in the Yadadri Bhuvanagiri district of the Indian state of Telangana. It is located in Pochampalle mandal of Bhongir division. This village is Known for woven products, especially hand-woven Ikkat sarees. There are thousands of looms in the village that produce large quantities of sarees. In 2004, Pochampalli saree also received a geographical indication (GI) tag. This village was one of the three nominated under the category of best tourism villages by the United Nations World Tourism Organization.

== History ==
Pochampally highlighted on Nalgonda Map.

On 18 April 1951, the historic day of the very genesis of the Bhoodan movement, Vinoba Bhave entered the Pochampally Mandal in Nalgonda district, the center of Communist activity. The organizers had arranged Vinoba's stay at Pochampally, a large village with about 700 families, of whom two-third were landless. Pochampally villagers gave Vinoba a warm welcome. By early afternoon villagers began to gather around Vinoba at Vinoba's cottage. The villagers asked for eighty acres of land, forty wet, forty dry for forty families that would be enough. Then Vinoba asked," If it is not possible to get land from the government, is there not something villagers themselves could do?" To everyone's surprise, Shri Gopal Rao Pochampalli garu got up and said in a rather excited voice: "I will give you 1000 acres. This incident which is neither planned nor imagined was the very genesis of the Bhoodan movement and it made Vinoba think that there in lay the potentiality of solving the land problem of India. This movement later on developed into a village gift or Gramdan movement. As the huge, massive and magnificent movement called Bhoodan Movement was born in this Pochampally, the village was renamed to Bhoodan Pochampally.

In 1999, the weaving industry of Bhoodan Pochampally came to limelight when a young weaver Chithakindhi Mallesham developed a machine for automating the time-consuming, laborious and painful Asu process of winding of yarn before the dyeing and weaving is done. The innovation was recognized by National Innovation Foundation – India.

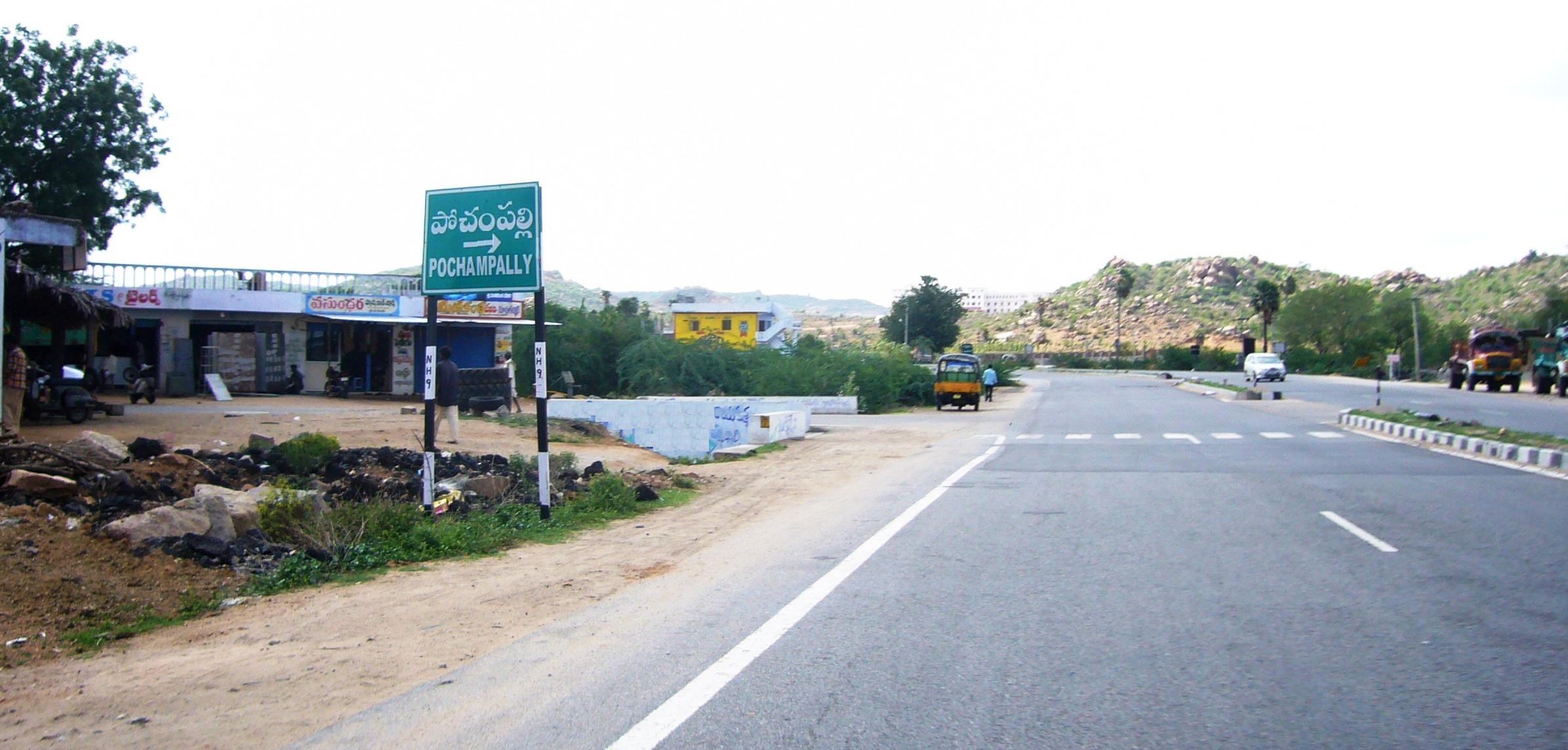
Way to Pochampally

== See also ==
- Pochampally Saree
- Bhoodan Movement
