= Patola sari =

Sari of double-ikat woven silk

A Patola sari is a double ikat woven sari, usually made from silk, made in Patan, Gujarat, India. The word patola is the plural form; the singular is patolu. These saris are made using silk threads that are first dyed with natural colors and then woven together to create the intricate patterns and designs. They are usually worn for special occasions, such as weddings and formal events.

== The weave ==
To create a patola sari, both the warp and weft threads are wrapped to resist the dye according to the desired pattern of the final woven fabric. This tying is repeated for each colour that is to be included in the finished cloth. The technique of dyeing the warp and weft before weaving is called double ikat. The bundles of thread are strategically knotted before dyeing.

== History ==
Silk weavers of the Salvi caste from the state of Maharashtra chose Gujarat as the home for their renowned patola fabric. It is believed that salvis went to Gujarat in the 12th century with the intention of acquiring the patronage of the Chaulukyas Rajputs, who ruled all of Gujarat and parts of Malva and south Rajasthan at the time, with Anahiwad Patan as the capital. Legend says that over 700 patola weavers came to the palace of Raja Kumarpal, on the personal request of king himself. The Solanki (Chalukya) rulers used to dress in patola silk themselves on special occasions.

It is broadly accepted belief that these Salvis originally belonged to the region, which now lies at the middle of the present day Marathawada and Vidarbha divisions of Maharashtra state. The art of Patola weaving is an ancient one. According to some historians, the art of Patola weaving was known also in the 4th century in “Ajanta” caves, which resembles the tie-dyes technique of patola. Ajanta Caves were patronized by the Vatsagulma branch of the Vakataka dynasty, which controlled a vast area of Deccan during the 3rd, 4th & 5th centuries A.D. Vatsagulma is presently the 'Washim' district of the Vidarbha Division of Maharashtra.

After the decline of Solanki empire, salvis founded a rich trade in Gujarat. Patola saris quickly became a sign of social status among Gujarati women and girls, especially as part of stridhan, items that a woman can claim as her. These art of patan is more than 850 years old.

Patola has had a huge importance as status clothes in Southeast Asia where it was imported from at least the Middle Ages. Local elites in far eastern locations such as Timor and Maluku Islands strove to acquire patola or patola imitations, which were often provided by European merchants in the early-modern era. Patola motifs were frequently taken over by indigenous weaving traditions.

== Design and pattern ==
There are four distinct patterns which are woven primarily in Gujarat by the Salvi community. In Jain and Hindu communities, double ikat saris with entire designs of parrots, flowers, elephant and dancing figures are generally used. In Muslim communities, saris with geometric designs and flower patterns are typical, being worn mostly for weddings and other special occasions. Maharashtrian Brahmins wear saris woven with plain, dark coloured borders and body and a bird design called Nari Kunj.

== Types of Patola Saree ==
- Single Ikat Patola – A Patola weaving style in which either the warp or weft threads are resist-dyed before weaving to create traditional patterns.
- Semi Ikat Patola – A simplified variation inspired by traditional ikat weaving that combines handcrafted aesthetics with relatively less complex weaving techniques.
- Double Ikat Patola – The most intricate form of Patola weaving in which both warp and weft threads are resist-dyed before weaving and precisely aligned to form detailed patterns.
- Ikat Weaving – A traditional resist-dyeing textile technique in which threads are dyed before weaving to create patterns within the fabric itself.
