= Nuapatna =

- Town
- Location in Odisha, India Nuapatna (India)
- Coordinates: 20.449171°N 85.464492°E
- Country: India
- State: Odisha
- District: Cuttack

Population (2013)
  - Total: 15,000

Languages
  - Official: Oriya
- Time zone: UTC+5:30 (IST)
- Postal code: 754035
- Vehicle registration: OD
- Website: khanduapata.com

Nuapatna is a census town in Cuttack district in the Indian state of Odisha. The whole area is rich in cultural and commercial importance.

== Demographics ==
As of 2001 India census, Nuapatna had a population of 7846. Males constitute 52% of the population and females 48%. Nuapatna has an average literacy rate of 65%, higher than the national average of 59.5%: male literacy is 75%, and female literacy is 55%. In Nuapatna, 14% of the population is under 6 years of age.

Below are some pictures of hand-loom machine which is used to prepare khandua, Jala, Bomkai sarees

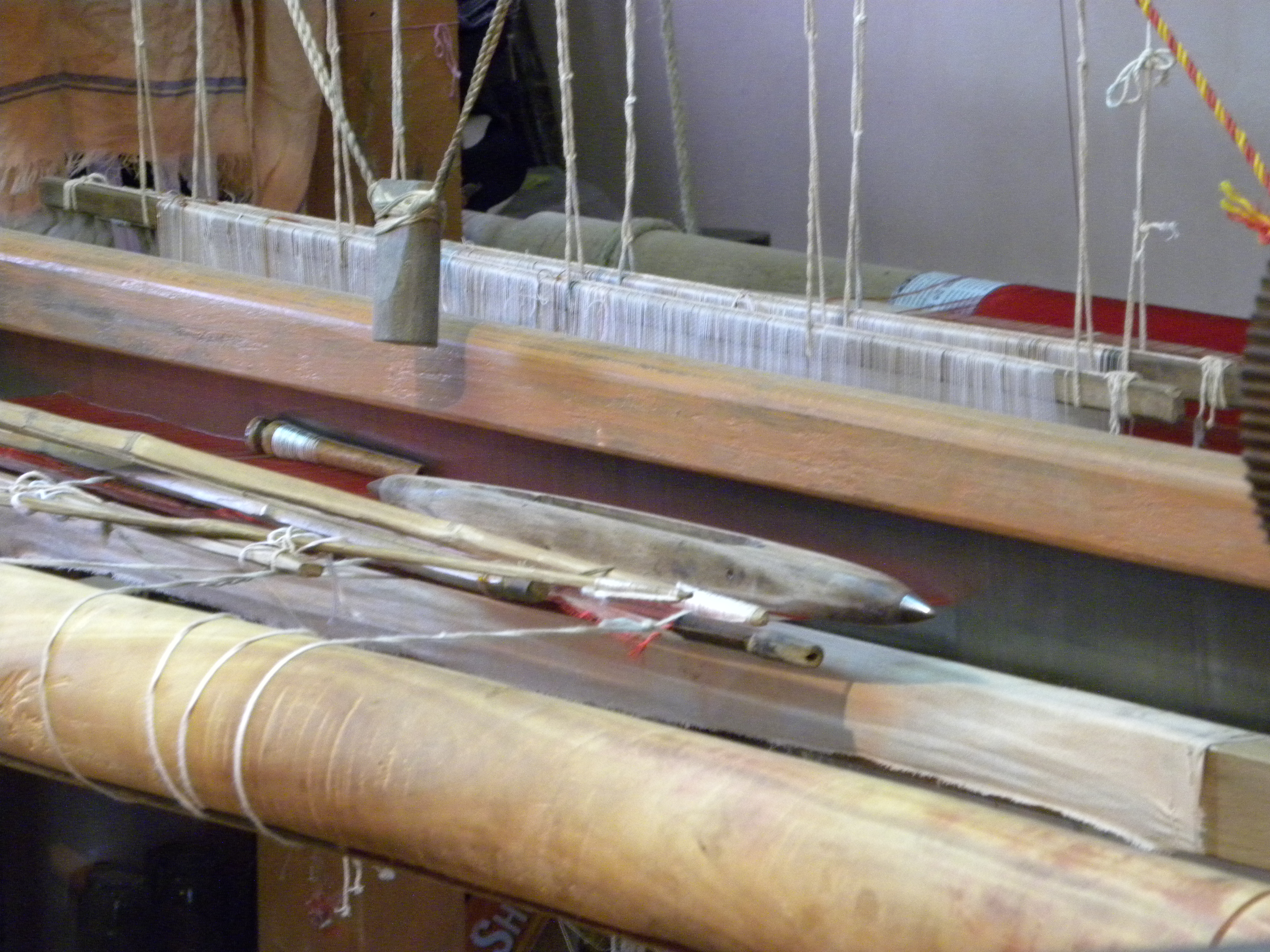
Waving shuttle

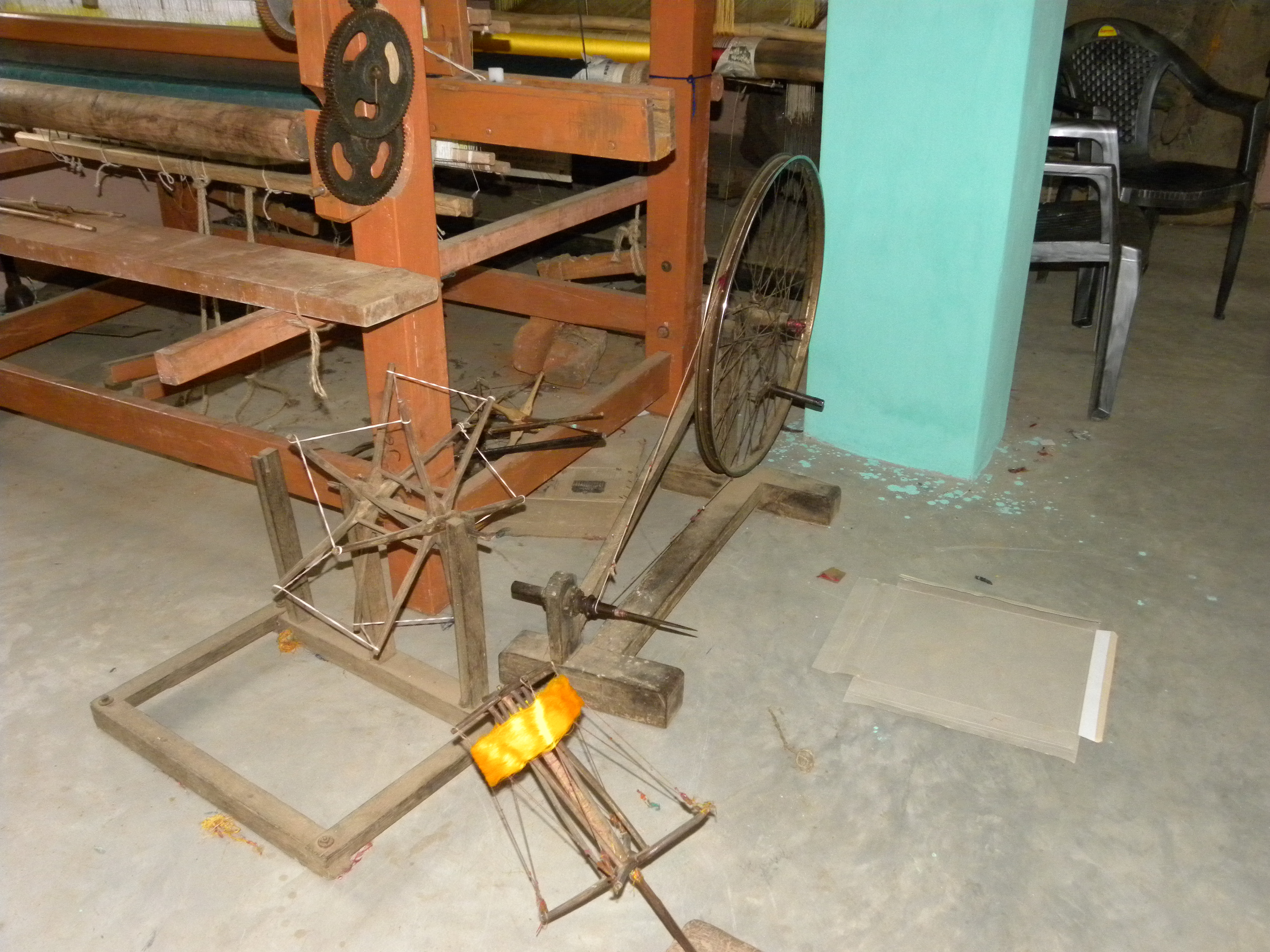
charkha

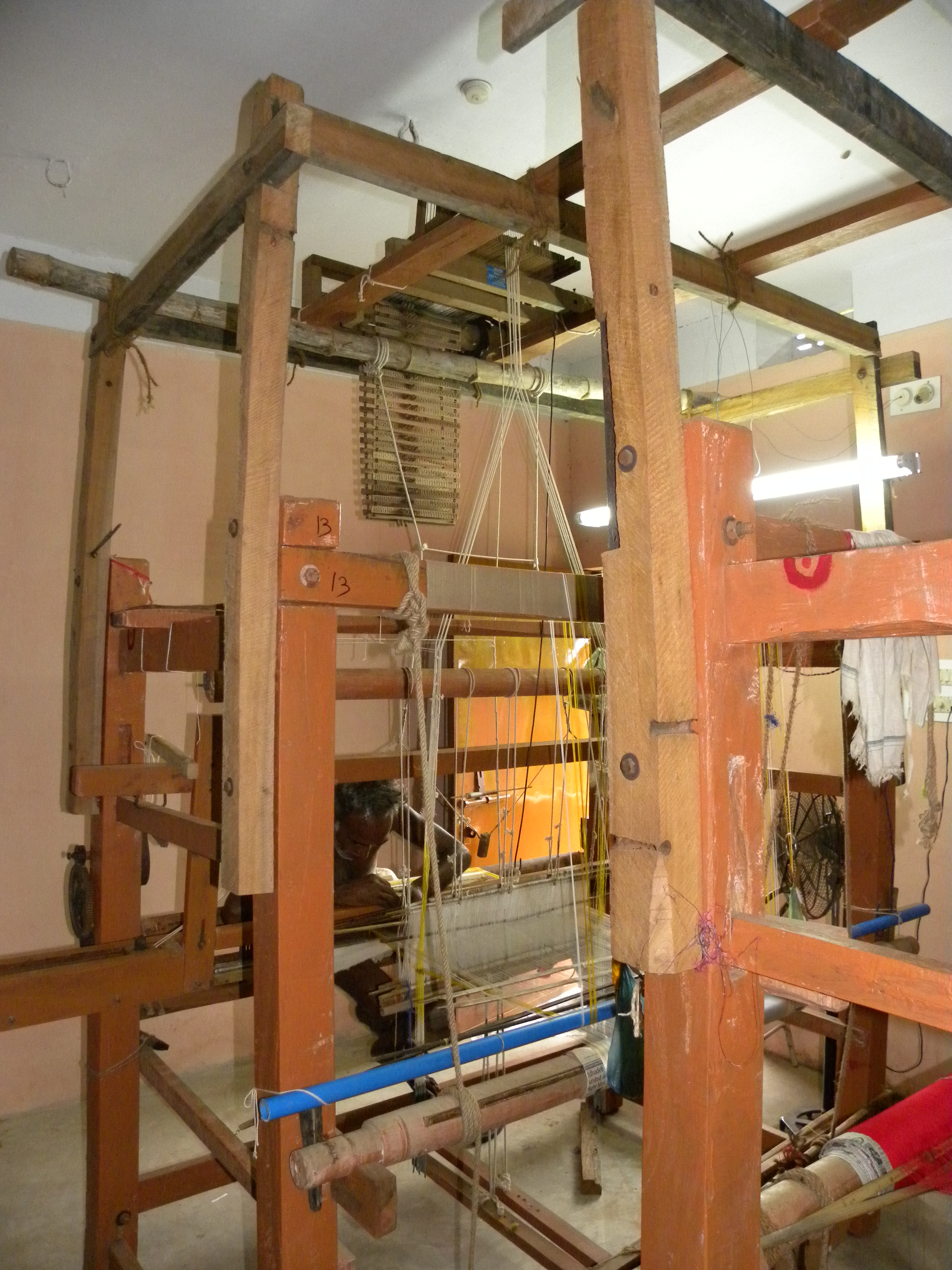
Handloom

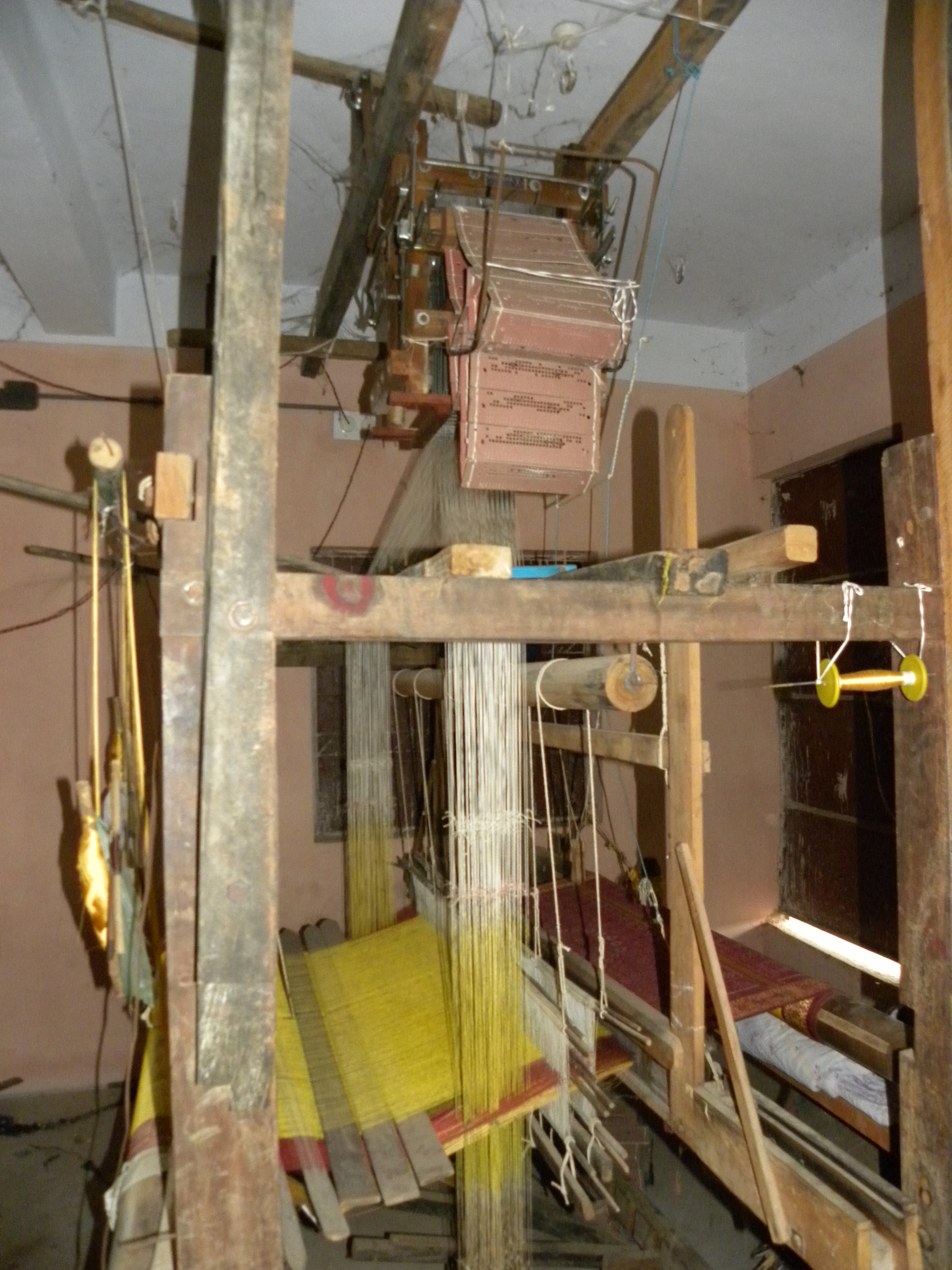
Handloom

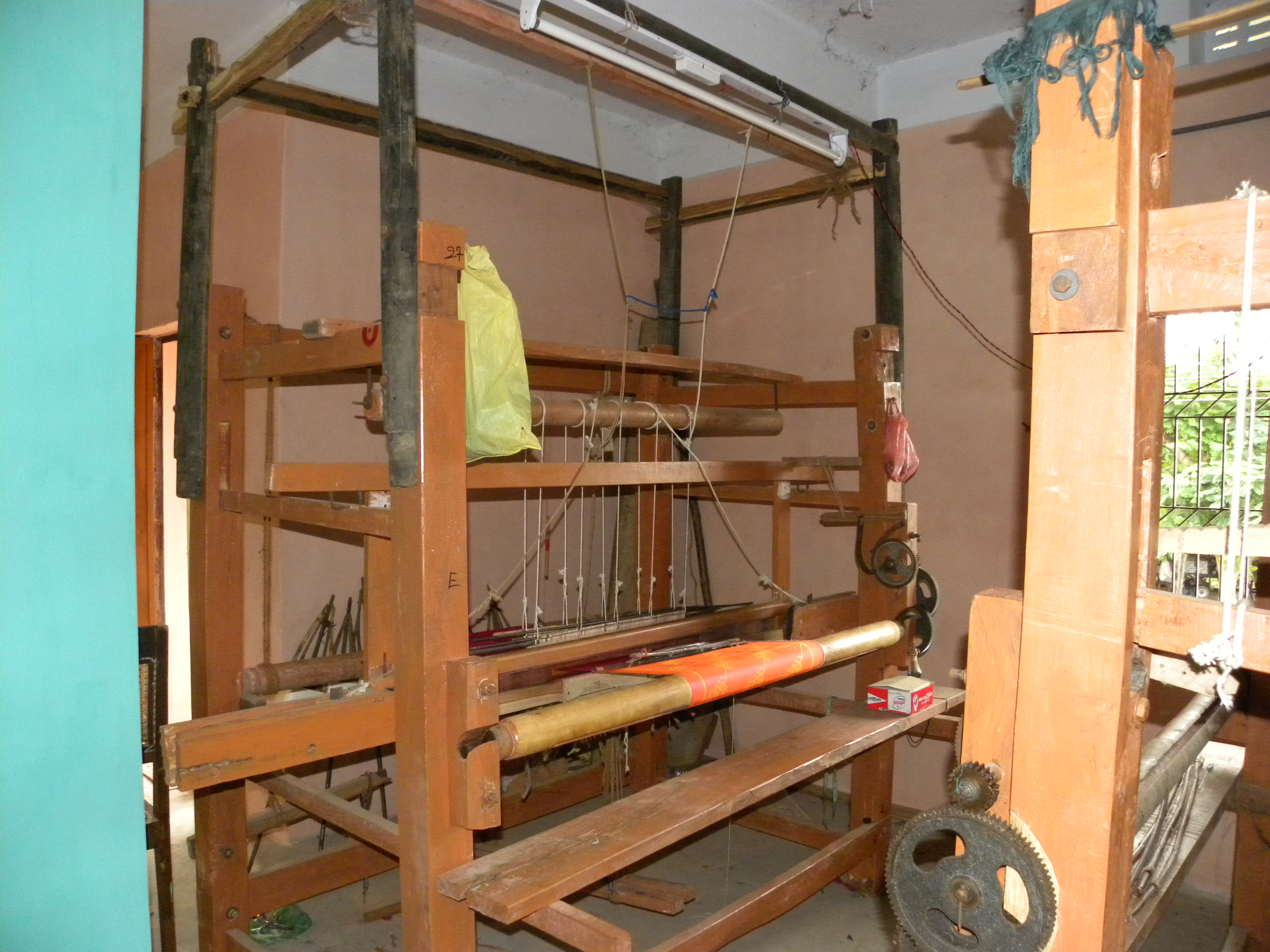
Handloom

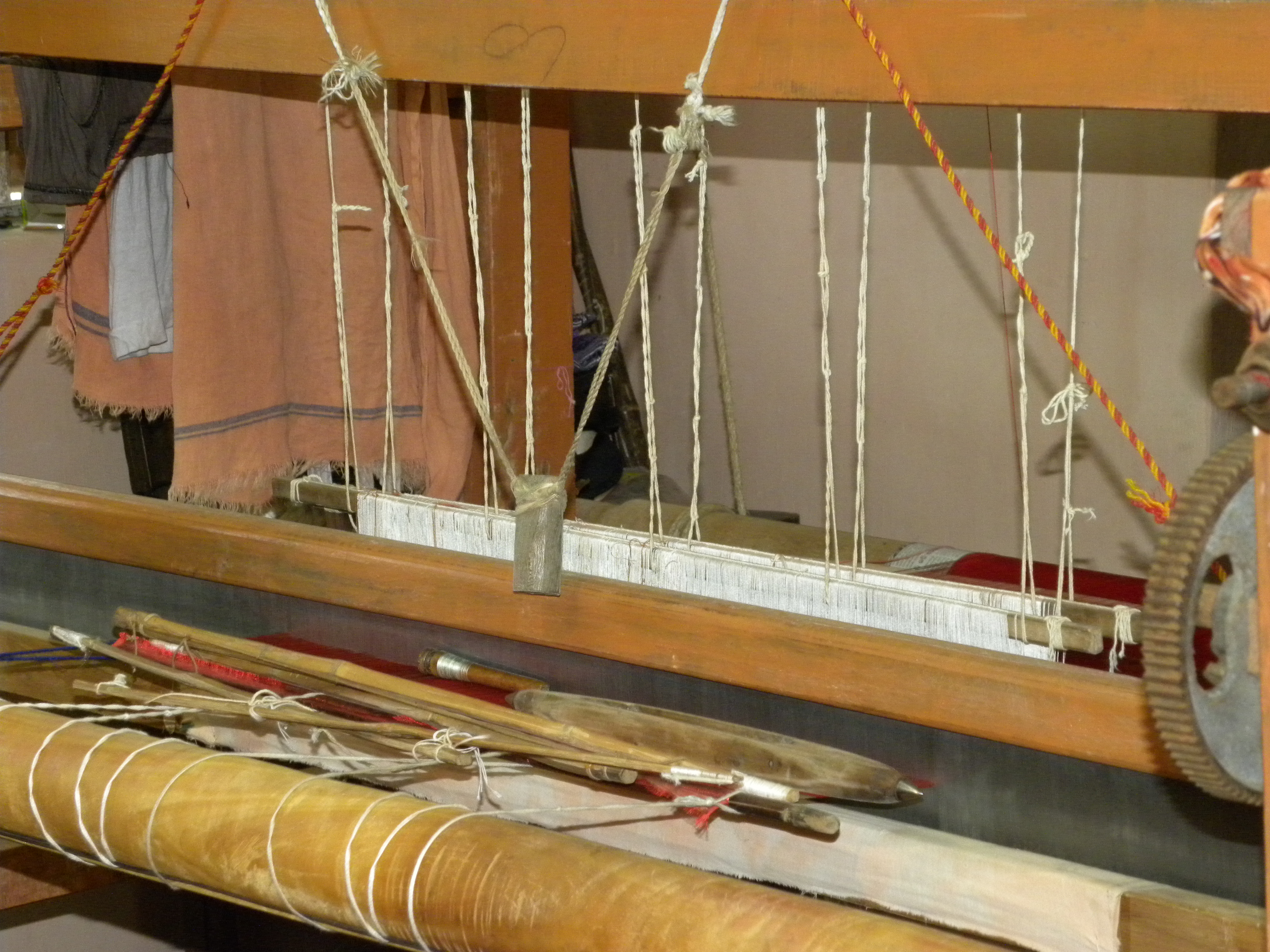
Handloom

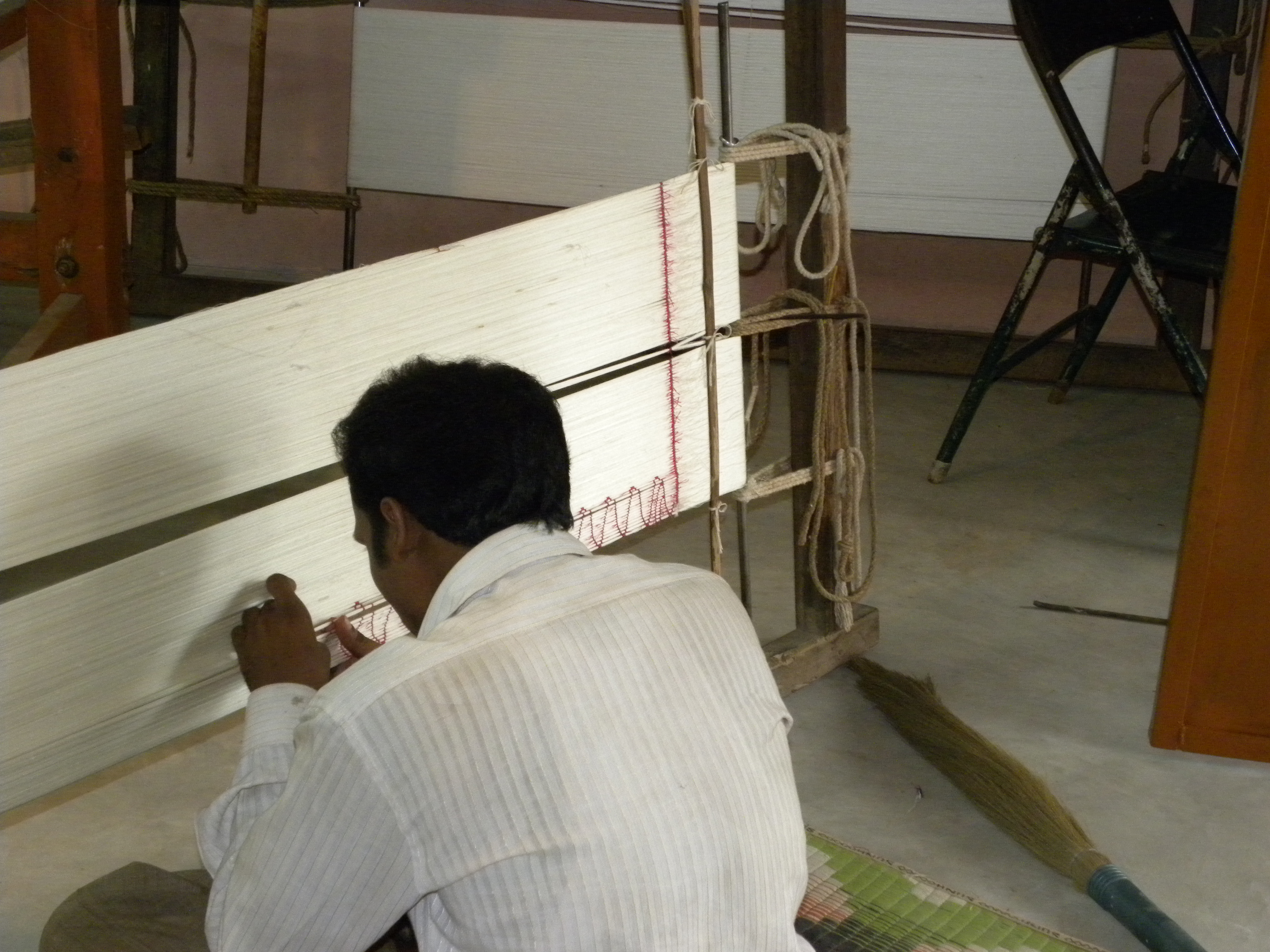
weaving thread designing

== Places of interest ==
- Whole village is Famous for handloom and textiles
- Budha Temple [Budhajayantipur]
- Kalapata Mandir
- Mahadev Mandir
- college Pahada
- Jamuna
- J.spin campus
- Mahatma gandhi park
- Patita pabana mandir
- Ram mandir
- Bhagabata Pahad (mundia)
- Panthei Nala
- Chandan Pokhari
- Puruna Pokhari
- A.S High School
- Bada pokhari
- chandi chaka
- Gyana mandir
- Subhadra saree centre
- Kapileswar Temple
- Santosh handloom
- Dullali Devi girls high
- JEMADEIPUR HIGH SCHOOL

== Festivals ==
- Durga Puja
- Chandan Yatra
- Ganesh Puja
- Khanda Pata
- Kartika purnima
- Ratha Yatra (Cart festival)
- Rama nabami
- Dolo purnima
- Shiba Bibhaha
- Diwali
- Chandan yatra(majisahi &badasahi)
- rasa purnami
