= Pochampally sari =

Saree from Telangana State, India

Pochampalli Saree
- Geographical indication
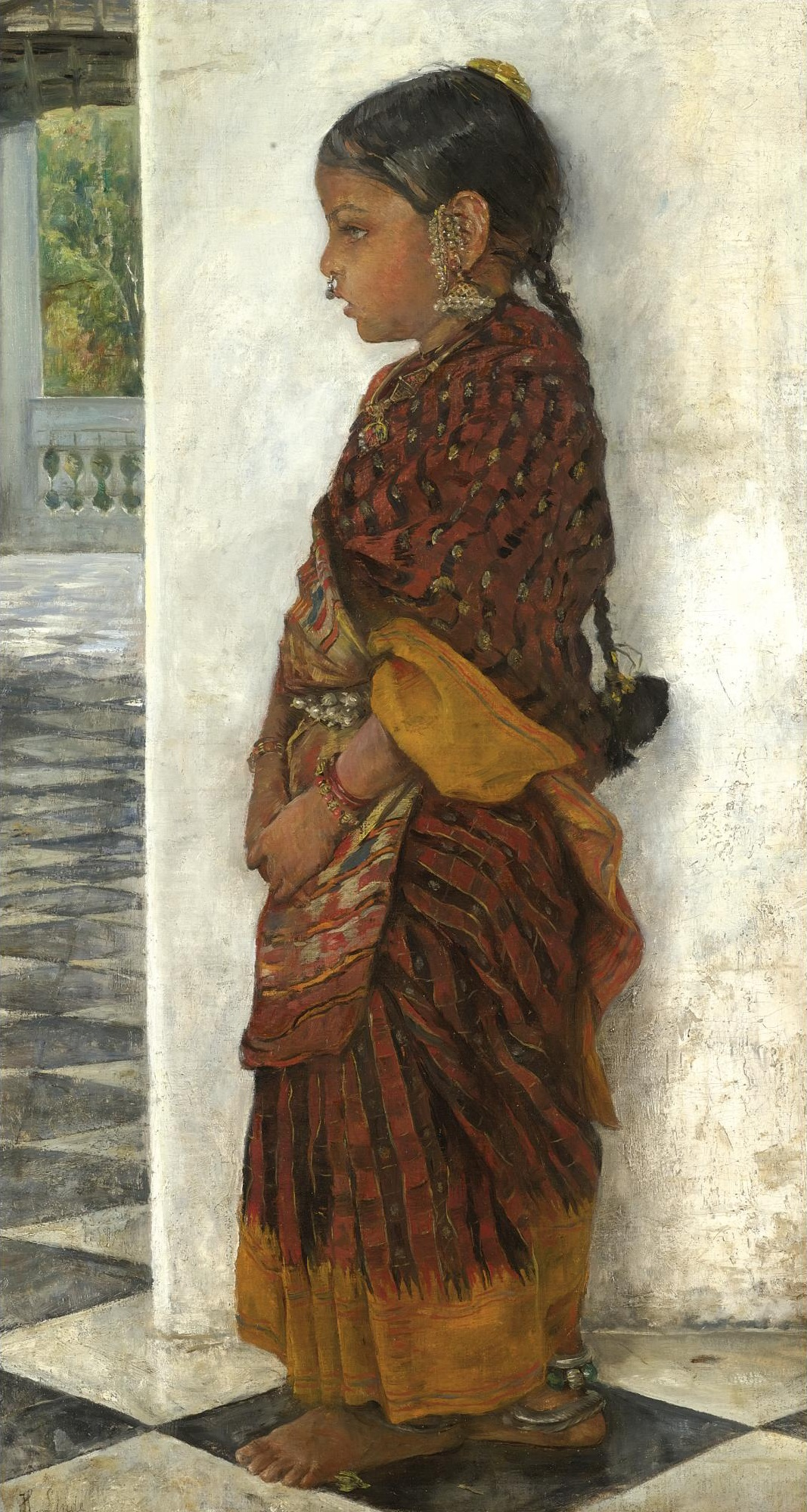
- Girl standing in a veranda wearing a Pochampally saree, 1895, by Hermann Linde
- Description: Saree made in Bhoodan Pochampally
- Type: Saree
- Area: Bhoodan Pochampally, Yadadri Bhuvanagiri district, Telangana
- Country: India
- Registered: 2005
- Material: Silk or Cotton

Pochampally sari or Pochampalli ikat is a saree made in Bhoodan Pochampally, Yadadri Bhuvanagiri district, Telangana State, India. They have traditional geometric patterns in "Paagadu Bandhu" (Ikat) style of dyeing. The intricate geometric designs find their way into sarees and dress materials. The Indian government's official airline, Air India, has its cabin crew wear specially designed Pochampally silk sarees.

== History ==
Telangana is one of the ancient Ikat weaving centers in India, along with Gujarat and neighboring Odisha. The weaving centers during ancient period was in Chirala and Jentrpeta towns situated between Vijayawada and Chennai but was discontinued for various reasons. Locally, Pochampally Ikat is known as Paagadu Bandhu and Chitki in Telangana where it is produced, in other parts of India it is popularly known as Pochampally, named after one of the villages where it is produced. It has its own unique character of design, different from other Ikat producing areas in India. Today, most of weaving takes place in Pochampally village where there are over five thousand looms producing this textile. It has found place in UNESCO tentative list of world heritage sites as part of "iconic saree weaving clusters of India". The kerchiefs made of silk thread are known as "Teli Rumals"

== Weave ==
The weaving survives in a few villages like Pochampally, Koyalgudam, Choutuppala, Siripuram, Bhuvanagiri, Puttapaka and Gattuppala and few villages around them mostly in Nalgonda district. Pochampally Ikat uniqueness lies in the transfer of intricate design and colouring onto warp and weft threads first and then weave them together globally known as double ikat textiles. The fabric is cotton, silk and sico – a mix of silk and cotton. Increasingly, the colours themselves are from natural sources and their blends.

== Industry ==
Pochampally, a cluster of 80 villages, has traditional looms, whose pattern and designs are centuries-old. Today this Silk City, which is more of a cottage industry, is home to more than 10,000 weaving families in 100 villages. The fabric is marketed through the cooperative society, many other linked organizations, the master weavers and the business houses in Pochampally. Pochampally does more than Rs.10,00,000,00 annual business in terms of yarn sales, purchase of handloom products and sales. The government in 2010 divided the belt into two clusters Pochampally 1 and Pochampally 2, and is proving common weaving centres. Because of its unique design, efforts are on to revive the dying art.

== Geographical indication rights ==
Pochampally saree received Intellectual Property Rights Protection or Geographical Indication (GI) status in 2005. Pochampally Ikat be the registered property of Pochampally Handloom Weavers Cooperative Society Ltd and the Pochampally Handloom Tie and Dye Silk Sarees Manufacturers Association.

== Recognition ==
UN selects Telangana's Pochampally as one of the world's 'best tourism villages'. Being famous for its eponymous handloom weaved 'Ikat' sarees. The silk city of India is declared as the best villages on the planet by UN. Govt of India has issued a postal ticket of INR 5.00 in the year 2018 in its recognition.

== See also ==
- Ilkal saree
- Molakalmuru Sari
