= Sambalpuri sari =

Type of Sari

Coordinates: 21.515076°N 83.916572°E

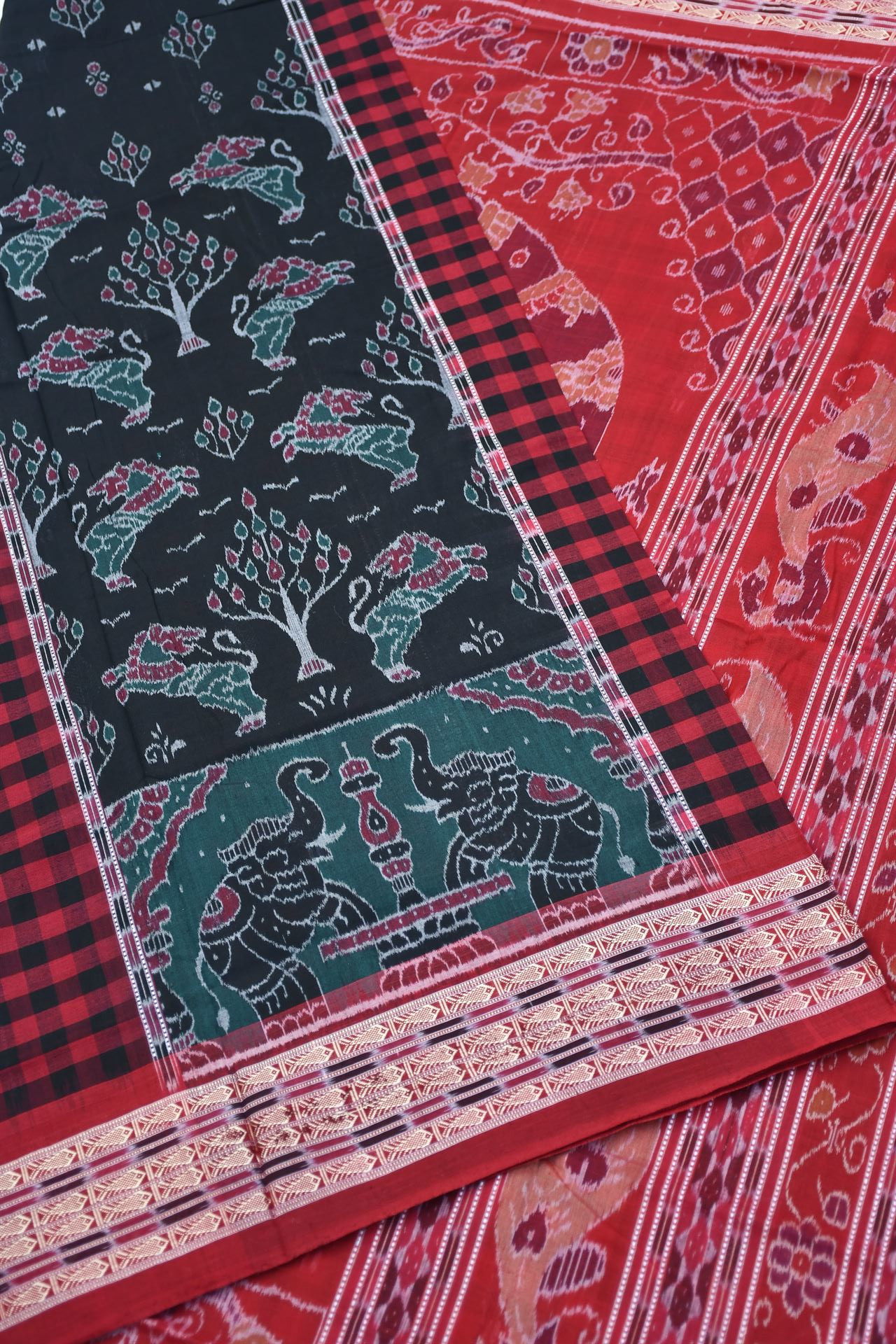
An intricate bandha (Ikat) weave of Sambalpuri sari

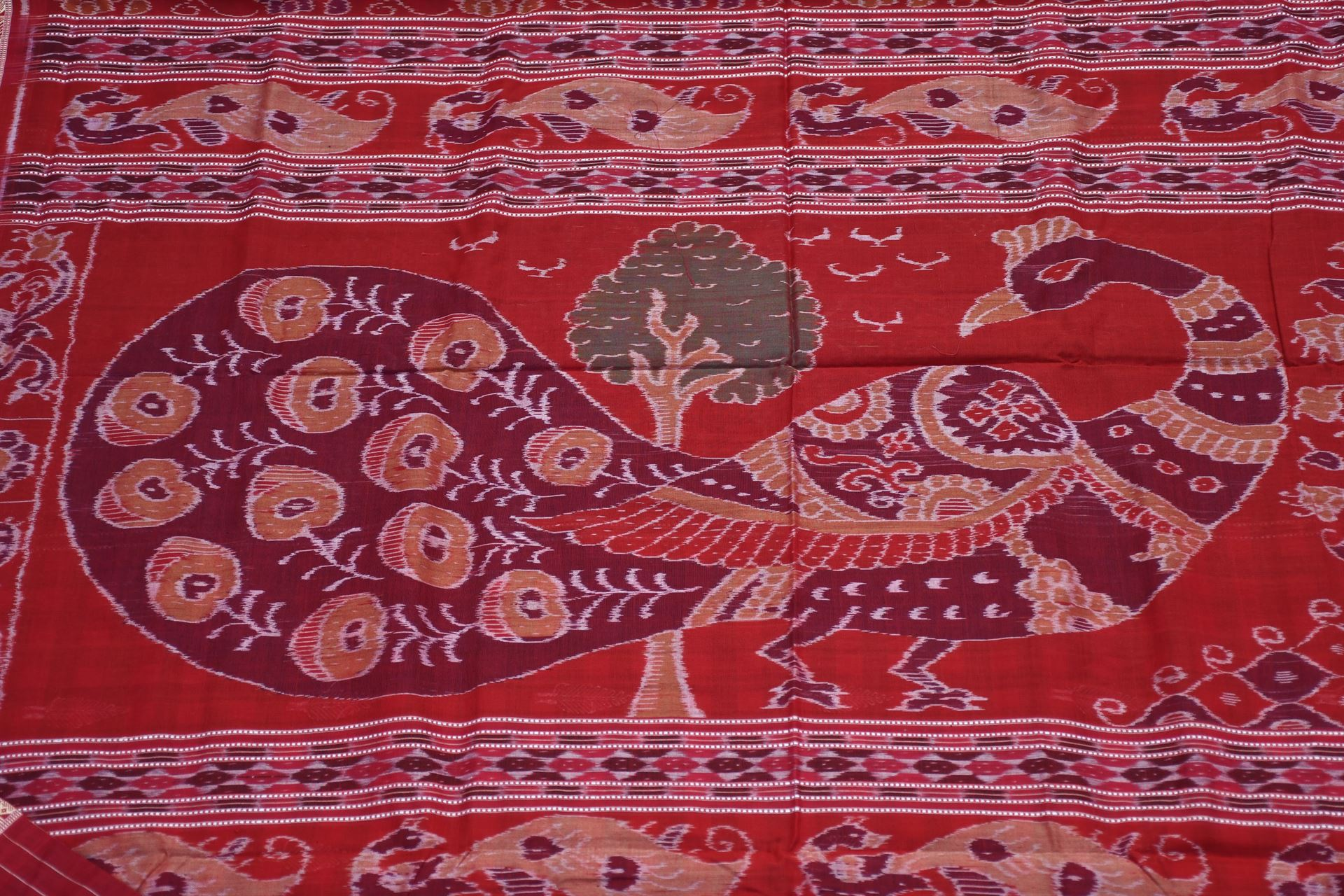
An intricate weave of Sambalpuri sari pallu

A Sambalpuri sari is a traditional handwoven bandha (ikat) sari (locally called "sambalpuri bandha" sadhi or saree) wherein the warp and the weft are tie-dyed before weaving. It is a handloom sari produced in the Sambalpur, Bargarh, Balangir, Boudh and Sonepur districts of Odisha, India. Sambalpuri saris incorporate traditional motifs like shankha (Conch), chakra (wheel), phula (flower), all of which have deep symbolism with the native Odia culture. The colours red, black and white represents Lord Kaalia (Jagannatha)'s face colour.

The sari is a traditional female garment in the Indian subcontinent consisting of a strip of unstitched cloth ranging from four to nine meters in length that is draped over the body in various styles.

These saris first became popular outside the state when the late Prime Minister Indira Gandhi started wearing them. In the 1980s and 1990s they became popular across India. The handloom silk saris manufactured in Sambalpur and Berhampur (Berhampur Patta) in Odisha were included in the Government of India's Geographical Indications (GI) registry to protect the livelihoods of the artisans.

== Variations ==
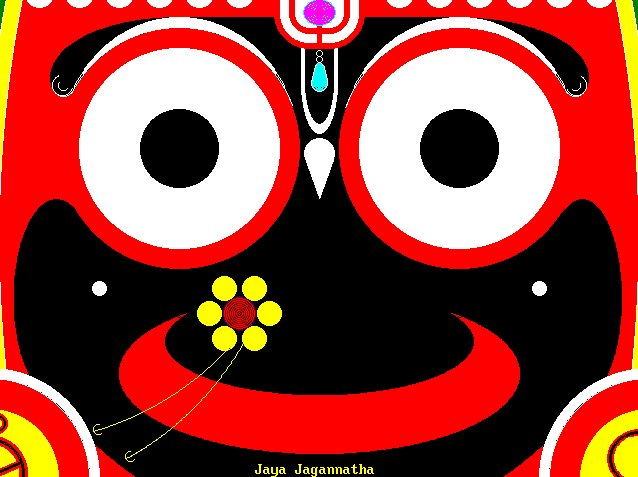
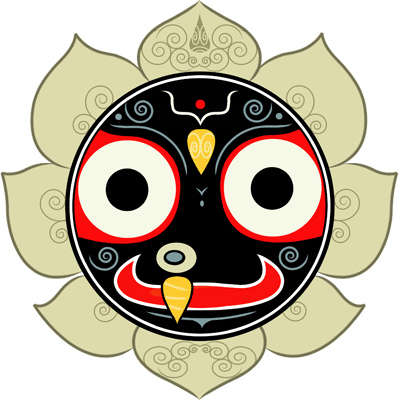
Two versions of Jagannath iconography

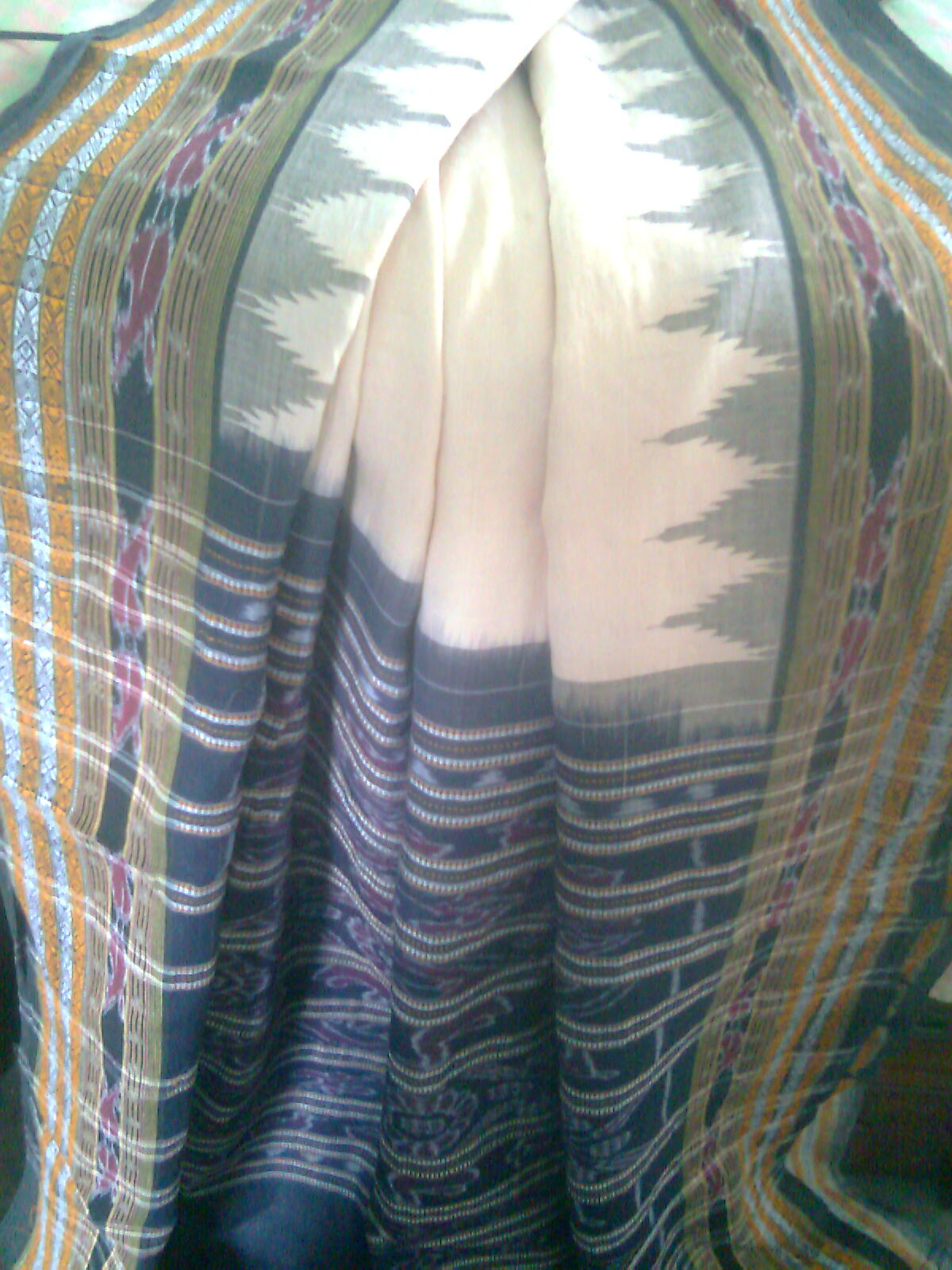
Sambalpuri baandha sari

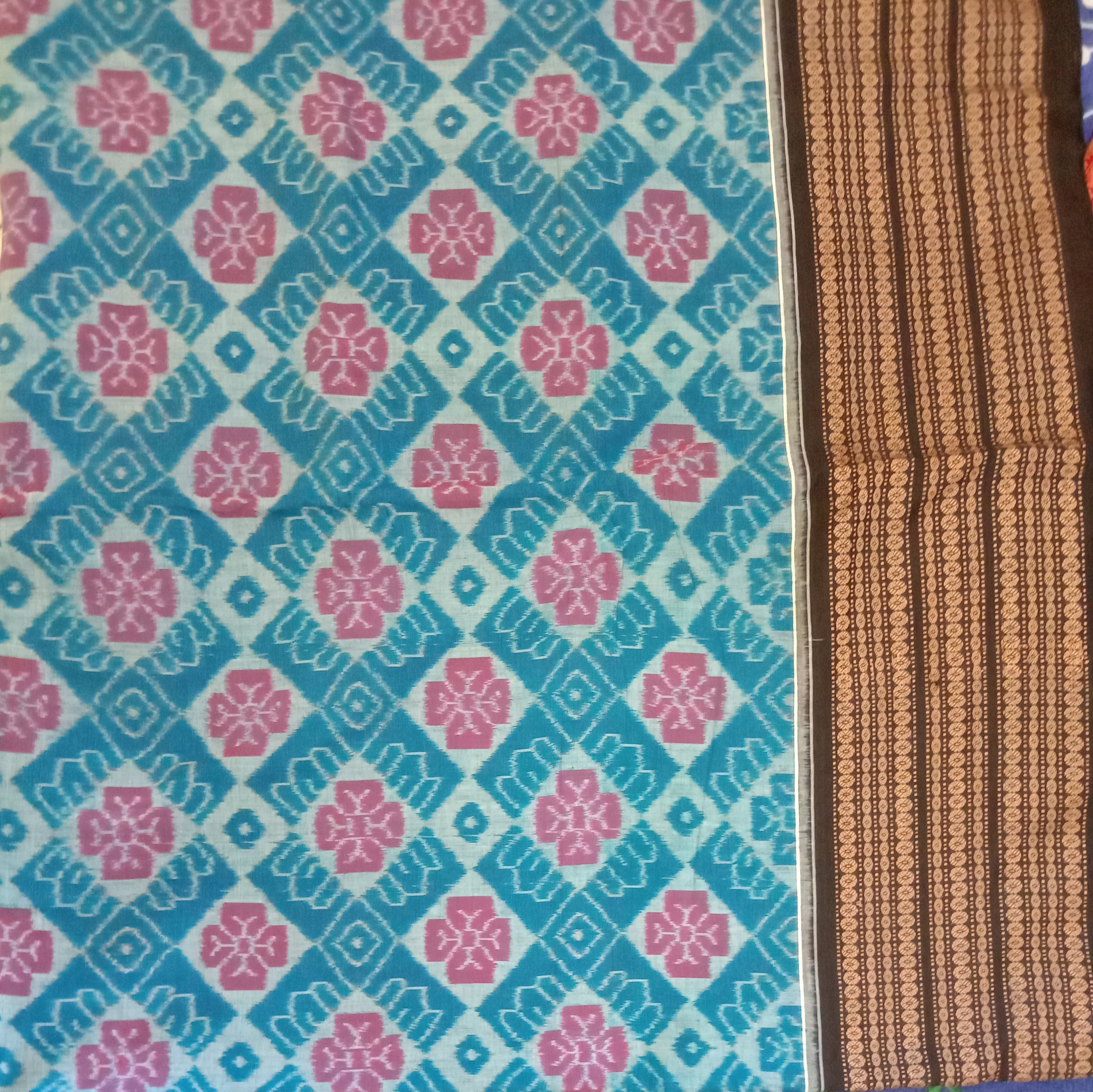
Sambhalpuri Saree

Varieties of the Sambalpuri sari include Sonepuri, Pasapali, Bomkai, Barpali, and Bapta saris, which are in high demand. Most of them have been named after their places of origin and are popularly known as Pata. Paintings on Tussar saris depicting Mathura Vijay, Raslila and Ayodhya Vijay owe their origin to ‘Raghurajpur patta paintings’.

== Fabric and design ==
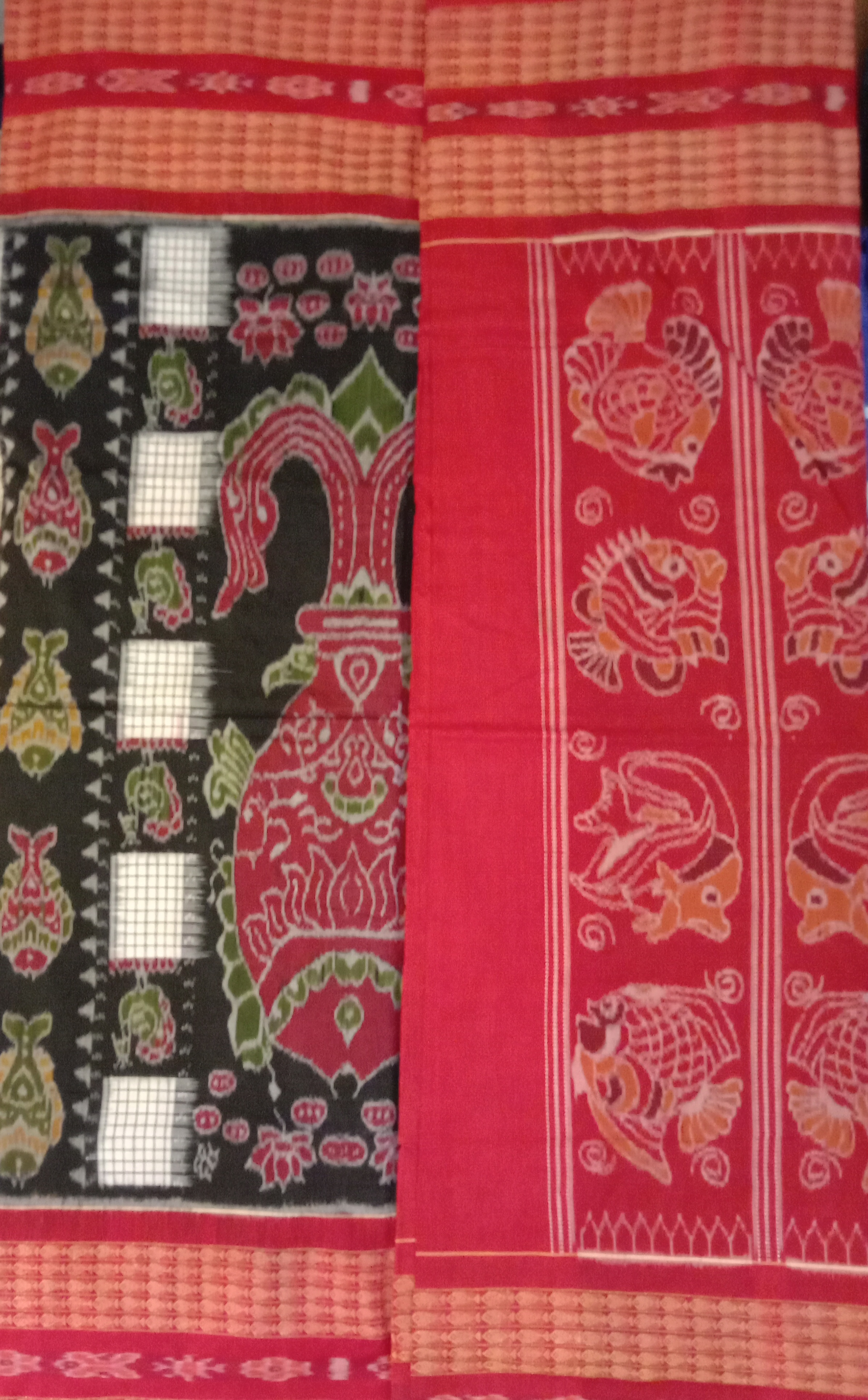
Sambhalpuri Saree (Red)

Baandha fabric is created using a tie-dye technique. The yarns are tied according to the desired patterns to prevent absorption of dyes, and then dyed. The yarns or set of yarns so produced is called 'Baandha'. The unique feature of this form of designing is that the designs are reflected almost identically on both sides of the fabric. Once the fabric is dyed it can never be bleached into another colour.

The salient feature of these saris is the traditional craftsmanship of the 'Bandhakala'- the Tie-dye art reflected in their intricate weaves, also known as Sambalpuri "Ikkat". In this technique, the threads are first tie-dyed and later woven into a fabric, with the entire process taking many weeks.

This versatile technique enables a craftsman to weave colourful designs, patterns and images meant to inspire a thought or conveying a message into a fabric. Traditionally, craftsmen created Baandhas with images of flora or fauna or with geometrical patterns. More recently, new types of Baandha depicting portrait, landscape and flower pods are being designed.

It is believed that this art migrated to Western Odisha along with the Bhulia community who fled Northern India in the year 1192 AD after the fall of the Chouhan empire at the hands of the Mughals. Since then and up to the year 1925 it flourished in Western Odisha in a limited number of designs and in vegetable colours and consisted mostly of saris used by the womenfolk of the Odisha.

== Production ==
Today the Baandha fabric is popularly known by its geographical and cultural name Sambalpuri owing to the pioneering efforts of Sri Radhashyam Meher, who introduced important innovations in handloom weaving and helped improve the skills of local craftsmen and the quality of Sambalpuri textiles. Other master craftsmen who contributed to the development of Sambalpuri textiles included Kailash Chandra Meher, Padma Shri Kunja Bihari Meher, Chaturbhuja Meher and Padma Shri Krutartha Acharya, along with handloom technologist Ramkrishna Meher. Sambalpuri textiles today include furnishing materials, dress materials and saris in silk, cotton and mercerised cotton in a variety of colours and many different designs. Baandha craftsmen are also masters of the 'extra warp' and 'extra weft' style of designing which can be seen in almost all forms of Baandha textiles.

The factory production of Sambalpuri saris has negatively impacted traditional handloom artisans.

== Important handloom clusters of Odisha ==
Serial No.	Category of cluster	Name of district	Name of cluster	Number of clusters
1	A	Bargarh	Attabira, Bargarh, Bheden, Barpali, Bijepur, Padampur, Sohela, Bhatli	8
2	A	Subarnapur/Sonepur	Birmaharajpur, Sonepur, Ulunda, Binika	4
3	A	Boudh	Boudh	1
4	B	Balangir	Patnagarh, Agalpur, Bangamunda	3
5	B	Nuapada	Khariar (Sinapali)	1
6	B	Sambalpur	Rengali	1
