= Penglipuran =

Traditional Balinese village in Indonesia

Coordinates: 8.422°S 115.359°E

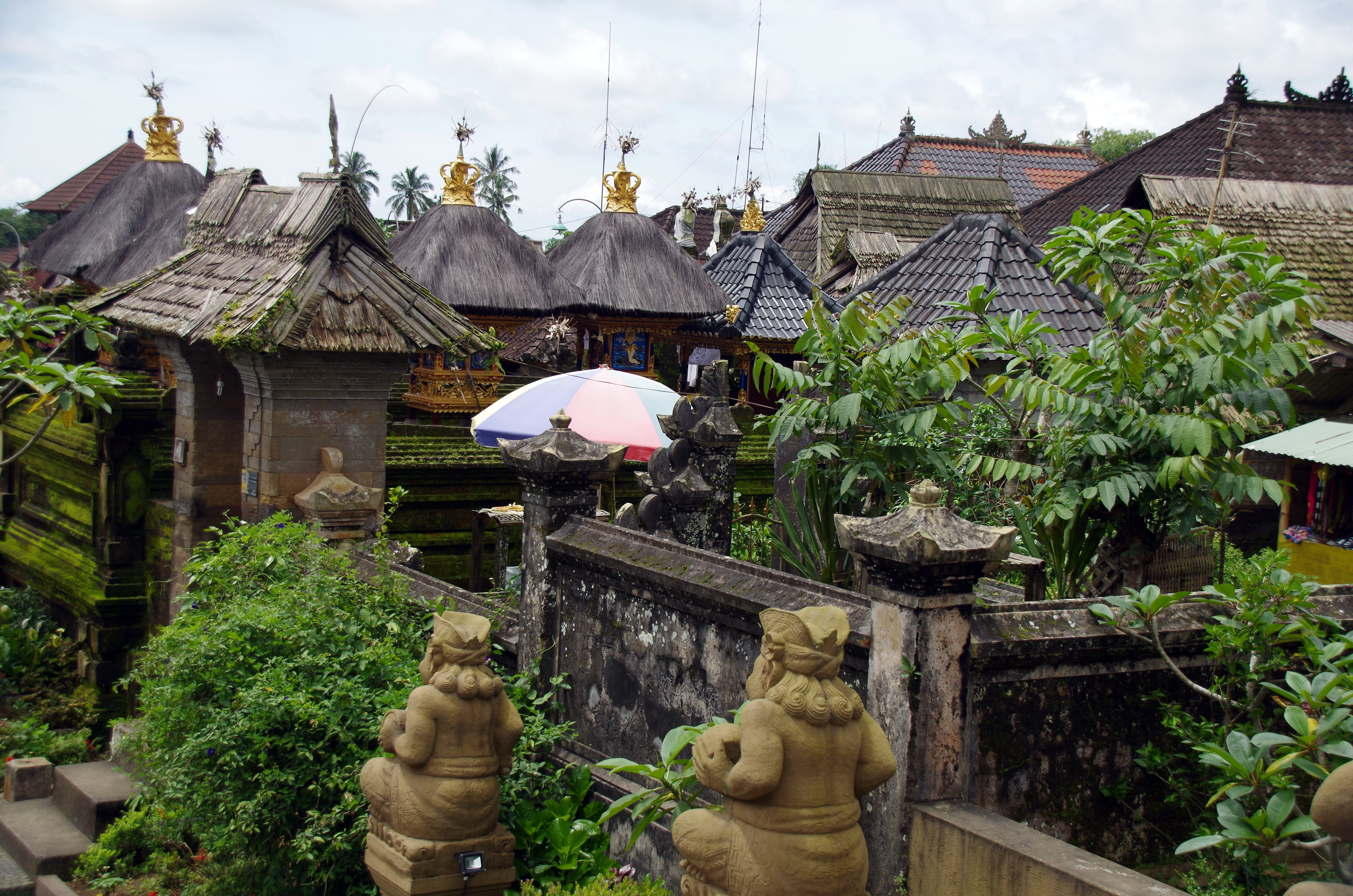
House in Penglipuran

Penglipuran (Balinese script: ᬧᭂᬗ᭄ᬮᬶᬧᬸᬭᬦ᭄; pronounced [pəŋliˈpuran]) is one of the traditional villages or kampung located in Bangli Regency, Bali Province, Indonesia. The village is famous as a tourist destination in Bali because the villagers still preserve their traditional culture in their daily lives. The architecture of buildings and land processing still follow the concept of Tri Hita Karana, the philosophy of Balinese society regarding the balance of relations between God, humans and their environment. Penglipuran succeeded in building tourism that benefited all of its community without losing its culture and traditions. In 1995, Penglipuran also received a Kalpataru award from the Indonesian government for its efforts to protect the bamboo forest in their local ecosystem.

== Geography ==
Penglipuran is located about 5 kilometers north of the town of Bangli and 45 kilometers north-east of Denpasar. The village is surrounded by other traditional villages: Kayang village in the north, Kubu village in the east, Gunaksa village in the south and Sansang river in the west.

The total area of this village reaches 112 hectares with an altitude of 500–600 meters above the sea. Temperatures vary from cool to cold (16-29 degrees) and averages rainfall around 2000 mm per year. Ground surface is considered flat and the soil is 5 to 15 meter thick.

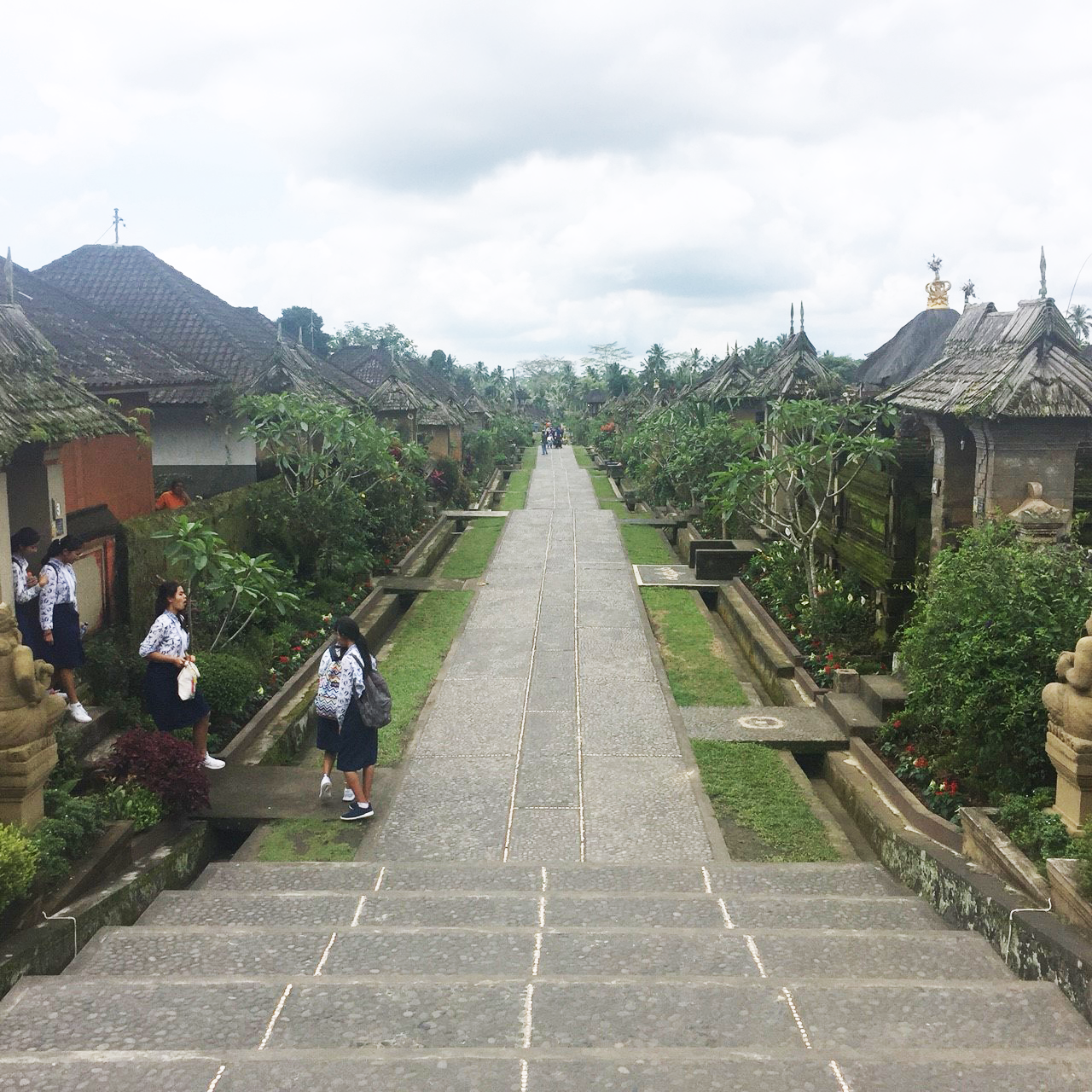
Main street in Penglipuran

== History ==
Penglipuran is believed to have been inhabited during the reign of I Dewa Gede Putu Tangkeban III. Almost all of the villagers believe that they are from the village of Bayung Gede. In that time, the people of Bayung Gede were experts in religious, custom and defense activities. Because of their abilities, they were often called to the Bangli Kingdom. But because of the distance, the Bangli kingdom finally provided a temporary area for the people of Bayung Gede to rest. This place is often referred to as a kubu bayung. Kubu means "camp" and bayung means "people from Bayung Gede". This place is then believed to be the village they live in now. They also believe that this is the reason for the similarity of traditional rules and building structure between Penglipuran and Bayung Gede.

Regarding the origin of the name Panglipuran, there are two different perceptions. The first is that Penglipuran comes from pengeling pura, with pengeling meaning 'to remember' and pura, or "temple", taking the meaning of "ancestral place". The second perception says that penglipura comes from the word pelipur which means "comfort" and lipur which means "unhappiness"; so the combined word penglipuran means 'a place for consolation'. This perception arose because the Bangli king was said to often visit this village to meditate.

== Society ==
=== Population ===
Based on records from Kelihan Dinas (officials below lurah that specifically handling government administration) in 2002, up until July there were 832 people living in Penglipuran. The 832 individuals consisted of 425 men and 407 women with 197 head of family. The families are divided by their status which is 76 head of families with pangayah / karma pangarep status (permanent members with customary rights and obligations) and 121 heads of families with pangayah/krama roban status (temporary member referred to as the responsibility of one of pangayah pangarep status).

The most recent data in early 2012 showed that there is no visible increase in the population of Penglipuran which consists of 980 individuals joined in 229 families (76 families), as indicated by I Wayan Kajeng, Chief Administrator of the Penglipuran Traditional Village. In 12 years the population in this village increased by 200 people.

=== Education and occupations ===
In 2002, 426 people from Penglipuran completed their elementary education, while 91 people had an education level up to junior high school. 156 people completed high school and 68 people managed to complete the highest level of education which is University. Most of Penglipuran people choose farming as their job, followed by becoming a private employee. The rest is divided between civil servants/ABRI, traders, breeders, craftsmen and the last one is laborers.

=== Marriage ===
Marriage and the family lineage are considered very important for people of Penglipuran. The majority of people in Penglipuran married people from their own village in order to preserve the family / clan lineage. Therefore, most of the population is still bound by blood relations with each other. If a man from Penglipuran marries a woman from another clan/family outside of Penglipuran, he still has to carry out his obligation as a member of the Penglipuran community.

== Tri Mandala land management ==
The land management of Penglipuran is strongly influenced by Tri Mandala. Following this concept, the land is divided into 3 zones according to their level of their purity. The zone is then placed according to the spiritual orientation called Kaja-Kelod. Things that are considered the most sacred are placed nearest to Mount Agung (the most sacred place in Bali) and the least sacred things are placed nearest to the sea.

1. Utama Mandala is at the northernmost side of the village, therefore this zone is considered as the most sacred place. It contains places called "Pura" or temples to worship of gods. Pura Puseh Desa is used to worship the god Brahma (creator god) and Pura Bale Agung is used to worship the God Wisnu (god of preservation).
2. Madya mandala is a zone for humans. Here the people of Penglipuran live with their families in a building unit called the pekarangan.
3. Nista mandala is in the southernmost side of the village and is an impure zone. Therefore, it contains the village grave and Pura Dalem or a place to worship God Shiva (god of destroyer).

The number of yards in this village is 77 with 1 "karang memadu" (a special "pekarangan" for family who practice polygamy) and 76 "karang kerti". Karang Kerti means a place to serve god by having a good married life.

Like village land management, the pekarangan also follows the Tri Mandala concept. "Utama Mandala" in one's pekarangan will contain a family temple to worship their god and ancestors. "Madya mandala" will consist of a kitchen, a bedroom, etc. where daily activities take place. Finally, Nista Mandala is usually used to dry clothes and store livestock.

One of the main components of almost the entire building in desa Penglipuran is bamboo. They use four or five layers of bamboo that are linked to each other to build the roofs, and they weave bamboo to make the walls that divide the rooms. Lately, however, they have begun to use modern construction materials because of the large amount of bamboo needed for the traditional technique. A pekarangan can be entered through two sides with the main door shaped like a gate and called angkul-angkul.
One of the other important buildings in this village is the bale banjar. This building does not have walls and is shared by residents for mass Ngaben ceremonies or community meetings.

== Awig-awig ==
To achieve mutual harmony in the community, residents of Penglipuran have two types of laws that they obey and follow, named Awig (written rules) and Drestha (unwritten customs).

=== Monogamy ===
For the people of Penglipuran, polygamy or having more than one wife is prohibited and considered taboo. If a person has more than one wife, he and his wives must move from Karang Kerti to Karang Memandu (outer part of the village). His rights and obligation as part of Penglipuran community are also revoked. After the person has moved, the villagers will build a house for them to live on but they will not be able to pass through public roads or enter the temple nor attend the traditional activities.

=== Worship at a given temple ===
Not all temples can be visited by everyone to worship, except the main temple which is Pura Besakih. Hindus of Bali have temples that they worship and go to. These temples are frequented by their respective families, including those in Penglipuran.

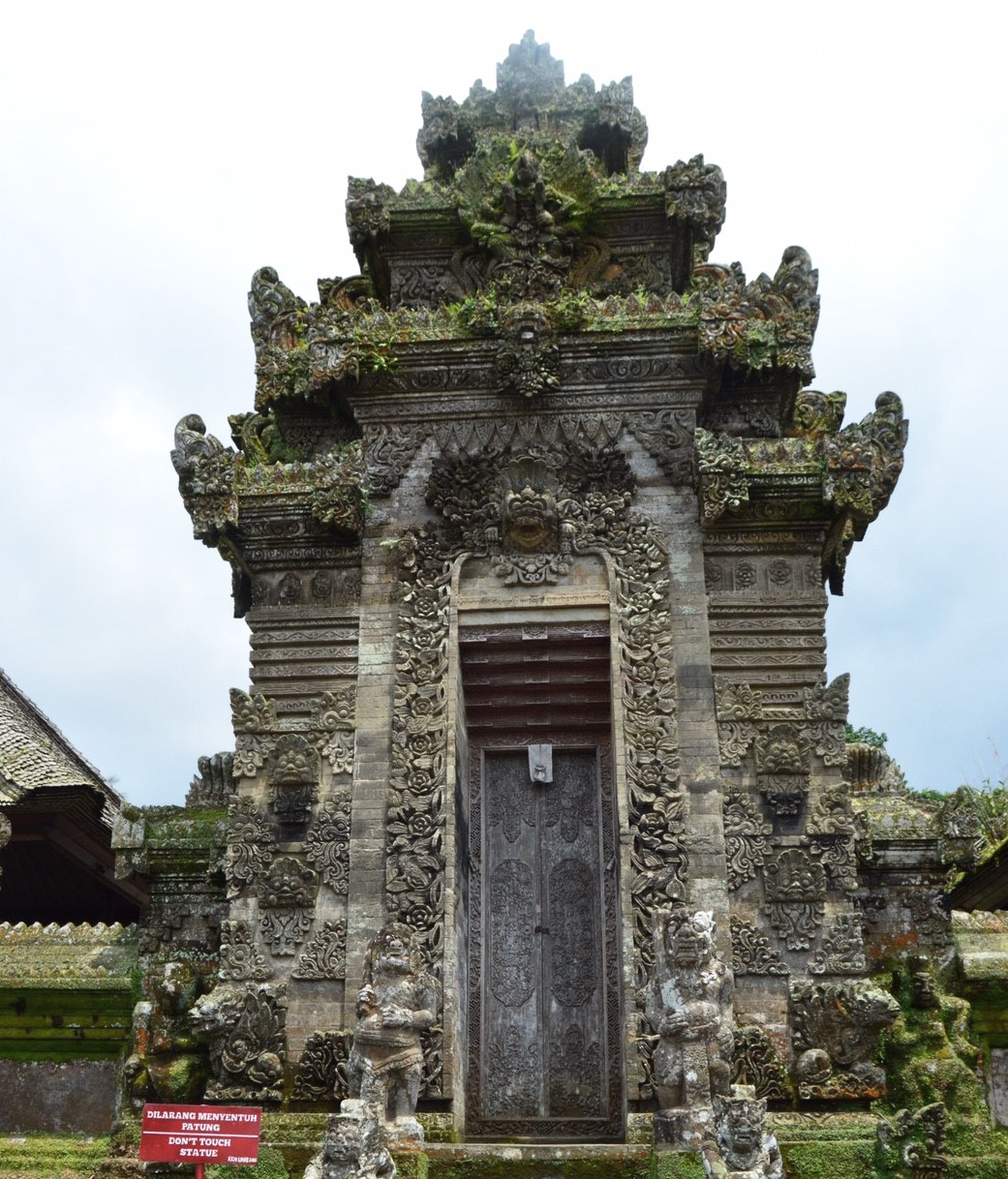
Temple in Penglipuran

==== Obligations to the main temple - Gebog Doma (inter-regional) ====
Because the people of Penglipuran are immigrants that have just come to a new area, they have to worship at the nearest temple of their area, Kehen Temple, which is the largest temple in the Bangli Region.

==== Obligations to Kahyangan Tiga (inter-village) ====
The most important obligation for Balinese people is to worship Kahyangan-Tiga located in their respective villages. In Penglipuran the obligation is divided into:

1. Penataran Temple - Temple to worship Brahma as the creator of the entire universe. The temple is located in the center of village, next to Puseh Temple.
2. Puseh Temple - Temple to worship Vishnu as a support for all life. This temple is located in the most sacred place in Penglipuran, and is the first temple that was built in this village.
3. Dalem Temple - Temple to worship Shiva as a god of fusion. This temple is located at the bottom of the village, leading to the sea. The villagers believe that it will help the souls of deceased people to return to their place.

Every 210 days based on the Balinese calendar, there is a galungan celebration organized by Kahyangan-Tiga members. Every citizen must prepare offerings, food, and things needed for the celebration.

==== Obligations in the family temple ====
In each family home yard there is a sanggah or a small temple intended for the ancestors of the family.

=== Village governance system ===
The Penglipuran Customary Village Government System was compiled in an Indigenous Leadership Institution called Prajuru Desa Adat Penglipuran. This institution consists of two parts named Kanca Roras and Bendesa or Kelihan Adat.

==== Kanca Roras ====
Kanca Roras is a representative assembly with 12 members. Kanca Roras is taken from the word Ka-anca which means assigned and roras / rolas which means twelve. Kanca roras has a function resembling an assembly of representatives or a legislative body and its formation is based on the order of leadership in the name of the ulu-apad system.

==== Kelihan Adat ====
Kelihan Adat are people who are chosen and is an elder in the custom. Kelihan Adat are executive officials whose appointments are made through elections at a public meeting (kajudi ring paruman desa). Kelihan adat have a duty only if they are given a mandate from Kanca Roras.

== Bamboo in Penglipuran ==
Bamboo from Penglipuran is one of the best bamboo that can be found in Bali. Penglipuran people believe that the bamboo forest does not grow by itself but rather was planted by their ancestors. Therefore bamboo is considered a symbol of their historical roots. The bamboo forest that grows on the village territory cover 37.7 hectares (previously 50 hectares); it includes 15 bamboo species. Some of the forest is managed directly under the Adat Desa as a Laba Pura (for the maintenance of temple buildings) while some is managed by several residents who have rights of use.

Bamboo is also used by the people of Penglipuran as a material for building and housing. Some of these buildings made of bamboo are:

=== Pawon ===
This building functions as a kitchen, a rice barn and a small place to rest. The pawon is built entirely of bamboo including roof, wall, bed, and even the tableware inside it.

=== Bale sakenem ===
The bale sakenem is a place for religious ceremonies that are exclusive to families. Ceremonies often performed at the bale sakenem are the Pitra Yadnya (Ngaben) and the Manusa Yadnya. This building has a roof made of bamboo.

=== Bale banjar ===
The bale banjar is a sort of community hall that can be used by all the people in the village. It has no walls, only a support pillar and is used for Ngaben ceremonies and community gatherings.

== Penglipuran as a tourist place ==
Starting in 1993, the Balinese government started promoting Penglipuran as a tourist destination. Trying to avoid tourism capitalism in the village, the Penglipuran community aimed for "community-based-tourism". With this concept, no individual benefits directly from tourism: the income generated by tourism funds developments in the village. Tourism actors such as tour guides, ticket guards and other officers are directly employed by the village and get paid from the amount of profit earned, for example 40% of the total ticket sales.

In addition, before the concept was implemented, the people of Penglipuran were usually able to benefit by inviting tourists to their pekarangan while explaining their traditions and culture. This was considered unfair because houses far from the main gate tend to get fewer opportunities. Therefore all houses have been given a number and each house receives tourists on a rota basis. Each house is also given the opportunity to sell souvenirs in their pekarangan by following the new concept; for example, 5,000 IDR from each souvenir sold must be paid to support village development.

Before 2012, due to poor accommodations, tourists only spent 10–20 minutes in the village but many tourists asked to stay to spend more time in the village. At that time the villagers were still doubtful because tourists might be a threat to their culture and traditions. But after 2012, tourists were allowed to stay after debriefing on how to behave in accordance with tradition and culture. This was later considered to have a good impact because it could expand employment opportunities in the future.

The Indonesian government has cited Penglipuran as the best tourism village in the country. The Dutch NGO Green Destinations foundation has recognized Penglipuran among the top three cleanest villages in the world - beside Giethoorn in the Netherlands and Mawlynnong in India - despite the soaring numbers of visitors. The 32,668 visitors in 2012 (14,069 domestic visitors and 18,599 international visitors) doubled in two years to reach 64,692 visitors in 2014 (39,005 domestic visitors and 25,687 international visitors). August 2023 has seen up to 3,500 visitors every day. The demand for the experience is particularly high during high season and Galungan and Kuningan festivals. During the Galungan, the village is decked up with rows of penjor or decorative bamboo poles on which are suspended unique accessories and young girls in Balinese traditional dress carry towering banten (trays of offerings) on their head from each home to the village pura or Hindu temple. In 2023, the village was open to tourism from 8 a.m. to 18 p.m.; in 2024 there were at least 4 homestay places in the village itself.

=== Impact of tourism ===
Penglipuran is a tradisional tourist village; tourism has brought tremendous changes in Penglipuran. Their work opportunities have diversified, but all is not well.

The bamboo forest, a sacred place, has been transformed with the creation of pedestrian tracks and an asphalt road.

To accommodate the high number of visitors, open areas such as rurung gede, of bare earth, have been laid with paving stones.

Each house entrance is preceded with the telajakan, an open space planted with, traditionally, plants that are used as part of religious ceremonies. Nowadays they are mostly planted with colorful modern plants deemed to "make the telajakan more beautiful"; the sacred aspect of the telajakan is further diminished by that it has become the access to individual souvenir shops.

The houses themselves are also losing a large part of their sacredness.
Traditionnally, the basic form of the house is square and its various spaces are organised in a particular way to follow the Tri Mandala philosophy. They include the sanggah (sacral and religious place, in the utama mandala part which is East); the paon (kitchen) and the bale adat (in the madya mandala part); the klumpu or lumbung (place to store rice); the loji (bedroom, in the Nista mandala which is West); and the teba (open space at the back with trees and a cattle pen).
With the introduction of new functions such as the souvenir shop and the homestay, not only the layout of the buildings is modified in ways that do not correspond any longer to the Tri Mandala philosophy, but it usually increases the density of the built space and reduces the surface of open space; for example the teba area is encroached upon to add more live-in space for the extended family.
Occidental mindsets may not fully grasp the impact of such changes in the buildings' organisation, on the way their inhabitants perceive themselves in relation to their environment and their society. But they can fully appreciate the damage brought by the use of asbestos as roof material "because it looks newer and is more practical" than the traditional bamboo tiles. Somewhat less damaging is the replacement of traditional materials for the floors in houses and public facilities, now often made of ceramic tiles because it looks more modern and more colorful and makes them look like city houses.; or the use of natural stone, brick, and concrete blocks with plaster finishing for the angkul-angkul (traditional gate) originally made from mud — because it makes their angkul-angkul "look new", because the materials are easier to source and because the building process is faster than with mud. It still means that the villagers do not have anymore the full mastering and / or independence in the sourcing of the materials for their own buildings; and that some pollution is involved in making and bringing in all the new materials — by which they also become more Westernized and lose touch a bit more with their avowed Tri Hita Karana philosophy principles.

Hendrawan and Susanti (2019) give a harsh but realistic conclusion and a brave alarm call: The culture that was inherited from Penglipuran villagers' ancestors is a local wisdom that aimed to protect and preserve the ecosystem. There has been a misunderstanding about the most important thing that has to be protected: it is not the idea of culture but its purpose, which is the natural environment. "When protecting the culture is the main purpose in a tourism village, this is called human museum."

Penglipuran

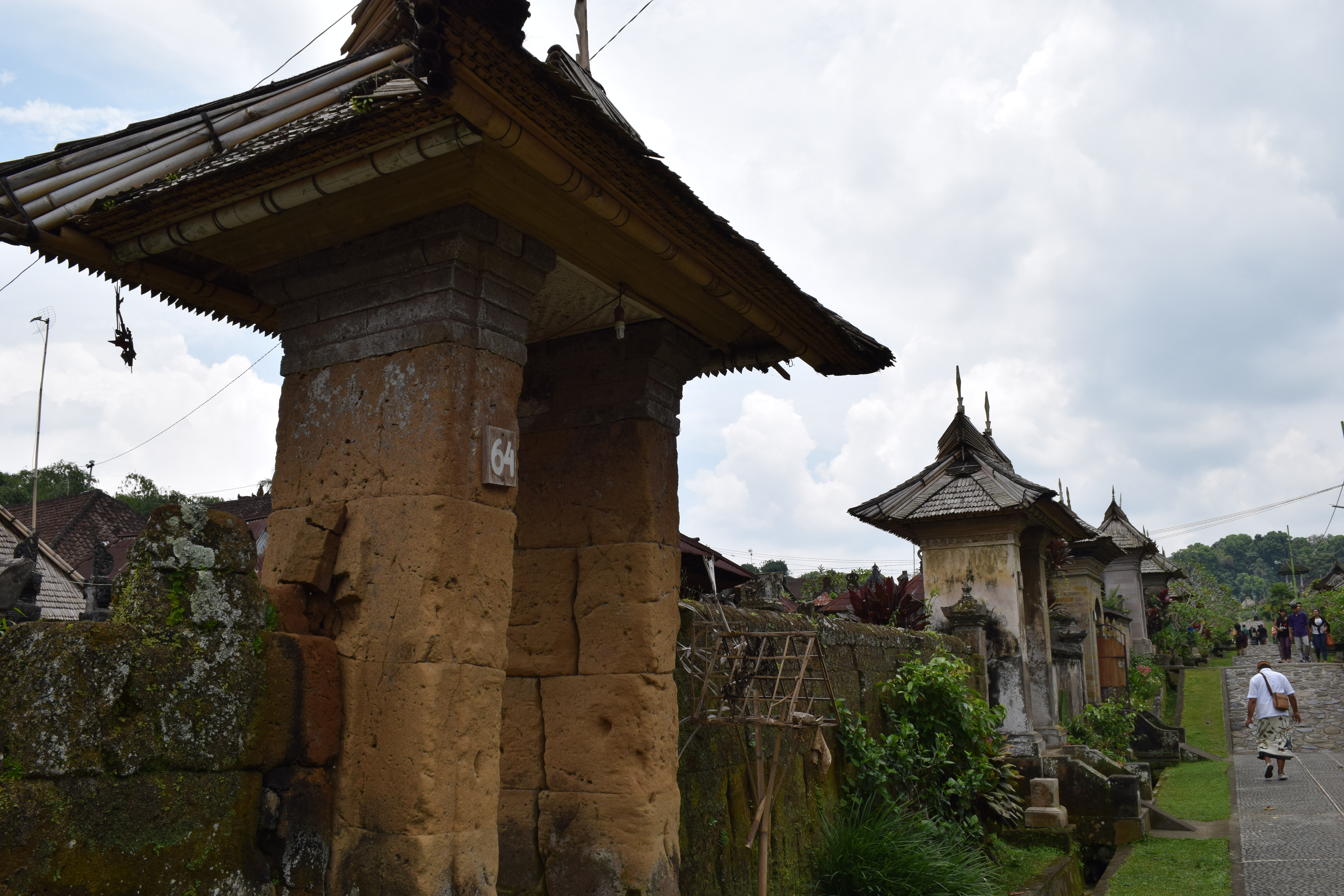
Angkul-angkul made of traditional mud

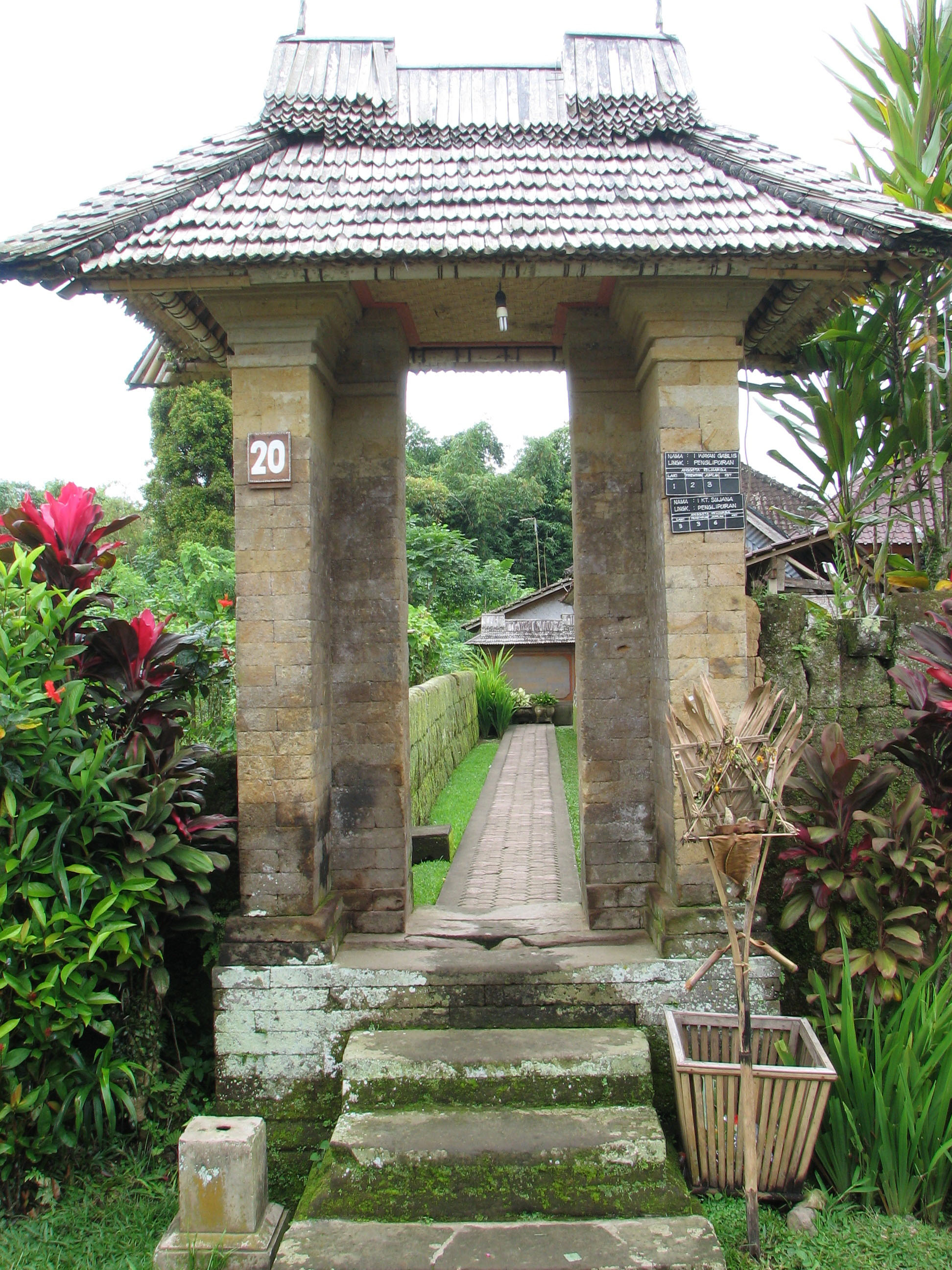
Angkul-angkul made of imported stone

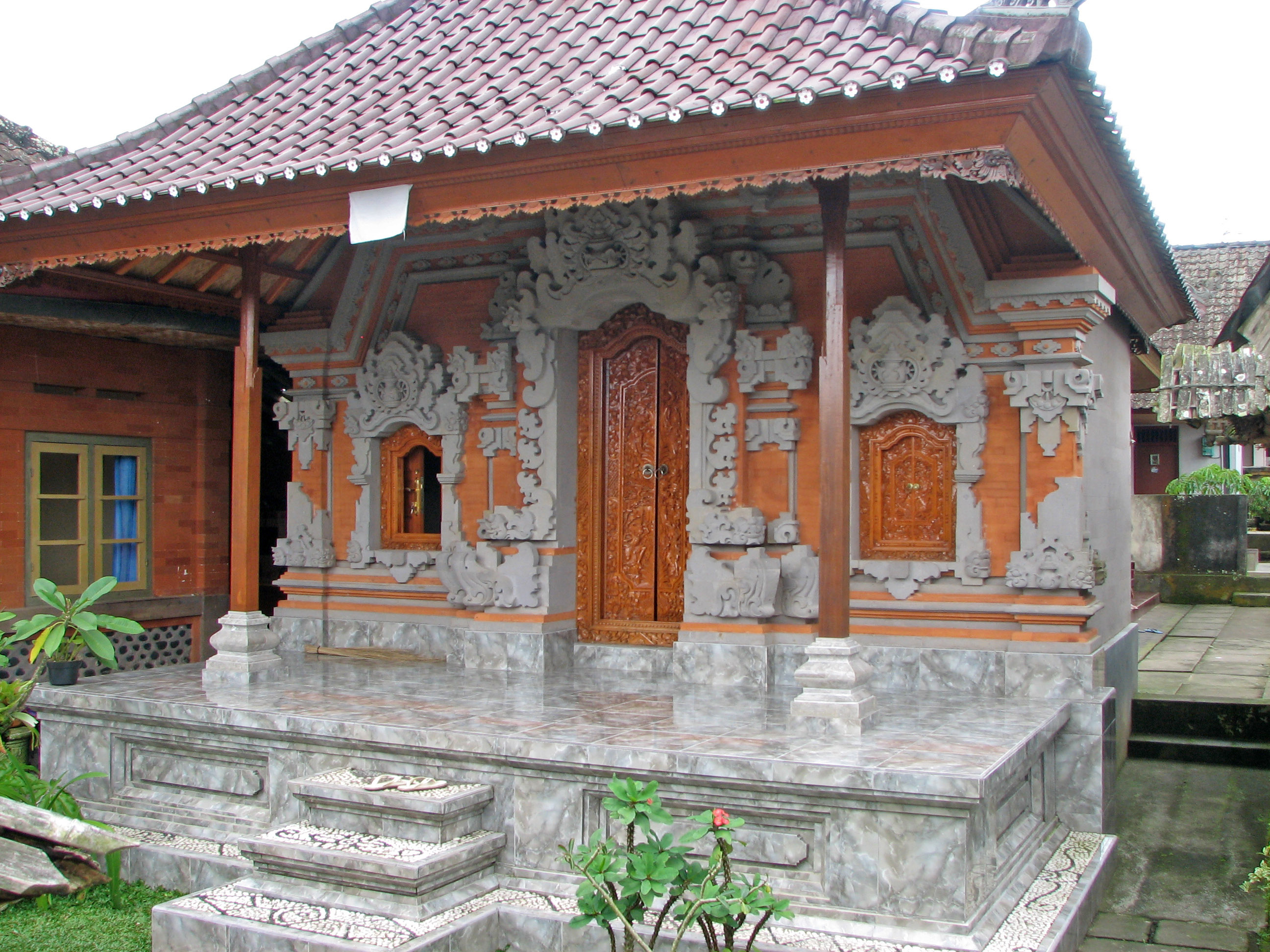
A building with marble floor and factory-made roof tiles

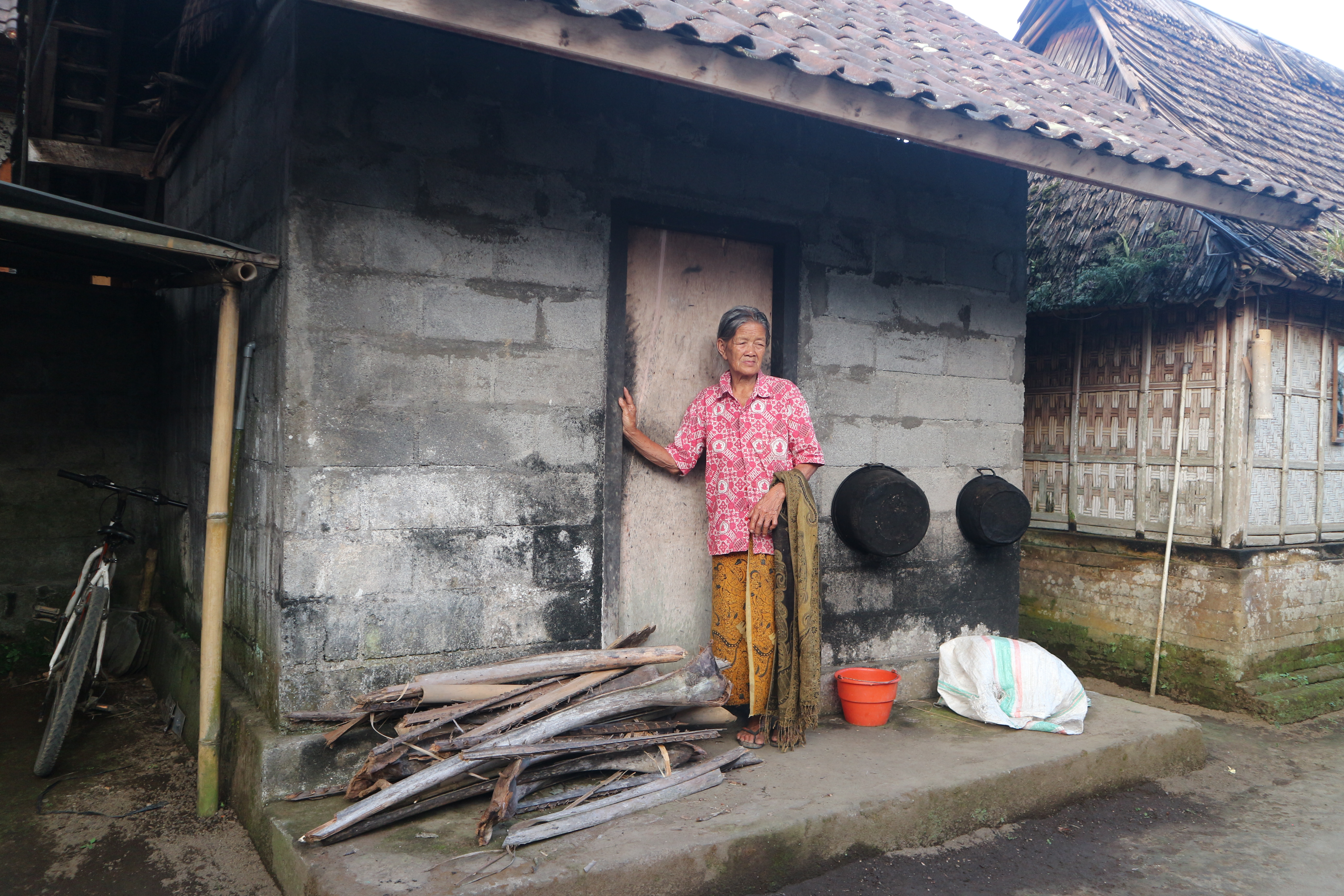
House made of concrete blocks

== Bibliography ==
- Hendrawan, Freddy; Susanti, Ardina (February 2019). "4. The influences of commodification into cultural aspects at Penglipuran as a tourism village in Bali". In Mohamed, Badaruddin; Widiastuti; Badarulzaman, Nurwati; Saraswati, A. A. Ayu Oka (eds.). Enhancing the Quality of Urban Space. Udayana University Press. pp. 161–172. ISBN 9786022942221.
