= Susut =

- District
- Location in Bangli Regency
- Country: Indonesia
- Province: Bali
- Regency: Bangli

Area
  - Total: 49.31 km^{2} (19.04 sq mi)

Population (2020)
  - Total: 48,682
  - Density: 987.3/km^{2} (2,557/sq mi)
- Time zone: UTC+08:00 (Indonesia Central Standard Time)
- Postal Code: 80661

Susut is a district (kecamatan) in Bangli Regency, Bali, Indonesia.
