= Tembuku =

- District
- Location in Bangli Regency
- Country: Indonesia
- Province: Bali
- Regency: Bangli

Area
  - Total: 48.32 km^{2} (18.66 sq mi)

Population (2020)
  - Total: 43,138
  - Density: 892.8/km^{2} (2,312/sq mi)
- Time zone: UTC+08:00 (Indonesia Central Standard Time)
- Postal Code: 80614

Tembuku is a district (kecamatan) in Bangli Regency, Bali, Indonesia.
