= Bangli Regency =

Regency in Bali, Indonesia

Bangli Regency Kabupaten Bangli
- Regency

Native transcription(s)
  - Balinese script: ᬓᬪᬹᬧᬢᬾᬦ᭄ ᬩᬗ᭄ᬮᬶ Kabupatén Bangli
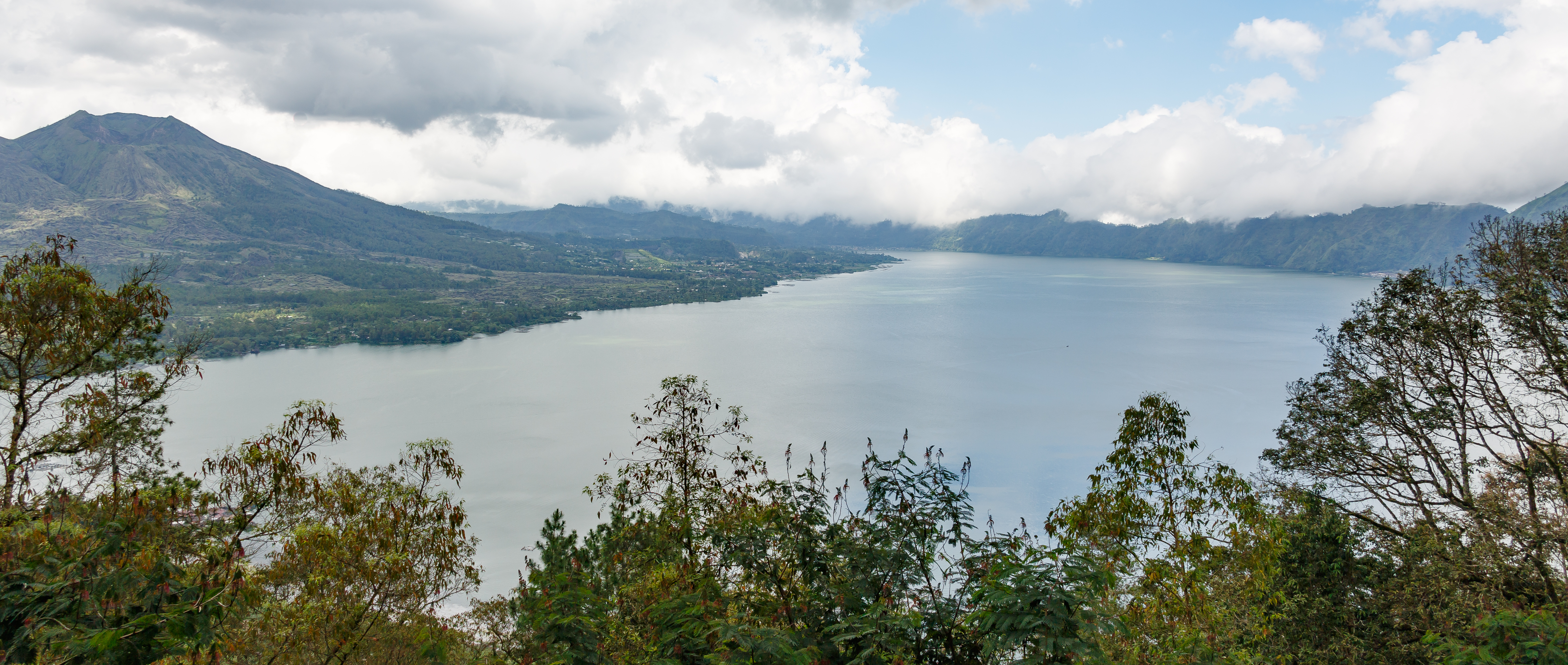
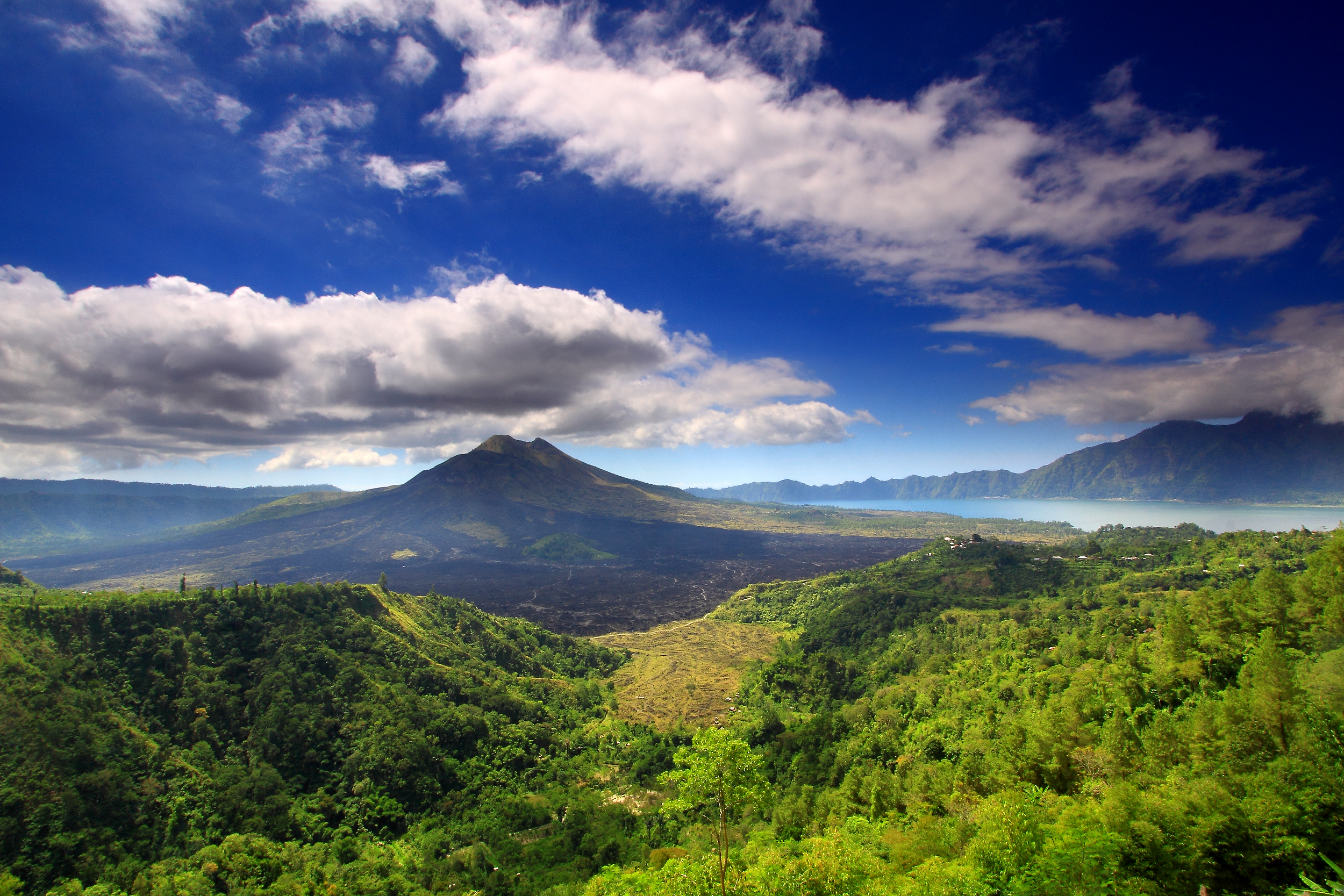
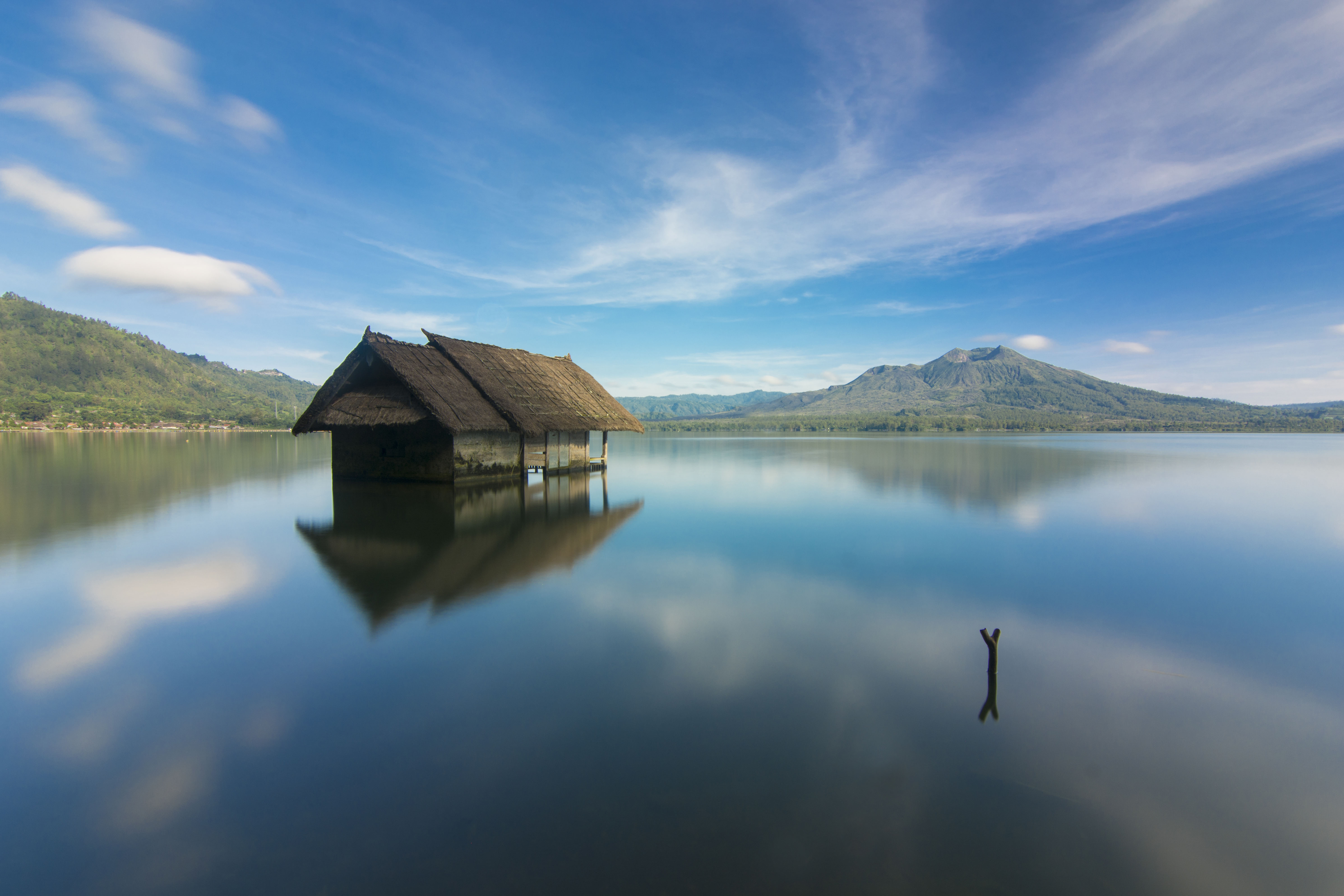
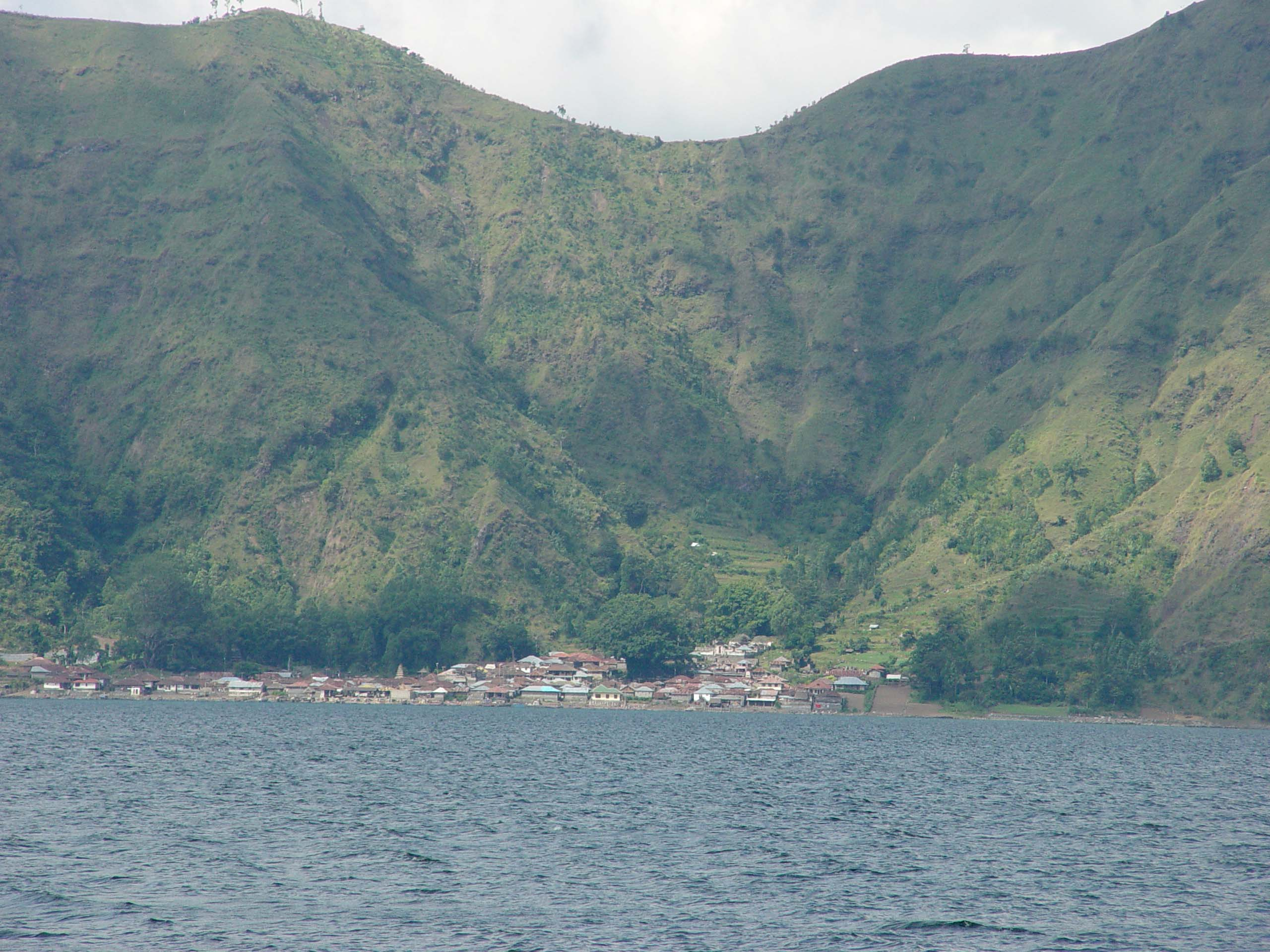
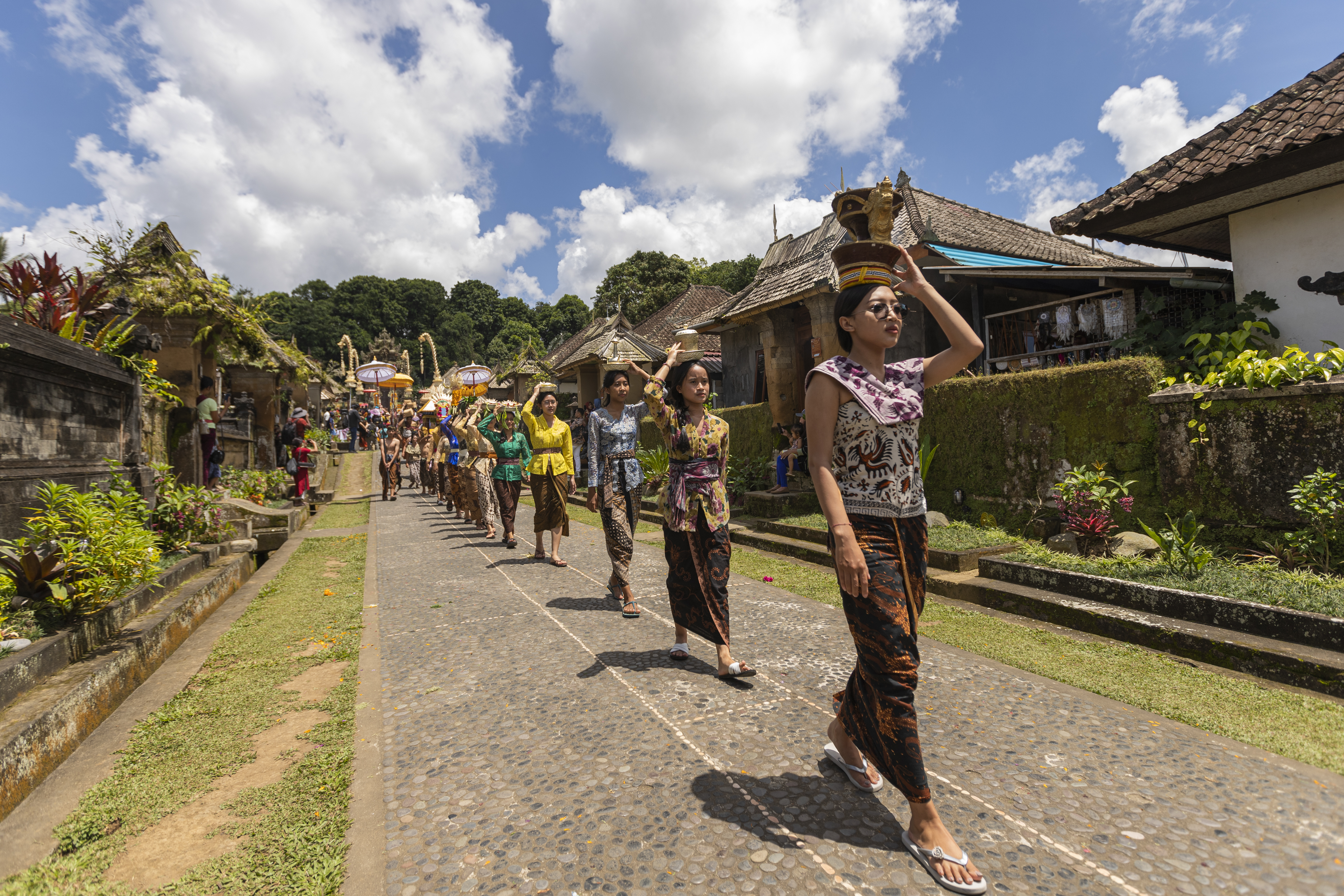
- Lake Batur, Kintamani Mount Batur A hut in Lake Batur Trunyan Penglipuran

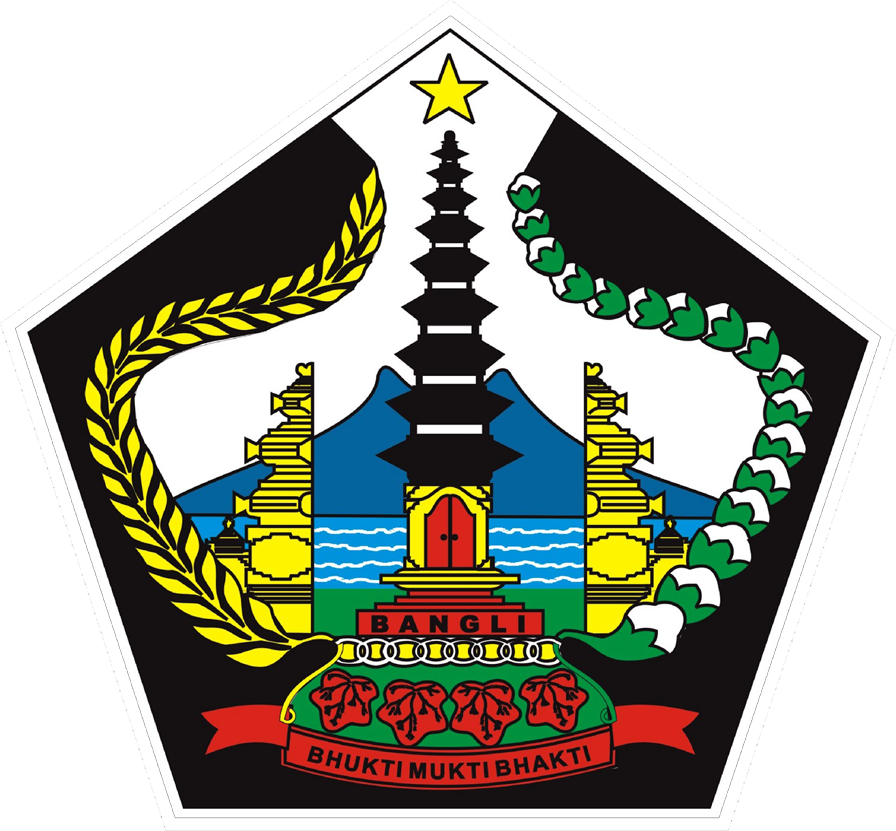
- Coat of arms
- Nickname: Gumi Loloh ('Land of Jamu') · Cold Regency/Region
- Motto: Bhūkti Mūkti Bhākti (Sanskrit) ᬪᬸᬓ᭄ᬢᬶᬫᬸᬓ᭄ᬢᬶᬪᬓ᭄ᬢᬶ "Devotion by Serving God and the Homeland for the Purpose of a Just and Prosperous Society Both Physically (Bhūkti) and Spiritually (Mūkti)"
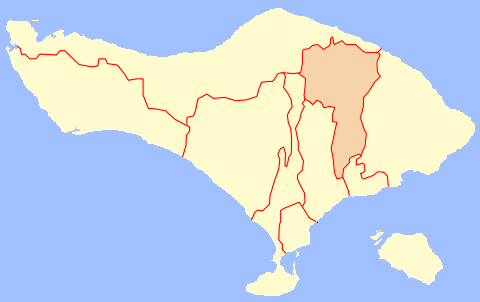
- Location within Bali

- Location in Bali Location in Lesser Sunda Islands Location in Indonesia Location in Southeast Asia Location in Asia
- Coordinates: 8°17′0″S 115°20′0″E
- Country: Indonesia
- Region: Lesser Sunda Islands
- Province: Bali
- Districts: List: Susut; Bangli; Tembuku; Kintamani
- Established: 14 August 1958
- Capital: Bangli

Government
  - Body: Bangli Regency Government
  - Regent: Sang Nyoman Sedana Arta (PDI-P)
  - Vice Regent: I Wayan Diar
  - Legislature: Bangli Regency Regional House of Representatives (DPRD)

Area
  - Total: 520.80 km^{2} (201.08 sq mi)

Population (mid 2024 estimate)
  - Total: 259,392
  - Density: 498.06/km^{2} (1,290.0/sq mi)

Demographics
  - Ethnic groups (2010): 96.48% Balinese; 2.18% Bali Aga; 0.77% Javanese; 0.11% Madurese; 0.05% Sasak; 0.04% Sundanese; 0.03% Chinese; 0.34% other
  - Religion (2024): 98.72% Hinduism; 1.00% Islam; 0.15% Christianity; 0.12% Protestanism; 0.03% Catholicism; 0.11% Buddhism; 0.02% Confucianism
  - Languages and dialects: Indonesian (official); Balinese (native); Lowland Balinese; Lowland Bangli Balinese; Highland Balinese; Highland Bangli Balinese other
- Time zone: UTC+08:00 (Indonesia Central Time)
- Area code: (+62) 366
- ISO 3166 code: ID-BA
- Vehicle registration: DK
- HDI (2023): ▲0.708 high
- Website: banglikab.go.id

Bangli Regency (Indonesian: Kabupaten Bangli; Balinese: ᬓᬪᬹᬧᬢᬾᬦ᭄ ᬩᬗ᭄ᬮᬶ, Kabupatén Bangli) is the one and only landlocked regency (kabupaten) of the province of Bali, Indonesia. It covers a land area of 520.80 km^{2}, and had a population of 259,392 in 2024. It is bordered by Badung Regency to its west, Gianyar Regency to its west and south, Buleleng Regency to its west and north, Karangasem Regency to its east and Klungkung Regency to its south. The administrative centre is at the town of Bangli.

Up until 1907, Bangli was one of the nine kingdoms of Bali. The capital has a famous Hindu temple, the Kehen Temple, which dates from the 11th century. Bangli also has one village which surrounds a hill, Demulih.

Pura Dalem Galiran is 1.4 km north-west of Bangli. Pura Dalem Penunggekan, 1.3 km south of the town center,

== Etymology ==
=== Legend ===
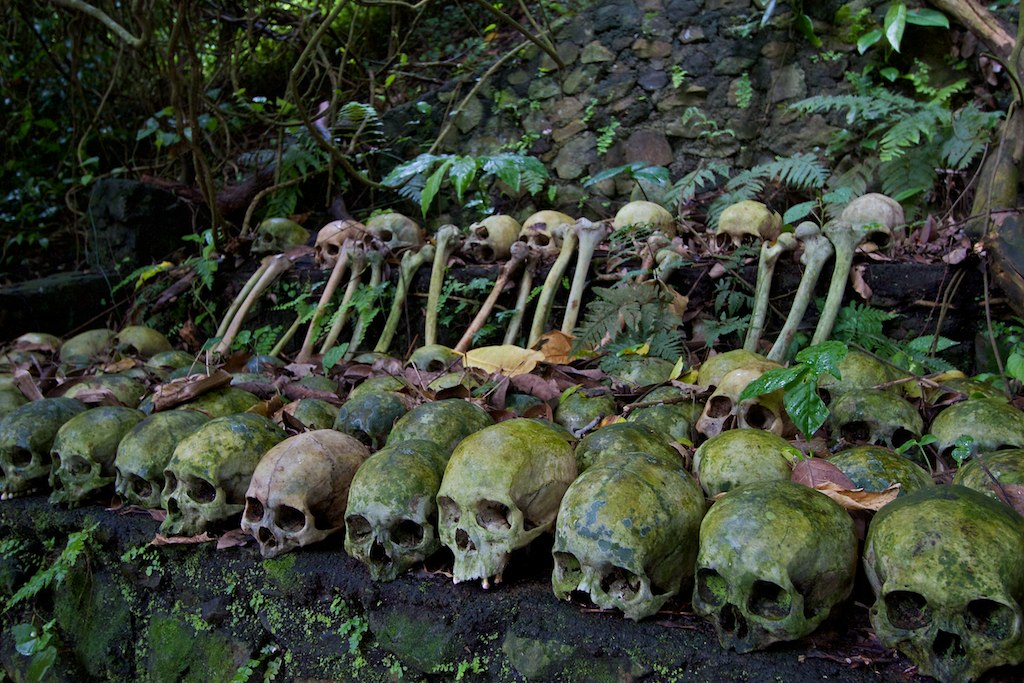
Ancient burial traditions of the Trunyan people in Kintamani

According to the Kehen Temple Inscription stored in the Kehen Temple, it is said that in the 11th century in Bangli Village, an epidemic called kegeringan developed which caused many residents to die. The other residents who were still alive and healthy were scared to death, so they left the village in droves to avoid the epidemic. As a result, Bangli Village became empty because no one dared to live there.

King Ida Bhatara Guru Sri Adikunti Ketana who was reigning at that time tried to overcome the epidemic. After the situation recovered, the king who reigned in the year Caka 1126, on the 10th of the Bright Half Year, Maula Market Day, Kliwon, Chandra (Monday), Wuku Klurut precisely on 10 May 1204, ordered his sons and daughters named Dhana Dewi Ketu to invite the residents to return to Bangli Village to jointly build and repair their respective houses as well as hold ceremonies/yadnya in the months of Kasa, Karo, Katiga, Kapat, Kalima, Kalima, Kanem, Kapitu, Kaulu, Kasanga, Kadasa, Yjahstha and Sadha. In addition, the king also ordered all residents to increase their descendants in the Pura Loka Serana area in Bangli Village and allowed the clearing of forests to make rice fields and water channels. For that reason, at every major ceremony, the residents in Bangli Village must perform prayers. At that time, on 10 May 1204, King Idha Bhatara Guru Sri Adikunti Katana uttered a decree, namely:

Whoever does not submit and violates orders, may that person be struck by lightning without rain or suddenly fall from a bridge without cause, blind eyes without a clamp, after death his soul is tortured by Yamabala, thrown from the sky down into the fires of hell.

Starting from the King's decrees issued on 10 May 1204, that date was determined as the birthday of Bangli City.

== History ==
=== Protohistory ===
==== Manikliyu, burial and Pejeng-type drum ====
In Manikliyu (located within the west side of Bangli Regency), a burial site was excavated in 1997 and 1998 which revealed two large sarcophagi and a bronze kettle drum, representing a unique burial system thus far unknown in Indonesia. The largest sarcophagus (length 206 cm, width 70 cm) is well preserved; the other sarcophagus (length 172 cm, width 69 cm) is partly broken. The bronze kettle drum (height 120 cm, diameter of the tympanon 77 cm) is decorated with eight stars on the tympanon, and human masks on the body. It contained human bones in flexed position that belonged to a young man of Mongoloid type, between 20 and 35 years old; the broken part of his upper face shows that he was killed by the impact of a sharp tool. The burial site also contained carnelians, beads, bronze spirals and bronze finger protectors. Some remnants broken pottery and pottery shards were also found beside the burial site and near the containers.

The drum is very similar to the Pejeng type, the latter referring to the Moon of Pejeng, largest single-cast bronze kettle drum known in the world, found in Pejeng (village east of Ubud, Gianyar Regency). A. Calo suggests that such kettle drums were associated with early rice cults – and cultivation – in Bali: most of them are found near sources of irrigation water (lakes, springs or weirs in rivers); their shape and decoration are reminded in modern representations of female deities associated with rice and irrigation water, the latter originating in a pre-Hindu culture and later integrated into the Hindu-Balinese panel of gods. Ritual ceremonies honouring these deities are still held to this day at places where irrigation water first enters fields (bedugul) and at crater lakes, the highest sources.

==== Taman Bali and Bunutin sarcophagi ====
At Taman Bali and Bunutin, two villages close to each other about 5 km south of Bangli, five sarcophagi were known before 1973. Two more were signalled in 1973, one of which buried 3 m deep in a rice field with its lid lying nearly 1.5 m away and partly broken, and containing various bronze objects including a small shovel, a ring, arm and ankle-rings and a number of spirals different from any formerly found in sarcophagi in Bali. The other sarcophagus signalled in 1973 was found by the villagers in Bunutin in 1971, buried nearly 1.5 m deep; its lid is absent and no associated artefacts were found. One of the five sarcophagi known before 1973 is kept in Gedong Arca Museum in Bedulu; as of 1974, the others were still in their place of discovery.

=== Establishment of the Bangli Kingdom ===
The story of the establishment of the Bangli Kingdom can be traced from the palm leaves in the Puri Agung Bangli and the King Purana Batur. It is said that the Bangli Kingdom was founded by I Dewa Gede Den Bencingah in the 15th century or around 1600 AD.

Initially, this kingdom was founded after the fall of the Majapahit Kingdom which had an impact on the Gelgel Kingdom (the Bali and Lombok regions). Dewa Agung Ketut, the ruler of Bali and Lombok divided his territory into vassal kingdoms.

Bangli became one of the vassal kingdoms under the direct government center of Gelgel Kingdom with the appointment of I Gusti Wija Pulada as Anglurah in Bali in 1453.

Then, in 1686 Bangli separated from Gelgel Kingdom and became a sovereign kingdom along with the rebellion of I Gusti Agung Maruti in Gelgel. Puri Bangli was founded as the center of the Bangli kingdom city by I Dewa Gde Bencingah around 1576 AD.

I Dewa Gde Bencingah was the eldest son of the king of the Bhresika Kingdom (Klungkung), I Dewa Gede Anom Oka with his consort Dewa Ayu Mas Dalem. Initially, the Bangli area was the Jarak Bang forest area.

I Dewa Gede Anom Oka ordered his son to build a palace/city in the Jarak Bang forest which would later be named Bangli.

The area covered the west of the Sungai Melangit and gathered people from the northwest, east, north, to the mountainous areas. In addition, I Dewa Gede Anom Oka also ordered to establish a sthana for the gods and Betara Toya Mas Arum. Currently, the sthana in question is known as Pura Penataran Agung Bangli.

In accordance with his father's order, I Dewa Gede Den Bencingah began to organize the Jarang Bang forest together with his followers. He then built a palace named Puri Rum, which was also used as the center of government. This area continued to be developed, until it became Bangli as it is known today.

In the early 1800s AD, the Dutch began to enter Bali and had a major impact on the existence of kingdoms in Bali. Intervention from the Dutch disrupted the governments in Bali so that several kingdoms began to face their decline.

=== The Fall of the Bangli Kingdom ===
On 26 April 1848, the King of Bangli at that time submitted a request to General Michiels to expand his power to the areas of Buleleng Kingdom, Karangasem, Mengwi, and Gianyar. The request was not immediately granted by the Dutch.

On 25 June 1849, I Dewa Gede Tangkeban was crowned King of Bangli and given power by the Dutch to rule Bangli and Buleleng. 5 years later, precisely on 15 February 1854, the king returned the Buleleng region to the Dutch on the grounds that the King of Bangli could concentrate more on securing his kingdom from attacks by the King of Gianyar and Karangasem.

The division between the kingdoms in Bali was inseparable from the intervention of the Dutch East Indies Government at that time. There were many rebellions against the Dutch such as Puputan Badung in 1906 and Puputan Klungkung in 1909.

Shortly after, the Bangli Kingdom declared its submission to the Dutch, until finally the entire region in Bali was controlled by the Dutch East Indies Government.

The list of kings in the Bangli Kingdom is as follows:

- Dewa Gede Tangkeban I (from Nyalian-1804)
- God Rahi (1804–1815)
- Dewa Gede Tangkeban II (1815–1833) [son of Dewa Gede Tangkeban I]
- Dewa Gede Tangkeban III (1833–1875) [son of Dewa Gede Tangkeban II]
- Dewa Gede Oka (1875–1880) [son of *Dewa Gede Tangkeban III]
- Dewa Gede Ngurah (1881–1892) [brother of Dewa Gede Oka]
- Dewa Gede Cokorda (1894–1911) [brother of Dewa Gede Ngurah]
- Dewa Gede Rai (regent 1913–1925) [brother of Dewa Gede Cokorda]
- Dewa Gede Taman (regent 1925–1930) [grandson of Dewa Gede Tangkaban III]
- Dewa Putu Bukian (caretaker 1930–1931) [grandson of Dewa Gede Tangkaban III]
- Anak Agung Ketut Ngurah (ruler, used the title Anak *Agung, 1931–1950; died 1961) [son of Dewa Gede Cokorda]

Bangli joined the Unitary State of the Republic of Indonesia in 1950.

== Government and politics ==
No.	Regent	Start of office	End of office	Vice Regent
10	Sang Nyoman Sedana Arta	26 February 2021	Incumbent	I Wayan Diar

=== Parliament ===
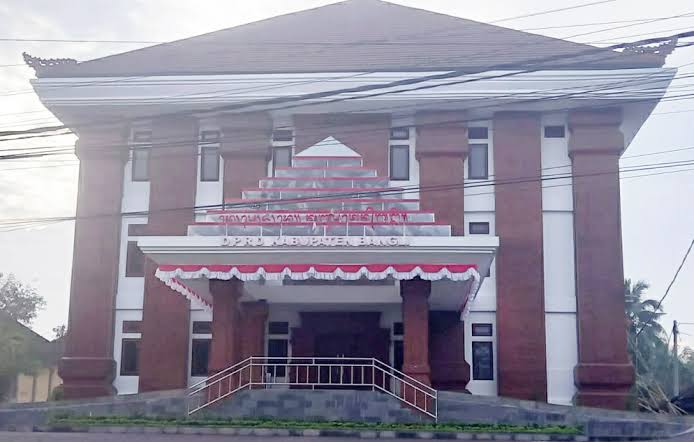
Bangli's parliament (DPRD) building

=== Administrative districts ===
The Regency is divided into four districts (kecamatan), listed below with their areas and their populations at the 2010 Census and the 2020 Census, together with the official estimates as of mid-2024. The most northern district – Kintamani, which is the primary highland region for the cultivation of arabica coffee – occupies over 70% of the regency's area and has 43% of its population. The table also includes the locations of the district administrative centres, the number of administrative villages in each district (totaling 68 rural desa and 4 urban kelurahan – the latter all in Bangli District), and its postal codes.

Susut district

Bangli district

Tembuku district

Kintamani district

Kode Wilayah	Name of District (kecamatan)	Area in km^{2}	Pop'n 2010 Census	Pop'n 2020 Census	Pop'n mid 2024 Estimate	Admin centre	No. of villages	Post code
51.06.01	Susut	49.3	43,202	48,682	49,658	Susut	9	80661
51.06.02	Bangli	56.3	48,267	54,438	54,283	Bangli	9	80611 – 80614
51.06.03	Tembuku	48.3	33,806	43,138	43,736	Tembuku	6	80671
51.06.04	Kintamani	366.9	90,078	112,463	111,715	Kintamani	48	80652
	Totals	520.8	215,353	258,731	259,392		72	

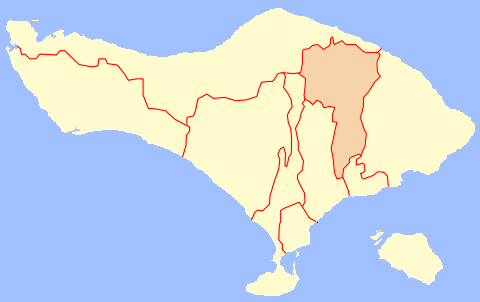
Map of Bangli Regency in Bali

Map of districts in Bangli Regency

List of districts and villages in Bangli Regency as follows:

Code	Districts	Urban villages	Rural villages	Status	List
51.06.02	Bangli	4	5	Rural villages	Bunutin; Kayubihi; Landih; Pengotan; Taman Bali
51.06.02	Bangli	4	5	Urban villages	Bebalang; Cempaga; Kawan; Kubu
51.06.04	Kintamani	-	48	Rural villages	Abangsongan; Abuan; Awan; Bantang; Banua; Batudinding; Batukaang; Batur Selatan; Batur Tengah; Batur Utara; Bayungcerik; Bayung Gede; Belancan; Belandingan; Belanga; Belantih; Binyan; Bonyoh; Buahan; Bunutin; Catur; Daup; Dausa; Gunungbau; Katung; Kedisan; Kintamani; Kutuh; Langgahan; Lembean; Mangguh; Manikliyu; Mengani; Pengejaran; Pinggan; Satra; Sekaan; Sekardadi; Selulung; Serai; Siakin; Songan A; Songan B; Subaya; Sukawana; Suter; Terunyan; Ulian
51.06.01	Susut	-	9	Rural villages	Abuan; Apuan; Demulih; Pengiangan; Penglumbaran; Selat; Sulahan; Susut; Tiga
51.06.03	Tembuku	-	6	Rural villages	Bangbang; Jehem; Peninjoan; Tembuku; Undisan; Yangapi
	TOTAL	4	68		

== Geography ==
=== Generalities ===
Bangli is the only regency in Bali which is landlocked. Its northern part includes the crater in which Gunung Batur sits, and the main road from Ubud in the south to the north coast through Kintamani and around Gunung Batur's crater.

From the Demulih hill some 3 km west of Bangli, much of southern part of the island can be seen: Kuta, Nusa Dua, Gianyar and a part of Klungkung.

=== Climate ===
Bangli has a tropical rainforest climate (Köppen Af) bordering upon a tropical monsoon climate (Am) with moderate rainfall from April to October and heavy rainfall from November to March.

Climate data for Bangli
Month	Jan	Feb	Mar	Apr	May	Jun	Jul	Aug	Sep	Oct	Nov	Dec	Year
Mean daily maximum °C (°F)	28.4 (83.1)	28.5 (83.3)	28.6 (83.5)	29.2 (84.6)	28.8 (83.8)	28.1 (82.6)	27.5 (81.5)	27.8 (82.0)	28.4 (83.1)	29.3 (84.7)	29.1 (84.4)	28.8 (83.8)	28.5 (83.4)
Daily mean °C (°F)	24.4 (75.9)	24.4 (75.9)	24.3 (75.7)	24.4 (75.9)	24.0 (75.2)	23.2 (73.8)	22.8 (73.0)	23.1 (73.6)	23.6 (74.5)	24.4 (75.9)	24.5 (76.1)	24.5 (76.1)	24.0 (75.1)
Mean daily minimum °C (°F)	20.4 (68.7)	20.4 (68.7)	20.1 (68.2)	19.6 (67.3)	19.3 (66.7)	18.4 (65.1)	18.2 (64.8)	18.4 (65.1)	18.9 (66.0)	19.5 (67.1)	20.0 (68.0)	20.3 (68.5)	19.5 (67.0)
Average rainfall mm (inches)	305 (12.0)	331 (13.0)	208 (8.2)	113 (4.4)	119 (4.7)	110 (4.3)	128 (5.0)	65 (2.6)	98 (3.9)	123 (4.8)	176 (6.9)	275 (10.8)	2,051 (80.6)
Source: Climate-Data.org

== Demographics ==
=== Population ===
It had a population of 215,353 at the 2010 Census and 258,721 at the 2020 Census; the official estimate as at mid 2022 was 267,133 – comprising 134,500 males and 132,600 females.

=== Ethnicities ===
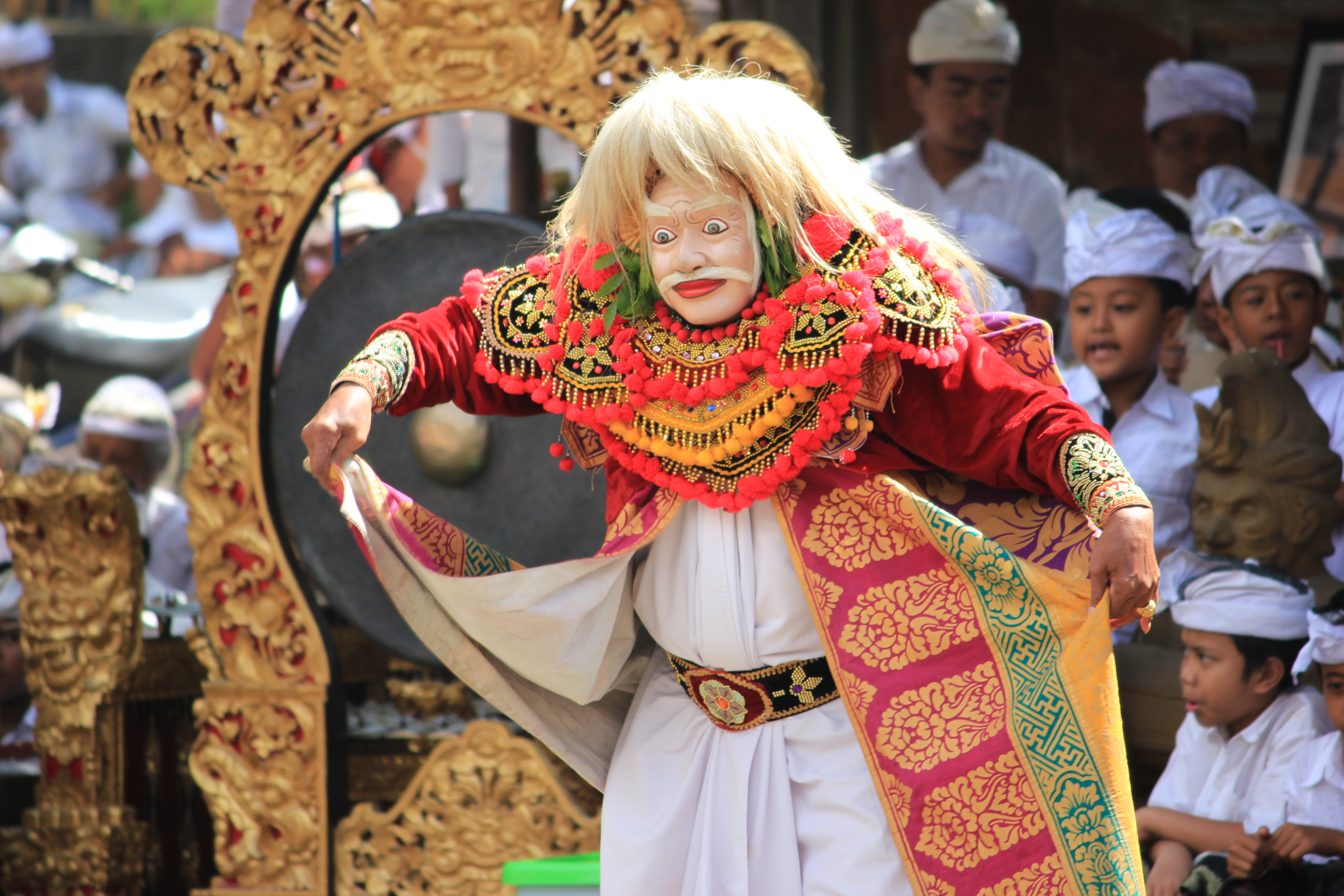
Mask Dance in Bangli, 2015

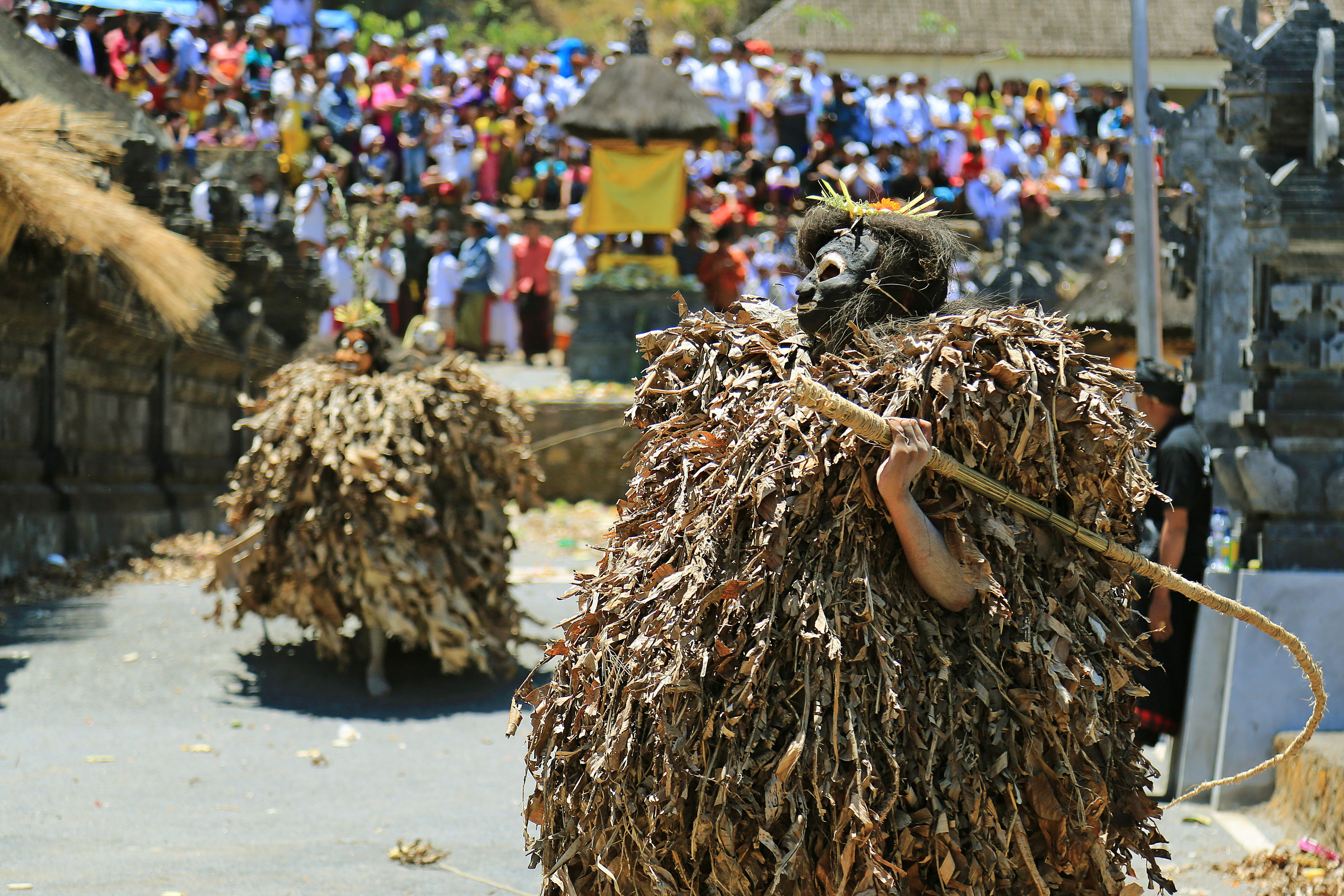
Barong Brutuk Dance, Trunyan

The majority of ethnic groups in Bangli are the Balinese, and Bali Aga tribes. While other ethnicities are fewer, when compared to other districts and cities in the province of Bali. Based on data from Central Bureau of Statistics in Indonesian Population Census 2010, as many as 207,779 people or 96.48% of the 215,353 people of Bangli Regency are of the Balinese ethnic group. Then the Bali Aga as much as 2.18%, and several others such as the Javanese, Sasak, Madurese, and several others ethnic.

The following is the population of Bangli Regency based on ethnicity in 2010:

No.	Ethnic groups	Pop. (2010)	Pct. (%)
1	Balinese	207,779	96.48%
2	Bali Aga	4,702	2.18%
3	Javanese	1,658	0.77%
4	Madurese	236	0.11%
5	Sasak	101	0.05%
6	Sundanese	88	0.04%
7	Chinese	66	0.03%
8	Others	723	0.34%
	Bangli Regency	215,353	100%

=== Religion ===
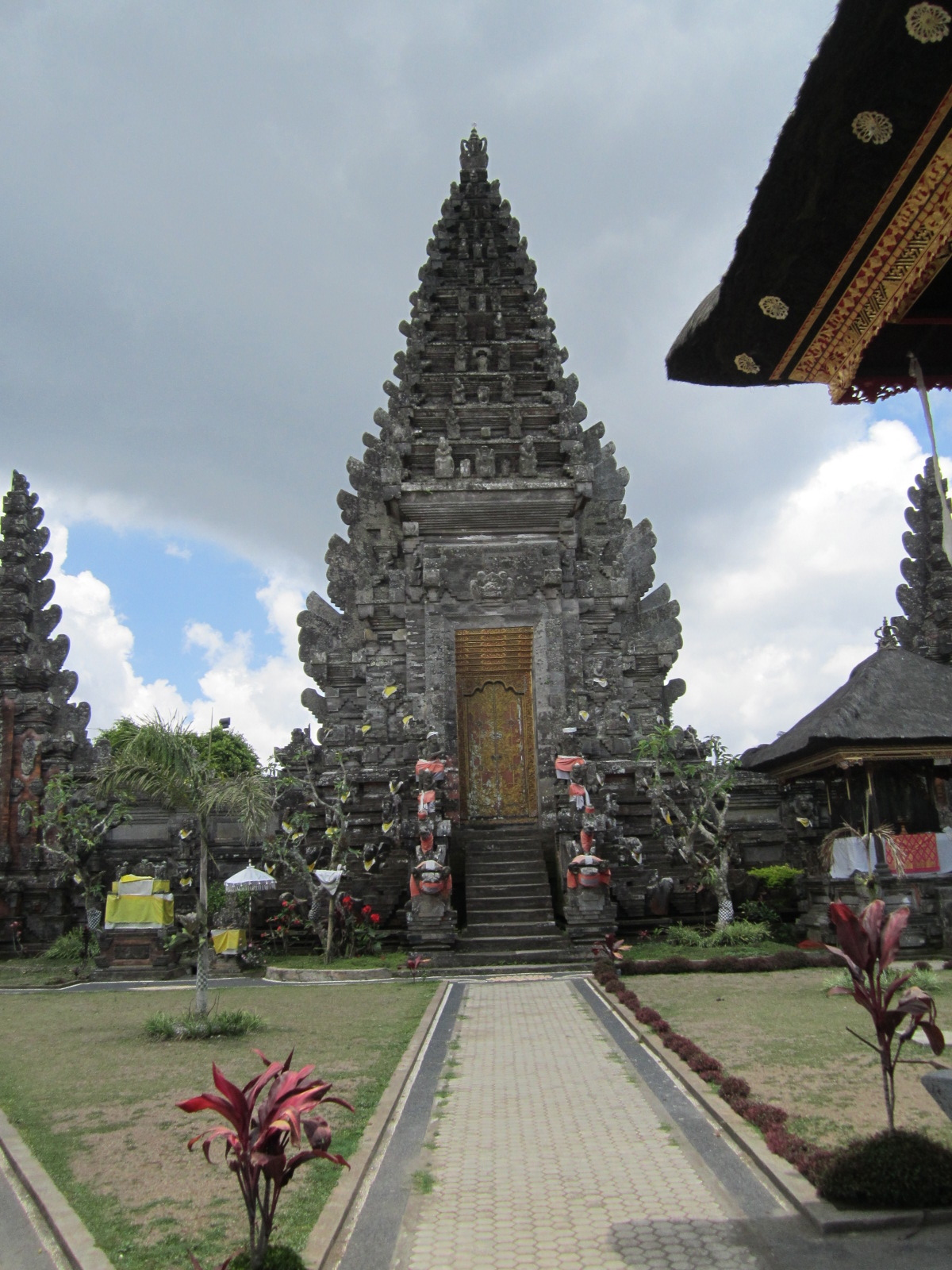
Ulun Danu Batur Temple

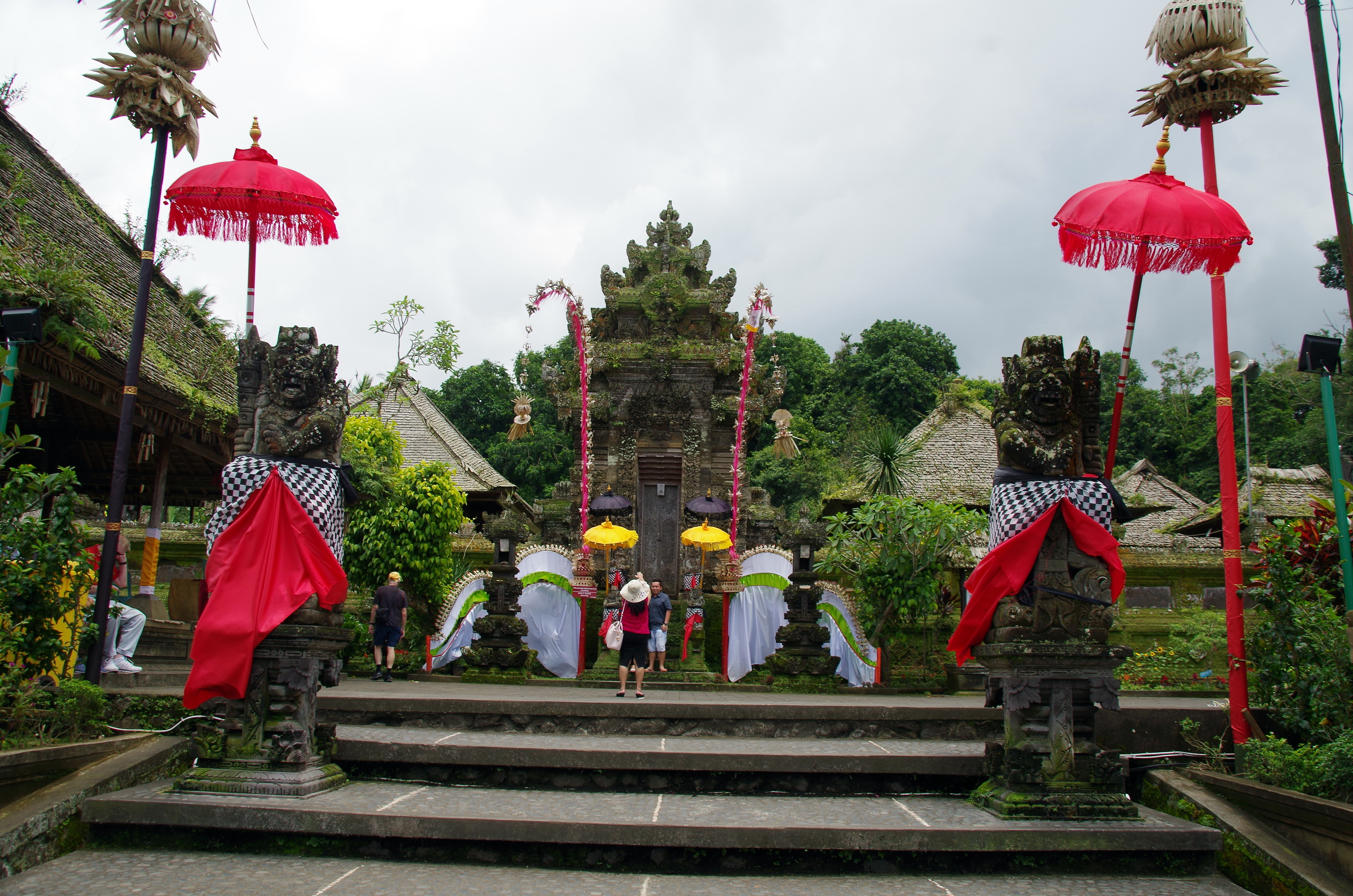
Penglipuran Penataran Temple, Pekraman Village, Penglipuran

The majority of Bangli residents are Hindu. When compared to other districts and cities in the province of Bali, the population of Bangli is more Hindu, while the population with other religions is smaller. Data from the Ministry of Home Affairs in mid-2023, the population that adheres to Hindu is 98.72%. The rest adhere to Islam religion as much as 1.00%, then Christianity as much as 0.15%, Buddhism as much as 0.11% and Confucianism as much as 0.02%.

== Tourism ==
Tourism is the main economic sector of Bangli Regency, tourism is the mainstay of the district's economy. There are several tourist attractions in Bangli district, including:

- Penelokan Hot Springs
- Batur Geopark Museum
- Mount Batur Caldera
- Demulih Hill
- Dusun Kuning Waterfall
- Slau Waterfall
- Tukad Cepung Waterfall
- Batur Lake
- Penglipuran Village
- Batukaang Ancient Village
- Pura Dalem Jawa (Langgar)
- Kehen Temple
- Trunyan
- Krisik Waterfall

== Gallery ==
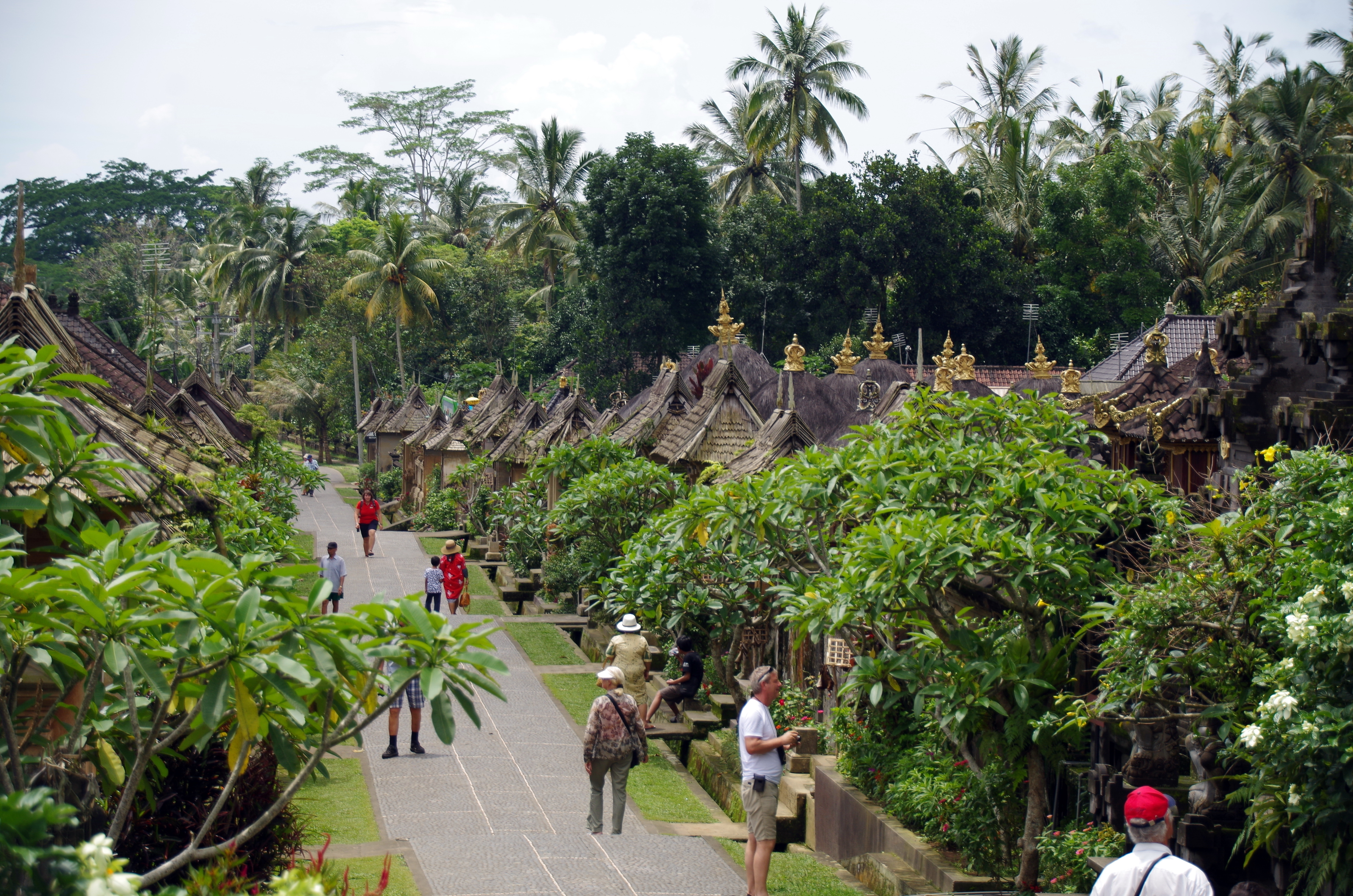
Penglipuran

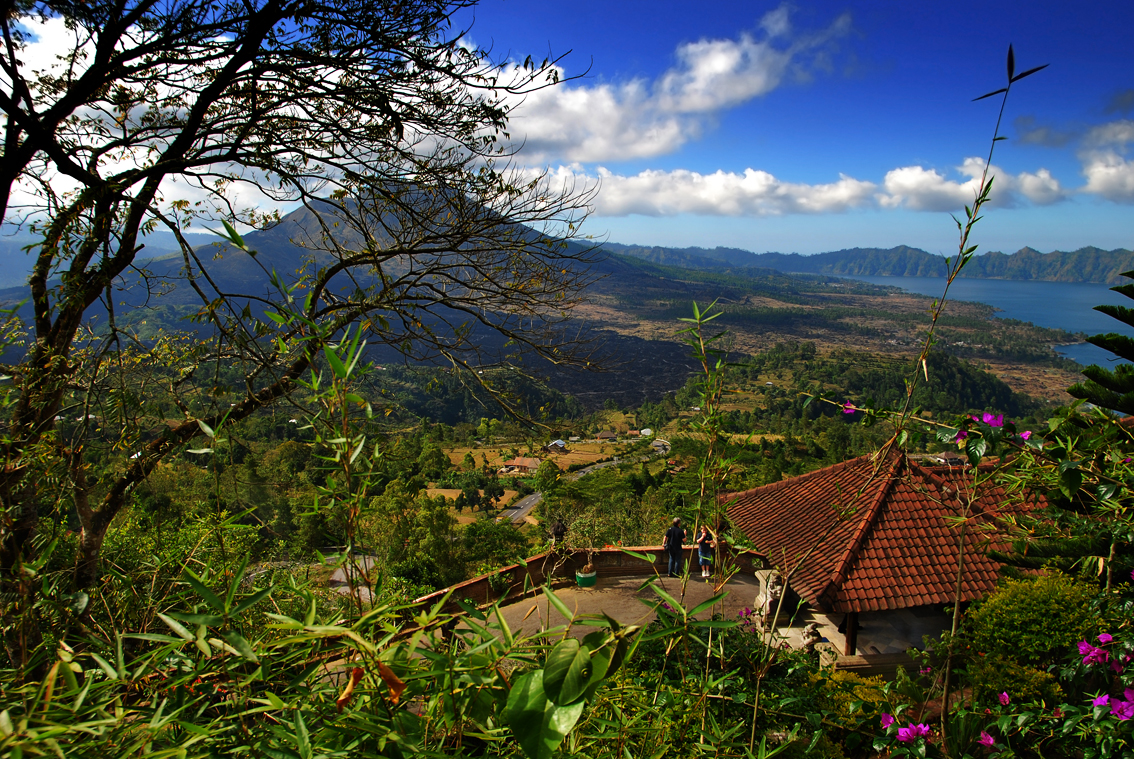
Mount Batur Caldera

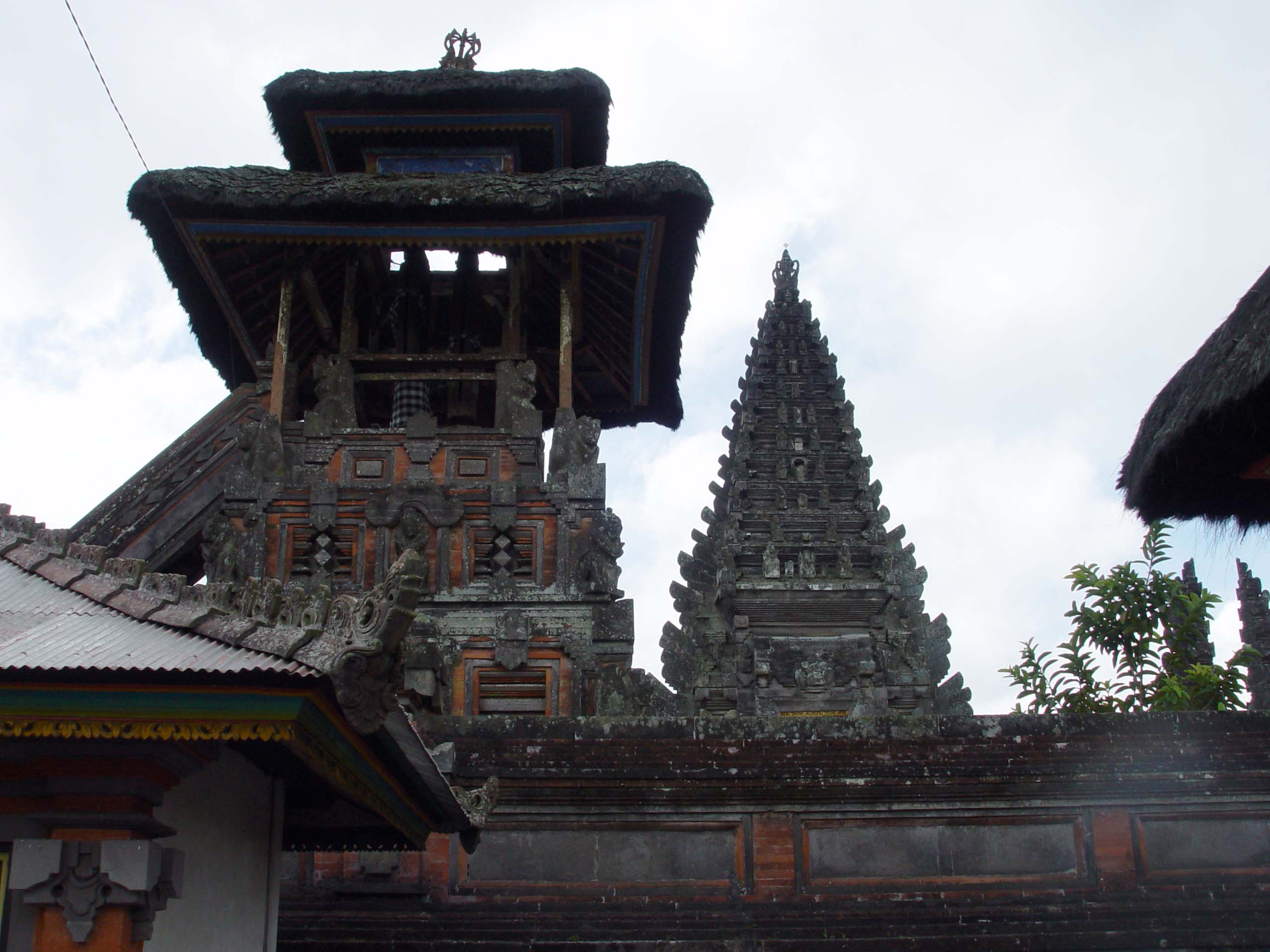
Ulun Danu Batur Temple

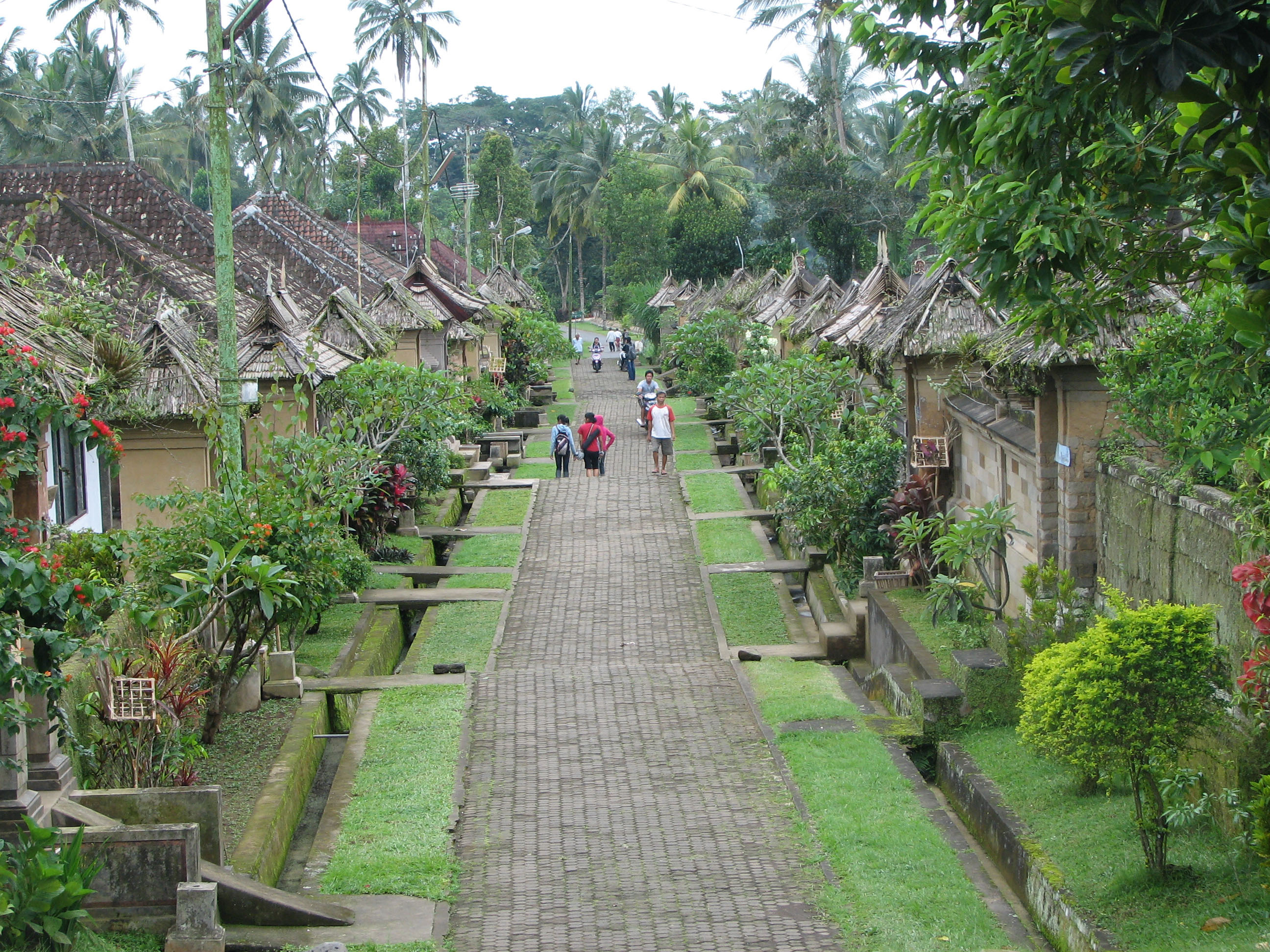
Penglipuran street

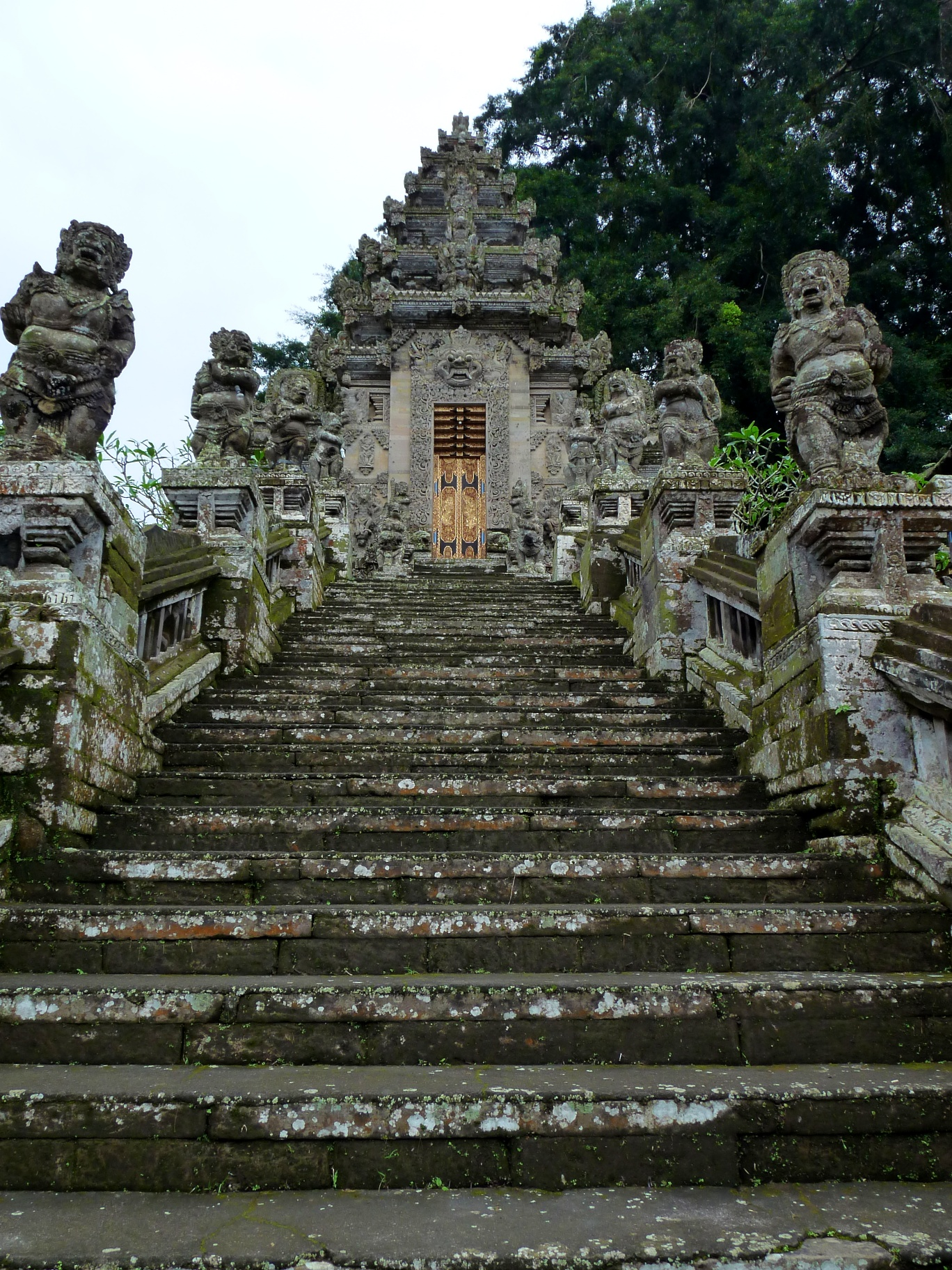
Kehen

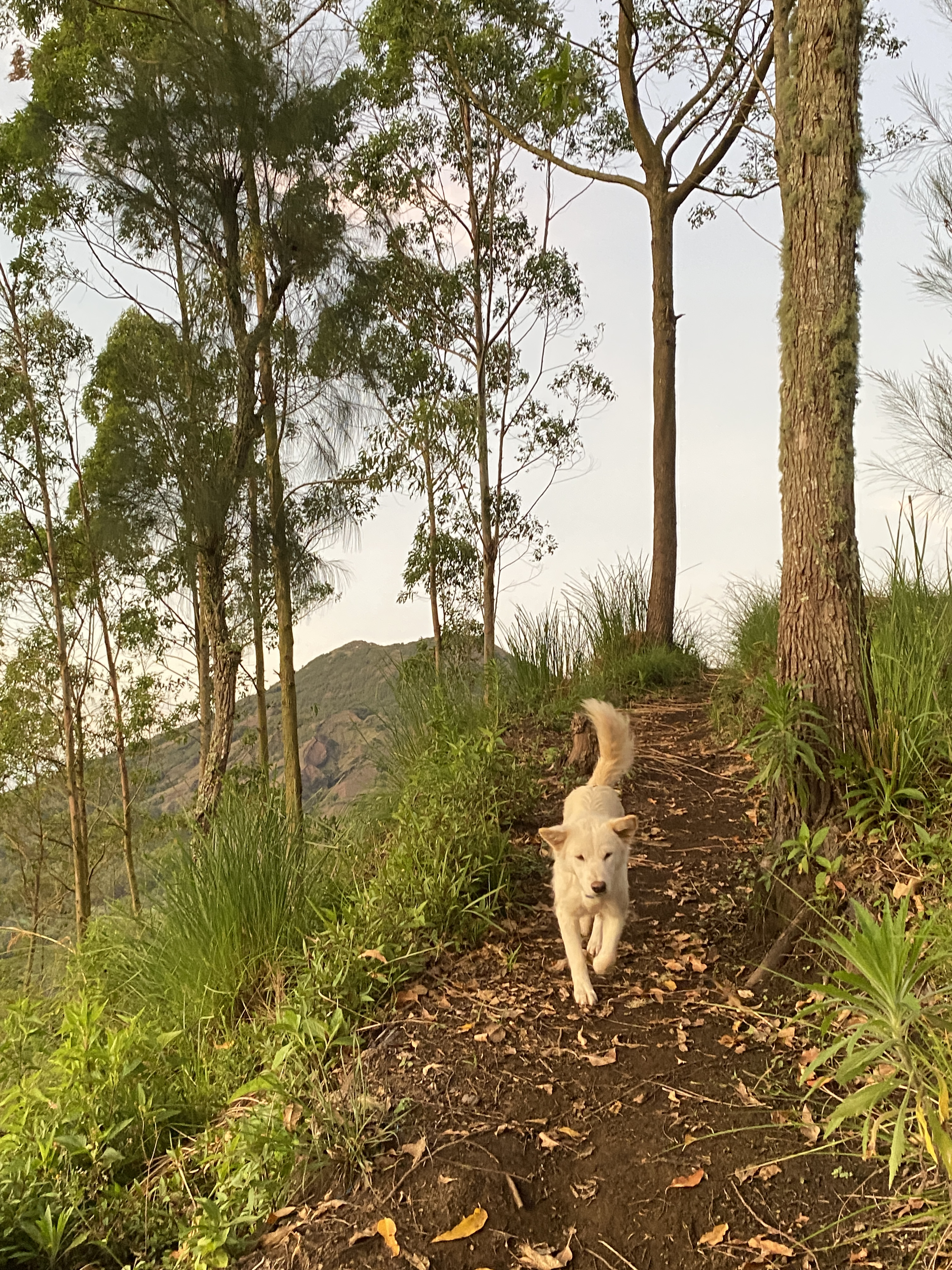
Kintamani dog on Mount Batur
