= Pura Kehen =

Balinese Hindu temple in Indonesia

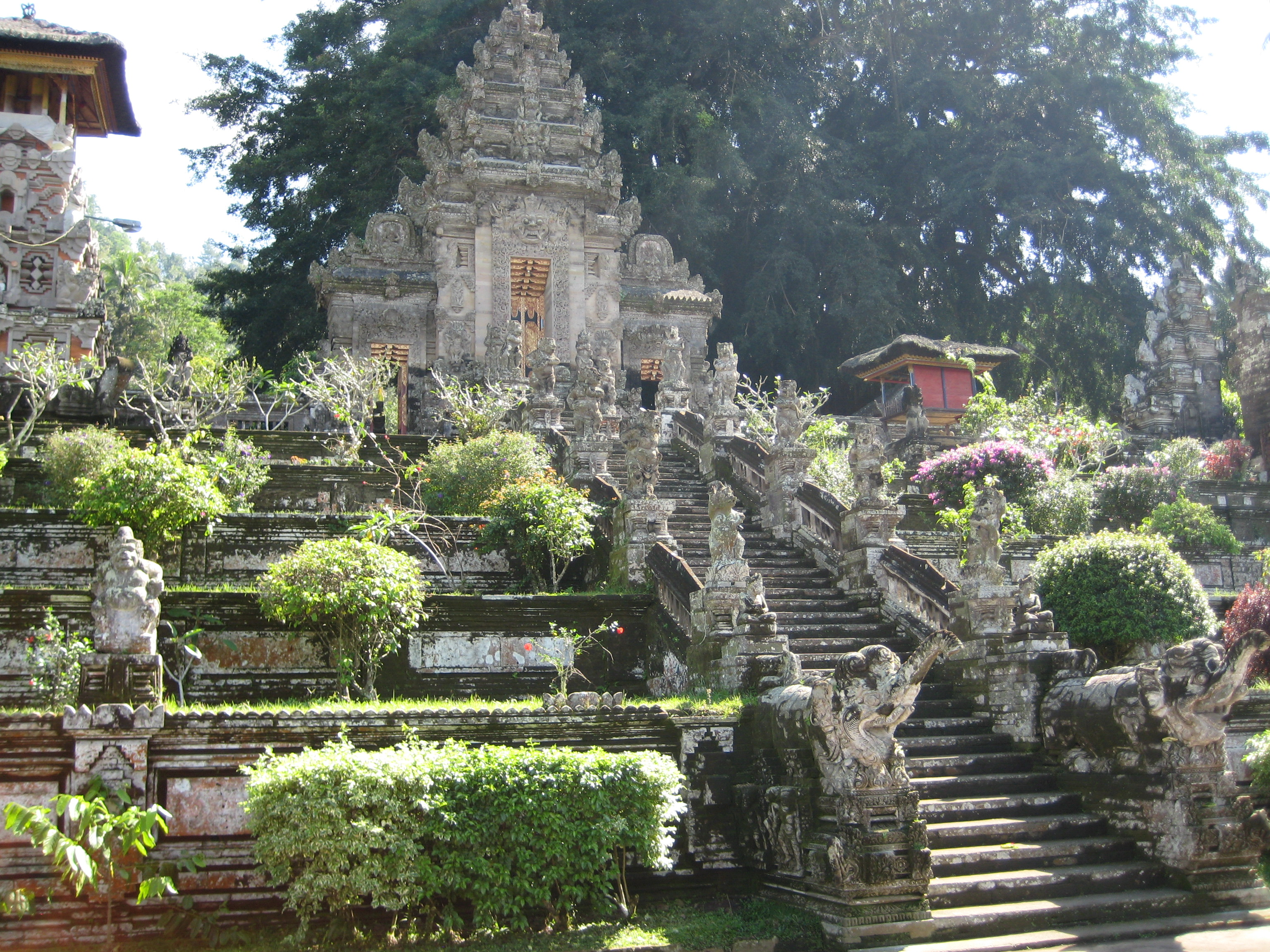
- Pura Kehen temple complex in Bangli Regency, Bali.
- Interactive map of the Pura Kehen area
- Former names: Pura Hyang Api, Pura Hyang Kehen
- Etymology: Flame

General information
- Type: Pura
- Architectural style: Balinese
- Location: Cempaga, Bangli, Bali, Indonesia
- Coordinates: 8.441827°S 115.359902°E
- Estimated completion: 13th-century

Pura Kehen is a Balinese Hindu temple located in Cempaga, Bangli Regency, Bali. The temple is set on the foot of a wooded hill, about 2 kilometres (1.2 miles) north of the town center. Established at least in the 13th-century, Pura Kehen was the royal temple of the Bangli Kingdom, now the Regency of Bangli.

== History ==
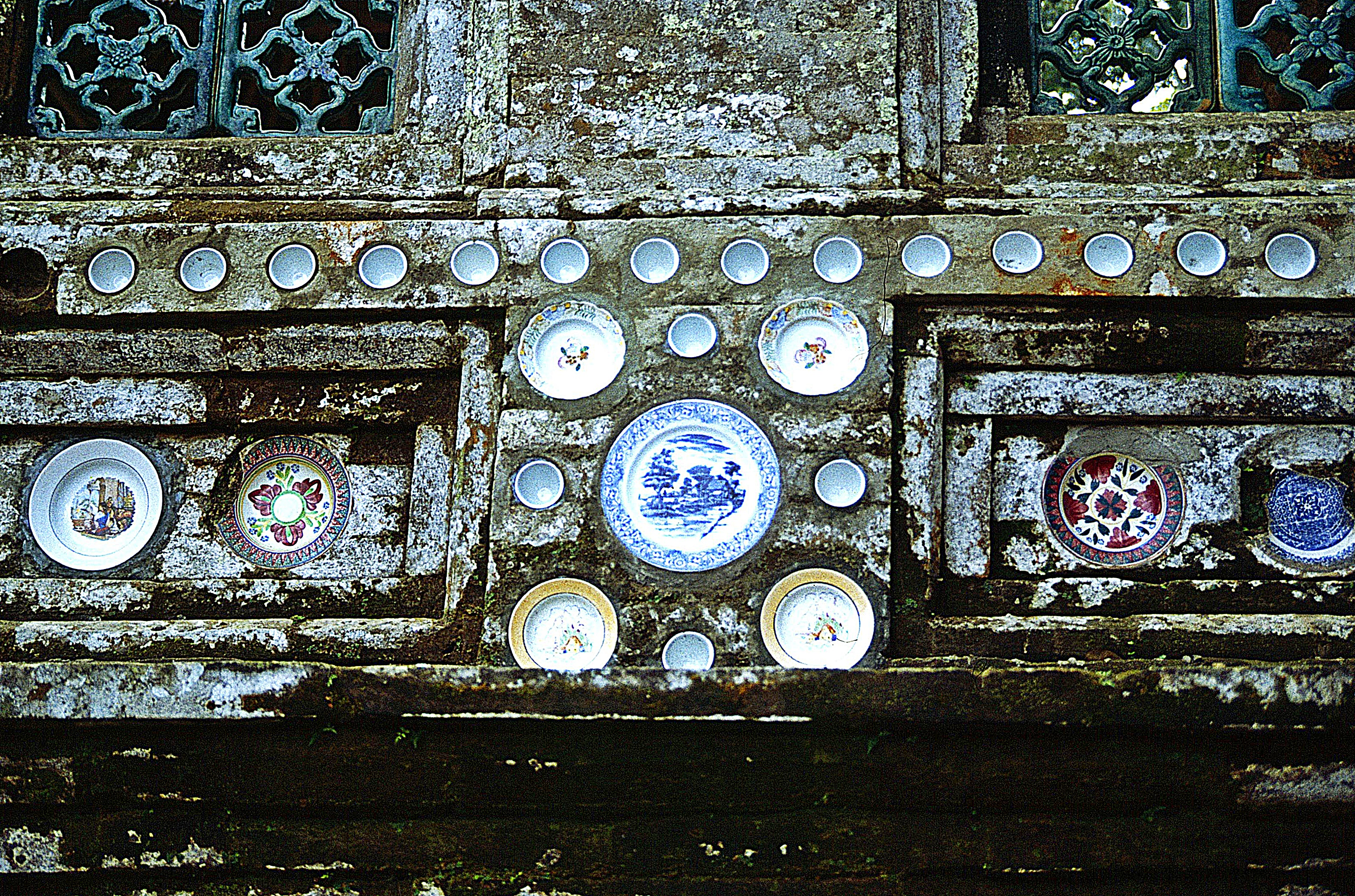
Chinese porcelains featured on the walls of Pura Kehen.

Pura Kehen was the main temple of the Bangli Regency. Bangli Regency was formerly the center of a kingdom known under the same name. The Bangli Kingdom was one of the nine kingdoms of Bali. The name Bangli derives from bang giri, meaning "red forest" or "red mountain." The Regency of Bangli was founded by the Gelgel Kingdom of the Majapahit dynasty.

Pura Kehen was mentioned three times in three copper inscriptions dated from the late 9th century, the early 11th century, and the 13th century. The copper inscriptions mentioned the temple under different names. In the late 9th-century inscription, the temple was mentioned as Hyang Api ("god of fire) by the Brahmans who maintain the temple. In the second inscription dating to the early 11th-century, the temple was named Hyang Kehen; the word Kehen is derived from the Balinese word keren which means "flame." In this period, the Pura Hyang Kehen was the official temple where oath ceremonies took place for royal officials. In such ceremonies, those who are proven unfaithful will be subjected to the terrible sapata ("curse") to him, his families, and his descendants. The oath ceremony was performed in front of the figure of Hyang Api or Hyang Kehen, the god of fire Agni. A vessel known as bejana sarpantaka was used for such performance. This vessel, which is decorated with four serpents winding around the vessel, was kept in an enclosed pavilion to the east of the main shrine of Pura Kehen.

The temple was named Pura Kehen in the 13th-century inscription. All inscriptions mentioned the association of Pura Kehen with the village of Bangli.

== Temple layout ==
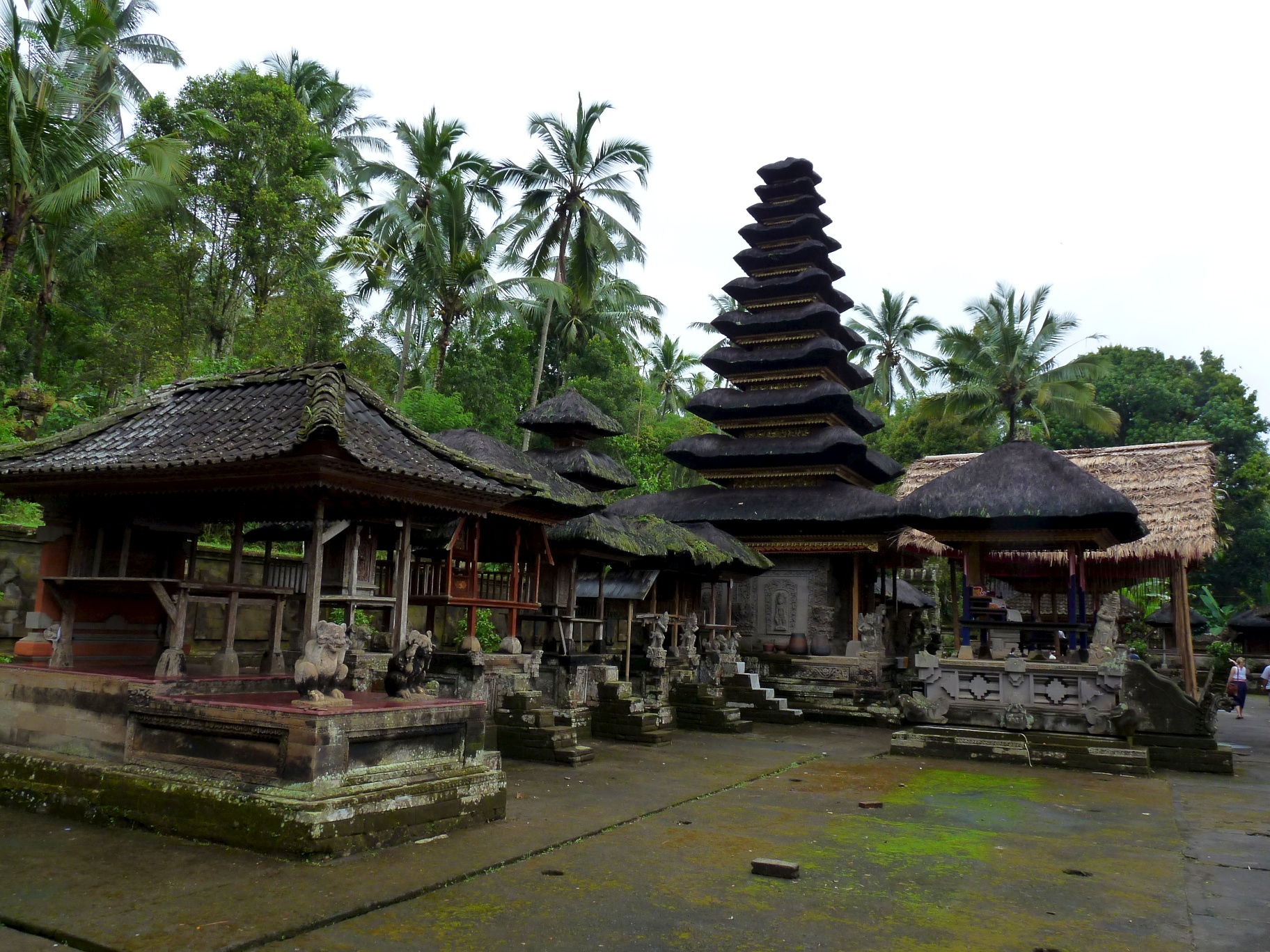
The innermost sanctum (jero) of Pura Kehen featuring the 11-tiers meru tower dedicated to the main god and patron of the temple.

Pura Kehen temple compound is built over a hilly outcrop. The temple is aligned north-south, with the north part being the highest part of the temple. It is divided into three areas: the outer sanctum of the temple (jaba pisan or nistaning mandala), the middle sanctum (jaba tengah or madya mandala), and the inner main sanctum (jero or utamaning mandala).

Three sets of stairs lead visitors to the outer sanctum of the temple from the street. The landscape is terraced and is decorated with stone statues representing characters from the Indian epic Ramayana. Three gateways mark the entrance into the outer sanctum (jaba pisan). The central gateways or portal is in the form of paduraksa, which is unusual since paduraksa normally used to mark entrance into the inner main sanctum.

The outer sanctum (jaba pisan) features a banyan tree that is at least 400 years old. The enormous banyan tree features a monk's cell high up in the branches. The tree is considered sacred by the people of Bangli. It is believed that if a branch of the tree broke, a disaster (grubug) would follow, usually the death of a person. The location of the broken branch indicates the person that would die; if a branch is broken on the kaja-kangin (northeast) side, a king will die; if it is broken on the kaja-kauh (northwest) side, a brahmin will die; the kelod-kangin and the kelod-kauh means that a common people will die. Several bale (Balinese pavilions) located in the outer sanctum are the bale gong ("gong pavilion") where the gamelans are stored.

The middle sanctum (jaba tengah) is accessed via a candi bentar gateway. The middle sanctum acts as a transitional area between the outer sanctum and the inner sanctum. Several shrines (pelinggih) are located in the middle sanctum. The other southwest side of the middle sanctum, the perantenan area, is used as a place to prepare ceremonial offerings.

The uppermost inner sanctum (jero) is the most sacred courtyard of the Balinese temple. The courtyard features an 11-tiered meru tower, the most sacred shrine of the Pura Kehen dedicated to the God that protects the temple. A padmasana lotus shrine is also located in this courtyard, dedicated to the highest Hindu Trimurti of Brahma, Shiva and Vishnu. Several other shrines surround the main meru tower, dedicated to the gods of the local geography, for example, the mountain gods. Porcelain plates decorate the wall below the inner sanctum. Some of these depict a scene of rural England, with a watermill and a coach drawn by four horses.

== Rituals ==
The major Balinese feast of Pagerwesi was held once every six months at the full moon of the Rabu Kliwon Wuku Sinta day to honor Hyang Widhi and His manifestations.

Another major feast, the Ngusaba Dewa or Karya Agung Bhatara Turun Kabeh, is held on Purnama Kalima (early November) on the Saniscara Pon Wuku Sinta day.

Other smaller feasts held at Pura Kehen are ceremonies to honor other gods, for example, Saraswati, Ulian Sugimanik, Purnama, Tilem, Kajeng Kliwon, and Buda Kliwon.

== See also ==
- Balinese temple

== Cited works ==
- Auger, Timothy, ed. (2001). Bali & Lombok. Eyewitness Travel Guides. London: Dorling Kindersley. ISBN 0751368709.
- Dewi, A.A. Putri Candra Purnama; Sumarjiana, I Ketut Laba (2014). "Persepsi Masyarakat di Balik Mitos Pohon Beringin di Pura Kehen Desa Adat Cempaga, Kecamatan Bangli, Kabupaten Bangli". Jurnal Santiaji Pendidikan. 4 (1). ISSN 2087-9016.
- Stuart-Fox, David (1999). Fox, James J. (ed.). Religion and Ritual: Balinese Hindu Temples. Indonesian Heritage. Singapore: Archipelago Press. ISBN 9813018585.
- Mercury, Muhammad Fredey (20 May 2017). "Aura Magis Pura Kehen, Tempat Penyumpahan Pejabat Kerajaan, Tak Setia akan Kena Kutukan Ini". Tribunnews.com.
- Ni Luh Sri Karmi Asri (2013). "Pura Kehen di Desa Pakraman Cempaga, Bangli, Bali (Sejarah Struktur dan Fungsinya Sebagai Sumber Belajar Sejarah)" [Pura Kehen in Desa Pakraman Cempaga, Bangli, Bali (The History of Structure and Function)]. Widya Winayata: Jurnal Pendidikan Sejarah (in Indonesian). 1 (1): 5.
- Suarsana, Komang (2003). Pura Kehen Pemersatu Krama Bangli [Pura Kehen Unifying Krama Bangli] (in Indonesian). London: Karya Bhatara Turun Kabeh Pura Kehen Bangli.
