= Mark Tate =

American architect and artist (born 1959)

Mark Allen Tate
- Born: August 12, 1959 (age 67); Oklahoma City, Oklahoma
- Education: Arizona State University
- Occupation: Architect
- Spouse: Lisa Cressy (m. 1996)
- Children: 9
- Website: www.tate-studio.com

Mark Allen Tate (born 1959 Oklahoma, United States) is an American architect and artist. Tate is the owner and principal of Tate Studio Architects, an architecture firm established in 2007 in Cave Creek, Arizona.

== Early life and education ==
Tate was born in Oklahoma City, Oklahoma. He grew up between Oklahoma and Texas where most everyone in his family had a farm. He spent his boyhood days at his grandfather's farm in Chandler, Oklahoma, and then later, Aitkin, Minnesota until his grandfather's death in 1987.

At 16, Tate developed an interest in jewelry making, heavily influenced by American artist of indigenous Hopi descent, Charles Loloma. Tate began selling his drawings and jewelry pieces at Oklahoma art shows and then at the Scottsdale Fifth Avenue stores in Scottsdale, Arizona, where his family later relocated.

After graduating from Putnam City High School in Oklahoma City, Oklahoma in 1977, Tate and his family relocated to Phoenix, Arizona. Tate first attended Southwestern Bible College and then Scottsdale Community College to study art. In 1979, he transferred to Arizona State University where he studied sculpture with Ben Goo. As a college senior and a father to three (he would go on to have nine children), however, Tate left his studies to support his family, returning decades later to graduate with a BFA degree in sculpture in 2022.

== Career and recognition ==
Tate's architectural career began in 1981 when he worked for Architectural Alliance under the guidance of architect Mike Munninger. He became licensed as an architect in Arizona in 1991 and several subsequent states thereafter: Texas (2009), Colorado (2010), Utah (2020), and Idaho (2021).

In 1993, Tate joined Jones Studio where he met his wife, Lisa Tate, who later founded Full Circle Custom Homes (2012). After leaving Jones Studio in 1994, Tate and Lisa opened the wood shop, Red River Studios where they built custom furniture and cabinetry until 2000 when they closed the shop. At that time, Tate joined Douglas Fredrikson Architects where he worked with award-winning architect Douglas Frederikson to design golf clubhouses and community center facilities in the Southwest, among other things.

In 2007, Tate established Tate Studio Architects in Cave Creek, Arizona and shifted his focus to primarily residential design. The firm, owned and operated by Tate, had a staff of eight as of 2023. Today, Tate is known for designing homes that harmonize with the external environment, unique to each owner. In all of his work, he aims to "bring the outside in."

According to Images Arizona, "Clean, modernist lines; minimalist natural materials; and open, airy rooms that blend seamlessly with outdoor spaces are hallmarks of his work. Stacked stone, steel and concrete are softened by warm wood accents and walls of windows that overlook the desert landscape and distant mountain vistas. Expansive hardscapes, manicured gardens and azure pools add the perfect finishing touches. Tate refers to the overall effect as 'living in the view.'"

Given his background in art and sculpture, Tate has been referred to as “a sculptor of modern architecture in the desert.”

In 2011, Tate was awarded the first of several Pacific Coast Builders Conference Gold Nugget Merit Awards for his work in Scottsdale, Arizona. The Gold Nugget Merit Award is selected by a panel of top industry experts from hundreds of entries. Winners selected are believed to be those who showcase the most exciting trends in residential design, planning and building. Tate has since been awarded six Gold Nugget Merit Awards as of 2024 for various residences around the American Southwest. In 2021, Tate was named a Master of the Southwest by Phoenix Home & Garden and a “Design Icon – Architect” by Sources for Design magazine.

In 2020, Tate opened the Tate Studio Cave Creek Art Gallery at the Tate Studio offices.

== Major works ==
- 2011 Pass Residence, Scottsdale, Arizona, United States
- 2011 Sefcovic Residence, Scottsdale, Arizona, United States
- 2015 Kim Residence, Scottsdale, Arizona, United States
- 2017 Riley Residence, Scottsdale, Arizona, United States
- 2017 Silversmith Residence, Scottsdale, Arizona, United States
- 2017 Wayne Residence, Scottsdale, Arizona, United States
- 2018 Hoffman – Residence – Lee Residence, Scottsdale, Arizona, United States
- 2018 Norman Residence, Scottsdale, Arizona, United States
- 2019 Sill Residence, Flagstaff, Arizona, United States
- 2023 Andrus Residence, Scottsdale, Arizona, United States
- 2024 SB Residence, Scottsdale, Arizona, United States
