= Home & Garden =

Home and Garden may refer to:

- Residential garden, a garden at a residence or home
- Arlington Antebellum Home & Gardens, plantation house and gardens in Birmingham, Alabama
- Luther Burbank Home and Gardens, park in Santa Rosa, California
- Phoenix Home & Garden, magazine based in Phoenix, Arizona
- Homes & Gardens, magazine based in UK
- House & Garden (magazine), a lifestyle magazine

== See also ==
- Better Homes and Gardens (disambiguation)
- HGTV (Home & Garden Television)
- Home garden (disambiguation)
- House & Garden (disambiguation)
- Natural Home and Garden, magazine
