= Better Homes and Gardens =

Better Homes and Gardens may refer to:

- Better Homes and Gardens (magazine), an American magazine
- Better Homes and Gardens (TV program), an Australian television series
- Better Homes and Gardens Real Estate, an international real estate brokerage business
- Better Homes and Gardens Best New Product Awards, a division of the Best New Product Awards

== See also ==
- Home & Garden (disambiguation)
- BHG (disambiguation)
