= Home garden =

Home garden or homegarden may refer to:

- The yard areas surrounding a house:
  - Residential garden
  - Back garden
  - Front garden
- Forest garden
  - Pekarangan, an Indonesian form of forest-gardening in yards

== Places ==
- Home Garden, California
- Home Gardens, California

== See also ==
- Home & Garden (disambiguation)
