= Pekarangan =

Type of home garden developed in Indonesia

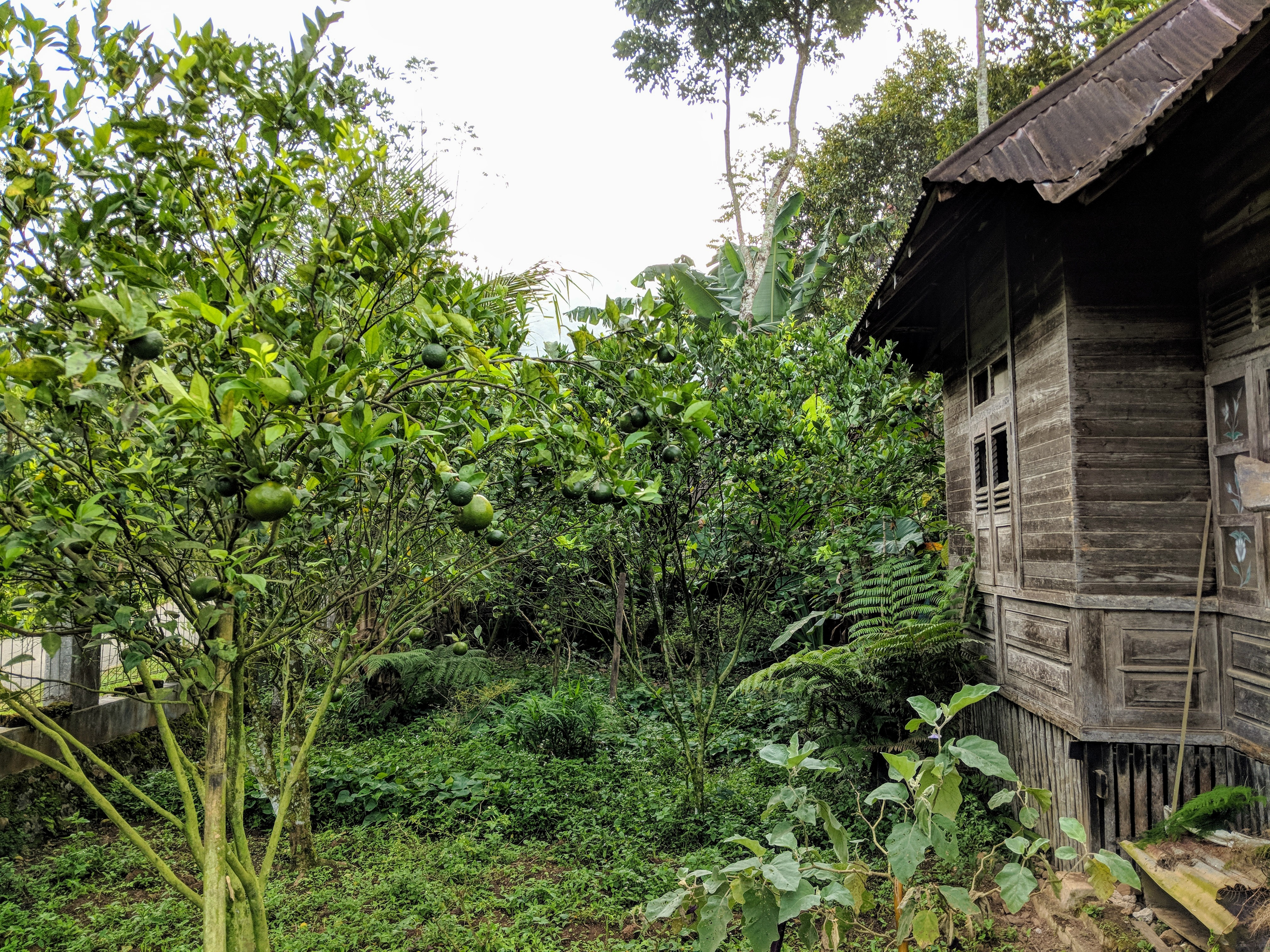
A rural pekarangan in Agam, West Sumatra

Pekarangan (Indonesian pronunciation: [pə'karaŋan]) is a type of tropical home garden developed in Indonesia, mainly in Java. In addition to plants, pekarangans may contain animals (including farmed fish, ruminants, poultry, and wild animals) and structures such as pens and bird cages. The gardens provide food, income, and ornamental plants, while also supporting social interaction, food sharing, cultural ceremonies, and religious practices. Some pekarangans are made, maintained, and spatially arranged according to local values. The first mention of pekarangan is found in a Javanese chronicle that was written in 860 AD. In 2010, around 103,000 square kilometers (40,000 sq mi) of Indonesian land were used for gardens of this sort.

The sustainability and social roles of pekarangans have been threatened by commercialization of its crops, mass urbanization, and land fragmentation. These factors led to a loss of plant diversity within the gardens, which consequently reduces the gardens' sustainability. The reduced sustainability of the gardens plays a part in causing problems such as pest outbreaks and a rise in household debts.

Throughout the history of Java, pekarangans have been of little interest to its rulers that have ruled the island due to their minimal susceptibility to agricultural tax-in-kind. In the 2010s, they have gained the attention of the Indonesian government through P2KP (Percepatan Penganekaragaman Konsumsi Pangan), a program focused on urban and peri-urban areas that aims to optimize production with a sustainable approach.

== Definition ==
In Indonesian, pekarangan can be translated as "land that surrounds a house", "a house's yard", or "plotted land for house construction". However, the term is widely used in scientific literature, specifically in agroforestry and environmental topics, to mean "home gardens". The word pekarangan may be derived from karang, which means "perennial crops".

Scholars offer various definitions of the term "pekarangan". According to Sajogyo, it is a plot adjacent to a house, cultivated on a part-time basis. Totok Mardikanto and Sri Sutami define it as a plot surrounding a house; most of its kind are fenced, and usually planted with dense plants with various annual and perennial plants for daily and commercial use. Euis Novitasari considers "pekarangan" to be a form of land use: a system of small-scale additional food production by members and a family, that is also an ecosystem with a densely layered canopy. Further, she describes it as having a clear boundary and containing elements such as the owner's house, a kitchen, a pen, and fences. Simatupang and Suryana argue that it is hard to define "pekarangan" clearly, since its role can vary as a form of farmland to a homestead plot. Rahu et al. interpret "pekarangan" as, specifically, a Javanese home garden.

== Elements ==
=== Plants ===
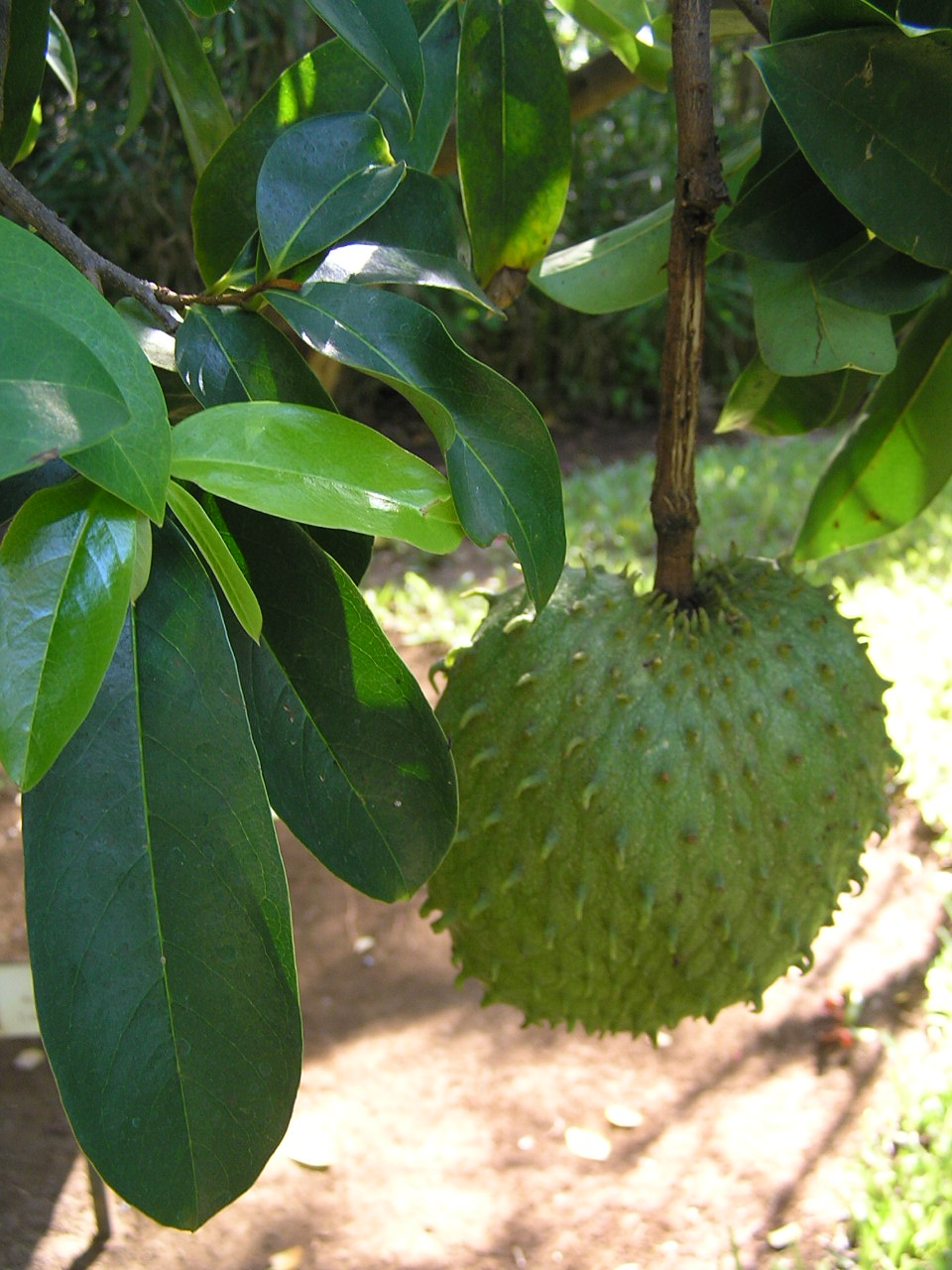
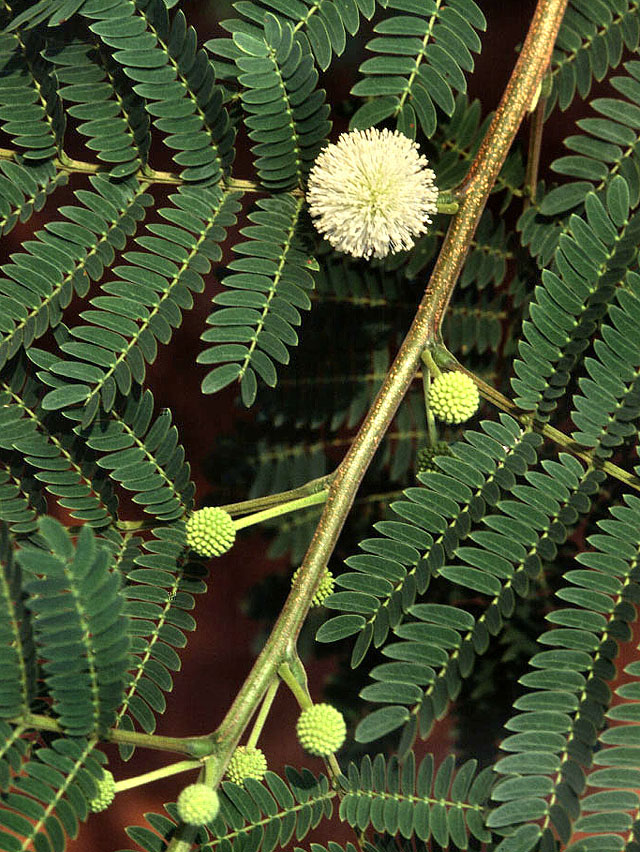
Soursop and white leadtree, some of the plants that are specifically planted in rural pekarangans

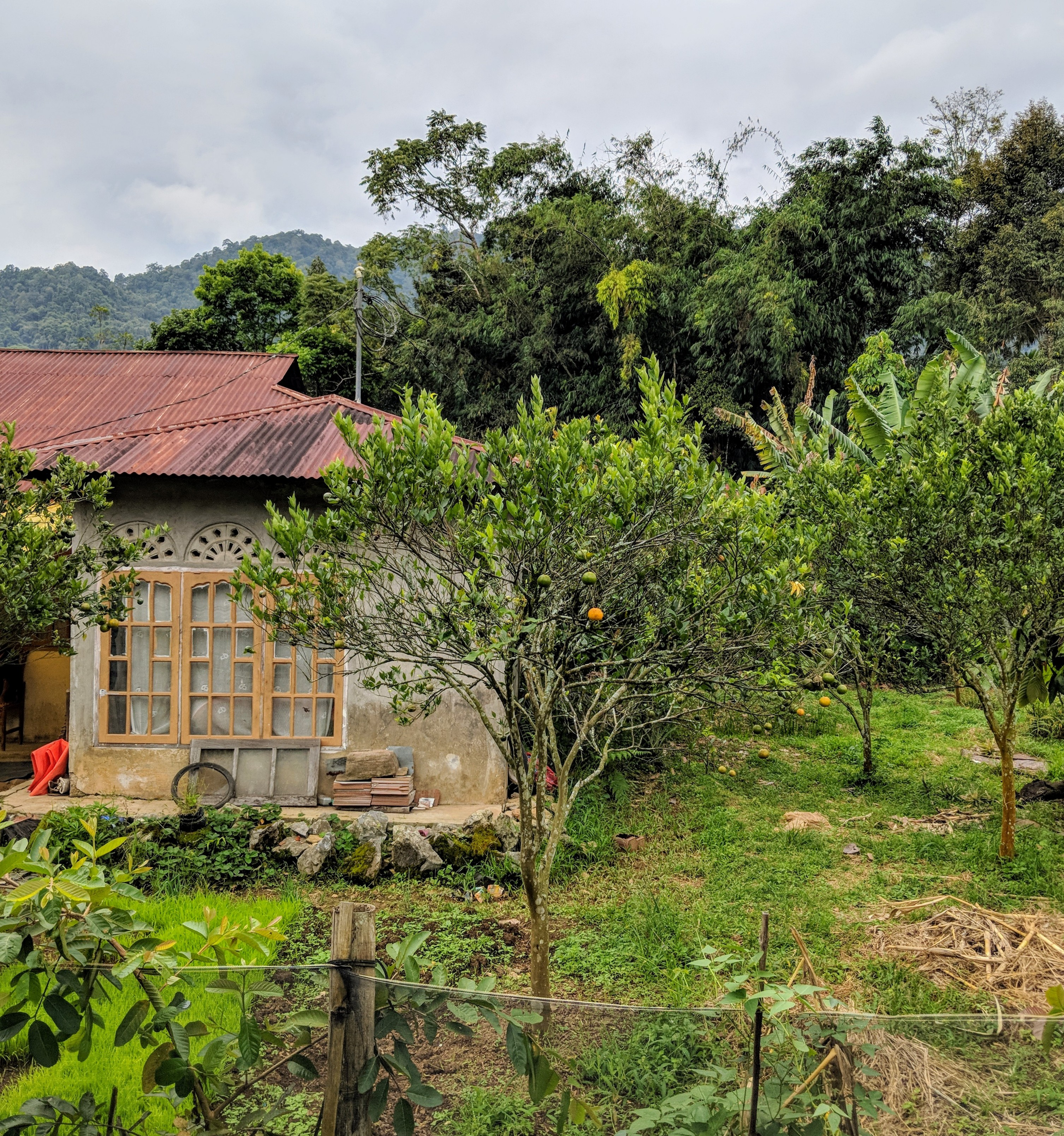
Orange trees (front) and banana plants (back) in a pekarangan

A pekarangan generally consists of annual and perennial plants combined; they can be harvested daily or seasonally. Some perennials offer harvests all year round, including melinjo (Gnetum gnemon) for its edible leaves, and others such as coconut, jackfruit, banana, and salak for their fruits. Other perennials' fruiting periods are limited: for example, the semarang guava (Syzygium aqueum) fruits from April to June, mangoes fruit during July and August, and durians (Durio zibethinus) from June to September. Perennials are more common than annuals in pekarangans throughout regions where rice fields account for more than 40 percent of land area; elsewhere the situation is reversed, and annuals are more common, though if labor is in short supply, perennials are again favored. Trees are one of the most common components of home gardens, contributing to the image of Indonesian countryside with houses less visible than the "dense, forest mimics" of pekarangans.

In Sundanese pekarangans, ornamental plants tend to be placed in front of the house, while crops such as cloves, oranges, and mangoes are frequently planted in the front yard for the homeowners to see. Starchy crops, medicinal plants, and cash crops are more frequent in the front and back plots, and less in the side plots. Coffee plants might be used as a hedge in the side and back yards; ornamental plants might have a similar function in front yards. Vegetables are habitually grown in front and side areas to be exposed to light, as tall trees are rare in those areas. Trees with large canopies might be planted in front yards, providing shade for children. Coconuts, fruit trees, and tall trees whose woods are used for construction are planted in back gardens to avoid damage to the house when any of them falls due to a storm. Most plants propagate without intentional human intervention—this natural process is called janteun ku anjeun in Sundanese—due to seed scattering by birds, mammals, or humans after they eat. Because of this, no clear spatial arrangement is found in Sundanese back gardens.

Plants in Javanese and Sundanese pekarangans—especially annual plants grown in the dry season (e.g. eggplants)—are habitually grown near water sources such as fish ponds, open sewage ditches, and wells. Plants that need high levels of nutrients, such as banana, mango, jackfruit, and other fruit plants, are planted close to garbage dumps. Meanwhile, crops frequently harvested for cooking, such as chili peppers, lengkuas, lemongrass, and tomatoes, are planted near the kitchen.

Pekarangans in Borneo contain fewer exotic species than pekarangans in other regions of Indonesia. Many of their plants are native to Borneo. Among the plants in Bornean pekarangans that are considered economically and ecologically crucial are durians (Durio zibethinus, Durio kutejensis), jackfruits (Artocarpus heterophyllus), langsat (Lansium domesticum), and rambutan (Nephelium lappaceum).

=== Animals ===
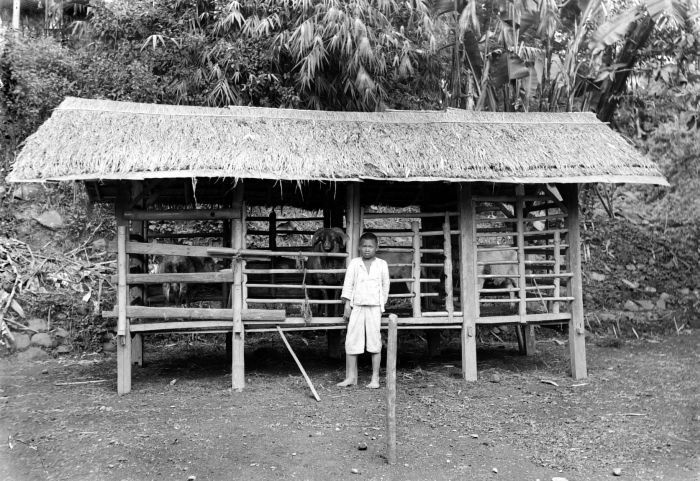
A household's goat pen in the colonial Dutch East Indies, early 20th century

Some owners of pekarangans keep livestock and poultry (traditionally chickens, goats, and sheep), in a household pen. Animals are often allowed to roam around the gardens, village areas, and traditional markets to find food on their own. They are penned at night and are usually given additional feed. Other common domestic animals kept in pekarangans are fishes in ponds and songbirds (e.g. zebra dove, Geopelia striata), which are kept in cages on bamboo poles. The economic status of pekarangan owners plays a role in livestock ownership; lower-class owners tend to own several chickens whereas middle-class owners might have a goat or a sheep, and wealthier owners may own several cows or water buffaloes. Livestock manure acts as an organic fertilizer for the gardens via composting, and sometimes a nutritional source for pond fishes.

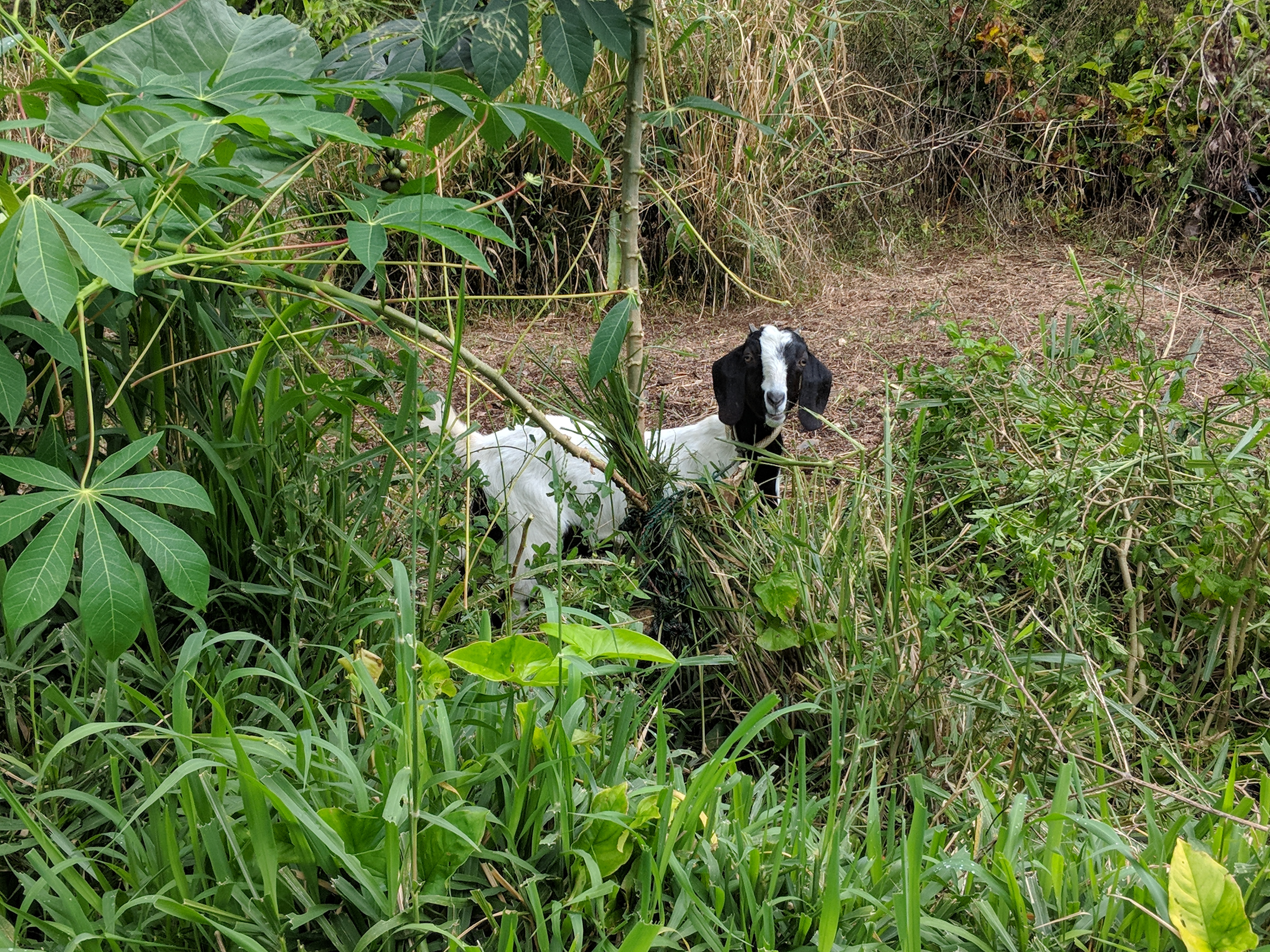
Some Indonesians keep farm animals, such as goats, in their pekarangans.

Productive fish ponds are common in Sundanese traditional pekarangans. The fishes are fed with kitchen waste supplemented by human and animal waste, coming from toilets and horse stables above these types of ponds. However, pens for other animals are not built above the ponds, and their waste is composted instead.

The gardens may have a high diversity of soil fauna. According to Widyastuti, the soil fauna diversity in the gardens is suggested to be higher than that of teak forests. The diversity might be caused by the vegetation, which protects soil fauna from direct sunshine, especially in the dry season. Otto Soemarwoto and Gordon Conway wrote that the gardens are also believed to be "a good habitat" for reptiles and amphibians.

Researchers found opposing findings on the conservation of wild birds in pekarangans. A high diversity of birds, including legally protected species, within the gardens were recorded in a West Java research while another study in Jambi suggests individual pekarangans are not effective as a means to conserve bird communities. This is because of the edge effects of their irregular shapes, their frequent disturbance, and their proximity to roads and houses. The pekarangans used for the Jambi study had unusually low levels of plant diversity, which may account for the results. Despite this, the gardens apparently still attract birds due to their food resources.

== Ecology ==
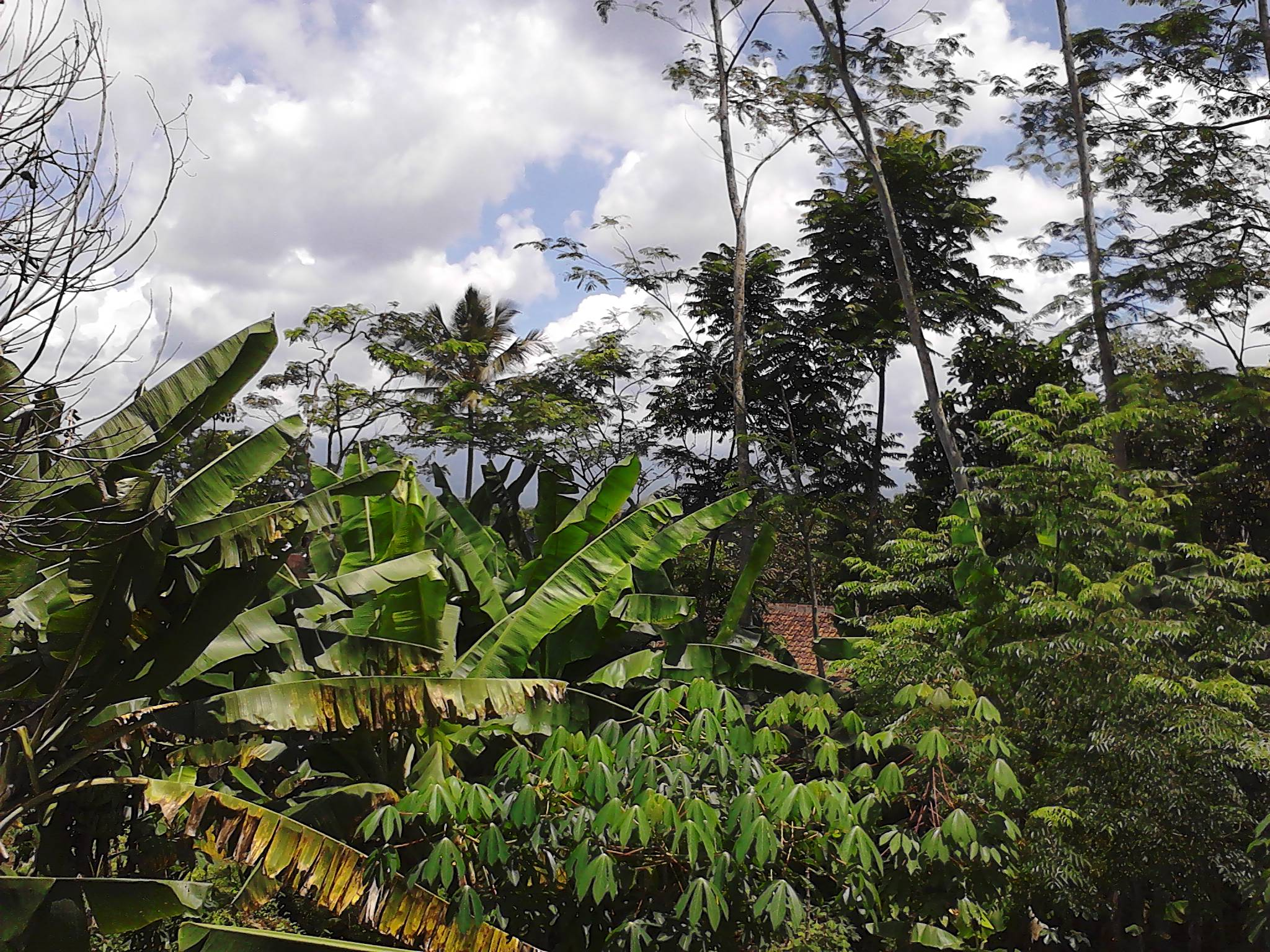
Canopy structure of a rural pekarangan

Plant diversity in pekarangans arises from complex interactions between several factors that are not fully understood. These include environmental stability, the tropical climate that is favorable to plant growth, and their close proximity to the owners' domestic activities. Other natural factors are size, temperature decrease due to elevation, precipitation, and climatic events like El Niño. Anthropological factors include individual preferences and market proximity.

The diversity of plants aids individual plants to adapt to a changing environment, helping them survive in the long term. The biodiversity in the multi-layered system also helps to optimize solar energy and carbon harvesting, cool the domestic climate, protect the soil from erosion, and accommodate habitats for wild plants and animals. The genetic diversity also gives protection from the effects of pests and diseases. As an example, the abundance of insectivorous birds in the gardens helps control pests, helping the garden remain productive.

While on per individual basis pekarangans store only small amounts of carbon due to their size, on per area basis they hold an amount of carbon that is similar to primary or secondary forests, and greatly surpassing Imperata grasslands and fallow lands.

=== Natural factors ===
Plant diversity in pekarangans tends to increase as their size increases. Diversity of crop species, however, might reach a plateau in very large gardens. Larger pekarangans have a lower density of crop species because of more constant cultivation patterns. A pekarangan smaller than 100 square meters (1,100 sq ft) is insufficient for plant diversity and crop production. Some plant types, such as trees higher than 10 meters (33 ft), spice plants, and industrial crops are almost completely absent in gardens of 100 square meters (1,100 sq ft) or less. Home gardens in Java tend to be smaller; the majority of them are smaller than 200 square meters (2,200 sq ft), as suggested by a report from 2004. Meanwhile, similar gardens in other Indonesian islands tend to be larger. Their average size is estimated to be 2,500 square meters (27,000 sq ft); a few reach the size of 3 hectares (320,000 sq ft).

Pekarangans at high altitudes tend to have a smaller size, increased density of plants, and a smaller range of plant diversity. As altitude increases, temperature decreases, limiting plant diversity. Coconuts and fruit trees tend to develop better in lower-altitude pekarangans while vegetables tend to grow better at higher altitudes.

Pekarangans with better access to water—either by climate or by proximity to water resources—are able to facilitate annual crop cultivation. Those in West Java, when observed, perform better in accommodating plant diversity when the wet season occurs than in the dry season. The climatic conditions of Java enable the consistent growth of annual plants in its pekarangans, even in parts of East Java where the climate is drier.

Canopy in those gardens functions as a protection from intense raindrops. Most of their plants' heights are less than a meter, slowing down raindrops when they hit the soil. Leaf litter also helps protecting the soil against erosion. The role of plant canopies in consistently producing organic litter is believed to be more important in reducing erosion than its direct speed-reducing effects on raindrops. Nevertheless, gardens are less effective than natural forests in erosion reduction.

=== Human impact ===
Harvesting of rice—the dominant staple of Indonesia—influences the use of pekarangans in some ways. Production in the gardens decreases during rice-harvesting season but peaks during the rest of the year. Lower-income villagers benefit from the consistent productivity of starch crops in the gardens, especially in a period of food shortage pre-rice harvest or after a failed rice harvest by drought.

Settlement dynamics affect pekarangans in various ways. Expansion of settlements to new lands, caused by population growth, is the cause of the wide presence of food crops in newly made pekarangans. People who resettled via the Indonesian transmigration program might support plant diversity in the gardens in the places they migrate to. Plant species brought by internal migrants need to adapt well to the local environment.

Commercialization, fragmentation, and urbanization are major hazards to pekarangans' plant diversity. These change the organic cycles within the gardens, threatening their ecological sustainability. Commercialization requires a systemic change of crop planting. To optimize and produce more crops, a pekarangan's owner must specialize in its crops, making a small number of crops dominate the garden. Some owners turn them into monoculture gardens. Fragmentation stems from the traditional system of inheritance. Consequences from the reduction of plant diversity include the loss of canopy structures and organic litter, resulting in less protection of the gardens' soil; loss of pest-control agents, increasing the use of pesticides; loss of production stability; loss of nutrients' diversity; and the disappearance of food sharing culture. Despite urbanization's negative effect in reducing pekarangans' plant diversity, it increases the diversity of the gardens' ornamental plants.

A case study of home gardens in Napu Valley, Central Sulawesi, shows that the decrease in soil protection is caused by insufficient soil fertility management, regular weeding and waste burning, dumping waste in garbage pits instead of using it for compost, and spread of inorganic waste. The decrease of soil fertility worsens the decrease of crop diversity in the gardens.

== Uses ==
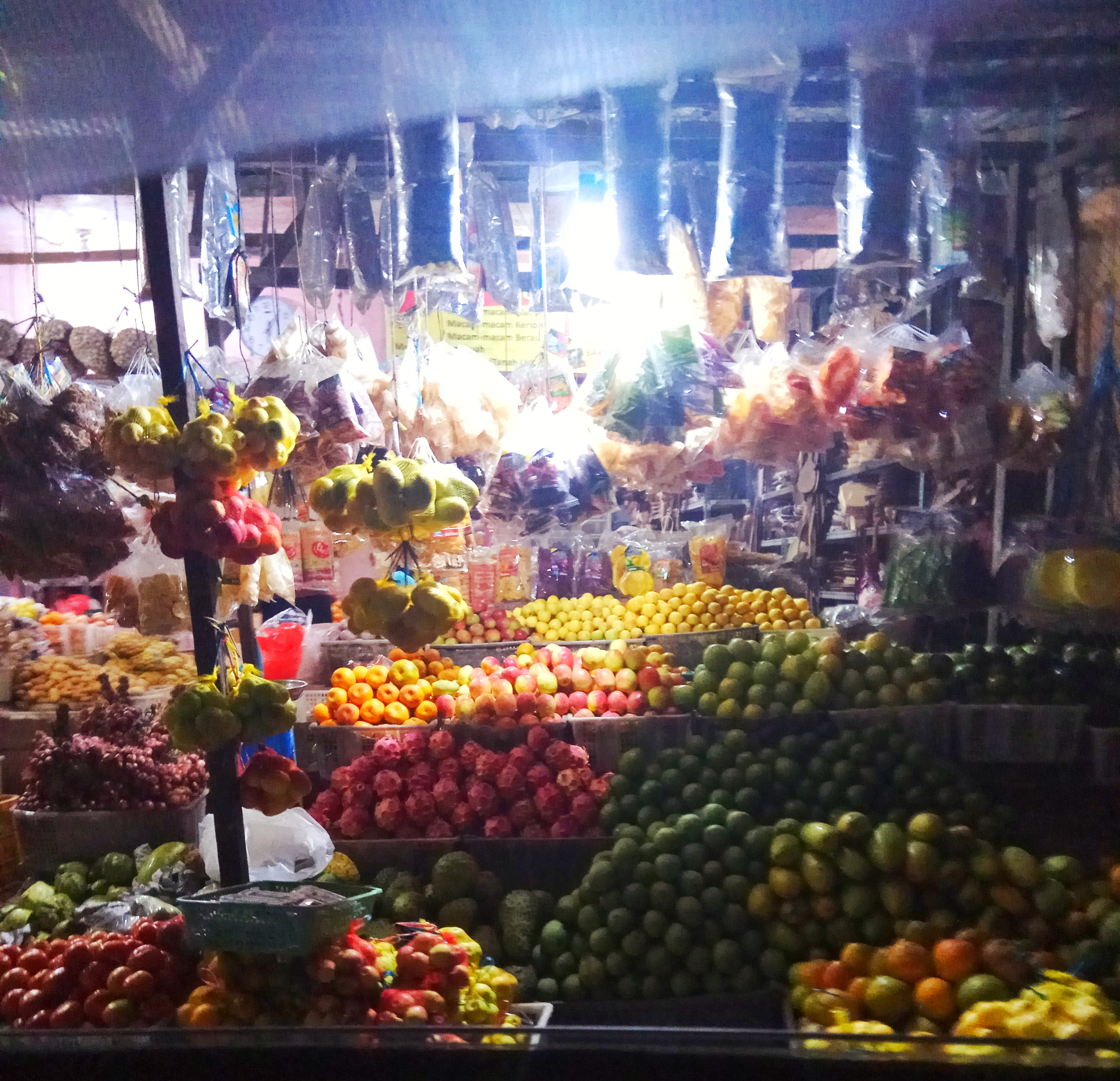
A fruit stall in an Indonesian traditional market

=== Subsistence ===
Products from pekarangans have multiple uses; for example, a coconut tree can provide food, oil, fuel, and building materials, and also be used in rituals and ceremonies. The gardens' plants are known for their products' nutritional benefits and diversity. While rice is low in vitamins A and C, products from the gardens provide an abundance of such nutrition. Pekarangans with more perennial crops tend to create more carbohydrates and proteins, and those with more annual plants tend to create more portions of vitamin A. Pekarangans also act as a source of firewood and building materials.

Lower-income families tend to consume more leafy vegetables than wealthier families, due to their consistent availability and low price. Low-income families also favor bigger use of fuel sources from the gardens. Pekarangans in villages act as subsistence systems for families rather than an income source. In areas such as Gunung Kidul, food-producing uses of the gardens are more dominant than crop fields due to soil erosion in these regions.

=== Commercial ===
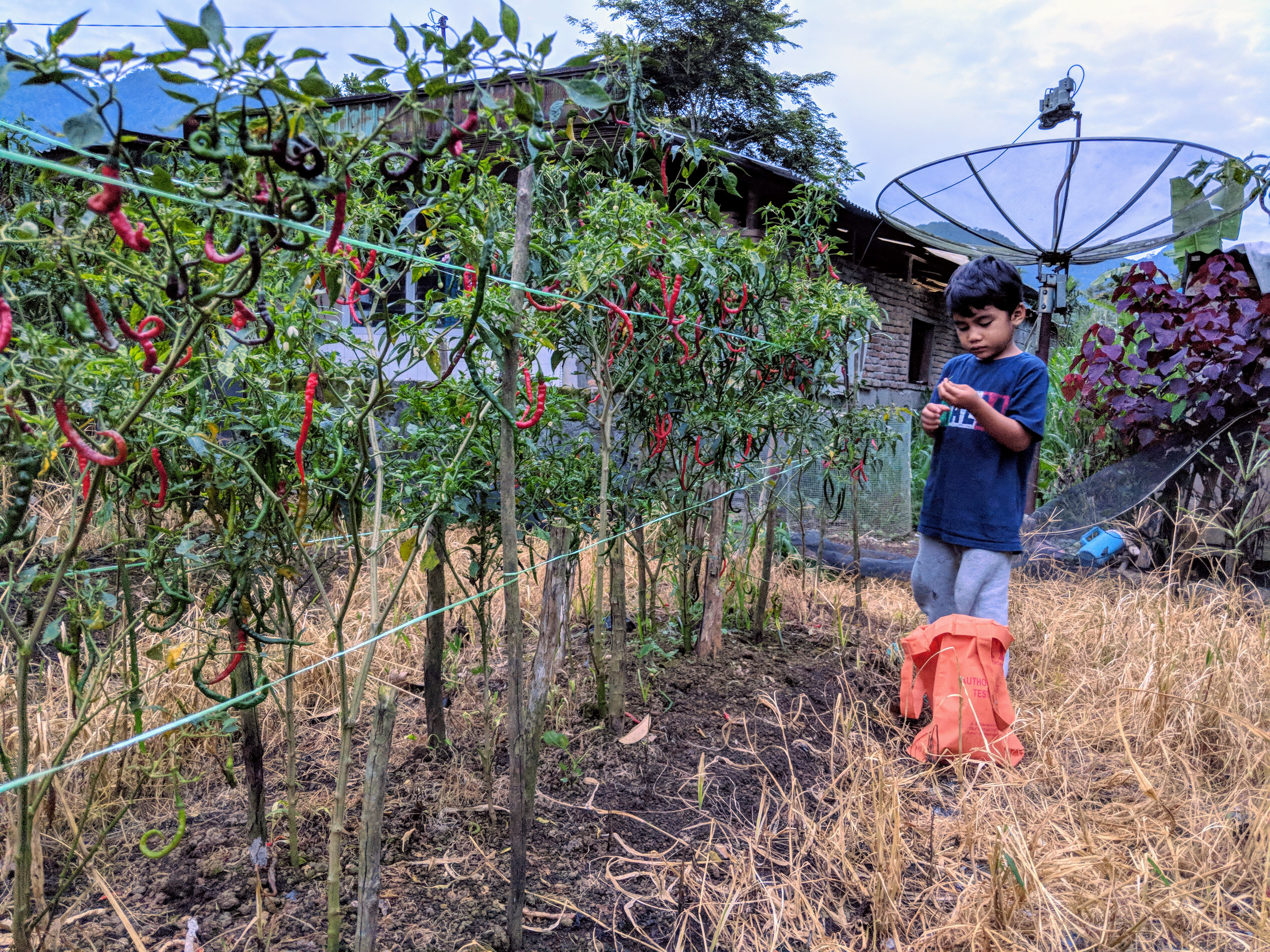
A child picks chili peppers in a pekarangan.

In urban and suburban areas, major fruit production centers, and tourist destination regions, pekarangans tend to act as an income generator. Income from the gardens is mostly from perennial crops. Good market access stimulates the cultivation of commercial crops within the gardens. Other factors that influence their economic significance are their area and the demand for a particular crop.

According to a 1991 article, the poor cultivate subsistence plants in their pekarangans with an emphasis on fruits and vegetables, while the rich tend to plant more ornamental plants and cash crops with higher economic value. An article from 2006 also concludes that the importance of commercial plants increases with owners' wealth. A study in Sriharjo, Yogyakarta Special Region, concludes that poorer pekarangan owners orient toward commercial uses while richer owners orient toward subsistence uses. Ann Stoler argued that as a rural family acquire more area of rice field, garden use becomes less intense, up until the family-owned rice field reach around 2,000 square meters (22,000 sq ft), the minimal size typically needed to feed one family. Past this point, garden use starts to increase.

=== Other uses ===
The buruan (Sundanese for "front yard"), part of a Sundanese pekarangan, is used as a children's playground and adults' gathering place. Integrated with local customs and philosophies such as rukun and tri-hita-karana, the gardens aid other social interactions such as yield-sharing, ceremonies, and religious activities. Especially in urban areas, pekarangans also function as aesthetic ornaments of a house, mainly the front yard.

== Sociology and economy ==
Pekarangans are mainly developed by women. Forms of such gardens in matriarchal tribes and societies, e.g. Minangkabau, Aceh, and communities in the 1960s Central Java, are more developed than in tribes that tend to be patriarchal, e.g. Batak. For the same reason, matriarchal culture around the gardens started to develop, such as the requirement for the permission of a landowner's wife before selling a plot of land they own—this happens in cities like Tegal. A female-led household would orient their use of the gardens toward household needs. In Madura, however, home gardens are described as the domain of men. Nevertheless, a pekarangan in general, regardless of the culture, is considered a responsibility of the entire family, including their offspring and the offspring's families. The men prepare the land prior to home garden use, plant tree crops, and sell the garden's crops, while women plant annual crops.

In a 2004 report, Javanese pekarangans are suggested to have higher net income-per-area than rice fields. The same report argued that the cost of the Javanese gardens' production is lower than that of rice fields. People who focus on the gardens' production instead of rice fields may gain better yields than their counterparts. Poor villagers, however, tend not to concentrate efforts toward the gardens; maintenance of the gardens as a sole income source would require the use of high-risk, high-reward crops, more intensive care, and income would be vulnerable to market fluctuations. Maintenance of diverse cash crops is more intense than that of rice fields and the intensity would make the villagers' gardening schedule less adaptable to rice farming activities.

In some cases, people are allowed to build houses in the pekarangans of others in exchange for doing work for the land owners. The gardens, however, tend to have a low demand for labor, offering minimal labor opportunities.

== Culture ==
=== Javanese and Sundanese ===
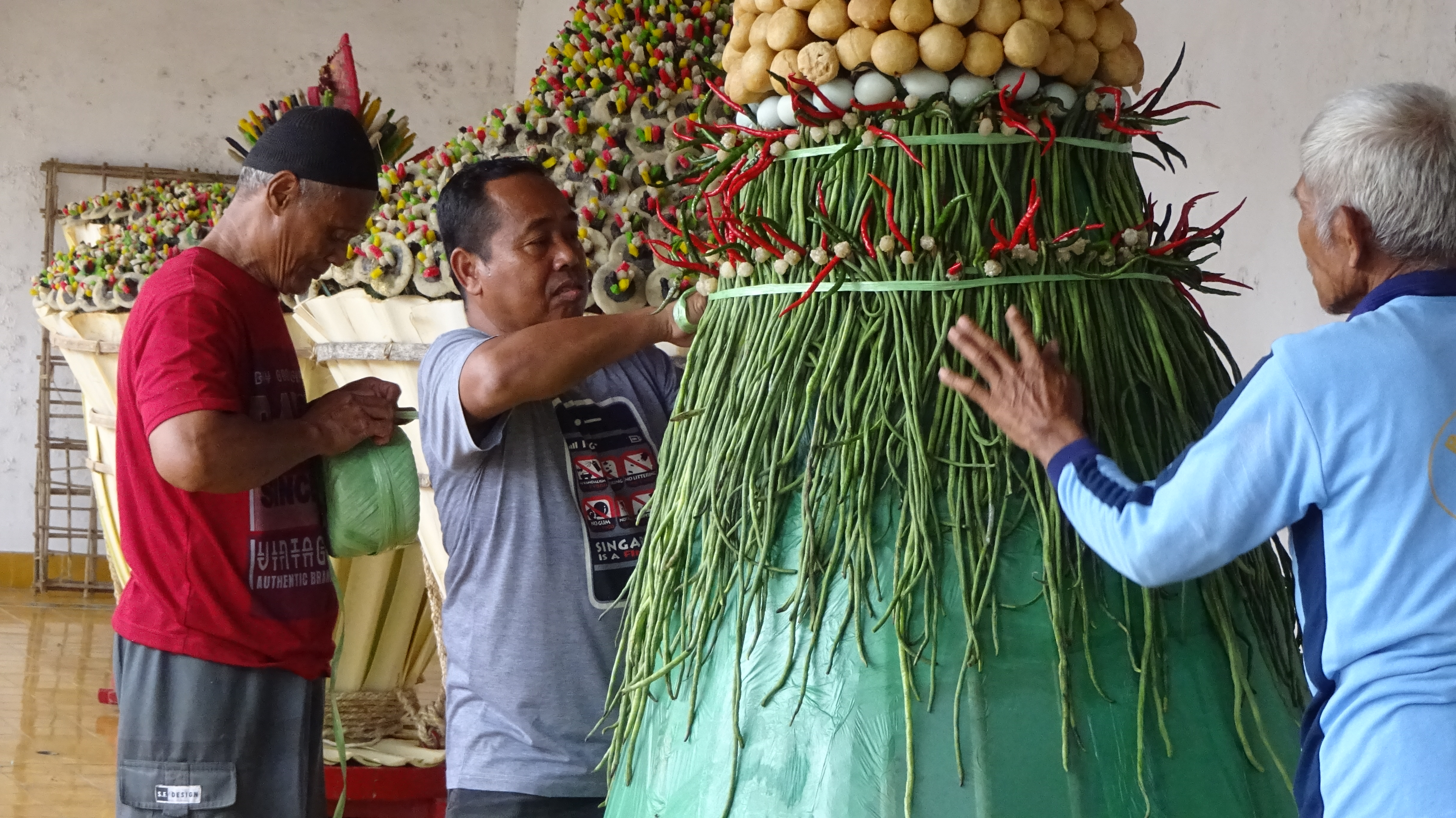
A gunungan made of food for Sekaten, a Javanese celebration for Mawlid

The philosophy of living harmoniously, referred to as rukun, is followed by the Javanese and Sundanese; offering yields from pekarangans to others is believed to be the medium of such culture. This can be done by offering its products to their neighbors, for example during events such as births, deaths, weddings, and cultural events like the Javanese new year and the Mawlid (observance of the birthday of Muhammad). Some offer their products to cure diseases or to protect owners from dangers. Their products are also given during daily life, especially in rural areas. A rural pekarangan owner usually allows others to enter it for any practical reason: taking dead wood for fuel, pulling water from a well for their own use, or even taking its crops, though permission might be restricted or denied if the owner has only a limited yield for his or her own consumption. Requests to take products from the gardens for religious or medicinal purposes are rarely or never denied, but since some people believe asking permission to take medicinal plants in a pekarangan is taboo, they may also be taken without explicit permission.

Javanese culture interpreted the gardens as pepek ing karang—"a complete design". It can also be interpreted as pepek teng karangan, which according to the anthropologist Oekan Abdoellah, is a way of thinking, indicating agricultural practices within the gardens are a consequence of thinking about the ways to use their produce and satisfy their needs from them. The words within the pepek teng karangan phrase can also be translated individually: pepek means 'complete', teng means 'on', while karangan means 'idea'. This is similar to the Sundanese breakdown of the word pekarangan: pe- is a prefix that means 'place', karang means 'idea', and the combination of these can be loosely translated as 'a place to create ideas'. Javanese culture, however, takes offense at the gardens' comparison with forests due to the low social value of forest in the culture. Wayang puppet plays depict forests as "places where wild animals and evil spirits reign" and its clearing, which is done only by men who are believed to have spiritual powers, is viewed as a respectable deed. The backyard of a Sundanese homestead is described as supados sungkur (to be unseen by others).

Associations of plants in Javanese pekarangans tend to be more complex than those in Sundanese pekarangans. In Javanese gardens, owners also tend to cultivate medicinal plants (jamu) while the Sundanese tend to grow vegetables and ornamental plants.

The Sundanese language has names for each part of a pekarangan. The front yard is called buruan, a space for a garden shed, ornamental plants, fruit trees, a children's playground, benches, and crop-drying. The side yard (pipir) is used for wood trees, crops, medicinal herbs, a fish pond, well, and a bathroom. The side yard is also a space for cloth-dying. The back yard (kebon) is used to cultivate vegetable plants, spice plants, an animal pent, and industrial plants.

=== Balinese ===
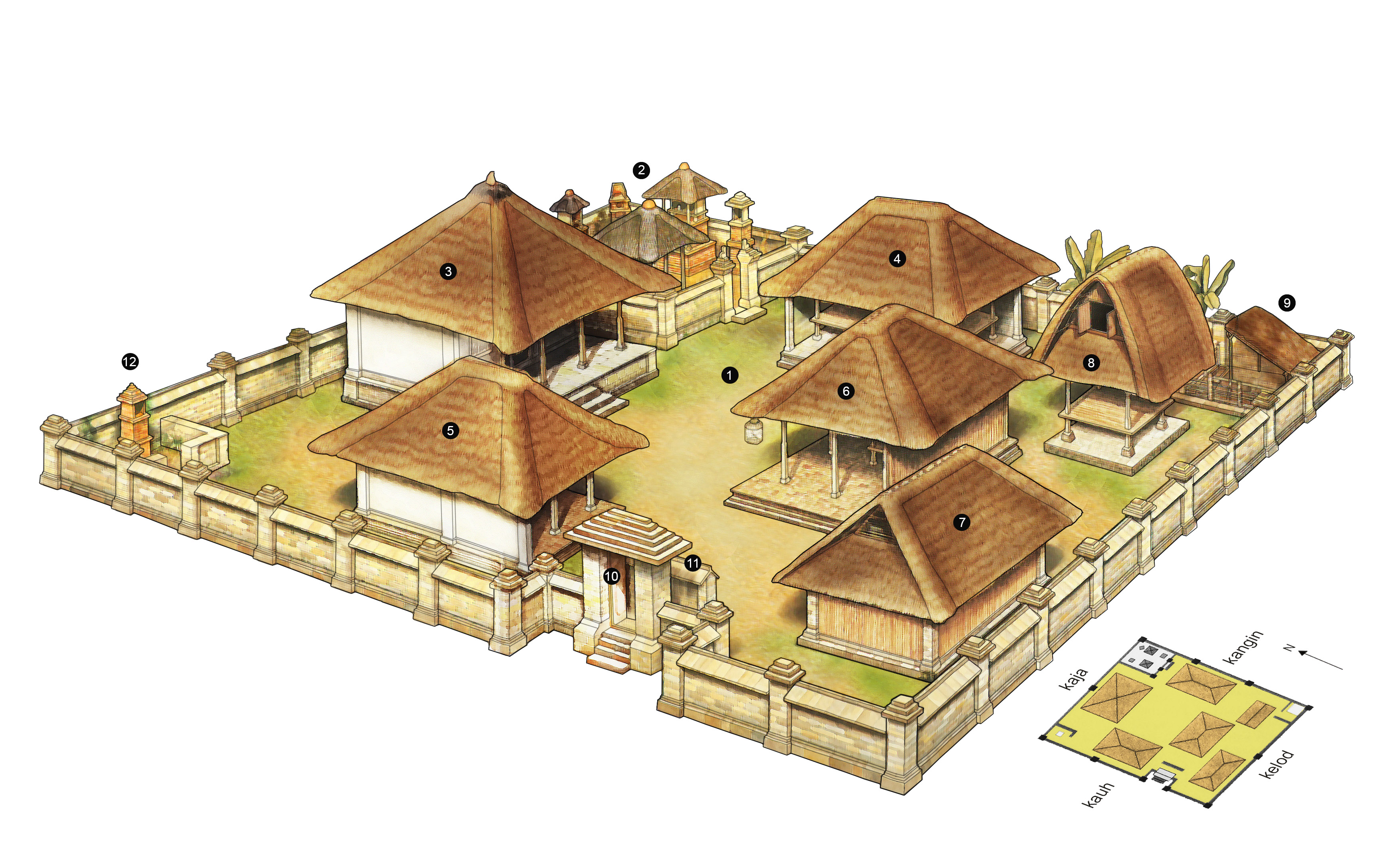
A Balinese dwelling. Included: sanggah areas on the top corner and the left corner, and natah, the outdoor area in the center. The bale daja is to the left of natah in the picture's orientation.

Balinese pekarangans are influenced by the philosophy of tri-hita-karana that divides spaces into parahyangan (top, head, pure), pawongan (middle, body, neutral), and palemahan (below, feet, impure). The parahyangan area of a Balinese pekarangan faces Mount Agung, which is regarded as a sacred place (prajan) to pray (sanggah). Plants with flowers and leaves that are regularly picked and used for Balinese Hinduism liturgical purposes are planted in the parahyangan area. The pawongan area is planted with regular flowers, fruits, and leaves. The palemahan area is planted with fruits, stems, leaves, and tubers. Balinese back yards, which are known in Tabanan and Karangasem as teba, are used as a place to cultivate crops and keep livestock for subsistence, commercial, and religious use as offerings. The Balinese further developed beliefs about what plants should and should not be planted in various parts of their pekarangans, following the teachings from the Taru Premana manuscript. As an example, nerium and bougainvillea are believed to emit positive auras while planted in the parahyangan/sanggah area of a pekarangan while negative auras are believed to appear if they are planted in front of the bale daja, a building specifically placed in the north part of a dwelling.

=== Madurese ===
Taneyan lanjhang ("long yard" in Madurese) is a system of housing and home garden in Madurese culture, shared by multiple households in a large family. Spatially, taneyan lanjhang is centered around the rectangle-shaped taneyan ("yard" in Madurese), which is used for crop drying, traditional rituals, and family ceremonies. Other elements of taneyan lanjhang include roma (house), kobung or langghar (Islamic prayer room/musalla), dapor (kitchen), kandang (livestock cage), plant fences, a warehouse, a pair of well and water basin, and outdoor bathrooms. Kobung is notable for its multi-purpose characteristics. Alongside religious uses, kobung is used to receive guests and facilitate family discussions. Kobung is also used as a bedroom substitute for bachelor members of the family. The yard (taneyan) can also act as an extension of kobung during large religious events. Given the religious uses of kobung and taneyan, taneyan lanjhang is often oriented to the direction of Mecca (qibla), which is perceived by the Madurese as "to the west". The spatial composition of taneyan lanjhang is laid out according to the bappa, babbhu, guru, rato (father, mother, teacher, leader) philosophy that shows the order of respected figures in Madurese culture.

Food crops (especially fruits) are the most common plants found in taneyan lanjhang gardens. The gardens may have a higher number of species within the legume family (Fabaceae), ginger family (Zingiberaceae), gourd family (Cucurbitaceae), and citrus family (Rutaceae), compared to other plant families. Among the gardens' most common plants are bananas, mangoes, maize, cassavas, and bamboos (specifically Bambusa glaucescens).

=== Minangkabau ===
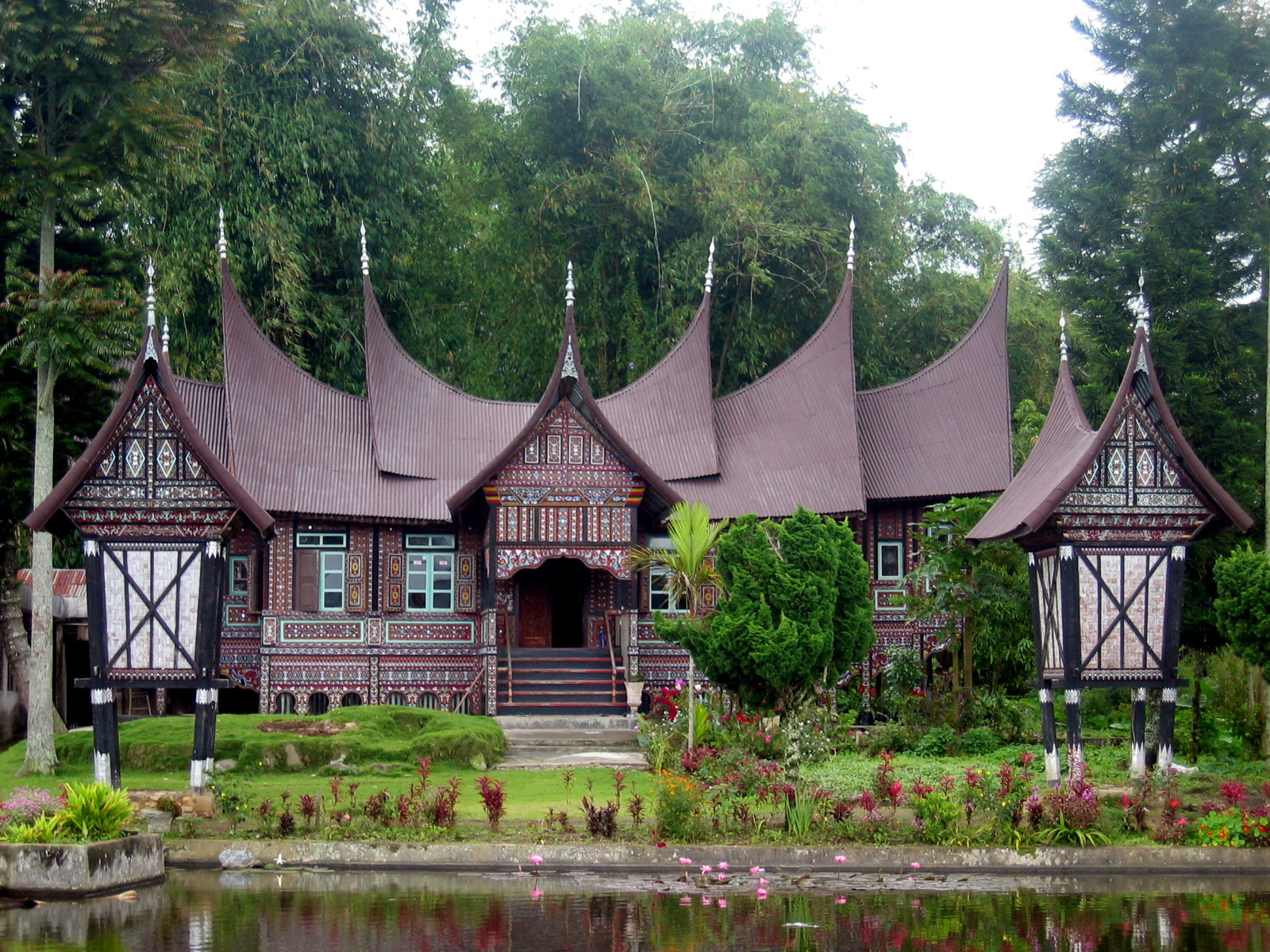
A rumah gadang with its front yard. A line of lanjuang (Cordyline fruticosa) is used for its ornamental function. A pair of rangkiang and a pond is also visible.

Pekarangans are integrated into rumah gadang, the traditional house of Minangkabau, with its own set of plant and hardscape arrangements. Portrayals of pekarangan are found within Minangkabau literature, from cultural proverbs to the 1984 book Alam Takambang Jadi Guru by AA Navis.

Plants in such gardens can be generally divided into three categories. Medicinal and aromatic plants are not cultivated in one defined area; each species occupies its own designated plot. Some plants of this kind (such as Aglaia odorata, Lawsonia inermis, Coleus scutellarioides, and Kalanchoe laciniata) are planted at the sides of rumah gadang entrance stairs. Others are planted elswhere: jasmines at the bottom of house windows, pomegranates and magnolias in the front and/or back of anjuang (rumah gadang wing rooms), and ylang-ylangs on side yards. Ornamental plants (such as Murraya paniculata, Cordyline fruticosa, and crotons) tend to be planted in all sides of the rumah gadang compound in the style of multi-layered plant fences. Spices (such as Caryota mitis and Elephantopus scaber) are planted in a parak (household smallholding).

Plants within a pekarangan rumah gadang are integral parts within Minangkabau customs and cultural wisdom. Crotons can be interpreted as a symbol of "talking manners," depicting the difference of communication between conjugal and extended family members. Aromatic plants such as jasmines are believed to "dispel satan and jinns from a house". Lanjuang (C. fruticosa) leaves are traditionally used as a sign of invitation to attend a wedding reception or a funeral by placing a lanjuang leaf on the invitee's house gate. Sugarcanes are utilized in mamanisi anak, a traditional rite to celebrate a newborn baby.

Hardscapes that are normally present in the pekarangan rumah gadang include rangkiang (rice silo), ponds, and pens. Randi Reimena of Haluanpadang.com, quoting writer Pinto Anugrah, wrote that rangkiang is "an inseparable part of rumah gadang; traditionally, a rumah gadang without rangkiang is impossible". Ponds are typically placed in any part of the pekarangan, and usually contain fishes such as nile tilapias, carps, catfishes, and mudfishes. Pens, generally made for chickens and ducks, are placed beside or behind the rumah gadang.

=== Other cultures ===
Pekarangans in Lampung culture have their own elements; alongside plants are feet-washing places used before entering into a house's veranda (gakhang hadap), a rice-storage room (walai), an outdoor kitchenette or kitchen, a firewood-storage place, and livestock barn. The front yard is called tengahbah/terambah/beruan, the side yard is kebik/kakebik, and the back yard is kudan/juyu/kebon.

Pekarangans of other ethnic groups in Indonesia have other names, including passiring and terampak benua in Buginese culture, as well as tarampak and pa'palakan in Torajan culture. Pekarangans are also integrated in local, community-level agroforestry systems, such as kaleka in Dayak households of Borneo.

== History and development ==
In the first establishment or formation of a village or new ground, the intended settlers take care to provide themselves with sufficient garden ground round their huts for stock and to supply the ordinary wants of their families. The produce of this plantation is the exclusive property of the peasant, and exempted from contribution or burden, and such is their number and extent in some regencies (as in Kedú for instance), that they constitute perhaps a tenth part of the area of the whole district. The spot surrounding his simple habitation, the cottager considers his peculiar patrimony and cultivates with peculiar care. He labours to plant and rear in it those vegetables that may be most useful to his family and those shrubs and trees which may at once yield him their fruit and their shade; nor does he waste his efforts on a thankless soil. The cottages, or the assemblage of huts, that compose the village, become thus completely screened from the rays of a scorching sun, and are so buried amid the foliage of a luxuriant vegetation, that at a small distance no appearance of a human dwelling can be discovered, and the residence of a numerous society appears only a verdant grove or a clump of evergreens. Nothing can exceed the beauty or the interest, which such detached mass of verdure, scattered over the face of the country, and indicating each the abode of a collection of happy peasantry, add to scenery otherwise rich, whether viewed on the sides of the mountains, in the narrow vales, or in the extensive plains. — Stamford Raffles, The History of Java, 1817.
Parts of the quote were also quoted by Ann Stoler in Garden Use and Household Economy in Rural Java, 1978

Distribution of pekarangan areas in Java
Province	<100m^{2}	100m^{2}-200m^{2}	200m^{2}-300m^{2}	>300m^{2}
West Java-Banten	52.29%	25.00%	8.77%	8.95%
Central Java	27.50%	27.57%	13.20%	31.73%
East Java	34.52%	25.83%	13.33%	31.73%
Special Region of Yogyakarta	33.51%	17.48%	14.61%	34.40%
Source: Arifin, Kaswanto & Nakagoshi 2014

By 1902, pekarangans occupied 378,000 hectares (1,460 sq mi) of land in Java, and the area increased to 1,417,000 hectares (5,470 sq mi) in 1937 and 1,612,568 hectares (6,226.16 sq mi) in 1986. In 2000, they occupied about 1,736,000 hectares (6,700 sq mi). Indonesia as a whole had 5,132,000 hectares (19,810 sq mi) of such gardens in 2000. The number increased at about 10,300,000 hectares (40,000 sq mi) in 2010. In 2021, the number reached an estimate of 14,300,000 hectares (55,000 sq mi).

Soemarwoto and Conway stated that the first-known record of them is a Javanese charter from 860. Central Java is considered the pekarangans' center of origin, according to Oekan Abdoellah et al.; the gardens later spread to East Java in the twelfth century. During the Dutch colonial era, pekarangans were referred to as erfcultuur. In the eighteenth century, Javanese pekarangans had already so influenced West Java that they had partly replaced talun (a local form of mixed gardens) there. Since pekarangans contain many species, which mature at different times throughout the year, it has been difficult for governments throughout Javanese history to tax them systematically. In 1990, this difficulty caused the Indonesian government to forbid the reduction of rice fields in favor of pekarangans. Such difficulty might have helped the gardens to become more complex over time. Despite that, past governments still tried to tax the gardens.

=== Effects of economic and population growth in the late 20th century ===
Since the 1970s, Indonesia had observed economic growth rooted in the Indonesian government's five-year development plans (Repelita), which were launched in 1969. The economic growth helped increase the numbers of middle-class and upper-class families, resulting in better life and higher demand for quality products, including fruits and vegetables. Pekarangans in urban, suburban, and main fruit production areas adapted its efforts to increase their products' quality but this resulted in a reduction of biological diversity in the gardens, leading to an increased vulnerability to pests and plant diseases. Some disease outbreaks in commercial pekarangans occurred in the 1980s and the 1990s, such as the citrus greening disease that damaged many mandarin orange trees and the spread of the pathogenic fungi Phyllosticta, which affected almost 20% of clove trees in West Java. This vulnerability also affected their owners' economic and social conditions; owners became more susceptible to debt, the sharing culture in traditional commercial pekarangans vanished, and the poor enjoyed fewer rights from them.

=== Government programs ===
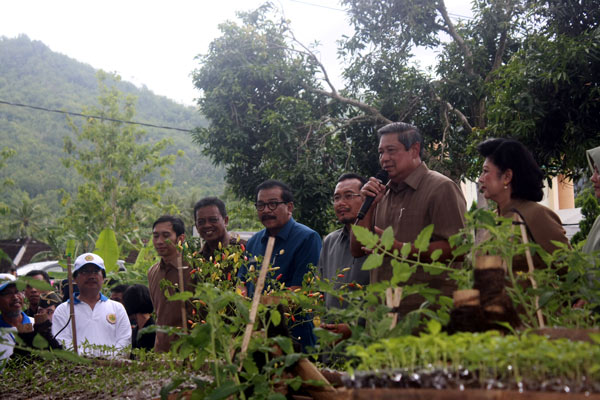
Susilo Bambang Yudhoyono, the sixth president of Indonesia, speaking in front of Kayen Village Seed Garden, a part of KRPL prototypes in Pacitan

The Indonesian government launched a campaign in October 1951, namely Karang Kitri, which aimed to persuade communities to plant trees in their home gardens and other types of land. There was no incentive given in the campaign. The campaign ended in 1960. Use of pekarangans was included in a program by the Indonesian government in 1991 under a program called Diversifikasi Pangan dan Gizi ("Food and Nutrition Diversification").

Since the early 2010s, the government, through the Ministry of Agriculture, runs a pekarangan development initiative named Percepatan Penganekaragaman Konsumsi Pangan (P2KP, "Acceleration on Food Diversification") that is focused in urban and semi-urban areas. The program applies its agenda to a concept named Kawasan Rumah Pangan Lestari (KRPL; "Sustainable Food Houses Region"). P2KP was begun under the Indonesian Presidential Regulation No. 22 Year 2009. There is also an urban women-focused program named Gerakan Perempuan untuk Optimalisasi Pekarangan (GPOP; "Women's Movement for Pekarangan Optimization").

In addition to the national programs, some regions of Indonesia have implemented their own pekarangan use programs. The government of East Java launched a program called Rumah Hijau ("Green House") in 2010. The provincial government later collaborated with the Ministry of Agriculture to improve upon the Rumah Hijau program based on KRPL prototypes in Pacitan, making a new program named Rumah Hijau Plus-Plus.

== Works cited ==
- Abdoellah, Oekan Soekotjo; Parikesit; Gunawan, Budhi; Hadikusumah, Herri (2001). "Home gardens in the Upper Citarum Watershed, West Java: a challenge for in situ conservation of plant genetic resources" (doc). In Watson, Jessica W.; Eyzaguirre, Pablo A. (eds.). Home Gardens and in Situ Conservation of Plant Genetic Resources in Farming Systems. Witzenhausen: International Plant Genetic Resources Institute. pp. 140–147.
- Aditiameri; Susilastuti, Darwati; Darmansyah, Erwin (2021). "Analisis Pemanfaatan Pekarangan Berdasarkan Strata Luas di Kelurahan Kalisari Jakarta Timur". Agrisia: Jurnal Ilmu-Ilmu Pertanian. 14 (1). ISSN 2621-3443.
- Arifin, Hadi Susilo (2013). Orasi Ilmiah Guru Besar: Pekarangan Kampung untuk Konservasi Agro-Biodiversitas dalam Mendukung Penganekargaman dan Ketahanan Pangan di Indonesia (in Indonesian). Bogor: IPB Press.
- Arifin, Hadi Susilo; Kaswanto, Regan Leonardus; Nakagoshi, Nobukazu (2014). "Low Carbon Society Through Pekarangan, Traditional Agroforestry Practices in Java, Indonesia". In Nakagoshi, Nobukazu; Mabuhay, Jhonamie A. (eds.). Designing Low Carbon Societies in Landscapes. Ecological Research Monographs. Tokyo: Springer Japan. pp. 129–143. doi:10.1007/978-4-431-54819-5_8. ISBN 978-4-431-54818-8. ISSN 2191-0707.
- Arifin, Hadi Susilo; Sakamoto, Keiji; Chiba, Kyozo (1996). "Effects of the Fragmentation and the Change of the Social and Economical Aspects on the Vegetation Structure in the Rural Home Gardens of West Java, Indonesia". Journal of the Japanese Institute of Landscape Architecture. 60 (5): 489–494. doi:10.5632/jila.60.489. ISSN 1348-4559.
- Arifin, Hadi Susilo; Sakamoto, Keiji; Chiba, Kyozo (1998). "Effects of Urbanization on the Vegetation Structure of Home Gardens in West Java, Indonesia". Japanese Journal of Tropical Agriculture. 42 (2): 94–102. doi:10.11248/jsta1957.42.94. ISSN 2185-0259.
- Ashari; Saptana; Purwantini, Tri Bastuti (2016). "Potensi dan Prospek Pemanfaatan Lahan Pekarangan untuk Mendukung Ketahanan Pangan". Forum Penelitian Agro Ekonomi (in Indonesian). 30 (1): 13. doi:10.21082/fae.v30n1.2012.13-30 (inactive 12 July 2025). ISSN 2580-2674.
- Christanty, Linda; Abdoellah, Oekan Soekotjo; Marten, Gerald G.; Iskandar, Johan (1986). "Traditional Agroforestry in West Java: The Pekarangan (Homegarden) and Kebun-Talun (Annual-Perennial Rotation) Cropping Systems" (PDF). In Marten, Gerry G. (ed.). Traditional Agriculture in Southeast Asia: a Human Ecology Perspective. Boulder, CO: Westview Press. pp. 132–158. ISBN 0-8133-7026-4.
- [Depdikbud] Indonesian Department of Education and Culture (1993). Sirat, Muhidin; Miraya Zulaiha B; Budiono; Budhiono SK (eds.). Peralatan Produksi Tradisional dan Perkembangannya Daerah Lampung (in Indonesian). Jakarta: Indonesian Department of Education and Culture.
- Devi, Silvia (2017). "Pekarangan Rumah Gadang Minangkabau". Bunga rampai Sumatera Barat, Bengkulu, dan Sumatera Selatan: masyarakat dan budaya (in Indonesian). Suarman Suarman. Padang: Balai Pelestarian Nilai Budaya Sumatera Barat. pp. 130–168. ISBN 978-602-6554-10-9.
- Dove, Michael R. (1990). "Socio-Political Aspects of Home Gardens in Java". Journal of Southeast Asian Studies. 21 (1): 155–163. doi:10.1017/s0022463400002009. ISSN 0022-4634. S2CID 131567459.
- Febrianto, Redi Sigit; Wulandari, Lisa Dwi; Santosa, Herry (2017). "Domain Ruang Perempuan Pada Hunian Masyarakat Peladang Desa Juruan Laok Madura Timur". Tesa Arsitektur (in Indonesian). 15 (1): 54–63. doi:10.24167/tesa.v15i1.1014. ISSN 2460-6367. S2CID 217305061.
- Gliessman, Stephen R. (1990). "Integrating Trees into Agriculture: The Home Garden Agroecosystem as an Example of Agroforestry in the Tropics". In Gliessman, Stephen R. (ed.). Agroecology. Ecological Studies. Vol. 78. New York: Springer New York. pp. 160–168. doi:10.1007/978-1-4612-3252-0_11. ISBN 978-1-4612-7934-1. ISSN 0070-8356.
- "Ini Aura yang Muncul dari Tanaman Pekarangan Berdasarkan Penempatannya". Bali Express (in Indonesian). 2018.
- Kaswanto, Regan Leonardus; Nakagoshi, Nobukazu (2014). "Landscape Ecology-Based Approach for Assessing Pekarangan Condition to Preserve Protected Area in West Java". In Nakagoshi, Nobukazu; Mabuhay, Jhonamie A. (eds.). Designing Low Carbon Societies in Landscapes. Ecological Research Monographs. Tokyo: Springer Japan. pp. 289–311. doi:10.1007/978-4-431-54819-5_17. ISBN 978-4-431-54818-8. ISSN 2191-0707.
- Kehlenbeck, Katja; Arifin, Hadi Susilo; Maass, Brigitte L. (2007). "Plant diversity in homegardens in a socio-economic and agro-ecological context". In Tscharntke, Teja; Leuschner, Christoph; Zeller, Manfred; Guhardja, Edi; Bidin, Arifuddin (eds.). Stability of Tropical Rainforest Margins. Environmental Science and Engineering. Berlin, Heidelberg: Springer Berlin Heidelberg. pp. 295–317. doi:10.1007/978-3-540-30290-2_15. ISBN 978-3-540-30289-6.
- Kehlenbeck, Katja; Maass, Brigitte L. (2006). "Are tropical homegardens sustainable? Some evidence from Central Sulawesi, Indonesia". In Kumar, B. Mohan; Nair, P. K. Ramachandran (eds.). Tropical Homegardens. Advances in Agroforestry. Vol. 3. Dordrecht: Springer Netherlands. pp. 339–354. doi:10.1007/978-1-4020-4948-4_19. ISBN 978-1-4020-4947-7. ISSN 1875-1199.
- Maningtyas, Rosyidamayanti Twinsari; Gunawan, Andi (2017). "Taneyan Lanjhang, Study of Home Garden Design Based Local Culture of Madura". IOP Conference Series: Earth and Environmental Science. 91 (12022) 012022. Bibcode:2017E&ES...91a2022M. doi:10.1088/1755-1315/91/1/012022. S2CID 115662122.
- Mitchell, Robert; Hanstad, Tim (2004). Small Homegarden Plots and Sustainable Livelihoods for the Poor (PDF) (Report). FAO.
- Nawir, Ani Adiwinata; Murniati; Rumboko, Lukas (2007). Forest rehabilitation in Indonesia: Where to after more than three decades? (PDF). Jakarta, Indonesia: Center for International Forestry Research. ISBN 978-979-1412-05-6. OCLC 226211357.
- "pekarangan". The Online Great Dictionary of the Indonesian Language (KBBI) (in Indonesian). Language and Book Development Agency, Indonesian Ministry of Education and Culture (Indonesia).
- Prabowo, Walesa Edho; Darras, Kevin; Clough, Yann; Toledo-Hernandez, Manuel; Arlettaz, Raphael; Mulyani, Yeni A.; Tscharntke, Teja (2016). Bersier, Louis-Felix (ed.). "Bird Responses to Lowland Rainforest Conversion in Sumatran Smallholder Landscapes, Indonesia". PLOS ONE. 11 (5) e0154876. Public Library of Science (PLoS). Bibcode:2016PLoSO..1154876P. doi:10.1371/journal.pone.0154876. ISSN 1932-6203. PMC 4880215. PMID 27224063.
- Pranoto, Hadi; Pujowati, Penny; Ramayana, Syamad; Turnip, Guido Narodo (2024). "Identification of Homegarden Patterns on Several Etnic in Berau Regency" (PDF). Jurnal Agroekoteknologi Tropika Lembab. 6 (2): 61–67.
- Pratiwi, Rian Adetiya; Gunawan, Andi (2017). "Study Of Lampungnese Traditional Home Garden Design". IOP Conference Series: Earth and Environmental Science. 91 (12024) 012024. Bibcode:2017E&ES...91a2024P. doi:10.1088/1755-1315/91/1/012024. S2CID 191568916.
- Raffles, Thomas Stamford (1817). The History of Java: In Two Volumes. London: Black, Parbury, and Allen.
- Rahu, Anggie Abban; Hidayat, Kliwon; Ariyadi, Mahrus; Hakim, Luchman (2013). "Ethnoecology of Kaleka: Dayak's Agroforestry in Kapuas, Central Kalimantan Indonesia" (PDF). Research Journal of Agriculture and Forestry Sciences. 1 (8): 5–12.
- Reimena, Randi (2021). "Mengenal Jenis-jenis Rangkiang: dari Si Tinjau Lauik sampai Rangkiang Kaciak - Haluan Padang". Mengenal Jenis-jenis Rangkiang: dari Si Tinjau Lauik sampai Rangkiang Kaciak - Haluan Padang (in Indonesian).
- Roshetko, James M.; Delaney, Matt; Hairiah, Kurniatun; Purnomosidhi, Pratiknyo (2002). "Carbon stocks in Indonesian homegarden systems: Can smallholder systems be targeted for increased carbon storage? – American Journal of Alternative Agriculture". American Journal of Alternative Agriculture. 17 (3): 138–148. doi:10.1079/AJAA200116. ISSN 1478-5498.
- Rostiyati, Ani (2013). "Tipologi Rumah Tradisional Kampung Wana di Lampung Timur". Patanjala (in Indonesian). 5 (3): 459–474. doi:10.30959/patanjala.v5i3.101 (inactive 12 July 2025). ISSN 2598-1242.
- Saraswati, A.A. Oka (2009). "Transformasi Arsitektur Bale Daja". DIMENSI (Journal of Architecture and Built Environment) (in Indonesian). 36 (1): 35–42. ISSN 2338-7858.
- Saptana; Sunarsih; Friyatno, Supena (2013). "Prospek Model-Kawasan Rumah Pangan Lestari (M-KRPL) Dan Replikasi Pengembangan KRPL". Forum Penelitian Agro Ekonomi (in Indonesian). 31 (1): 67. doi:10.21082/fae.v31n1.2013.67-87 (inactive 12 July 2025). ISSN 2580-2674.
- Setiani, Setiani; Setiawan, Eko; Huang, Wen-Chi (2022). "Taneyan Lanjang Shared Home Gardens and Sustainable Rural Livelihoods of Ethnic Madurese in Madura Island, Indonesia". Sustainability. 14 (10): 5960. Bibcode:2022Sust...14.5960S. doi:10.3390/su14105960. ISSN 2071-1050.
- Soemarwoto, Otto; Soemarwato, Idjah; Karyono; Soekartadiredja, E. Momo; Ramlan, Aseng (1985). "The Javanese Home-Garden as an Integrated Agro-Ecosystem". Food and Nutrition Bulletin. 7 (3): 1–4. doi:10.1177/156482658500700313. ISSN 1564-8265. S2CID 80666398.
- Soemarwoto, Otto; Conway, Gordon R. (1992). "The Javanese homegarden". Journal of Farming Systems Research-Extension. 2 (3): 95–118.
- Stoler, Ann (1978). "Garden Use and Household Economy in Rural Java". Bulletin of Indonesian Economic Studies. 14 (2). Informa UK Limited: 85–101. doi:10.1080/00074917812331333331. ISSN 0007-4918.
- Tatefuji, Tomoki; Yanagihara, Miyako; Fukushima, Shinobu; Hashimoto, Ken (2014-05-01). "Safety assessment of melinjo (Gnetum gnemon L.) seed extract: Acute and subchronic toxicity studies". Food and Chemical Toxicology. 67: 230–235. doi:10.1016/j.fct.2014.02.030. ISSN 0278-6915.
- Torquebiau, Emmanuel (1992). "Are tropical agroforestry home gardens sustainable?". Agriculture, Ecosystems & Environment. 41 (2): 189–207. Bibcode:1992AgEE...41..189T. doi:10.1016/0167-8809(92)90109-o. ISSN 0167-8809.
- Widyastuti, Rahayu (2004). "Abundance, Biomass and Diversity of Soil Fauna at Different Ecosystems in Jakenan, Pati, Central Java". Jurnal Ilmu Tanah Dan Lingkungan [Journal of Soil Science and Environment]. 6 (1): 1–6. doi:10.29244/jitl.6.1.1-6. ISSN 2549-2853.
- Wiersum, K.F. (2006). "Diversity and change in homegarden cultivation in Indonesia". In Kumar, B. Mohan; Nair, P. K. Ramachandran (eds.). Tropical Homegardens. Advances in Agroforestry. Vol. 3. Dordrecht: Springer Netherlands. pp. 13–24. doi:10.1007/978-1-4020-4948-4_2. ISBN 978-1-4020-4947-7. ISSN 1875-1199.
- Yamamoto, Yoshinori; Kubota, Naohiro; Ogo, Tatsuo; Priyono (1991). "Changes in the Structure of Homegardens under Different Climatic Conditions in Java Island". Japanese Journal of Tropical Agriculture. 35 (2): 104–117. doi:10.11248/jsta1957.35.104. ISSN 2185-0259.
