= House & Garden =

House & Garden may refer to

- House & Garden (magazine), a lifestyle magazine
- House & Garden (plays), two plays by Alan Ayckbourn which form a diptych, published in 2000 as House & Garden
- "House & Garden" (Batman: The Animated Series), a 1994 episode of Batman: The Animated Series
- House and Garden, in Hebrew Bayit VeGan, a neighborhood in Jerusalem
- House and Garden, in Hebrew Bayit VeGan was the initial name of the city of Bat Yam, Israel

== See also ==
- Home & Garden (disambiguation)
- , a number of historical estates include "House and Garden" in their name
