= BHG =

BHG may refer to:

- Beijing Hualian Group, a Chinese retailer in Beijing
- Bergen Handelsgymnasium, an upper secondary school in Bergen, Norway
- Bibliotheca Hagiographica Graeca, a catalogue of Greek hagiographic materials
- Big Huge Games, a video game developer in Timonium, Maryland
- Black-headed gull, a small gull
- Bloodhound Gang, an American rock band
- Blue Harbour Group, an American investment firm
- Black Hills Gold, former basketball club in Rapid city, South Dakota
- Black Hills gold jewelry, jewelry produced in the black hills region of South Dakota

== See also ==
- Better Homes and Gardens (disambiguation)
