= Better Homes and Gardens Best New Product Awards =

Better Homes and Gardens Best New Product Awards is the American division of the Best New Product Awards International Program.

== About ==
Better Homes and Gardens Best New Product Awards is an annual awards program focusing on everyday consumer packaged goods products (food, health & beauty and household care). Winners are selected based on voting by real consumers who participate in a yearly independent survey conducted by BrandSpark International in conjunction with IMI International. Consumers vote on winning products based on the products' appeal and repurchase intent.

== Survey ==
The survey is one of the largest consumer surveys about new product development and innovation in the United States. For the 2010 program, over 77,500 American consumers, from across the country, participated in the survey.

== Reach ==
Winners of the Best New Product Awards are featured each year in the Better Homes and Gardens May issue, on BHG.com and on Better TV, reaching millions of consumers across the US.
