= Otto Soemarwoto =

Indonesian scientist (1926–2008)

Otto Soemarwoto

Prof. Otto Soemarwoto (19 February 1926 – 1 April 2008) was an Indonesian botanist and professor of plant physiology at Padjadjaran University and was director of the National Biology Institute from 1964 to 1972; he also served as director of the Institute of Ecology from 1972 until 1991. His work in the latter role has been cited as a primary influence on the resettlement strategy during Indonesia's Saguling Dam project.

== Early life and education ==
Born in Purwokerto, as a child Soemarwoto was an avid reader, liked traveling out of town and was fond of plants. He studied at a nautical training high school in Cilacap and, after completing his training at the high school, he worked as a deck officer on a wooden boat that travelled the Jakarta-Lampung route. Soemarwoto joined the student militia during the Indonesian struggle for independence, and upon its proclamation continued his studies at the School of Agriculture at Gadjah Mada University (UGM), Yogyakarta, of which he graduated in 1949.

== Academic career ==
He taught at UGM before being sent to study plant physiology at the University of California, Berkeley, where he stayed until 1959. An avid environmentalist, the professor was appointed so in 1960. In 1964 he was named director of the Bogor Botanical Garden at Padjajaran University.

== Awards and recognition ==
Soemarwoto was awarded an honorary doctorate from Wageningen University in the Netherlands, the Order of the Golden Ark from the Netherlands'Prince Bernhard, and the Global 500 award from the United Nations Environment Programme.

In 1981, Soemarwoto received a Fulbright teaching grant that allowed him to spend a year at the Department of Anthropology at the University of California, Berkeley. During this time, he taught courses emphasizing environmental issues and their impact on local communities. He also continued research on the relocation of people from the Saguling dam site in West Java, studying the long-term effects on both human livelihoods and the surrounding natural environment.

== Personal life ==
He died in Bandung on 1 April 2008, aged 82.

== Bibliography ==
- Pembangunan Berkelanjutan: antara Konsep dan Realitas (Sustainable Development: between Concept and Reality, 2006)
