= Phoenix Home & Garden =

- Circulation: 85,352 (September 2009)
- Founded: Joel and Lila Harnett
- First issue: November 1980
- Company: Cities West Publishing
- Country: US
- Based in: Phoenix, Arizona
- Language: English
- Website: www.phgmag.com
- ISSN: 0270-9341

Phoenix Home & Garden, also styled as Phoenix Home + Garden, is a monthly magazine based in Phoenix, Arizona, USA. It is written for people who desire information on Southwest USA living and regional advice for growing desert plants.

== Overview ==
Phoenix Home & Garden was first published in November 1980. The founders were Joel and Lila Harnett.

The magazine has received various national awards, including the Maggie awards from the Western Publications Association.

The magazine reported its paid circulation as 85,352 copies in September 2009 with monthly newsstand sales topping 11,000.
